= 1922 in aviation =

This is a list of aviation-related events from 1922:

== Events ==
- The Persian Army forms an air department.
- The Argentine Navy opens a naval aviation school.
- Brazil studies the possibility of converting two merchant ships into aircraft carriers. Although nothing comes of the idea, it is the first time a Latin American country considers the acquisition of an aircraft carrier.
- The first commercial night flight between London and Paris takes place.
- The Imperial Japanese Navy attaches rigid airships to the Combined Fleet, and they begin to participate in the fleet's exercises.
- During an exercise in Tokyo Bay, Imperial Japanese Navy aircraft drop torpedoes for the first time.
- The Spanish Navy commissions Dédalo, its only aviation ship until after the end of World War II and the only ship in history equipped to operate airships, balloons, and seaplanes. She and USS Patoka (AO-9) are the only ships ever fitted with an airship mooring mast.
- No. 60 Squadron RAF sees active service against rebel tribesmen in the Northwest Frontier Province of India.
- Henry Berliner founds the Berliner Aircraft Company in Alexandria, Pennsylvania.
- The Lewis & Vought Corporation is renamed the Chance Vought Corporation.
- Hermann Oberth's submits his dissertation, which is rejected as "too fantastic". It will be published in 1923 as The Rocket to Planetary Spaces and will become a major work in spaceflight history.
- The Società Aeronautica Italiana is founded by Angelo Ambrosini at Passignano sul Trasimeno, Italy.
- A factory fire forces English aircraft and motorcycle manufacturer Martinsyde into liquidation with surplus Buzzard airframes in stock.
- Adolphe Bernard's Société Industrielle des Métaux et du Bois (SIMB; Industrial Company for Metals and Wood) establishes an aeronautical branch with Jean Hubert as its director and begins the design and manufacture of aircraft. As the Etablissements Adolphe Bernard (Adolphe Bernard Establishments), the company previously had produced aircraft from April 1917 until a November 1920 reorganization. After a 1926 bankruptcy, Bernard again will reorganize the company in 1927 as the Société des Avions Bernard (Bernard Aircraft Company).

=== January ===
- January 14 – The Handley Page O/10 G-EATN, operated by Handley Page Transport on a scheduled passenger flight from Croydon Airport in London, England, to Paris–Le Bourget Airport outside Paris, France, crashes while on approach to Paris–Le Bourget, killing all five people on board.

=== February ===
- February 6 – The Washington Naval Conference concludes in Washington, D.C., with an agreement on the Five-Power Treaty (often referred to as the Washington Naval Treaty), which places limits on naval forces, including aircraft carriers. It limits the aircraft carrier forces of the United Kingdom and United States to 135,000 displacement tons each, of Japan to 81,000 tons, and of France and Italy to 60,000 tons each. No aircraft carrier may mount guns of greater than 8 inches (200 mm) in bore or exceed 27,000 displacement tons except for the planned United States Navy carriers USS Lexington (CV-2) and USS Saratoga (CV-3), which the treaty permits to displace 33,000 tons each. The treaty will remain in force until December 31, 1936.

=== March ===
- March 13 – Portuguese pilots Captain Gago Coutinho and Captain Sacadura Cabral leave Lisbon to attempt the first aerial crossing of the South Atlantic. They arrive in Brazil on June 16, in the third Fairey III they use for the trip.
- March 20 – The United States Navy commissions its first aircraft carrier, USS Langley (CV-1), a converted collier.
- March 22 – A chartered seaplane from Miami to Bimini developed engine problems and ditched into the sea eight and a half miles from its destination. All five passengers as well as the pilot (and owner) of the seaplane survived the crash but the passengers subsequently drowned. Only the pilot survived, picked up by a passing tanker after 56 hours in the water.

=== April ===
- April 4 – The Colombian Ministry of War opens a flying school, the Escuela de Aviación ("School of Aviation"), at Flandes.
- April 7 – 1922 Picardie mid-air collision: A Daimler Airway de Havilland DH.18 collides with a Compagnie des Grands Express Aériens Farman Goliath over France. All seven people aboard the two aircraft are killed in the first mid-air collision of two airliners.
- April 13 – While preparing for the first attempt in history to fly around the world, Royal Australian Air Force Captain Ross Smith and Lieutenant James Bennett die in the crash at Byfleet, Surrey, England, of a Vickers Viking amphibian aircraft they are testing for the proposed circumnavigation.
- April 16 – Secretly taking advantage of the Treaty of Rapallo with Bolshevik Russia and in violation of the Treaty of Versailles, Germany sets up a flying school for German pilots at Lipetsk in Russia. By 1933, 450 German military pilots will have trained there.

=== May ===
- The Italian Corpo Aeronautico Militare ("Military Aviation Corps") holds experimental maneuvers in Friuli, Italy, to test the ability of military aircraft to coordinate troop movements on the ground by informing ground commanders of the movements of friendly and enemy ground forces. The experiment is less successful than hoped because of communication difficulties.
- The admirals′ committee of the Regia Marina (Italian Royal Navy) meets to discuss aviation generally and the use of airplanes in naval operations. Among the opinions expressed are that strikes by torpedo planes against ships at sea would be hampered by their need for support by reconnaissance and attack aircraft and the small amount of explosive in aerial torpedoes and would be no more dangerous that torpedo boat attacks and unlikely to achieve any success; that the Italian people would not want their defense to rely in a force "enclosed in such a fragile wrapping as today′s aircraft;" and that the airplane would take a long time to develop into a practical naval weapon and at present was "contrary to the ethical and aesthetic elements the Regia Marina was accustomed to demand in [its] preparation for war." Despite some positive comments on the freedom of movement of aircraft to conduct deep strikes against an enemy and the possibility that airplanes could provide a defense of coastlines and land borders out to a distance of 200 miles (320 km), the committee concludes that no warship had yet been sunk by aircraft and that "notwithstanding the many writings and opinions tending to exalt the value of aerial forces, they cannot yet be considered so important as to substitute, even in part, for the actions of naval and military forces in war."
- May 1 – Deruluft (Deutsche-Russische Luftverkehrs, "German-Russian Airlines") commences operations.
- May 7 – As part of the ceremonies during the inaugural weekend of Stadium Jalapeño at Xalapa, Veracruz, Mexico, the American pilot Frank Hawks lands his Standard J-1 biplane on the field within the stadium.
- May 15 – Instone Air Line commences flights between Croydon Airport (London), Brussels and Cologne Butzweilerhof Airport.
- May 24 – The first attempt to fly around the world begins as British Army Major Wilfred T. Blake, Royal Air Force Captain Norman Macmillan, and British Army Lieutenant Colonel L. E. Broome depart Croydon, England, in the modified Airco DH.9 G-EBDE. They plan to fly to Calcutta, India, in the DH.9, then on to Vancouver, British Columbia, Canada, in a Fairey IIIC floatplane, then to Montreal, Quebec, Canada, in another DH.9, and finally from Montreal to Great Britain, covering 23,690 miles (38,130 km) and completing the journey on September 7, 1922.
- May 31 – For the first time in history, skywriting is used for advertising purposes when Royal Air Force Captain Cyril Turner writes "Daily Mail" over the Derby at Epsom Downs Racecourse near Epsom, Surrey, England.

=== June ===
- Flying an Avro Baby, a Russian pilot makes the first flight between London and Moscow.
- The first aircraft of the Irish Air Corps, a Martinsyde Buzzard Type A, arrives in Ireland at Baldonnel Aerodrome.
- June 16 – Henry Berliner demonstrates a primitive helicopter to the United States Army.
- June 17 – Jumping from a Finnish Air Force Grigorovich M-16, Eero Erho makes Finland′s first parachute jump.
- June 24 – Construction of the United States Navy rigid airship USS Shenandoah (ZR-1) begins at Naval Air Station Lakehurst, New Jersey.

=== July ===
- The first Coast Guard Air Station, Coast Guard Air Station Morehead City at Morehead City, North Carolina, closes, leaving the United States Coast Guard without an air base until 1926.
- July 1 – The United States Navy orders the incomplete battlecruisers USS Lexington and USS Saratoga to be completed as aircraft carriers.
- July 3 – Wheeler Field (the future Wheeler Air Force Base and later Wheeler Army Airfield) is dedicated adjacent to Schofield Barracks on Oahu in the Territory of Hawaii.
- July 4 – A commercial LVG C.VI piloted by Lothar von Richthofen – a World War I ace with 40 victories and the younger brother of the top-scoring World War I ace Manfred von Richthofen – and carrying the American actress Fern Andra and her companion director Georg Bluen as passengers, suffers engine failure and crashes at Fuhlsbüttel, Germany. Von Richthofen and Bluen die; Andra spends a year recovering from her injuries.
- July 6 – The first use of naval aircraft in combat in Latin America takes place in Brazil during the first Tenente revolt when two Brazilian Navy aircraft bomb the rebellious Fort Copacabana in Rio de Janeiro.
- July 10 – The Aircraft Development Corporation is incorporated in Michigan in the United States. It will change its name to Detroit Aircraft Corporation in 1929.
- July 16 – At Hampton Roads, Virginia, the United States Navy's only balloon ship, the lighter-than-air craft tender USS Wright (AZ-1), flies her balloon for the last time. She soon is rebuilt as a seaplane tender (AV-1) with no balloon capability.

=== August ===
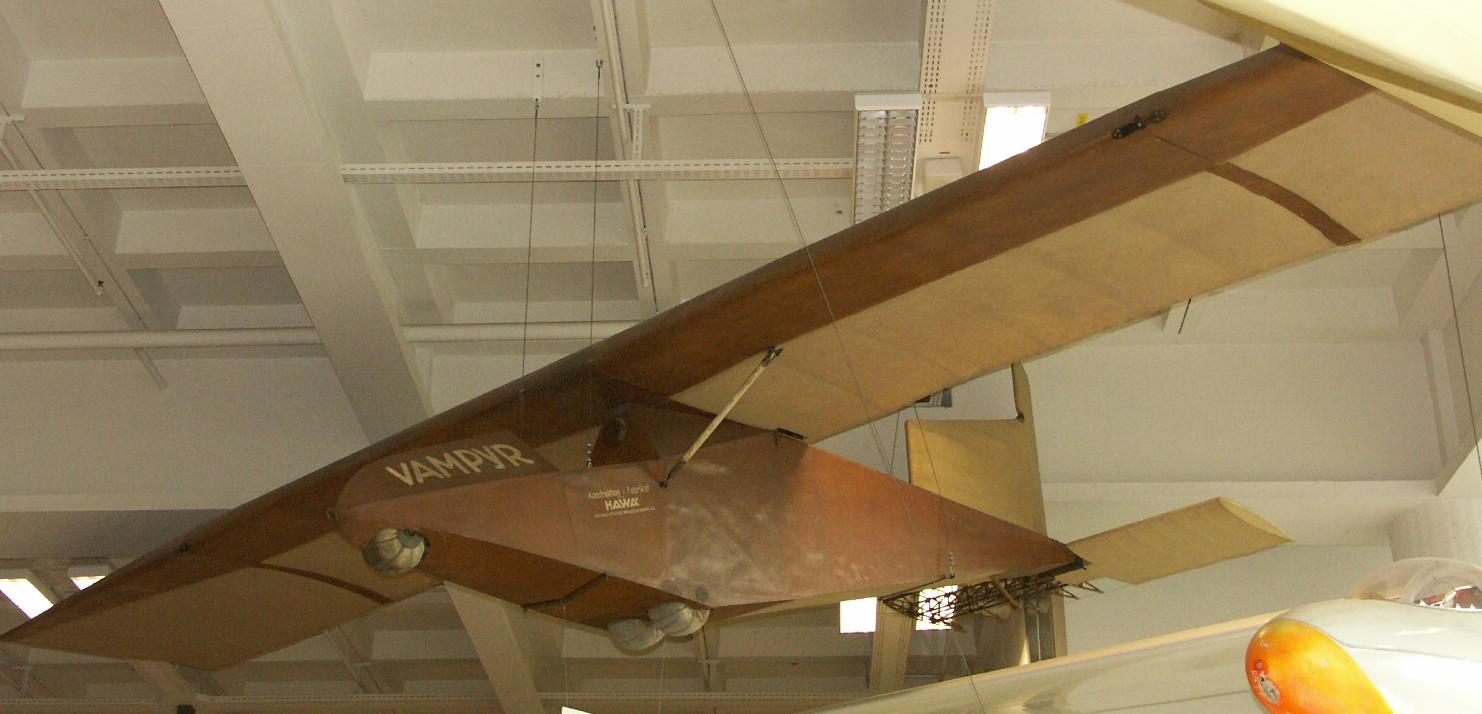
HAWA Vampyr

- Britain's Air Ministry issues its first requirement for a purpose-designed night fighter. Specification 25/22 will eventually be filled by the Hawker Woodcock.
- The first national French glider meeting, the Congrės expérimental d'aviation sans moteur, organized by the Association of French Flyers and partly funded by the French government, takes place in Combegrasse, Puy-de-Dôme.
- August 5 – The American Legion sponsors a "flying circus" at Luke Field on Ford Island in Pearl Harbor at Oahu, Hawaii, attracting thousands of spectators. The day's events include an airfield open house showcasing American military aircraft and aviation facilities, mass flyovers, aerobatic performances, aerial bombing demonstrations, parachuting, and airplanes towing swimmers on surfboards through the water at speeds up to 80 mph (130 km/h).
- August 7
  - The seventh annual Aerial Derby is held, sponsored by the Royal Aero Club. Ten participants fly over a 99-mile (159-kilometer) circuit beginning and ending at Croydon Airport in London with control points at Brooklands, Hertford, Epping, and West Thurrock; the aircraft fly the circuit twice. L. R. Tait-Cox is the overall winner, completing the course in a Gloster Mars III at an average speed of 177.85 mph (286.22 km/h) in 1 hour 6 minutes 48.4 seconds; L. L. Carter wins the handicap competition in a Bristol M.1D with a time of 1 hour 50 minutes 0.4 seconds at an average speed of 107.85 mph (173.57 km/h) with a handicap of 47 minutes 9 seconds.
  - The second annual Air League Challenge Cup race is held at Croydon Airport in London. Competitors race over a three-lap course in teams of three, with each team member physically passing a baton to the next team member after completing one lap. Two Royal Air Force teams – one representing the defending champions at RAF Kenley, the other representing RAF Uxbridge – are the only entrants. The race is cancelled when the second lap begins with the engine of RAF Kenley's Avro 504 refusing to start and RAF Uxbridge's Avro 504 crash-landing after suffering engine failure on takeoff, narrowly missing the crowd. One SE.5a from each RAF station continues with an informal, two-lap race, which RAF Uxbridge wins easily, but RAF Kenley retains the cup from 1921.
- August 10 – The 1922 Schneider Trophy race is flown at Naples, Italy. It is won by the only non-Italian competitor, H.C. Biard in a British Supermarine Sea Lion II, with a winning speed of 234.5 km/h (145.7 mph).
- August 15 – During a bombing show at Puck, Poland, an observer prematurely drops a bomb from a Lübeck-Travemünde F.4 floatplane. The bomb falls among spectators, killing 13 people and injuring 34.
- August 18 – Arthur Martens makes the first sailplane flight of over one hour during a glider competition at the Wasserkuppe in Germany, remaining aloft for 66 minutes. His aircraft, named Vampyr ("Vampire") is designed by Wolfgang Klemmperer.
- August 22 – Captain Norman Macmillan and cine-photographer Geoffrey Mallins are rescued from the Bay of Bengal when their civilianised Fairey IIIC floatplane suffers engine failure and capsizes after landing in the Indian Ocean at the beginning of the second leg of their attempt to make the first flight around the world. Major Wilfred T. Blake had already left the effort due to appendicitis, and Malin had replaced Lieutenant Colonel L. E. Broome. The two men are rescued from their overturned aircraft on August 24. They had taken 91 days reach Burma, and they are far behind schedule when their around-the-world attempt ends.

=== September ===
- September 4 – United States Army Lieutenant Jimmy Doolittle flies across the United States in under a day in a de Havilland DH.4. He takes 21 hours 19 minutes to fly from Pablo Beach, Florida, to Rockwell Field, California.
- September 9 – Captain Frank L. Barnard wins the first King's Cup Race air race, flying from Croydon Aerodrome (London) to Glasgow (Scotland) and back in 6 hours 32 minutes in an Airco DH.4A.
- September 20 – Joseph Sadi-Lecointe makes the first flight of over 200 mph (320 km/h), flying a Nieuport-Delage NiD 29.
- September 27 – The United States Navy conducts the first large-scale torpedo bombing exercises. Eighteen Naval Aircraft Factory PTs attack three battleships and score eight hits in 25 minutes.

=== October ===
- Under the terms of the secret Treaty of Rapallo with Bolshevik Russia and in a violation of the Treaty of Versailles, the German Junkers company secretly establishes an aircraft factory at Fili in the Soviet Union.
- October 6 – United States Army Air Service Lieutenants John A. Macready and Oakley G. Kelly set a flight endurance record of 35 hours 18 minutes in a Fokker T-2.
- October 8 – Lilian Gatlin arrives at Curtiss Field, Long Island, New York, becoming the first woman to cross the continental United States by airplane. She completes the 2,680-mile (4,316-km) flight in 27 hours 11 minutes. The flight is intended to promote the National Association of Aviation Gold Mothers, an organization she founded, and to encourage the United States Government to begin an annual commemoration of aviators who have given their lives "on the altar of patriotism and progress in pursuit of an ideal."
- October 14
  - The prototype of the Latécoère 4 crashes in France after being caught in a gust of wind, injuring both men on board. No further examples of the aircraft are built.
  - In the National Air Races at Selfridge Field in Michigan, U.S. Army Air Service First Lieutenant Lester J. Maitland places second in a Curtiss R-6 with an average speed of 198.8 mph (319.9 km/h) over the 50-kilometer (31-mile) course but during the race reaches a top speed of 216.1 mph (347.8 km/h), reputedly becoming the first U.S. pilot to exceed 200 mph (322 km/h). He receives a letter of congratulations from Orville Wright. Flying later in the day, however, U.S. Army Air Service test pilot First Lieutenant Russell Maughan, also in a Curtiss R-6, wins the race, averaging 205.386 mph (331 km/h) over five full laps. In addition, Maughan's flight sets two Fédération Aéronautique Internationale (FAI) official world records, achieving an average speed of 330.41 km/h (205.31 mph) over a distance of 100 kilometers (62.1 miles) and an average speed of 331.46 km/h (205.96 mph) over a distance of 200 kilometers (124.3 miles).
- October 16–21 – The Daily Mail sponsors a glider competition at Itford Hill in the South Downs east of Brighton, England, attracting 13 competitors. Alexis Manyrol of France wins with a world-record 201-minute flight in his Peyret tandem monoplane glider; the best British performance is by Fred Raynham, who remains aloft for 113 minutes in his Handasyde glider.
- October 17 – United States Navy Lieutenant Virgil Griffin makes the first take-off from a U.S. aircraft carrier, taking off from USS Langley (CV-1) in a Vought VE-7SF.
- October 20 – United States Army Air Service Lieutenant Harold Harris makes the first parachute escape from a stricken aircraft, bailing out of a Loening PW-2 over Dayton, Ohio.
- October 22 – Flying a bright yellow Kinner Airster named The Canary, Amelia Earhart sets a new women's altitude record, reaching 14,000 feet (4,300 meters).
- October 26 – United States Navy Lieutenant Commander Godfrey Chevalier makes the first landing on the aircraft carrier USS Langley (CV-1), flying an Aeromarine 39.

=== November ===
- The seventh Salon d'Aéronautique is held in Paris.
- Ras Haile Selassie, the future Emperor of Ethiopia, witnesses an air show by the British Royal Air Force in Aden, seeing airplanes for the first time and becoming the first Ethiopian to ride in one. He becomes an advocate for the creation of an Imperial Ethiopian Air Force, which will be founded in August 1929.
- November 2 – Qantas begins its first scheduled flights, between Charleville, Queensland and Cloncurry, Queensland.
- November 7 – German World War I air aces Paul Bäumer and Harry von Bülow-Bothkamp found Bäumer Aero as a company selling aircraft, airships, and accessories for airports. The company later designs and manufactures aircraft.
- November 8 – The United States Army Air Service′s Air Service Field Officers School at Langley Field, Virginia – predecessor of the Air Corps Tactical School – is renamed the Air Service Tactical School.
- November 11 – Etienne Oehmichen reaches an altitude of 525 m (1,722 ft) in a helicopter.
- November 12 – Japan's first airmail service commences, linking Sakai, Osaka, and Tokushima.
- November 18 – The first use of an aircraft catapult to launch a plane from an aircraft carrier takes place, when the U.S. Navy carrier USS Langley (CV-1) launches a Naval Aircraft Factory PT piloted by Commander Kenneth Whiting.
- November 19 – Malert (Magyar Legiforgalmi), a forerunner of MALÉV Hungarian Airlines, is formed.
- November 28 – The first use of skywriting for advertising in the United States takes place over New York City during a visit by British skywriting pilots Jack Savage and Cyril Turner.

=== December ===
- The United States Navy's first aircraft carrier, USS Langley (CV-1), embarks her first standard air complement, Fighter Squadron 1 (VF-1), equipped with Naval Aircraft Factory/Curtiss TS-1 fighters.
- December 27 – Hōshō, Japan's first aircraft carrier, is commissioned. She is the world's first aircraft carrier designed and built as such to be commissioned.
- December 31 – A Deutsche Luft-Reederei Dornier Komet becomes the first German aircraft to fly over the United Kingdom since the end of World War I.

== First flights ==
- Blackburn Blackburn
- Cox-Klemin XS
- Levasseur-Abrial A-1
- Potez X
- Thomas-Morse MB-9

=== January ===
- January 3 – Aero A.10
- January 12 – Mitsubishi 2MR

=== February ===
- Latécoère 8

=== March ===
- Breguet 19
- Loening PA-1
- March 26 – de Havilland DH.34

=== June ===
- de Havilland DH.37
- June 8 – Bellanca CF

=== July ===
- Bristol Racer
- July 14 – Junkers T 19

=== August ===
- Mitsubishi 1MT
- August 14 – Dewoitine P-2
- August 22
  - Aeromarine PG-1
  - Vickers Victoria
- August 31 – J-1, first U.S. Navy J-class blimp

=== September ===
- September 27 – Curtiss R-6
- September 29 – Thomas-Morse R-5, also known as the Thomas-Morse TM-22

=== October ===
- October 11 – Navy-Wright NW Mystery Racer
- October 13 – Curtiss R-6

=== November ===
- FBA 10
- Levasseur PL.2
- November 6 – Dornier Do J
- November 18 – Dewoitine D.1
- November 24 – Vickers Virginia
- November 28 – Fairey Flycatcher

=== December ===
- Martin MO
- December 5 – Potez XVIII
- December 11 – Potez XI

== Entered service ==
- Avro 555 Bison with No. 3 Squadron, Royal Air Force
- Nieuport-Delage NiD.29
- Vickers Vernon with the Royal Air Force

== Retirements ==
- July – Caudron R.11 by the French Army's Service Aeronbautique
- August – Westland Wagtail by the Royal Air Force
