= 1923 in aviation =

This is a list of aviation-related events from 1923:

== Events ==
- The Gallaudet Aircraft Corporation is absorbed by the Consolidated Aircraft Corporation.
- During 1923, French Breguet 14T bis Sanitaire air ambulances evacuate 870 wounded French personnel from the Levant and French Morocco.

=== January ===
- Air Union is created by the merger of Compagnie des Messageries Aériennes (CMA) with Grands Express Aériens (CGEA).
- January 1
  - The French aviator Joseph Sadi-Lecointe sets a new air speed record, averaging 335 km/h (208 mph) at Istres, France.
  - Canada′s Air Board is officially absorbed into the Department of National Defence. The Canadian Air Force becomes responsible for the control and regulation of all civil aviation in Canada.
- January 9 or 17 – The Cierva C.4, designed by Juan de la Cierva y Cordoniu and piloted by Alejandro Gomez Spencer, makes its first flight, covering a distance of about 180 meters (590 feet) at Cuatro Vientos airfield in Spain. It is the first flight by an autogyro, and the first stable flight by any form of rotary-wing aircraft.
- January 13 – The Aeromarine Airways Aeromarine 75 flying boat Columbus suffers engine failure during a flight from Key West, Florida, to Havana Cuba, and lands in the Florida Strait. Buffeted by 10-to-15-foot (3-to-4.5-meter) waves, it begins to fill with water. Four passengers die, but the ferry ship H. M. Flagler saves the other three passengers and both crew members.
- January 20 – After suffering an engine failure in flight, the Cierva C.4 autogyro uses autorotation to land without damage.
- January 24
  - The Government of Italy establishes a Commission for the Air Force, with Prime Minister Benito Mussolini as commissioner and Aldo Finzi as his deputy.
  - The Italian press reports that in a test of the Italian armed forces′ ability to get all their airplanes into the air at the same time and keep them flying for one hour, only 76 were able to do so. The armed forces′ own statistics report that the Italian Royal Army had 237 aircraft in working order and the Regia Marina (Italian Royal Navy) had 48. The discrepancy arises from Prime Minister Benito Mussolini′s to depict his predecessors in the Italian government as militarily incompetent.
- January 31 – The Cierva C.4 flies a 4-kilometer (2.5-statute mile) circuit at Cuatro Vientos airfield in Spain.

=== February ===
- The Royal Air Force conducts operations in southern Iraq against uprisings led by Sheik Mahmud Barzenci.
- A British pilot, William Jordan, lands a Mitsubishi 1MF fighter on the Imperial Japanese Navy's new aircraft carrier Hōshō, then takes off from Hōshō. It is the first landing on and first take off from a Japanese aircraft carrier.
- The title "Royal" is granted to the Canadian Air Force. The Government of Canada will approve the title on 1 April 1924, establishing the Royal Canadian Air Force.
- February 1 – The Danish Army Flying Corps is established.
- February 15 – The French aviator Joseph Sadi-Lecointe sets a new world air speed record, averaging 377 km/h (234 mph) at Paris, France.

=== March ===
- The British Sempill Mission to Japan, led by Sir William Francis Forbes-Sempill, returns to the United Kingdom. During its 18-month stay in Japan, the Mission has greatly improved Imperial Japanese Navy aviation training and understanding of aircraft carrier flight deck operations and the latest naval aviation tactics and technology, and the aircraft it brought to Japan will inspire the design of a number of Japanese naval aircraft of the 1920s.
- Chilean President Arturo Alessandri separates the Chilean naval aviation arm from the Chilean Army air corps, placing it under Chilean Navy control.
- The Chilean Navy installs its first aircraft catapult aboard the battleship Almirante Latorre.
- March 16 – Imperial Japanese Navy Lieutenant Shunichi Kira lands a Mitsubishi 1MF fighter on the aircraft carrier Hōshō, becoming the first Japanese pilot to land on an aircraft carrier.
- March 17
  - Dobrolyot is formed as the first Soviet civil aviation service; it will become part of the flag carrier Aeroflot.
  - The United States government authorizes United States Army Air Service aircraft to drop calcium arsenate on Louisiana's cotton fields in order to kill weevils.
- March 20 – El Salvador forms the Salvadoran Army Air Force. It later will become the Salvadoran Air Force.
- March 28 – The Italian Army′s air arm, the Corpo Aeronautico Militare, becomes an independent air force, the Regia Aeronautica (Royal Air Force).
- March 29 – Flying a Curtiss R-6 at Wilbur Wright Field outside Dayton, Ohio, United States Army Air Service First Lieutenant Russell Maughan averages 239.1 mph (384.8 km/h) over a 1-kilometer (0.62-mile) course, setting an unofficial world speed record, and reaches a top speed measured at 260.5 mph (419.2 km/h). Less than an hour later, First Lieutenant Lester J. Maitland reaches 243 mph (391 km/h) in another Curtiss R-6, setting another unofficial world absolute speed record, and reaches a top speed measured at 281.4 mph (452.9 km/h), but Orville Wright, as official observer for the National Aeronautics Association, disqualifies the pilots from recognition for the official record because they fail to sustain level flight, using a dive to gain speed. Official observers estimate that the pilots reach an unmeasured speed exceeding 300 mph (483 km/h) during their dives.

=== April ===
- April 1 – The Royal Air Force abandons the squadron as the basic organizational unit for those of its aircraft operating from Royal Navy ships, reorganizing them into six-plane flights.
- April 10 – Daimler Airways begins the first scheduled airline service between London and Berlin (via Bremen and Hamburg).
- April 16–17 – United States Army Air Service Lieutenants John Arthur Macready and Oakley G. Kelly establish a new endurance record, staying aloft for 36 hours 5 minutes in a Fokker T-2, covering a distance of 2,518 miles (4,052 km).

=== May ===
- May 1 – HMS Hermes enters service with the Royal Navy. She is the first ship designed from the waterline up as an aircraft carrier and the first aircraft carrier with an island superstructure to enter service.
- May 2–3 – United States Army Air Service Lieutenants John Arthur Macready and Oakley G. Kelly complete the first non-stop flight across the continental United States, flying from Hempstead, New York, to San Diego, California, covering 2,520 miles (4,056 km) in 26 hours 50 minutes in a Fokker T-2 at an average speed of over 100 mph (161 km/h).
- May 3
  - The Sikorsky Aero Engineering Corporation is formed by Igor Sikorsky at a Long Island chicken farm.
  - The Fifth International Conference of American States — held at Santiago, Chile, from March 25 to May 3 — concludes. During the conference, delegates had adopted a resolution providing for the creation of an InterAmerican Commercial Aviation Commission to meet to consider problems relating to aviation, draw up conclusions in the form of one or more conventions, and submit the convention or conventions to the member countries of the Pan-American Union for ratification.
- May 10 – Brazil establishes a School of Naval Aviation in Rio de Janeiro near Galeão beach on Governador Island. Rio de Janeiro–Galeão International Airport eventually will be constructed on the site.
- May 14 – A Farman F.60 Goliath operated by Air Union on a flight from Paris-Le Bourget Airport outside Paris, France, to Croydon Airport in London, England, loses a wing in flight, crashes near Monsures, France, and is destroyed by fire. All six people on board die.
- May 21 – A Curtiss bomber and two Curtiss scout aircraft of the Argentine Navy make a flight of just under 500 miles (800 km) along the coast of Argentina from Puerto Militar to Buenos Aires. It is a significant step forward in the development of Argentine aviation.
- May 23 – The Belgian airline SABENA is formed, adding new European routes to SNETA's routes in Belgian Congo that it takes over.
- May 29
  - Albert Louis Deullin, a French World War I flying ace credited with 20 aerial victories, dies in a flying accident while testing the prototype of a new airplane at Villacoublay airfield in Villacoublay, France.
  - Reuben Fleet founds Consolidated Aircraft Corporation.

=== June ===
- The United States Army Air Service demonstrates an aerial refueling system using two Airco DH.4 aircraft. The system employs a hose with an on/off nozzle and large funnels.
- The admirals′ committee of the Regia Marina (Italian Royal Navy) pronounces itself in favor of the construction of at least one aircraft carrier to operate with the Italian fleet, providing the fleet with air defense as well as an offensive aerial strike capability.
- June 14 – New Zealand forms its first military aviation services, fore-runners of the Royal New Zealand Air Force.
- June 23 – While Ernest Foot — a British World War I flying ace credited with five aerial victories — is competing in the first Grosvenor Challenge Cup, his Bristol M.1D monoplane crashes between Chertsey and Chobham, England, bursting into flames and killing him instantly.

=== July ===
- Twenty-one aircraft compete in the Grand Prix de Motoaviette – a competition at Buc, Yvelines, France, open to any aircraft with a maximum takeoff weight of less than 250 kilograms (550 pounds), offering a 125,000 FF prize for the fastest flight of 30 laps around a 10-kilometer (6.2-mile) course. Lucien Coupet wins in a Salmson 3 Ad-powered Farman Aviette, covering 310 kilometers (190 miles) in 4 hours 37 minutes 19 seconds.
- July 4 – The American aviator B. H. DeLay — who had pioneered many popular stunts used in early barnstorming airshows, adapted them to movies, then appeared in movies with top Hollywood stars — and his passenger die while DeLay is performing stunts before thousands of spectators over Ocean Park in Santa Monica, California, when the wings of his plane — the Wasp — fold back at the top of a loop-the-loop and the plane plunges nose-first into the ground. An investigation reveals that pins of a substandard size had been used in the wings, indicating sabotage. No culprit ever was identified.

=== August ===
- The Regia Aeronautica (Italian Royal Air Force) participates in Italian Royal Army maneuvers south of Lake Garda intended to test the capabilities of the army's celeri divisions. The air force component of the maneuvers tests aerial reconnaissance capabilities and the effectiveness of attacks on enemy troops by 32 fighter aircraft and of night attacks against bridges by two bombers. Although the reconnaissance is deemed "indispensable," it is not effective due to command and control problems. The fighter and night bombing attacks are more successful, although the ground troops′ failure to attempt to take cover from or evade air attack is of significant help to the fighters.
- Personnel from the aircraft carrier USS Langley (CV-1) help to install a TS-1 floatplane fighter on the foredeck of the destroyer USS Charles Ausburn (DD-294) at Norfolk, Virginia, as the United States Navy begins to experiment with the operation of seaplanes from destroyers. The TS-1 flies successfully, but its presence interferes with Charles Ausburn's routine too much, and the idea is dropped.
- August 6
  - The eighth annual Aerial Derby is held, sponsored by the Royal Aero Club. Thirteen participants fly over a 99.5-mile (160-kilometer) circuit beginning and ending at Croydon Airport in London with control points at Brooklands, Hertford, and West Thurrock; the aircraft fly the circuit twice. L. L. Carter is the overall winner, completing the course in a Gloster Mars at an average speed of 192.4 mph (309.6 km/h) in 1 hour 2 minutes 23 seconds; H. A. Hammersley wins the handicap competition in an Avro Viper with a time of 1 hour 49 minutes 56 seconds at an average speed of 109.5 mph (176.2 km/h) with a handicap of 51 minutes 38 seconds. It is the last Aerial Derby; plans for another one in 1924 will be cancelled due to a lack of high-speed entrants, and later talk of reviving the event comes to nothing.
  - The third annual Air League Challenge Cup race is held as part of the Aerial Derby programme at Croydon Airport in London. The team relay race format of previous races is dropped; instead, the 16 competitors – all Royal Air Force pilots – compete individually, each flying a Bristol F.2B Fighter fitted with a 275-horsepower (205-kilowatt) Rolls-Royce Falcon engine over a 100-mile (161-kilometer) triangular course. Captain Horace Scott Shield, representing RAF Eastchurch, wins the race.
- August 21 – The first electric airway beacons start appearing at airfields in the United States to assist in night flying operations.
- August 27 – A Farman F.60 Goliath operated by Air Union on a scheduled passenger flight from Berck-sur-Mer Airport in Berck-sur-Mer, France, to Croydon Airport in London, England, makes an unscheduled landing at Lympne, England, for repairs to its overheating left engine. After it continues its flight to Croydon, its right engine fails. Its pilot attempts a forced landing on East Malling Heath, but goes into a spin and crashes on final approach when passengers misunderstand an instruction for some of them to move towards the rear of the aircraft, affecting the Goliath's center of gravity. One passenger dies, but the other 10 passengers and both crew members survive.
- August 28 – United States Army Air Service Lieutenant John Richter and Lowell Smith establish a new endurance record of 37 hours 15 minutes in an Airco DH.4, covering 3,293 miles (5,300 km). They are refueled fifteen times during the flight.

=== September ===
- September 1 – The Imperial Japanese Navy aircraft carrier Amagi is heavily damaged by the Great Kantō earthquake while still under conversion from a battlecruiser. She is scrapped, and the battleship Kaga is selected for conversion into an aircraft carrier instead.
- September 4 – The United States Navy's first U.S.-built rigid airship, the as-yet-unnamed ZR-1, makes her first flight at Naval Air Station Lakehurst, New Jersey. She contains most of the world's extracted reserves of helium at this time.
- September 5
  - The French Nieuport-Delage NiD 40R sets a new world altitude record of 10,741 meters (35,240 feet).
  - United States Army Air Service bombers carry out anti-shipping exercises, sinking the obsolete battleships USS Virginia (BB-13) and USS New Jersey (BB-16).
- September 10 – United States Marine Corps Lieutenant Lawson H. Sanderson sets a new world airspeed record of 238 mph (383 km/h) in a Navy-Wright NW.
- September 28
  - The 1923 Schneider Trophy race flown at Cowes in the United Kingdom. David Rittenhouse of the United States wins in a Curtiss CR-3 at an average speed of 285.5 km/h (177.4 mph).
  - The United States Army blimp OB-1 is destroyed in a crash at Highland, Illinois.

=== October ===
- October 4 – A Caudron G.3 with Italian aviator Enrico Massi — an aviation pioneer in El Salvador — and Juan Ramón Munés — one of El Salvador's first pilots — aboard suffers an engine failure during an instructional flight and crashes in Soyapango, El Salvador. Munés survives, but Massi is killed.
- October 6
  - Curtiss R2Cs win first and second place in the Pulitzer Trophy Race, the winning aircraft setting a new airspeed record of 243.6 mph (392.0 km/h).
  - Burt E. Skeel wins the second running of the Mitchell Trophy Race in St. Louis, Missouri, reaching a speed of 161 mph (259 km/h) in a Thomas-Morse MB-3A.
  - Czech Airlines is founded by the government of Czechoslovakia as CSA Československé státní aerolinie ("Czechoslovak State Airlines"), commencing operations on October 29 with a Prague Kbely–Bratislava flight.
- October 8–13 – The Daily Mail sponsors the Motor Glider Competition at Lympne Aerodrome in Lympne, England, the first of the three light airplane trials held there. The contest rewards the most economical aircraft as well as the highest speed, highest altitude, and greatest endurance. Bert Hinkler is among the prize-winners. Record-setting French pilot Alexis Maneyrol dies in the crash of his Peyret Monoplane on the final day.
- October 10 – The United States Navy's first U.S.-built rigid airship, ZR-1. is christened and commissioned and receives her name: USS Shenandoah (ZR-1).
- October 13 – Flying over Lympne Aerodrome during the light aircraft trials there, an Avro 558 sets an altitude record for a light aircraft of its class, reaching 13,850 feet (4,220 meters).
- October 14 – United States Army Air Service pilot First Lieutenant Lester J. Maitland sets an official world speed record of 244.94 mph (394.19 km/h) in a Curtiss R-6.
- October 18 – French pilot Adrienne Bolland sets a world record for consecutive loop-the-loops by a woman, completing 98 loops.
- October 23 – General Pier Ruggero Piccio becomes the first Commandant General of the Italian Regia Aeronautica (Royal Air Force). When he leaves the position in 1925, the position will be renamed Chief of Air Staff.
- October 30 – Flying the Nieuport-Delage NiD 40R, the French pilot Joseph Sadi-Lecointe sets a new world altitude record of 11,145 meters (36,565 feet). The record will stand until 1927.
- October 31 – The Italian armed forces are ordered to test their efficiency by getting all of their airplanes into the air and flying them for one hour; 420 aircraft pass the test.

=== November ===
- During a speech at Centocelle Airport in Rome, Italian Prime Minister Benito Mussolini says, "As head of the government with the enormous responsibility of the existence, independence, freedom, and well-being of the Italian people, I am obliged not to believe in universal peace, and still less in perpetual peace. No one knows whether the war of tomorrow will be exclusively an aerial or a land or a naval war. For me, it is enough to ponder on what others are doing. If others are arming in the skies, then we must arm in the skies."
- The French Air Force has a force of 296 bombers and 300 fighters. Other than Italy, France is the only European continental power building a substantial air force.
- November 1 – The Goodyear Tire and Rubber Company buys the rights to manufacture Luftschiffbau Zeppelin dirigibles in the United States.
- November 2 – Flying a Curtiss R2C-1, U.S. Navy Lieutenant H. J. Rowe sets a new world airspeed record of 259.16 mph (417.08 km/h).
- November 3 – Harold Albert Kullberg, an American World War I flying ace who flew with the British Royal Air Force and was credited with 19 aerial victories, sees an airplane illegally performing stunts over an urban area, chases it down, lands with it, and arrests the pilot. It is the first arrest in the United States for the violation of civil aviation rules.
- November 4 – Flying a Curtiss R2C-1, U.S. Navy Lieutenant Alford J. Williams sets a new world airspeed record of 266.6 mph (429.1 km/h).
- November 18 – During an air show at Kelly Field, Texas, the first aerial refueling-related fatality in history occurs when the fuel hose becomes entangled in the right wings of both the refueler and the receiver aircraft. The United States Army Air Service pilot of the refueler, Lieutenant P. T. Wagner, dies in the ensuing crash of DH-4B 23-444.

=== December ===
- December 21 – The French dirigible Dixmude explodes over the Mediterranean Sea during a flight from Cuers-Pierrefeu, France, to French Algeria after being struck by lightning. Her entire crew of 52 perishes. Jean du Plessis de Grenédan, her commanding officer, is among the dead.

== First flights ==
- Avia BH-9
- Avro 558
- Avro 560
- FBA 13
- FBA 16
- Dayton-Wright PS-1
- Dewoitine P-3
- Engineering Division TP-1
- Farman F.120 Jabiru
- Grigorovich M-24
- Loening OL
- Naval Aircraft Factory NO
- Piaggio P.2
- Piaggio P.3

=== January ===
- Curtiss XPW-8, prototype of the Curtiss PW-8
- Mitsubishi 2MT, also known as Mitsubishi B1M
- January 9 or 17 (sources differ) – Cierva C.4, first successful autogyro flight
- January 19 – Armstrong Whitworth Wolf
- January 30 – Marinens Flyvebaatfabrikk M.F.7

=== March ===
- Aero A.18
- Hawker Woodcock
- March 8 – Fairey Fawn

=== April ===
- FBA 17
- April 29 – Boeing XPW-9, first prototype of the Boeing PW-9 and Boeing FB-1

=== May ===
- Armstrong Whitworth Siskin III
- Gloster Grebe
- May 9 – Blériot 115

=== June ===
- June 2 – Boeing XPW-9
- June 3 – Vickers Venture J7277
- June 12 – Junkers J 21 (also known as T 21 and H 21)
- June 28 – Armstrong Whitworth Awana

=== July ===
- Gerhardt Cycleplane
- July 1 – Nieuport-Delage NiD 40R
- July 30 – de Havilland DH.50

=== August ===
- August 2 – Wright F2W
- August 16 – Dewoitine P-3
- August 21 – ANEC I
- August 22 – Barling XNBL
- August 23 – Polikarpov IL-400, prototype of the Polikarpov I-1

=== September ===
- September 4 – USS Shenandoah (ZR-1)
- September 9 – Curtiss R2C-1
- September 7 – Handley Page Type S
- September 14 – Junkers T 23

=== October ===
- October 2 – de Havilland Humming Bird
- October 23 – Handley Page Hyderabad

=== November ===
- November 30 – Junkers J 22 (also known as T 22)

== Entered service ==
- Cox-Klemin XS
- Mitsubishi 1MF with Imperial Japanese Navy

== Retirements ==
- Airco DH.10 Amiens by the Royal Air Force
