= FBA 21 =

Type of aircraft built in the 1920s

Models 21 and 23
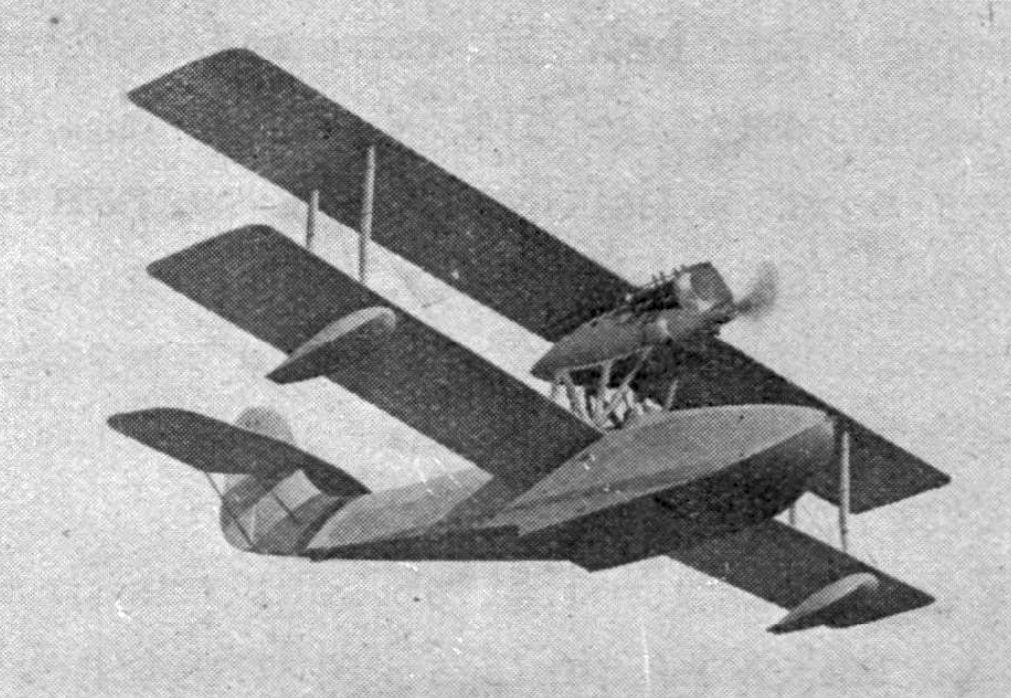
- FBA 21

General information
- Type: Flying boat airliner
- Manufacturer: FBA

History
- First flight: August 1925

The FBA 21 and 23 were small flying boat airliners built in France in the mid-1920s. Their development was an attempt by FBA to develop a commercial version of their FBA 19 bomber which had failed to attract orders from military buyers. Retaining the same basic design as their predecessor, the Model 21 added an enclosed cabin for four passengers. Unfortunately for FBA, they aroused as little interest as their military counterparts, and only a handful were built in a number of slight variations, including one example of a dedicated mail plane.

In 1926, Maurice Noguès had recently joined Compagnie des Messageries Transaériennes (CMT) and was looking for an aircraft to use on a new Paris-Saigon route. Accordingly, FBA rebuilt one of the Type 21s to optimise it for long-distance flight and redesignated it the Type 23. The W-12 engine was replaced with a radial, and the aircraft was generally lightened to allow for greater fuel capacity. Painted bright orange, the aircraft was extensively tested throughout late 1926, and apart from an early mishap while being flown by Noguès himself, flew over 6,000 km (3,700 mi) without incident. Nevertheless, the CMT contract went to the CAMS 53 and no further examples of the type were built.

== Variants ==
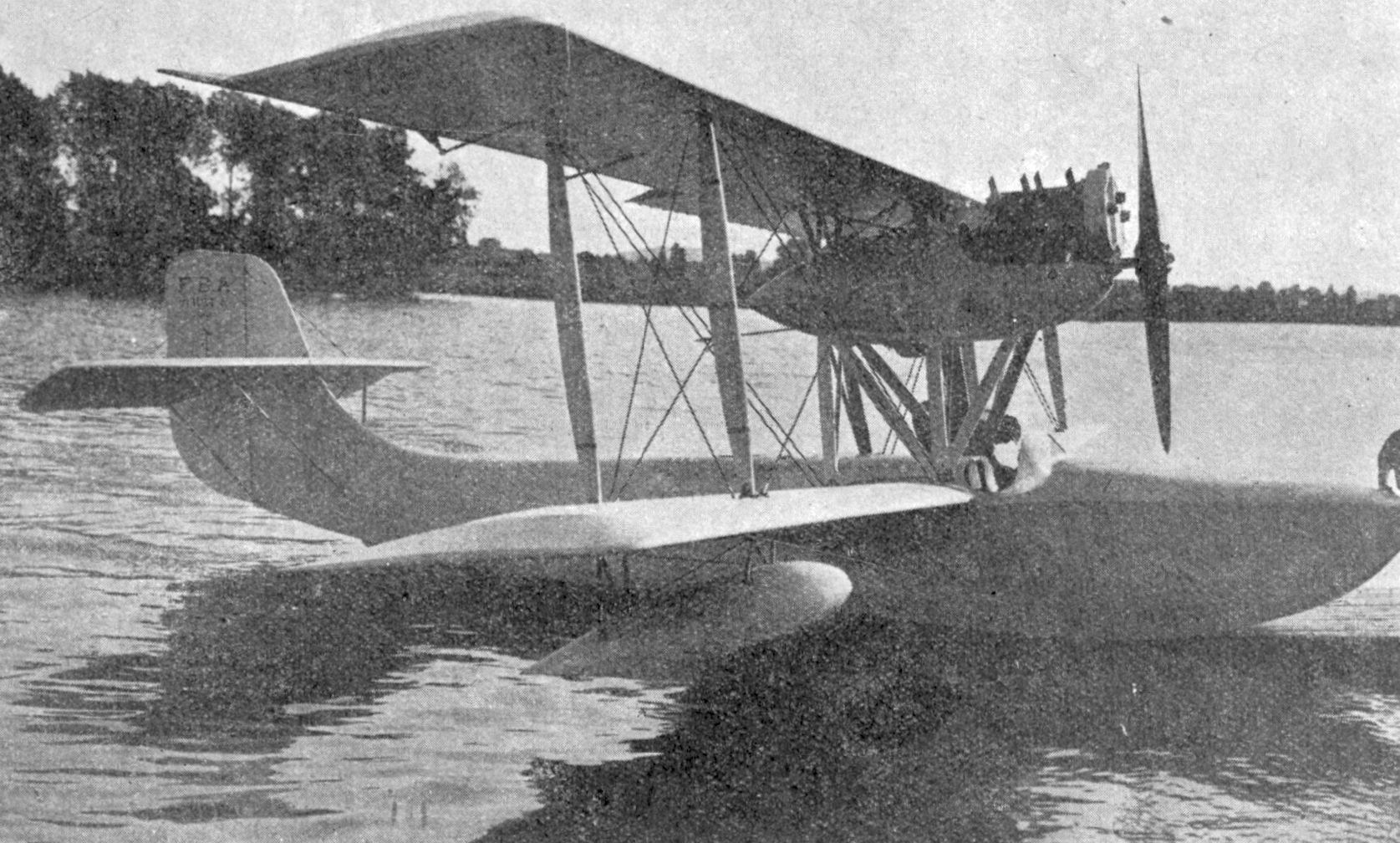
FBA 21 photo from L'Aérophile February,1926

21/1 HMT.5
amphibian airliner with Hispano-Suiza 12Ga W-12 engine (3 built)
21/2
amphibian airliner with Lorraine 12Eb W-12 engine (2 built)
21/3
flying boat airliner with Gnome et Rhône 9Ab radial engine (1 converted from 21/1)
21/4 HT.3
amphibian mailplane with Lorraine 12Ed W-12 engine (1 converted from 21/2)
23
long-distance flying boat airliner with Gnome et Rhône 9Ab radial engine (1 converted from 21/1)

== Specifications (21/1) ==
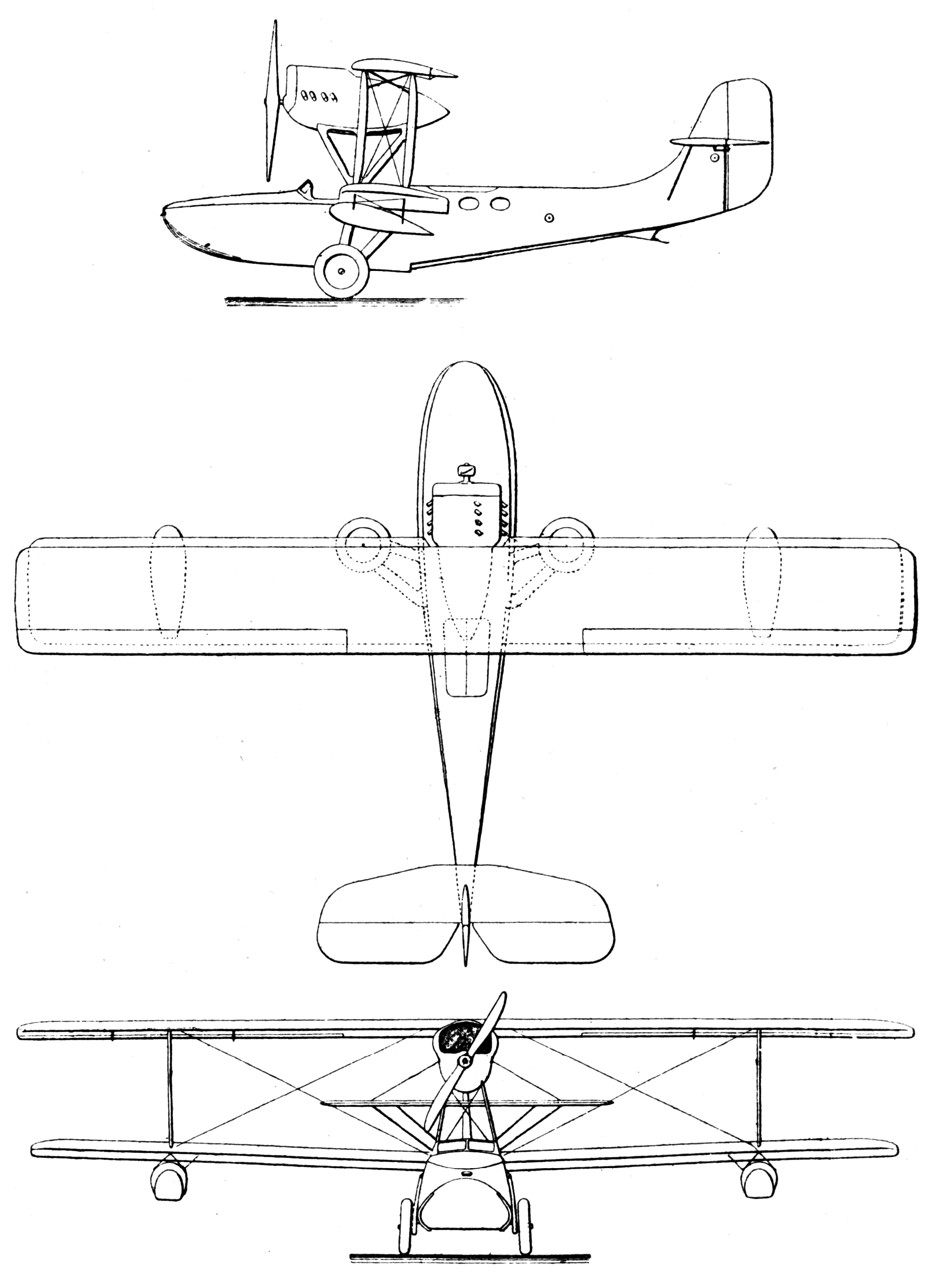
FBA 21 3-view drawing from L'Aérophile February,1926

Data from Jane's all the World's Aircraft 1928, Aviafrance:FBA 21/1

General characteristics

- Crew: 1
- Capacity: 4 pax
- Length: 10.56 m (34 ft 8 in)
- Wingspan: 15.4 m (50 ft 6 in)
- Height: 4.2 m (13 ft 9 in)
- Wing area: 53.5 m^{2} (576 sq ft)
- Empty weight: 1,820 kg (4,012 lb)
- Gross weight: 2,840 kg (6,261 lb)
- Powerplant: 1 × Hispano-Suiza 12Ga W-12 water-cooled piston engine, 340 kW (450 hp)

Performance

- Maximum speed: 190 km/h (120 mph, 100 kn)
- Range: 600 km (370 mi, 320 nmi)
- Service ceiling: 4,400 m (14,400 ft)
- Time to altitude: 1,000 m (3,300 ft) in 5 minutes 30 seconds
