= Aero A.19 =

- Biplane aircraft created by Czechoslovakia.

General information
- Type: Fighter aircraft
- Manufacturer: Aero Vodochody

The Aero A.19 was a biplane fighter aircraft. It was designed in Czechoslovakia in 1923 and considered by the Czech Air Force against its stablemates the A.18 and A.20. The A.18 was selected for production and development of the A.19 was abandoned.

== Specifications (A.19) ==
General characteristics

- Crew: 1
- Length: 7 m (23 ft 0 in)
- Wingspan: 8.4 m (27 ft 7 in)
- Wing area: 19.2 m^{2} (207 sq ft)
- Empty weight: 793 kg (1,748 lb)
- Gross weight: 1,003 kg (2,211 lb)
- Powerplant: 1 × Breitfeld & Danek Perun I , 130 kW (170 hp)

== See also ==
Related lists

- List of fighter aircraft
