= Aero A.20 =

Prototype fighter aircraft

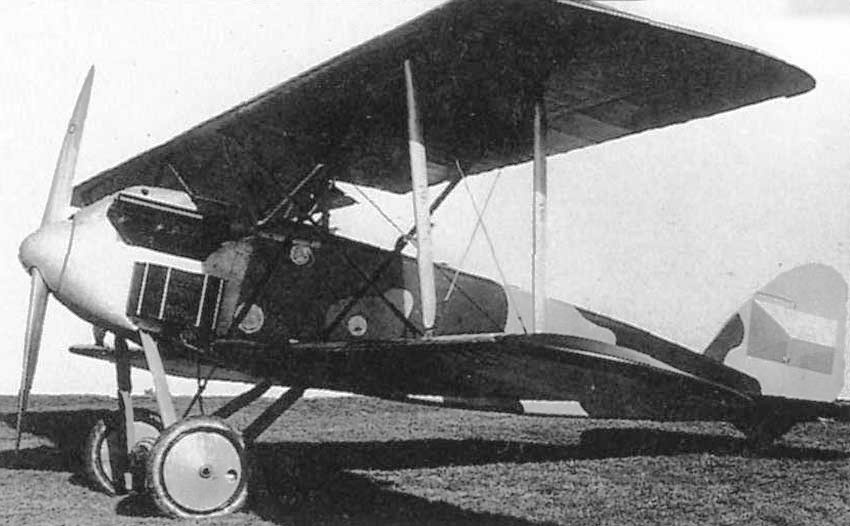

General information
- Type: Fighter aircraft
- Manufacturer: Aero Vodochody
- Status: Did not enter production
- Primary user: Czech Air Force
- Number built: 1

History
- Manufactured: 1923

The Aero A.20 was a biplane fighter aircraft built in Czechoslovakia in 1923. It was evaluated for Czechoslovak Air Force service against Aero's competing A.18 and A.19 designs, a competition that the A.18 won, meaning that this aircraft never entered production, and only a single prototype was ever built.

== Specifications (A.20) ==
General characteristics

- Crew: 1
- Length: 6.6 m (21 ft 8 in)
- Wingspan: 9.7 m (31 ft 10 in)
- Wing area: 23.3 m^{2} (251 sq ft)
- Empty weight: 784 kg (1,728 lb)
- Max takeoff weight: 1,080 kg (2,381 lb)
- Powerplant: 1 × Skoda-built Hispano-Suiza 8Fb V-8 water-cooled piston engine, 220 kW (300 hp)

Performance

- Maximum speed: 225 km/h (140 mph, 121 kn)
- Service ceiling: 7,500 m (24,600 ft)
- Rate of climb: 5.88 m/s (1,157 ft/min)

Armament

- Guns: 2× 7.7 mm (0.303 in) Vickers machine guns

== See also ==
Related development

- Aero A.18
- Aero A.19

Related lists

- List of fighter aircraft
