= FBA 310 =

Type 310
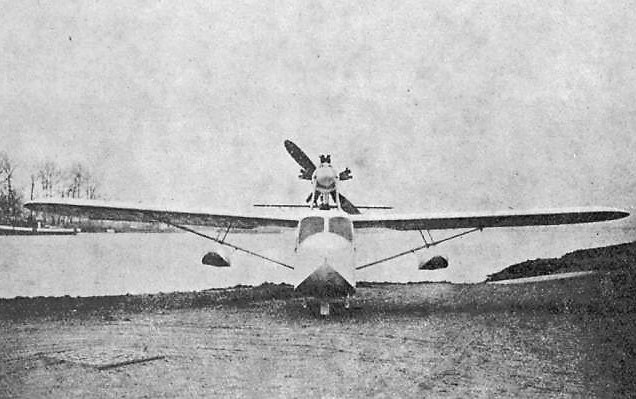

General information
- Type: Touring flying-boat or amphibian
- Manufacturer: Franco-British Aviation Company (FBA)
- Number built: 9

History
- First flight: 1930

The FBA Type 310 was a 1930s French touring flying boat or amphibian built by the Franco-British Aviation Company.

The Type 310 was the last design from FBA and was their only monoplane flying boat. Designed to sell into a growing market for touring flying-boats in the 1920s and 1930s, the 310 was a shoulder-wing flying boat with stabilizing floats attached to the struts that braced the wing to the hull. It was powered by a single 120 hp (89 kW) Lorraine 5Pc radial engine driving a pusher propeller. The engine was strut-mounted above the wing. The cabin accommodated a pilot and two passengers. The proposed price was set as 150000 FRF.

An amphibian version was also built as the 310/1, but the added weight of the landing gear meant that only one passenger could be carried. Design and development ceased in 1931 with the lack of both orders and funds, and the factory closed in 1934 when the company was sold to Société des Avions Bernard.

== Variants ==
Type 310
Production flying-boat, six built.
Type 310/1
Production amphibian, three built.

== Specifications (Type 310) ==
Data from The Illustrated Encyclopedia of Aircraft (Part Work 1982–1985), 1985, Orbis Publishing, Page 1634

General characteristics

- Crew: 1 pilot
- Capacity: 2 passengers
- Length: 7.60 m (24 ft 11.25 in)
- Wingspan: 12 m (30 ft 4.5 in)
- Height: 3.0 m (9 ft 10 in)
- Wing area: 21 m^{2} (226.05 sq ft)
- Empty weight: 670 kg (1,477 lb)
- Gross weight: 970 kg (2,138 lb)
- Powerplant: 1 × Lorraine 5Pc 5-cylinder radial piston engine , 89 kW (120 hp)

Performance

- Maximum speed: 145 km/h (90 mph, 78 kn)
- Range: 500 km (311 mi, 270 nmi)
- Service ceiling: 3,500 m (11,485 ft)

== See also ==
Related lists

- List of flying boats and floatplanes
