= Dewoitine P-3 =

Single-seat French glider, 1923

P-3

General information
- Type: Glider
- Manufacturer: Constructions Aéronautiques Émile Dewoitine
- Designer: Emile Dewoitine
- Number built: at least 2

History
- First flight: 1923
- Developed from: Dewoitine P-2

The Dewoitine P-3 was a glider designed by Emile Dewoitine and built by Constructions Aéronautiques Émile Dewoitine in the early 1920s.

== Designa and development ==
The P-3 was an early glider from France, built almost exclusively fromwood with fabric covering those parts not skinned in ply veneer. The airframe was simple with rectangular section fuselage, one-piece wing sat on top, an all flying tailplane for pitch control with a rectangular fin and large rudder. The undercarriage consisted of a tail-skid and two mainwheels partially housed in the fuselage on both sides. The pilot sat in an open cockpit at the forward part of the wing centre-section, with an opening in the wing skin for his/her head.

== Operational history ==
Two P-3 gliders were purchased for Czechoslovakia in 1923, taking part in national meets and competitions.

== Specifications ==
Data from aviafrance : Dewoitine P-3, letectvi.cz : Dewoitine P-3

General characteristics

- Length: 5.7 m (18 ft 8 in)
- Wingspan: 11.25 m (36 ft 11 in)
- Height: 1.25 m (4 ft 1 in)
- Wing area: 15.5 m^{2} (167 sq ft)
- Airfoil: Göttingen Gö 430
- Empty weight: 110 kg (243 lb)
- Gross weight: 180 kg (397 lb)

Performance
