= Aero Ae 04 =

Ae 04
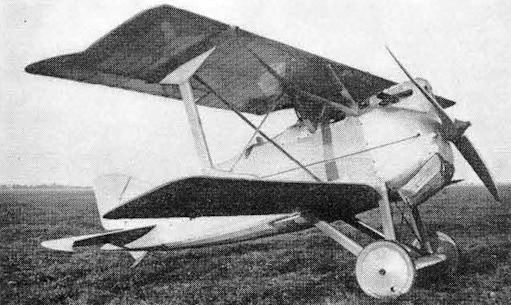

General information
- Type: Fighter
- Manufacturer: Aero
- Number built: 1

History
- First flight: 1921
- Developed from: Aero Ae 02
- Variants: Aero A.18

The Aero Ae 04 was a Czechoslovak biplane fighter aircraft of 1921. A development of the Ae 02, it was no more successful than its predecessor in attracting purchase orders, and it flew only in prototype form. Undaunted by the lack of interest, development continued as the A.18.

== Specifications (Ae 04) ==
Data from The Complete Book of Fighters

General characteristics

- Crew: 1
- Length: 5.6 m (18 ft 4 in)
- Wingspan: 7.7 m (25 ft 3 in)
- Wing area: 14.6 m^{2} (157 sq ft)
- Empty weight: 670 kg (1,477 lb)
- Gross weight: 900 kg (1,984 lb)
- Powerplant: 1 × BMW IIIa 6-cyl. water-cooled in-line piston engine, 138 kW (185 hp)

Performance

- Maximum speed: 225 km/h (140 mph, 121 kn)
- Cruise speed: 185 km/h (115 mph, 100 kn)
- Endurance: 1 hour
- Service ceiling: 6,000 m (20,000 ft)
- Time to altitude: 5,000 m (16,000 ft) in 14 minutes

Armament

- 2 x synchronised 7.92 mm (0.312 in) Vickers machine guns
