= Franco-British Aviation =

Aircraft manufacturer

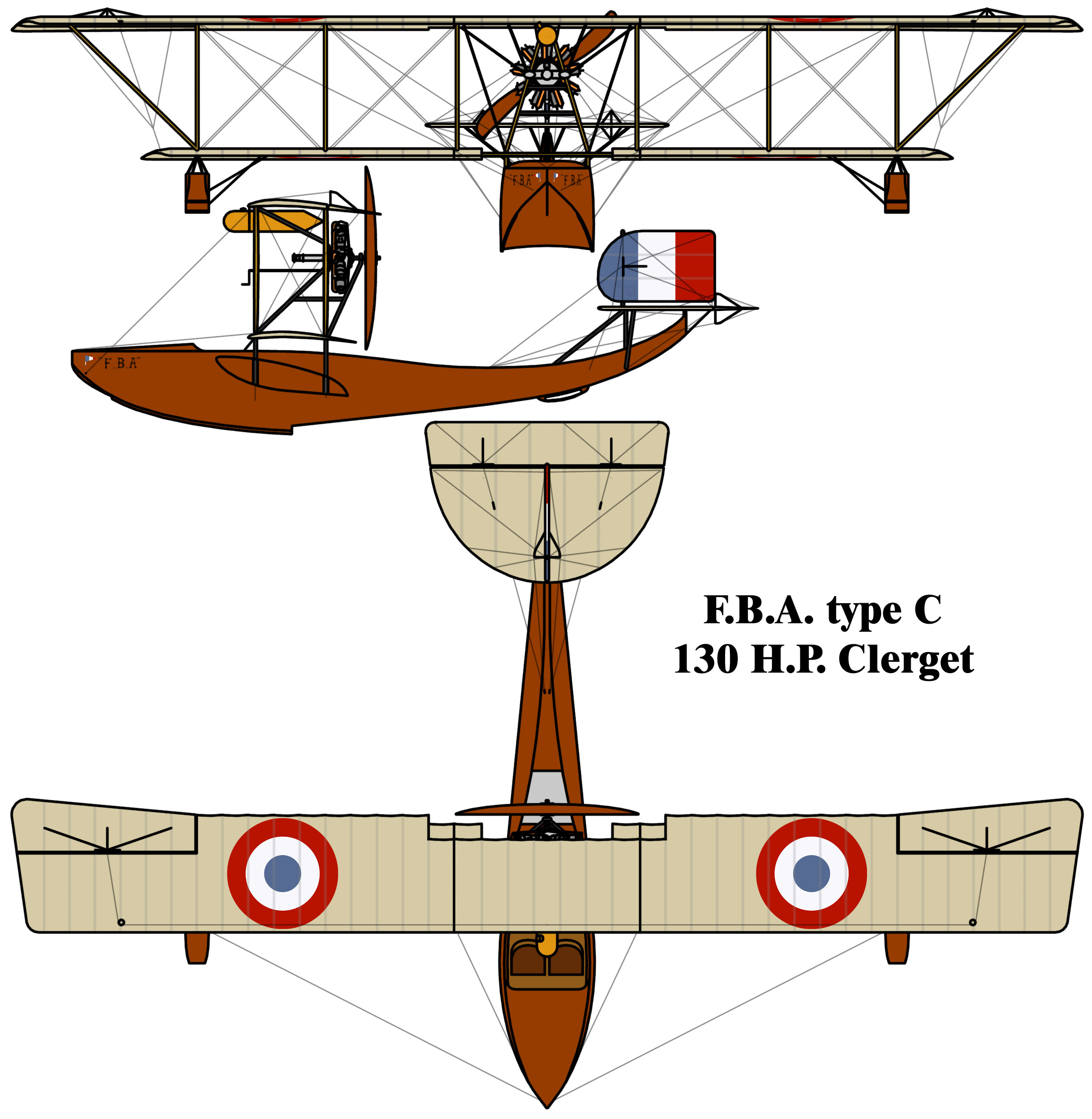
- Founded: 1913; 113 years ago in London, UK
- Founders: Louis Schreck; André Beaumont
- Successor: Hydravions Louis Schreck FBA; Société des Avions Bernard
- Headquarters: London, UK
- Products: Military aircraft

Franco-British Aviation (usually known by its initials FBA) was an aircraft manufacturer of the early 20th century, headquartered in London and with its production facilities around Paris. Specialising in seaplanes, it was established in 1913 by Louis Schreck and André Beaumont.

== History ==
The company was established in 1913 by Louis Schreck and André Beaumont.

Louis Schreck was technical director of the French subsidiary in Argenteuil. The first activity of the company was the development of a flying boat hull derived from Donnet-Leveque Type A. The aircraft, a biplane with a single engine mounted between the wings with a pusher propeller, was originally called FBA-Leveque, then it was renamed FBA Type A.

It is from this first model that the manufacturer derived various models that would be used by the forces of Triple Entente: France, United Kingdom and the Russian Empire.

During World War I, the company produced large numbers of small flying boats for the navies of France, Russia, Italy, and the United Kingdom.

Following the war, the company was reorganised as Hydravions Louis Schreck FBA, a purely French concern, and continued building aircraft in the same class. One of these, the FBA 17, sold in quantity.

In 1922, Émile Paumier became technical director and developed the brand models from the FBA model Type 10. From the Type 19 on, the company abandoned the conventional configuration with pusher propeller to finally adopt the tractor propeller.

The company could not repeat its wartime successes. The lack of orders, especially for civilian models, led to production ceasing in 1931. In 1934, on the verge of collapse, the workshops of the factory were sold to Bernard; the latter company was also struggling and itself failed later in 1935.

== Aircraft ==
Name	Type	Production	Notes	First flight	Operators
FBA Type A	Seaplane single-engine biplane recognition		Also called FBA-Leveque	1913	Austria-Hungary, Brazil, Denmark, France, Italy, Portugal, United Kingdom, Russia
FBA Type B	single-engine biplane seaplane	150		1915	France, United Kingdom
FBA Type C	single-engine biplane seaplane	78+		1916	
FBA Type H	single-engine biplane seaplane			1915	
FBA Type S	single-engine biplane seaplane			1917	
FBA 10	single-engine biplane seaplane	2		1922	
FBA 11	single-engine biplane training seaplane	1	Variant of Type C for training	1923	
FBA 13	single-engine biplane training seaplane	1		1922	
FBA 14	single-engine biplane seaplane	20	Development of Type 11 trainer		France
FBA 16	single-engine biplane seaplane	1			
FBA 17	Single-engine two-seater biplane training seaplane	348	Produced under licence in the United States as the Viking	1923	Brazil, France, Poland, United States
FBA 19	Amphibian biplane single-engine two-seat reconnaissance	9	A prototype version 19 HMT3 3-seater was built	1924	
FBA 21	single-engine civil transport amphibious biplane	7	Civilianized Type 19 for 4 passengers	1925	
FBA 171	Type 17 variant for use on catapult	1			
FBA 172	Type 17 variant for use on catapult	7		1932	
FBA 270	Biplane seaplane single-engine two-seat	1		1929	France
FBA 271	Amphibian biplane single-engine two-seat	2		1930	
FBA 290	Prototype amphibious seaplane single-engine biplane four-seat	1		1931	
FBA 291	Variant prototype amphibious type 290	1			
FBA 293	Variant of the type 291 – four-seat amphibious liaison	6			France
FBA 294	Variant of the type 293 – four-seat amphibious liaison	2			France
FBA 310	amphibious touring monoplane	9		1930	
