= Aero Ae 02 =

Ae 02
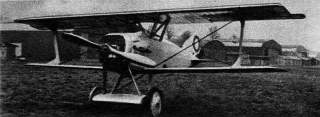

General information
- Type: Fighter
- National origin: Czecho-Slovakia
- Manufacturer: Aero
- Designer: Husnik and Vlasak
- Number built: 1

History
- First flight: 1920
- Developed into: Aero Ae 04

The Aero Ae 02 was the first fighter aircraft to be designed and built in Oshowitz. The Aero aircraft first flew in 1920.

== Design and development ==
Designed by Husnik and Vlasak, it was of conventional biplane configuration. The orthodox two spar upper wing was straight, without dihedral and constructed in one piece, was supported above the fuselage on two sets of outward sloping N struts and an inverted V cabane. The lower wing was in two sections attached to stub 'winglets' on the fuselage. Top and bottom planes were separated by one built up strut of [ formation with the main upright of the strut between the rear spars of the wings and the 'feet' pointing forward and attached to the front strut. Balanced ailerons were fitted to the top wing only operated by a rod and tubular hinge mechanism, rather than the more usual cables. A lifting cantilevered tailplane was fitted with divided and balanced elevators and the triangular tail fin carried a balanced rudder. The fuselage was designed to be built in Duralumin, but the prototype used welded steel tube. It was of approximately rectangular section with slightly convex panels all round and was internally wire braced. An auxiliary petrol tank of aerofoil section was mounted between the wheels and could be jettisoned by means of a quick release mechanism. The aircraft's performance was adequate for a fighter of its day, but the Czechoslovak Air Force was not interested in purchasing it.

Flown by Josef Novak, the Ae 02 went on to win the Silver Cup at the Czech Aeroclub's annual flying meet of 1921 for best overall performance. Development continued as the Ae 04.

== Specifications (Ae 02) ==
General characteristics

- Crew: 1
- Length: 5.45 m (17 ft 11 in)
- Wingspan: 8.24 m (27 ft 0 in)
- Height: 2.7 m (8 ft 10 in)
- Wing area: 16.7 m^{2} (180 sq ft)
- Empty weight: 545 kg (1,202 lb)
- Gross weight: 867 kg (1,911 lb)
- Powerplant: 1 × Hispano-Suiza 8Ba V-8 water-cooled piston engine, 164 kW (220 hp)

Performance

- Maximum speed: 225 km/h (140 mph, 121 kn)
- Rate of climb: 2.87 m/s (565 ft/min)

Armament

- Guns: 2 x synchronised .303 in (7.7 mm) Vickers machine guns

== See also ==
Related development

- Aero Ae 04
- Aero A.18
