= Aero A.18 =

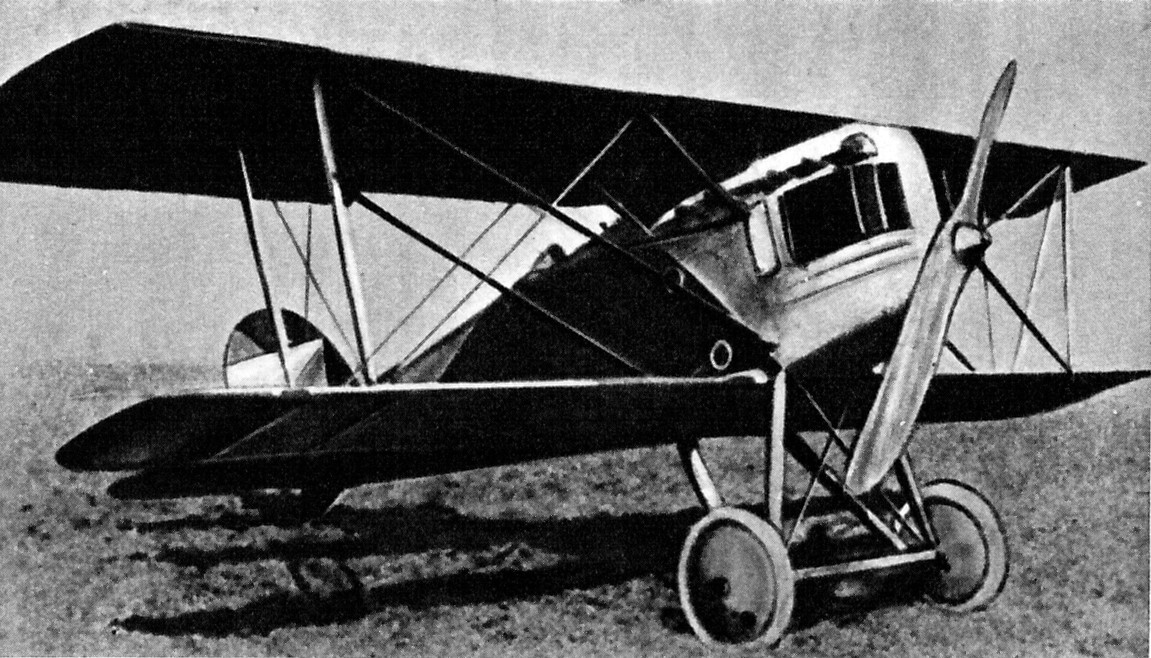

General information
- Type: Fighter aircraft
- National origin: Czechoslovakia
- Manufacturer: Aero Vodochody
- Designer: Antonin Vlasák; Antonin Husnik
- Status: 1 preserved at the Prague Aviation Museum
- Primary users: Czechoslovak Air Force Czech Aero Club
- Number built: 20

History
- Manufactured: 1920s
- First flight: March 1923
- Retired: 1939 (due to German invasion)

The Aero A.18 was a biplane fighter aircraft built in Czechoslovakia in the 1920s. It was a development of the Ae 02 and Ae 04 fighters Aero had designed during World War I, but also borrowed from the more recent A.11 reconnaissance-bomber design.

== Design and development ==
The A.18 was designed by Antonin Vlasák and Antonin Husnik and first flew in March 1923; only one of three prototype fighters that Aero flew that year, but this one was selected for production over the A.19 and A.20 that competed with it.

== Operational history ==
Twenty machines saw service with the Czechoslovak Air Force in the period between the wars.

The A.18B and A.18C were specially modified racing variants that competed in the Czech Aero Club's first two annual air races, in 1923 and 1924 respectively. Both aircraft won their races, and the A.18C is preserved at the Prague Aviation Museum in Kbely along with a replica of a standard A.18 fighter.

== Operators ==
- Czechoslovakia

== Specifications (A.18) ==
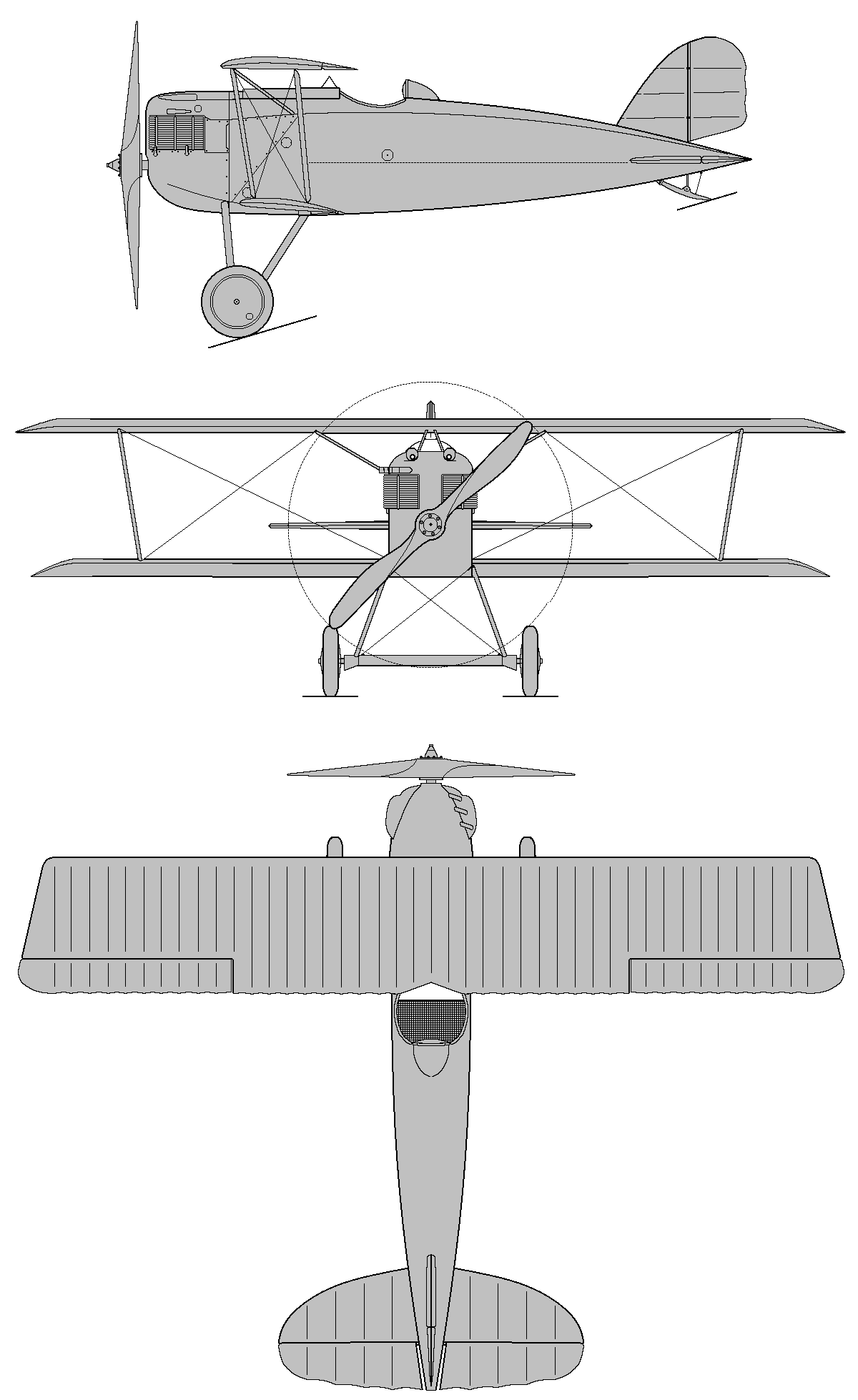

Data from The Complete Book of Fighters, Biplanes, Triplanes, and Seaplanes, Jane's all the World's Aircraft 1924

General characteristics

- Crew: 1
- Length: 5.9 m (19 ft 4 in)
- Wingspan: 7.6 m (24 ft 11 in)
- Height: 2.86 m (9 ft 5 in)
- Wing area: 15.9 m^{2} (171 sq ft)
- Empty weight: 637 kg (1,404 lb)
- Gross weight: 862 kg (1,900 lb)
- Powerplant: 1 × BMW IIIa 6-cyl. water-cooled in-line piston engine, 138 kW (185 hp)
- Propellers: 2-bladed wooden fixed-pitch propeller

Performance

- Maximum speed: 229 km/h (142 mph, 124 kn)
- Range: 400 km (250 mi, 220 nmi)
- Service ceiling: 9,000 m (30,000 ft)
- Rate of climb: 9.8 m/s (1,930 ft/min)
- Wing loading: 55.8 kg/m^{2} (11.4 lb/sq ft)
- Power/mass: 0.1565 kW/kg (0.0952 hp/lb)

Armament

- 2× 7.7 mm (0.303 in) Vickers machine-guns

== See also ==
Related development

- Ae 02
- Ae 04

Related lists

- List of fighter aircraft
- List of interwar military aircraft
