= FBA 270 =

1920s French aircraft

General information
- Type: Reconnaissance flying boat
- Manufacturer: FBA
- Primary user: Aéronavale
- Number built: 1

History
- First flight: 1929

The FBA 270 was a flying boat trainer built in France in the early 1920s.

== Development ==
The FBA 270 was a two-seat biplane flying boat of all-wood construction.

== Specifications ==
Data from

General characteristics

- Crew: 2, pilot and observer
- Length: 9.48 m (31 ft 1 in)
- Wingspan: 12.80 m (42 ft 0 in)
- Height: 3.64 m (11 ft 11 in)
- Wing area: 37.80 m^{2} (406.9 sq ft)
- Gross weight: 1,780 kg (3,924 lb)
- Powerplant: 1 × Salmson 9Ab 9-cylinder air-cooled radial piston engine, 170 kW (230 hp)
- Propellers: 2-bladed fixed-pitch pusher propeller

Performance

- Maximum speed: 170 km/h (110 mph, 92 kn)
- Range: 550 km (340 mi, 300 nmi)
- Service ceiling: 4,000 m (13,000 ft)
