= FBA Type H =

French reconnaissance flying boat

Type H
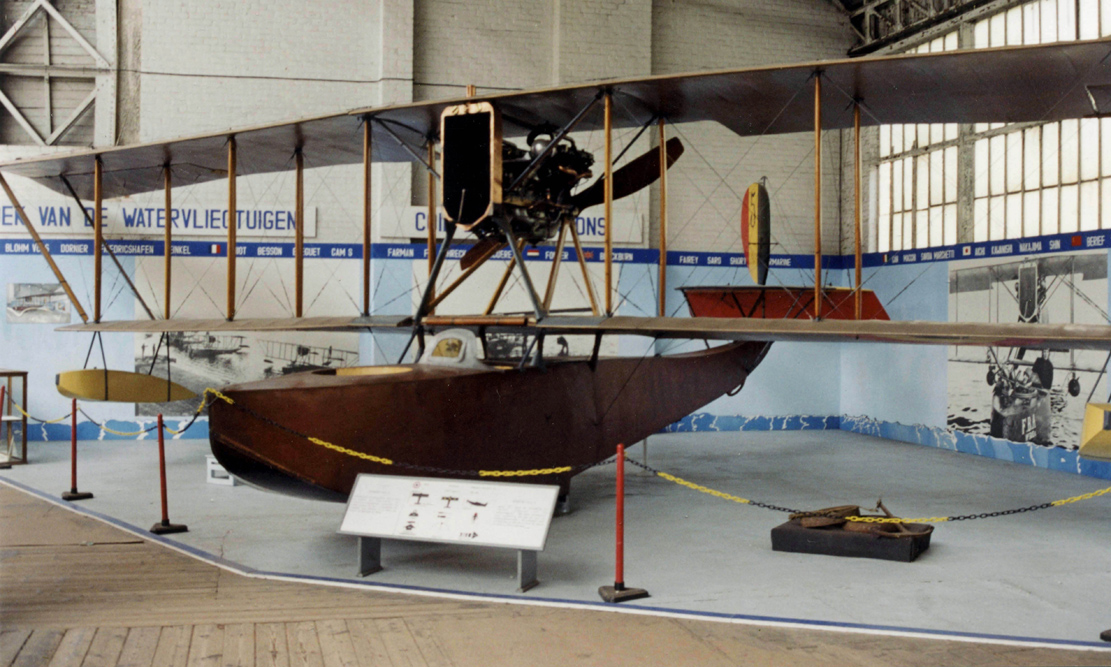
- FBA Type H flying boat on display at the Royal Museum of the Armed Forces and of Military History, Brussels, Belgium

General information
- Type: Reconnaissance flying boat
- Manufacturer: FBA
- Designer: Louis Schreck
- Status: one example preserved
- Number built: ca. 2000

History
- Introduction date: 1916
- First flight: 1915

The FBA Type H was a French reconnaissance flying boat produced in large numbers in France and Italy during World War I by Franco-British Aviation.

== Design and development ==
A development of the FBA Type A, the Type H shared the same basic pusher biplane configuration, but was a larger and heavier machine based on a Donnet-Lévêque design and powered by a water-cooled engine in place of the earlier type's rotary. Most French-built Type H aircraft had water-cooled V-8 Hispano-Suiza 8A variants with powers of 150 or 170 hp (110 or 130 kW), though a minority had 160 hp (120 kW) Lorraine 8Ns. Some Italian built Type Hs also used the higher-power Hispano motor but more had 180 hp (130 kW) Isotta Fraschini V.4B or 150 hp (110 kW) engines of the same make, both six-cylinder inlines.

The aircraft was a two bay biplane with the smaller span lower wing positioned just above the central fuselage on four supporting struts. There was no stagger and simple parallel interplane struts separated the bays; an extra, outward leaning pair supported the overhanging upper plane on each side. Ailerons were mounted only on this upper wing. The single pusher engine was mounted on struts just below the upper wing, its two blade propeller turning in a cut-out in the wing trailing edges.

The hull of the Type H was, like that of its predecessors, a single step design. A pair of flat bottomed floats, mounted below the outer interplane struts, stabilized the aircraft on the water. Two flight crew members were accommodated side-by-side and a front gunner sat separately in the nose. The rounded, finless rudder mounted above the high tailplane distinguished the Type H from earlier FBA flying boats, which had angular vertical tails.

== Production ==
Aside from its production in France, the type was also built extensively under licence in Italy by several firms, most importantly by SIAI.

== Variants ==
Type D
One Type H was built as a fighter aircraft to class D specifications, equipped with a 37 mm (1.46 in) Hotchkiss gun and powered by a 150 hp (110 kW) Hispano-Suiza 8A or 175 hp (130 kW) Hispano-Suiza 8Aa. Although this was a landplane, its fuselage retained its basic flying boat form. Avion Cannon was its common name, though was also called the FBA 1 Ca2, or Type D cannon fighter.
Type S
The Aviation Maritime issued a Type S specification for a light patrol bomber to be powered by a 200 hp (150 kW) Hispano-Suiza 8Bb or 210 hp (160 kW) Hispano-Suiza 8Bbd. Schreck modified a Type H with larger folding wings and longer hull. Entering service in 1917 the Type S flying boats remained in service until 1923, until replaced by Latham and Blanchard flying boats.

== Operational history ==
The Type H was the major production version of the FBA series and was operated by several air arms during the latter part of the First World War. The great majority served with French and Italian forces. The Escadrille des Hydroavions (Seaplane Squadron) of the Belgian Air Force was also equipped with the type and one survives on display in the Royal Museum of the Armed Forces and of Military History in central Brussels. The British Royal Navy used four ex-Italian Type Hs powered by Isotta Fraschini engines as training machines.

From 1926 to at least 1929 twelve FBA Hs were used in Canada by the Compagnie Aerienne Franco Canadienne to make an aerial photographic survey of both cities and countryside.

== Operators ==
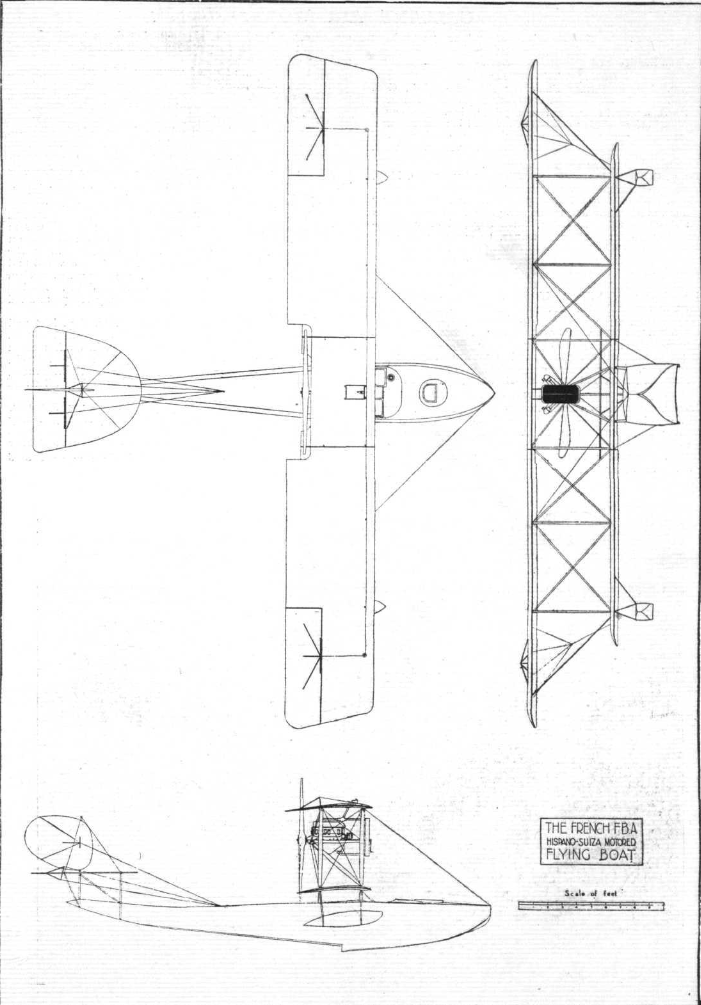

Belgium

- Belgian Air Force - Five aircraft

Estonia

- Estonian Air Force - One aircraft

France

- French Navy

Kingdom of Italy

- Corpo Aeronautico Militare 962 aircraft

Peru

- Peruvian Air Force - Three aircraft

Serbia

- Serbian Air Force and Air Defence - Three aircraft

Spain

- Spanish Air Force

United Kingdom

- Royal Naval Air Service - Four aircraft

United States

- United States Navy

Uruguay

- Uruguayan Air Force - One aircraft

Kingdom of Yugoslavia

- Yugoslav Royal Navy

== Specifications (Hispano 8A) ==
Data from French aircraft of the First World War

General characteristics

- Crew: Three, pilot and two observers/gunners
- Length: 9.92 m (32 ft 7 in)
- Wingspan: 14.12 m (46 ft 4 in)
- Height: 3.1 m (10 ft 2 in)
- Wing area: 40 m^{2} (430 sq ft)
- Empty weight: 984 kg (2,169 lb)
- Gross weight: 1,420 kg (3,131 lb)
- Powerplant: 1 × Hispano-Suiza 8A V-8 water-cooled piston engine, 110 kW (150 hp)
- Propellers: 2-bladed Wooden fixed-pitch pusher propeller

Performance

- Maximum speed: 150 km/h (93 mph, 81 kn)
- Range: 450 km (280 mi, 240 nmi)
- Service ceiling: 4,900 m (16,100 ft)

Armament

- Guns: 1 × 7.7 mm (0.303 in) Lewis gun fixed to fuselage, or mounted on post in nose cockpit
- Bombs: 200 kg (440 lb) of bombs

== See also ==
Related development

- FBA Type A

Aircraft of comparable role, configuration, and era

- Donnet-Denhaut flying boat
- Lohner L

Related lists

- List of maritime patrol aircraft
- List of flying boats and floatplanes
- List of World War I Entente aircraft

== Bibliography ==
- Gerdessen, Frederik. "Estonian Air Power 1918 – 1945". Air Enthusiast, No. 18, April – July 1982. pp. 61–76. ISSN 0143-5450.
- Isaic, Vladimir (August 1994). "Les hydravions FBA-H en Yugoslavie" [Yugoslav FBA-H Flying Boats]. Avions: Toute l'aéronautique et son histoire (in French) (18): 10–11. ISSN 1243-8650.
