= FBA Type A =

French WW1 reconnaissance aircraft

FBA Type A, B, and C
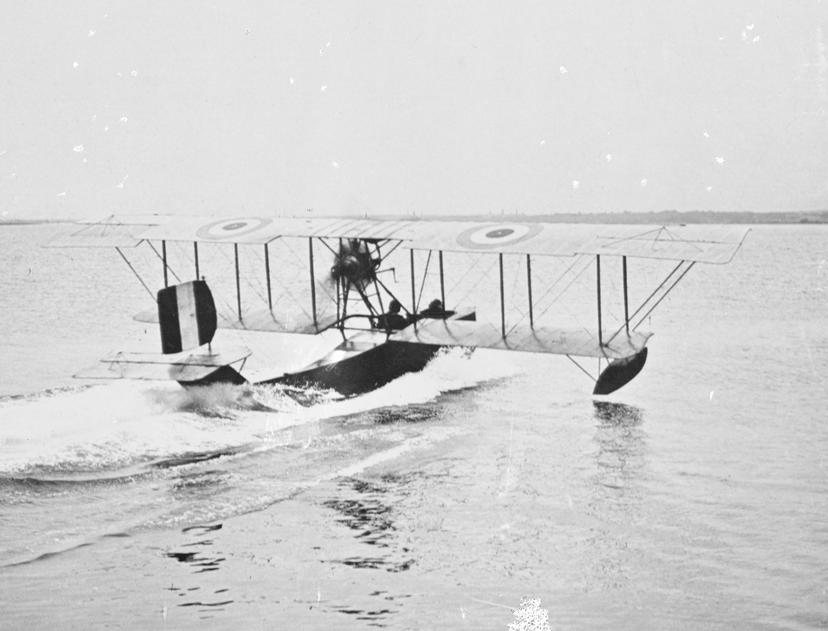

General information
- Type: Reconnaissance flying boat
- Manufacturer: FBA
- Status: Retired
- Primary users: France Aéronautique Maritime Royal Naval Air Service
- Number built: ca. 250

History
- Introduction date: 1913
- First flight: 1913
- Developed into: FBA Type H

The FBA Type A and the similar Type B and C were a family of reconnaissance flying boats produced in France prior to and during World War I.

== Development ==
All three were unequal-span pusher biplane flying boats with a single step hull with ash longerons covered in laminated plywood, divided by bulkheads into eight compartments. The empennage was carried on an upswept curved extension of the hull made from steel tubing. The pilot and observer sat side by side in the open cockpit.

The design originated with patents by Donnet-Lévêque and initially reflected the general configuration of that company's aircraft. The Type A had a single-bay wing, while the larger Type B and C had two bay wings which otherwise only differed in the engine installed, with the type B using a 75 kW (100 hp) Gnome Monosoupape and the type C using a 97 kW (130 hp) Clerget 9B. The RNAS contracted for 20 type B's from Norman Thompson, who was responsible for building flying surfaces for hulls provided from France, which differed most noticeably by having a rectangular all-flying rudder in place of the D-shaped rudder used on French examples. The Type A was the only version with a fin attached to the rudder although some aircraft had a field modification with a fin being added between the hull and the tailplane. The Type H was developed from the Type C but was larger, had a new hull that wasn't attached directly to the tailplane, had an oval rudder and used a Hispano-Suiza 8 stationary engine.

== Operational history ==
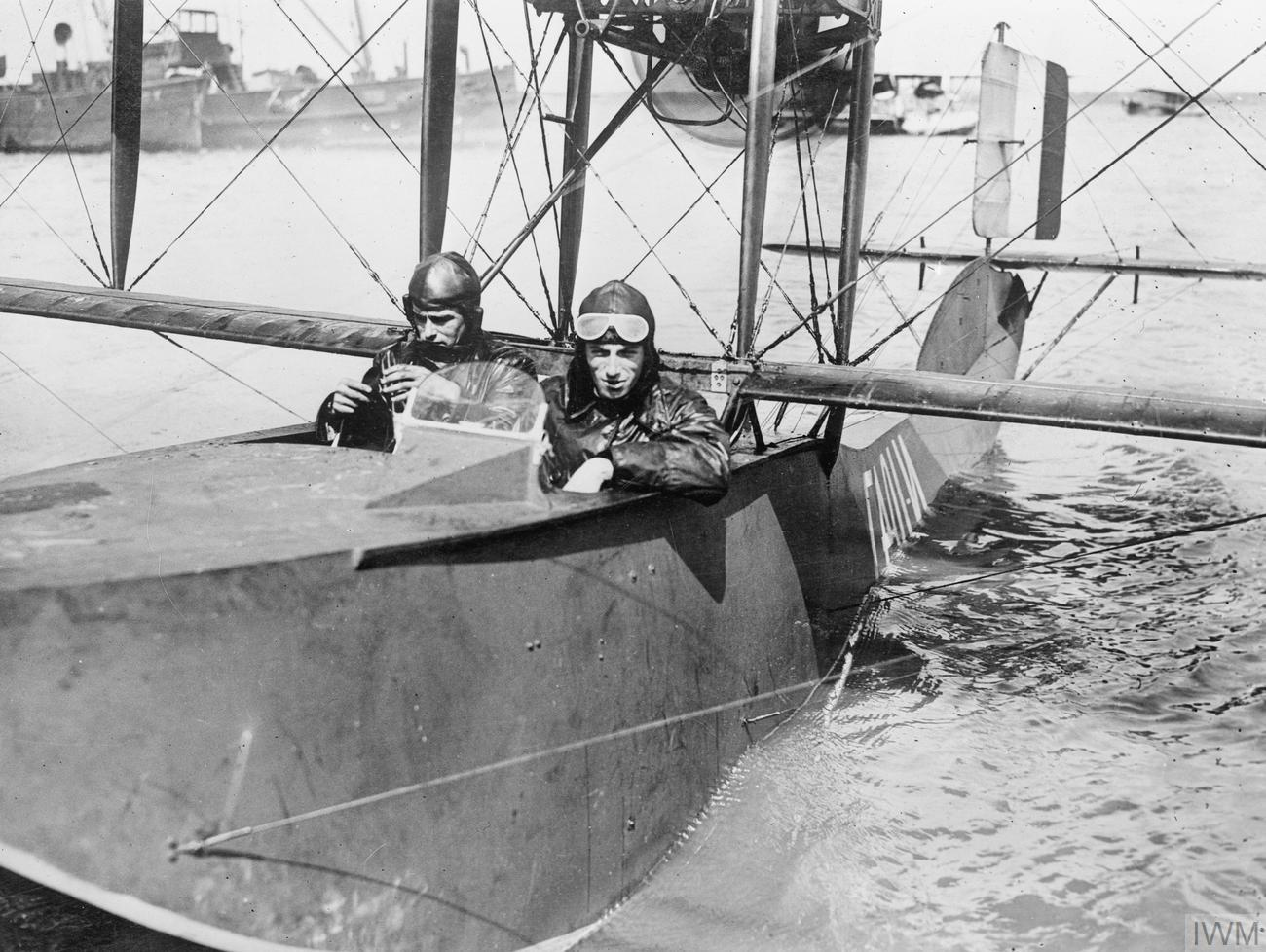
RNAS FBA Type B, which used British-built flying surfaces with a French-built hull

The earliest examples sold entered service with the Austro-Hungarian Navy and Danish Navy prior to World War I, but large-scale use began with sales to the Royal Naval Air Service (RNAS) who initially ordered 20 Type B's from Norman-Thompson before receiving additional Type Cs from France. The French Aéronautique Maritime and Italian Regia Marina (Royal Navy) followed with orders for Type Bs and Cs in 1915. The FBA flying boats were used for naval patrols and frequently encountered their opposing German and Austro-Hungarian Navy counterparts which led to some being converted to single seaters armed with a machine gun. Three Type Bs were the first aircraft operated by the Portuguese Navy.

== Variants ==
Type A
(1913) - powered by a 37 kW (50 hp) Gnome Omega, initial aircraft from 1913.
Type A
(production) - powered by a 60 kW (80 hp) Gnome Monosoupape 7 Type A, enlarged production aircraft.
Type B
powered by a 75 kW (100 hp) Gnome Monosoupape 9 Type B-2. Over 150 built. The 20 Norman-Thompson built Type B for the RNAS had different flying surfaces.
Type C
powered by a 97 kW (130 hp) Clerget 9B. 78 built.
Type 11 HE.2
two-seat flying-boat.
Type 14 HE.2
Two-seat training flying-boat for the French Navy. 20 built.
FBA 100ch
French Navy nomenclature for the Type B
FBA 130ch
French Navy nomenclature for the Type C

== Operators ==
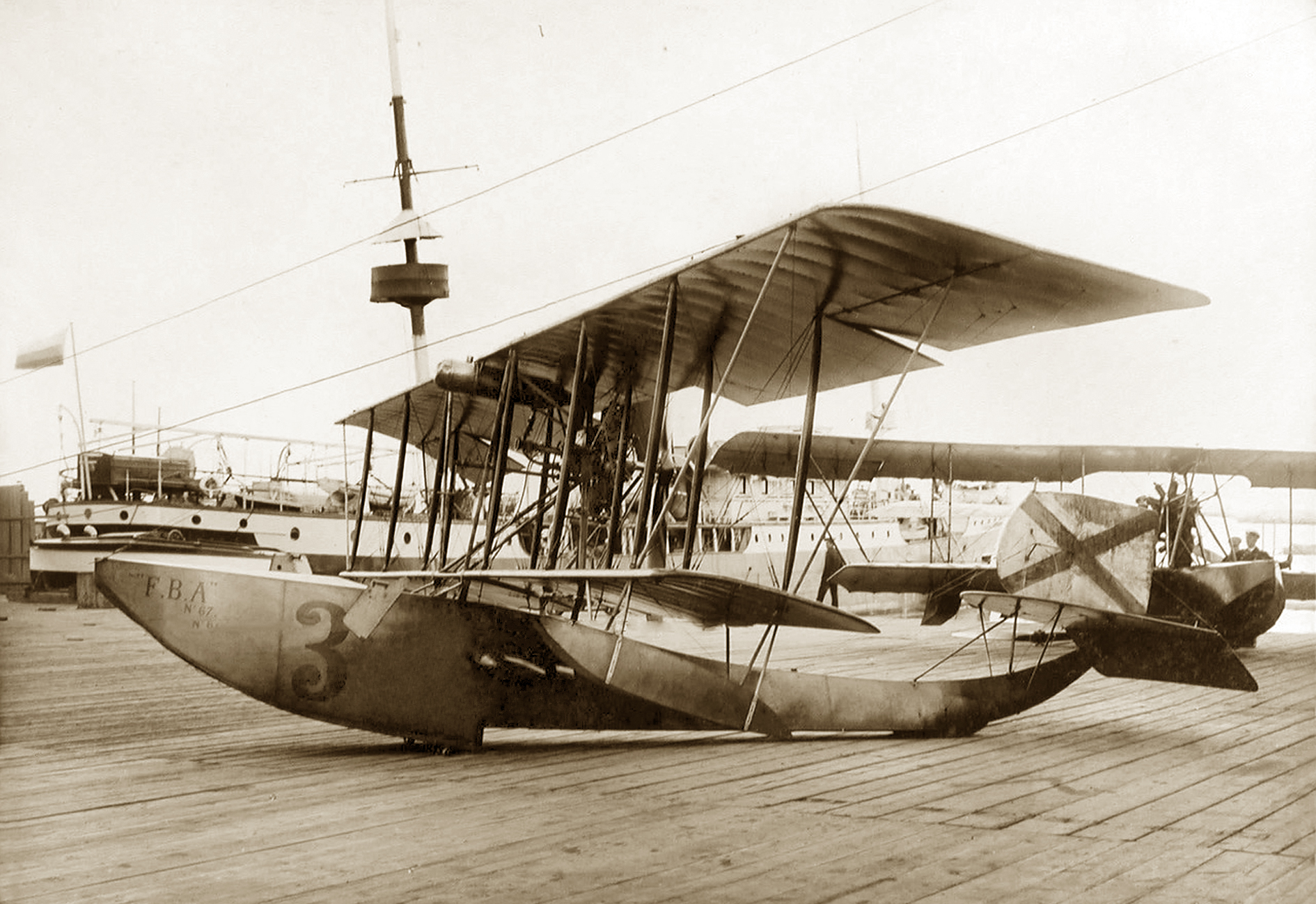
Beached Imperial Russian Navy FBA Type C

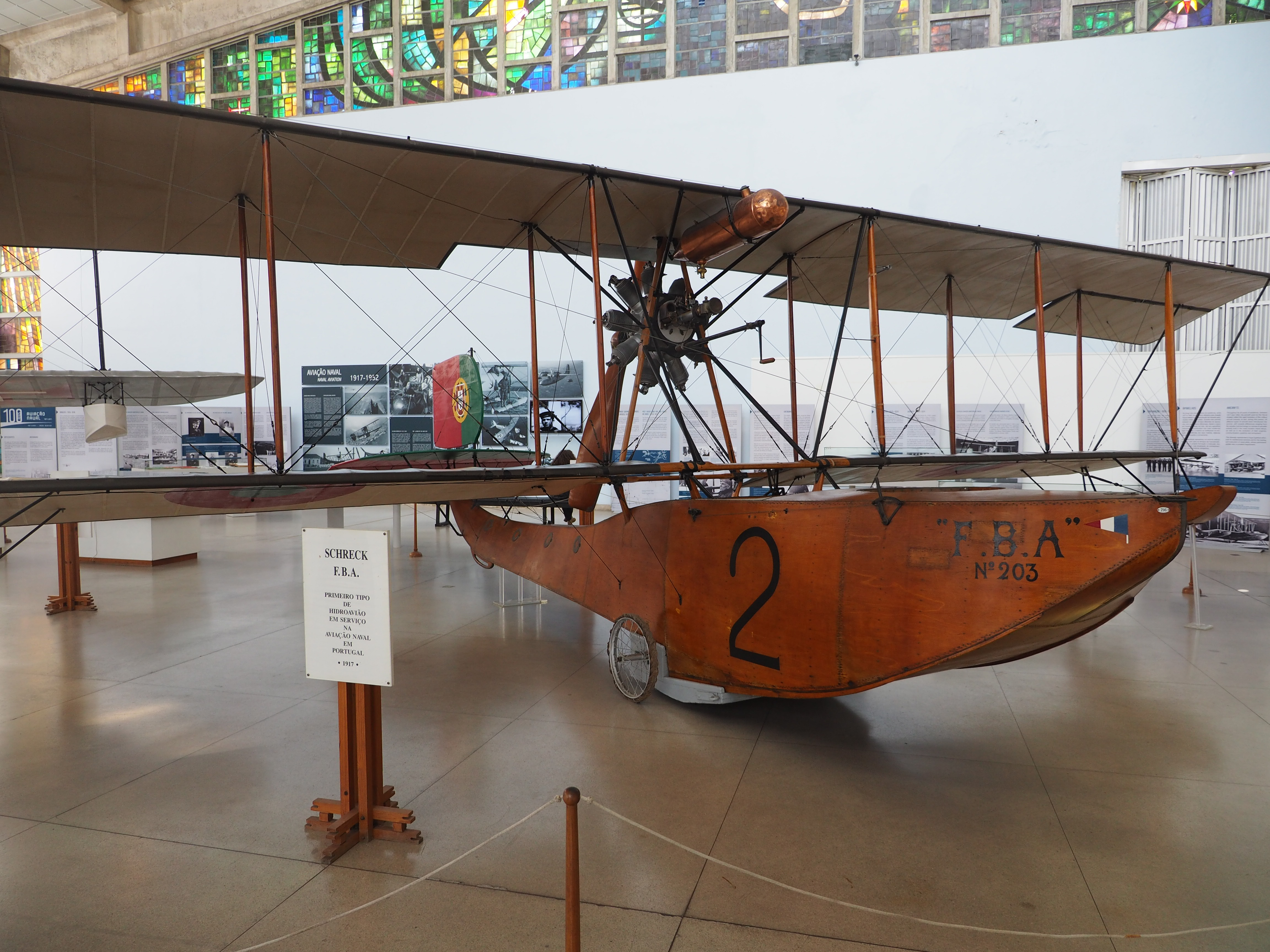
Former Portuguese Navy FBA Type B, at the Maritime Museum, Lisbon

Austria-Hungary

- Kaiserliche und Königliche Kriegsmarine

Brazil

- Brazilian Naval Aviation - Two Type B aircraft.

Denmark

- Danish Navy

France

- Aéronautique Maritime

Italy

- Italian Navy

Portugal

- Portuguese Naval Aviation - Three Type B aircraft.

Russia

- Imperial Russian Air Service
- Imperial Russian Navy

United Kingdom

- Royal Naval Air Service - 116 aircraft including 20 Type B aircraft.
- Gosport Aircraft and Engineering Company

== Survivor ==
A single example of a type B survives in the Museu de Marinha in Lisbon. This aircraft was reassembled from parts from the Portuguese Navy's first two aircraft.

== Specifications (Type C) ==
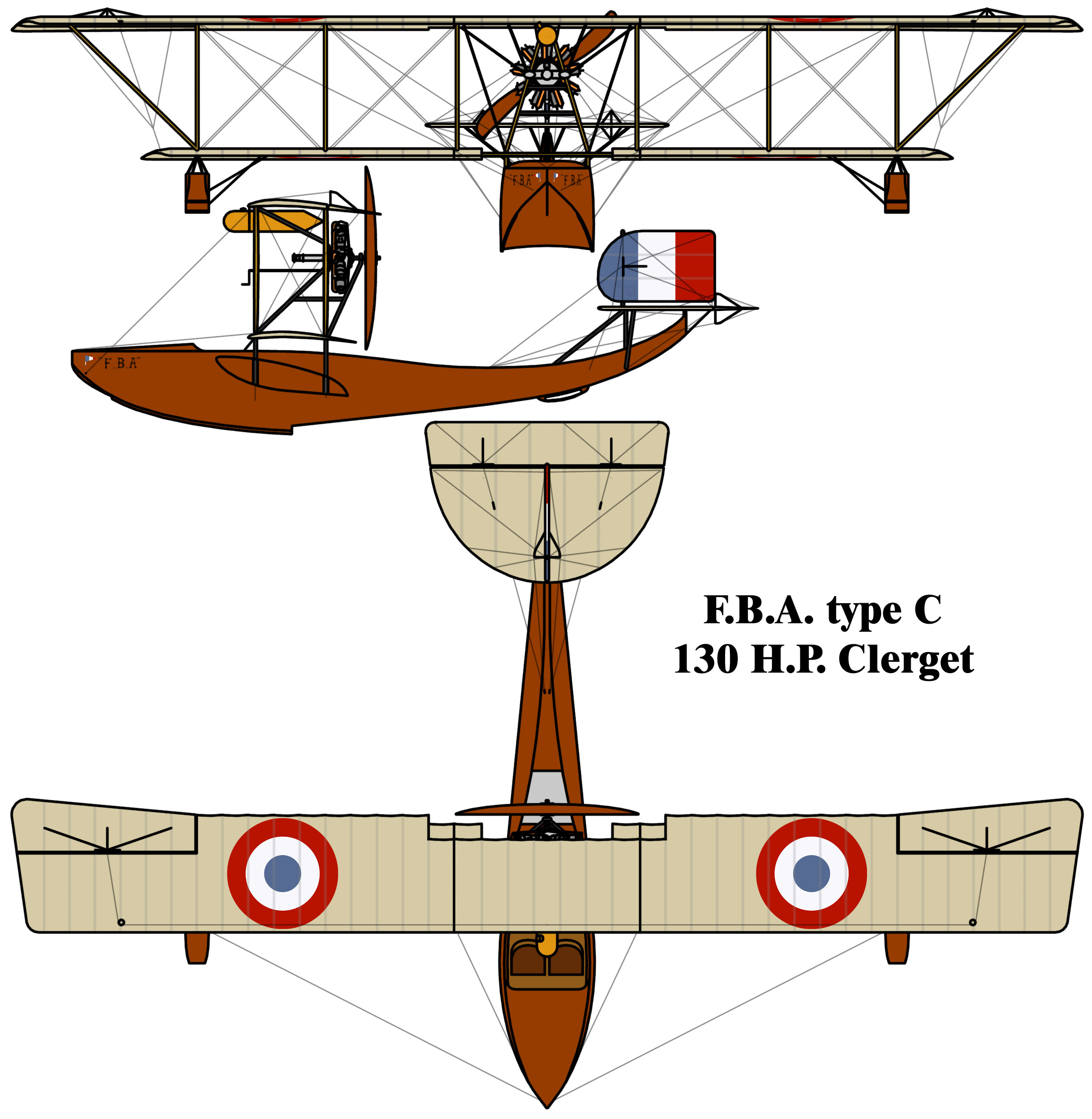
FBA Type C drawing

Data from French aircraft of the First World War, and The Rand McNally encyclopedia of military aircraft, 1914-1980

General characteristics

- Crew: Two, pilot and observer
- Length: 9.14 m (30 ft 0 in)
- Wingspan: 13.71 m (45 ft 0 in)
- Height: 3.05 m (10 ft 0 in)
- Wing area: 32 m^{2} (340 sq ft)
- Empty weight: 640 kg (1,411 lb)
- Gross weight: 907 kg (2,000 lb)
- Powerplant: 1 × Clerget 9B 9-cylinder air-cooled rotary piston engine, 97 kW (130 hp)
- Propellers: 2-bladed fixed-pitch pusher propeller

Performance

- Maximum speed: 110 km/h (68 mph, 59 kn)
- Range: 320 km (200 mi, 170 nmi)
- Endurance: 2.75 hours
- Time to altitude: 2,000 m (6,600 ft) in 25 minutes

Armament

- Guns: 1 x 7.7 mm (0.30 in) machine-gun
- Bombs: 2 x 11 kg (24 lb) bombs
