= FBA 17 =

1920s French training flying boat

Type 17
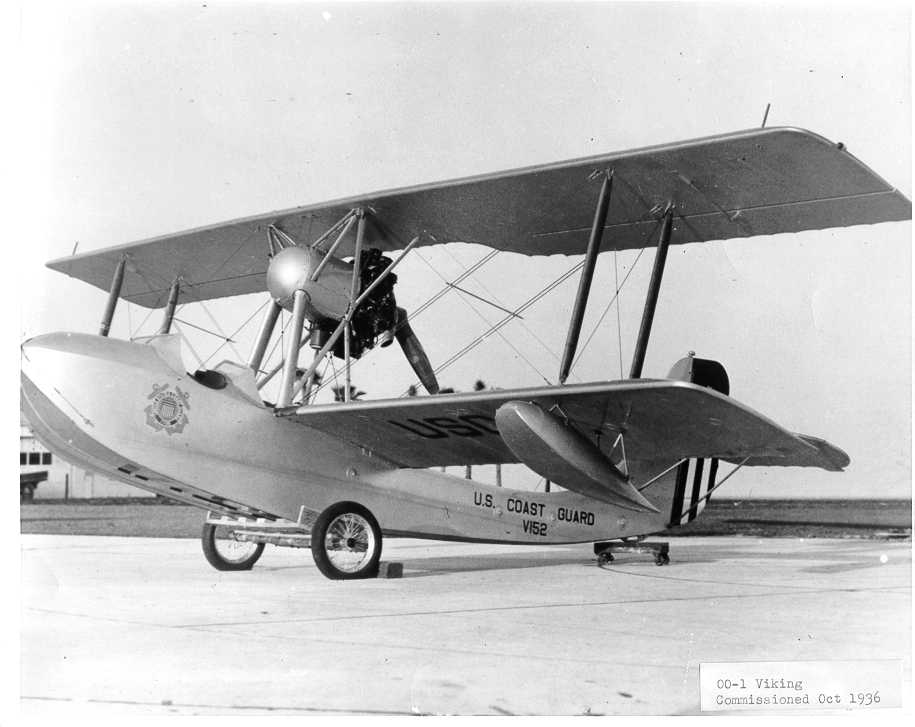
- Viking OO-1 in USCG service

General information
- Type: Flying boat trainer
- Manufacturer: FBA
- Designer: Louis Schreck
- Number built: >300

History
- First flight: April 1923

The FBA 17 was a training flying boat produced in France in the 1920s.

== Design and development ==
Similar in general layout to the aircraft that FBA had produced during World War I, the Type 17 was a conventional two-bay biplane with unequal-span, unstaggered wings and side-by-side open cockpits. The pusher engine was mounted on struts in the interplane gap. Apart from their use by the French Navy, a small number were sold to the Polish Navy, the Brazilian Air Force, and civil operators as well. Some versions were built as amphibians, and others had fittings to allow them to be catapulted from warships.

In 1931, the US Coast Guard purchased an example for evaluation, and being pleased with the design, arranged for the type to be built under licence by the Viking Flying Boat Company in New Haven, Connecticut. Six aircraft were eventually produced and served with the Coast Guard under the designation OO until the outbreak of World War II.

== Variants ==
17 HE.2
(Hydravion d'École) two-seat trainer, Hispano-Suiza 8A-powered, (over 300 built).
17 HL.1
(Hydravion de Liaison) one-seat catapultable liaison aircraft, Hispano-Suiza 8A-powered, (one built)
17 HL.2
Two-seat catapultable liaison aircraft, Hispano-Suiza 8A-powered, (10 built)
17 HMT.2

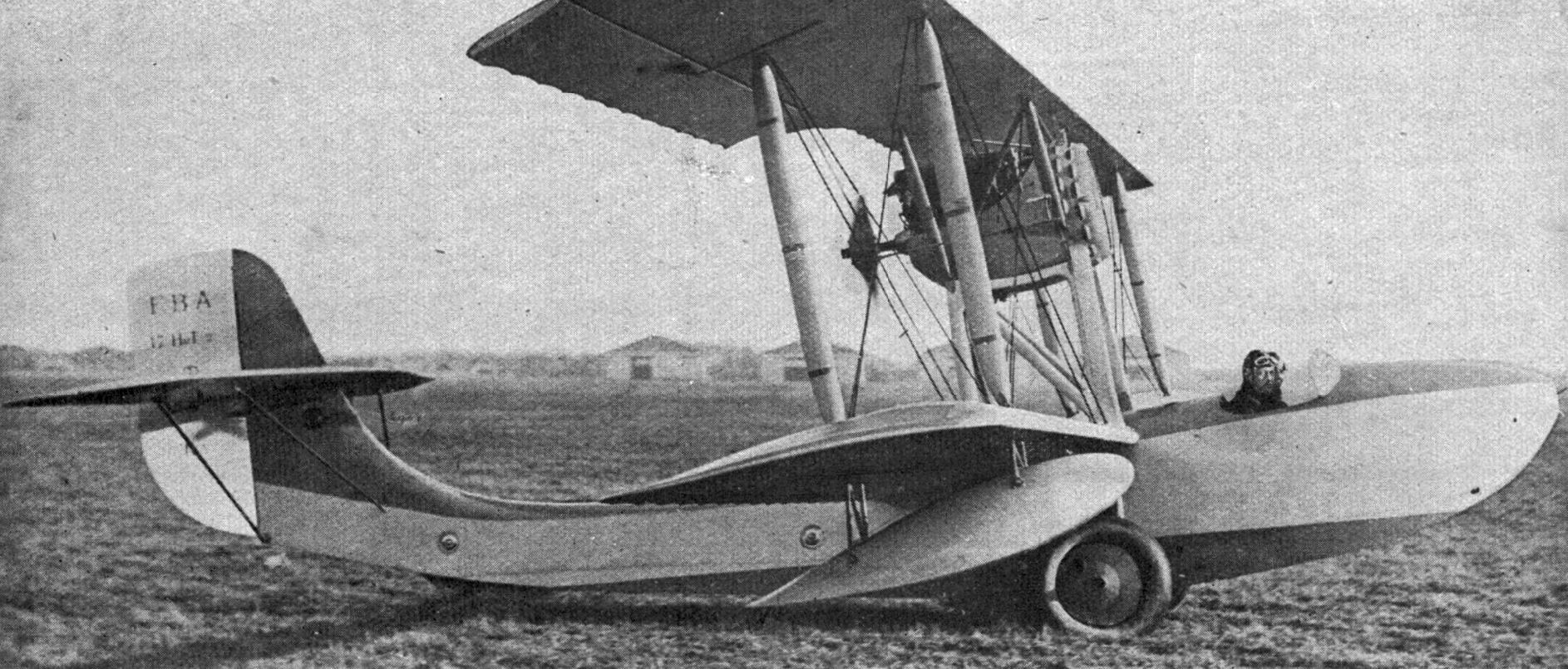
FBA 17 HMT.2 photo from L'Aéronautique December,1926

(Hydravion Mixte de Transport) two-seat amphibious transport aircraft, Hispano-Suiza 8A-powered, (37 built)
A FBA-17HMT2 plane called Lubliniak was bought by the Airborne and Antigas Defence League (LOPP) with funds donated by the readers of Głos Lubelski, for use in propaganda flights across central and eastern Poland.
17 HMB.2
17 HMT 2s already in service with the French Navy, were redesignated HMB 2, after being fitted with a bomb rack on the port side of the hull.
17 HMT.4
Four-seat amphibious transport aircraft, Hispano-Suiza 8A-powered, (two built)
17 HT.4
(Hydravion de Transport) Four-seat transport aircraft, Hispano-Suiza 8A-powered, (35 built)
171 HE.2
Two-seat trainer, Lorraine Mizar-powered, (one built).
172 HE.2
Two-seat trainer, Gnome et Rhône 5B-powered, (five built).
172 HMT.2
Two-seat amphibious transport aircraft, Gnome et Rhône 5B-powered, (one built).
172 HT.4
Four-seat transport aircraft, Gnome et Rhône 5B-powered, (one built).
172/2
The HT.4 was redesignated Type 172/2, Gnome et Rhône 5B-powered, after it was fitted with extra fuel tanks.
Viking V-2
French-built HT.4s converted to two-seaters (four converted)
Viking OO-1
longer-span, Wright R-760-powered version of V-2 produced for USCG (five built)

== Operators ==
Brazil

- Brazilian Air Force
- Brazilian Naval Aviation

France

- French Navy

Poland

- Polish Navy

United States

- United States Coast Guard

== Specifications (17 HE.2) ==
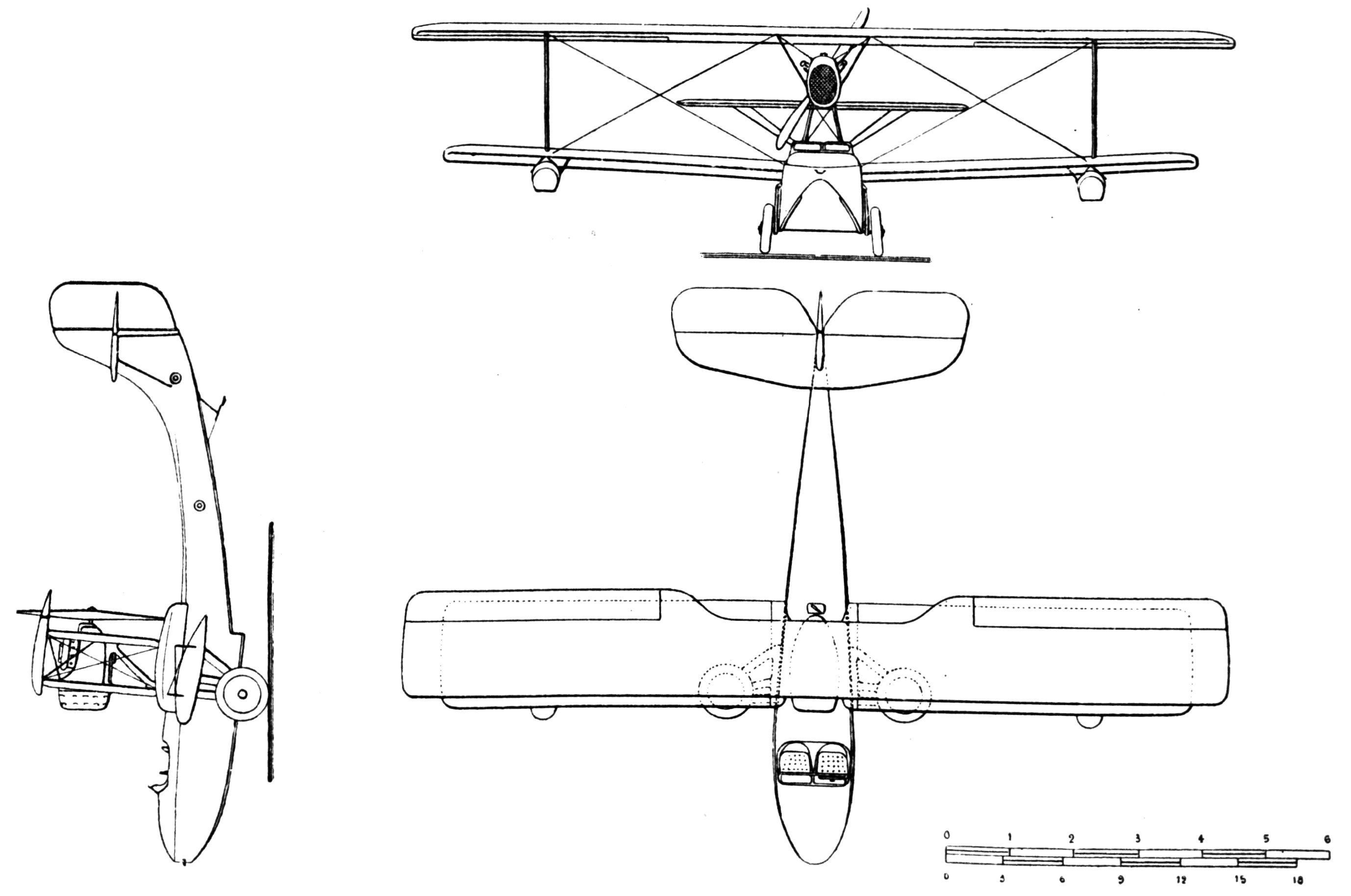
FBA 17 HMT.2 3-view drawing from L'Aéronautique July,1926

Data from Jane's all the World's Aircraft 1928, Aviafrance:F.B.A. 17 HE.2

General characteristics

- Crew: 2
- Length: 8.94 m (29 ft 4 in)
- Wingspan: 12.87 m (42 ft 3 in)
- Height: 3.2 m (10 ft 6 in)
- Wing area: 36.5 m^{2} (393 sq ft)
- Empty weight: 850 kg (1,874 lb)
- Gross weight: 1,150 kg (2,535 lb)

Performance

- Maximum speed: 162 km/h (101 mph, 87 kn)
- Landing speed: 80 km/h (50 mph; 43 kn)
- Range: 360 km (220 mi, 190 nmi)
- Service ceiling: 5,000 m (16,000 ft)
- Time to altitude: 2,000 m (6,600 ft) in 9 minutes; 3,000 m (9,800 ft) in 17 minutes 30 seconds
- Wing loading: 31.5 kg/m^{2} (6.5 lb/sq ft)
- Power/mass: 0.1166 kW/kg (0.0709 hp/lb)

== See also ==
Related lists

- List of Interwar military aircraft
