= FBA 10 =

1920s French aircraft

General information
- Type: Reconnaissance flying boat
- Manufacturer: FBA
- Number built: 2

History
- First flight: November 1922

The FBA 10 was a reconnaissance flying boat built in France in the early 1920s.

== Development ==
The FBA 10 was a two-seat biplane flying boat of all-wood construction.

== Specifications ==
Data from

General characteristics

- Crew: 2, pilot and observer
- Length: 12.60 m (41 ft 4 in)
- Wingspan: 17.50 m (57 ft 5 in)
- Height: 4.20 m (13 ft 9 in)
- Wing area: 76.00 m^{2} (818.1 sq ft)
- Empty weight: 2,400 kg (5,291 lb)
- Gross weight: 3,200 kg (7,055 lb)
- Powerplant: 1 × Darracq 12Da V-12 water-cooled piston engine, 310 kW (420 hp)
- Propellers: 2-bladed fixed-pitch pusher propeller

Performance

- Maximum speed: 150 km/h (93 mph, 81 kn)
- Service ceiling: 3,500 m (11,500 ft)
