= FBA 13 =

1920s French aircraft

General information
- Type: Reconnaissance flying boat
- Manufacturer: Franco-British Aviation
- Number built: 1

History
- First flight: 1923

The FBA 13 was a 1920s French training flying boat of all-wood construction.

== Design and Development ==
The FBA 13 was a single-engine, two-seat biplane flying boat intended as a trainer aircraft. It had a wooden hull with a single-step bottom to help the aircraft break free from the water during takeoff and equal-span biplane wings that connected by parallel struts and wire bracing.

It was developed and built by Franco-British Aviation in 1922 with side stabilizing floats mounted beneath the lower wings to keep the aircraft upright while taxiing on water, Two open cockpits arranged in tandem, with the instructor typically seated behind the student, and a conventional tail with a fin, rudder, and horizontal stabilizer mounted at the rear of the hull. However, only one prototype was introduced.

== Specifications ==
Data from

General characteristics

- Crew: 2, pilot and observer
- Length: 9.10 m (29 ft 10 in)
- Wingspan: 13.80 m (45 ft 3 in)
- Wing area: 33.00 m^{2} (355.2 sq ft)
- Empty weight: 980 kg (2,161 lb)
- Gross weight: 1,250 kg (2,756 lb)
- Powerplant: 1 × Hispano-Suiza 8Aa V-8 water-cooled piston engine, 110 kW (150 hp)
- Propellers: 2-bladed fixed-pitch pusher propeller

Performance

- Maximum speed: 135 km/h (84 mph, 73 kn)
- Range: 350 km (220 mi, 190 nmi)
- Service ceiling: 3,200 m (10,500 ft)
