= Potez X =

1920s French transport aircraft

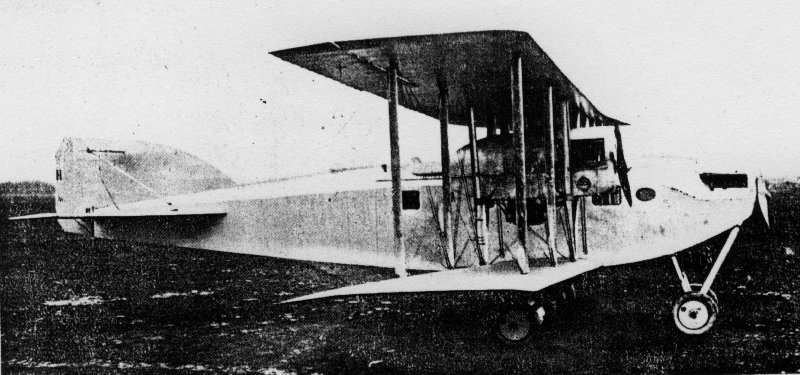

General information
- Type: General purpose colonial transport aircraft
- National origin: France
- Manufacturer: Potez

History
- First flight: 1922
- Variants: Potez XVIII; Potez XXII

The Potez X was a French 1920s general-purpose colonial transport aircraft designed and built by Potez.

== Development ==
The Potez X was a three-engined biplane with a fixed nosewheel landing gear supplemented with a tailskid. The first variant was the Potez X A which was powered by three 140 hp (104 kW) Hispano-Suiza 8Aa piston engines, two strut-mounted between the upper and lower wings and one nose-mounted. It had an enclosed cabin for 10 passengers with the pilot in an open cockpit behind the cabin. Later the engines were changed to more powerful Hispano-Suiza 8Ab versions. Two other variants were built with 280 hp (209 kW) Hispano-Suiza 8Bec engines, the X B was a military variant and the X C a commercial variant.

The Potez X formed the basis of two similar airliners in the Potez XVIII and Potez XXII.

== Variants ==
XA
Original commercial variant with three 100 kW (140 hp) Hispano-Suiza 8Aa piston engines.
XB
Military variant with 220 kW (300 hp) Hispano-Suiza 8Fb engines.
XC
Civil variant with 210 kW (280 hp) Hispano-Suiza 8Bec engines.

== Specifications (Potez X A) ==
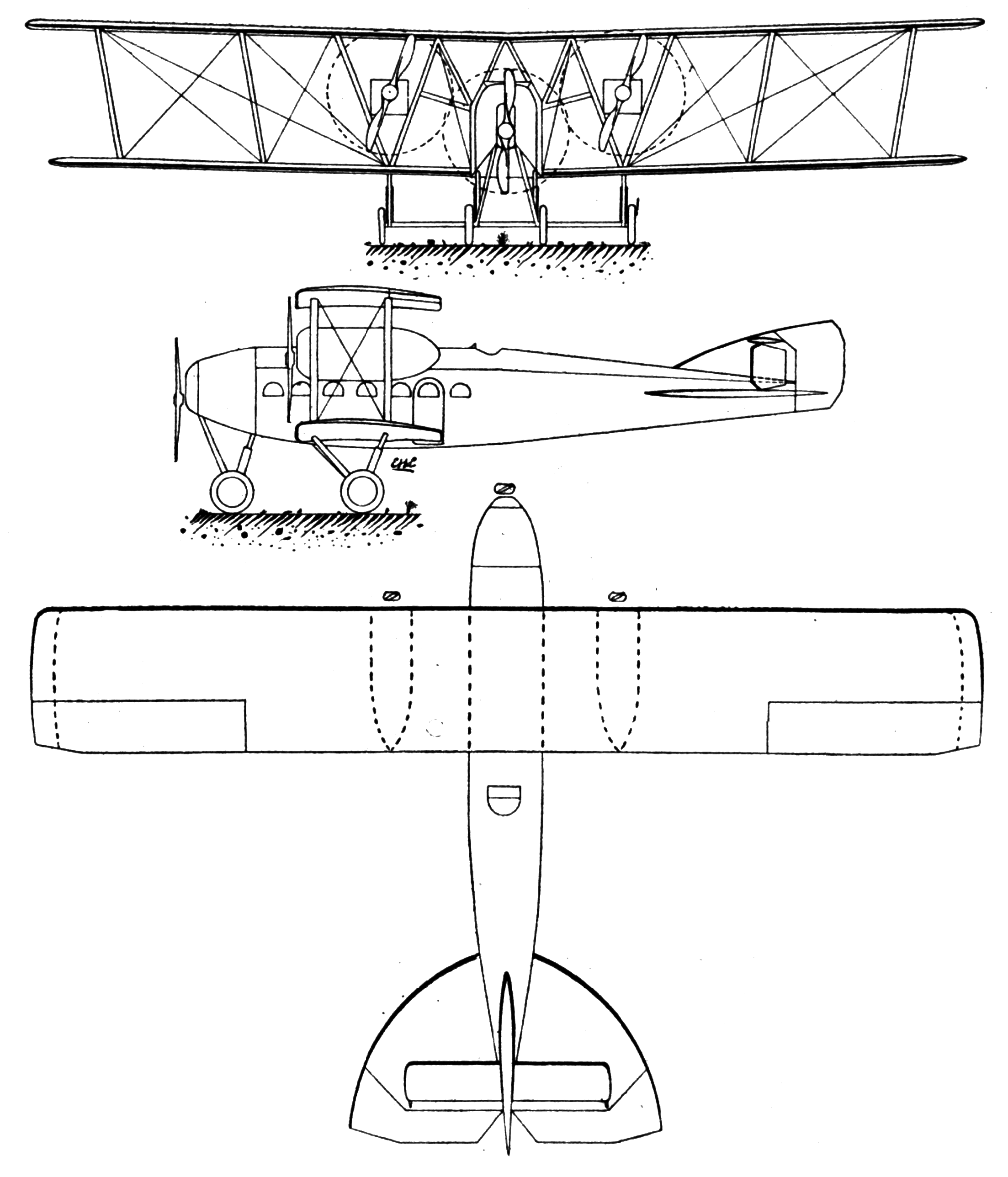
Potez X 3-view drawing from Les Ailes July 7, 1921

General characteristics

- Crew: 1
- Capacity: 10 passengers
- Length: 12.95 m (42 ft 6 in)
- Wingspan: 18.40 m (60 ft 4 in)
- Height: 4.15 m (13 ft 7 in)
- Wing area: 94 m^{2} (1,010 sq ft)
- Empty weight: 1,800 kg (3,968 lb)
- Gross weight: 3,090 kg (6,812 lb)
- Powerplant: 3 × Hispano-Suiza 8Ab , 130 kW (180 hp) each

Performance

- Maximum speed: 165 km/h (103 mph, 89 kn)
- Cruise speed: 132 km/h (82 mph, 71 kn)
- Range: 1,000 km (620 mi, 540 nmi)
- Service ceiling: 5,500 m (18,000 ft)
