= FBA 19 =

Flying boat bomber developed in France

Type 19
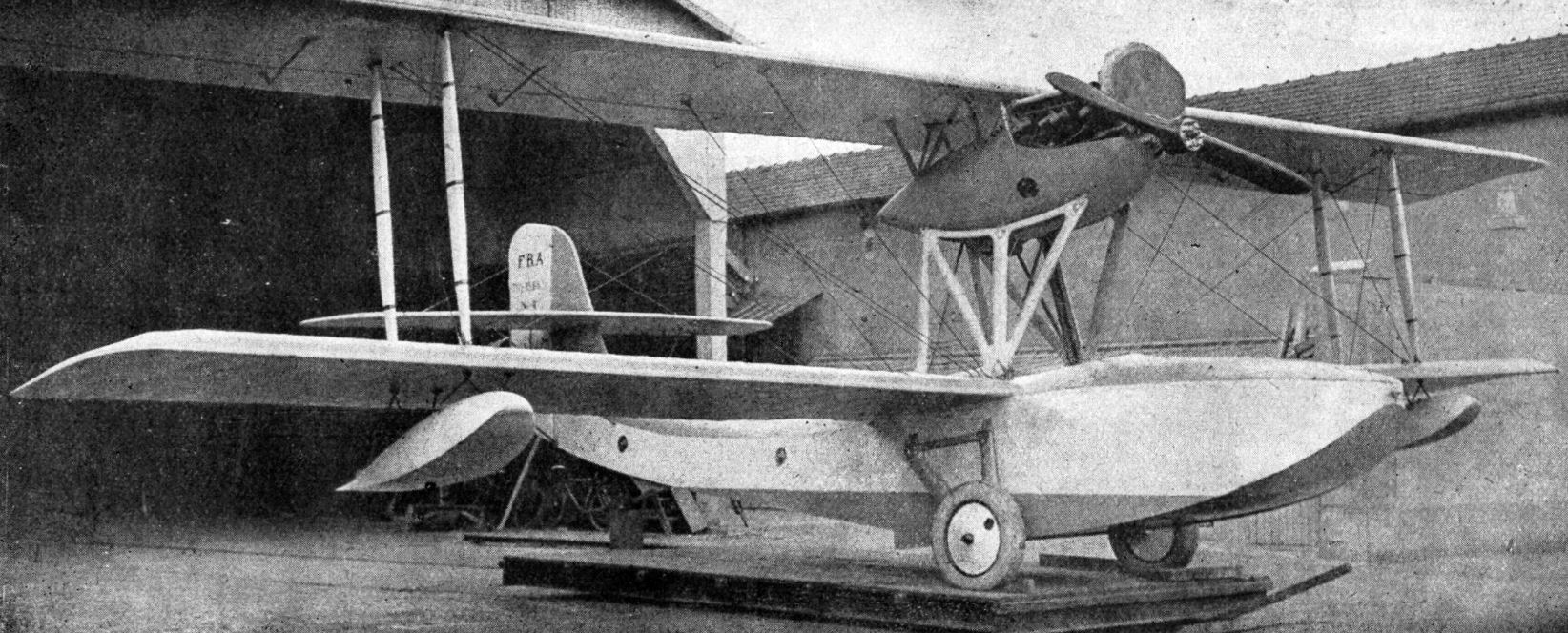

General information
- Type: Flying boat bomber
- Manufacturer: FBA
- Number built: 10

History
- First flight: 24 August 1924

The FBA 19 was a flying boat bomber developed in France in 1924 by Franco-British Aviation.

== Design ==
Similar in configuration to FBA's wartime designs, it was a conventional biplane flying boat with open cockpits for the three crewmembers. Unlike the firm's earlier designs, however, the engine was mounted tractor-fashion in a streamlined nacelle mounted in the interplane gap.

== Operational history ==
The prototype set a world altitude record for its class with a 500 kg (1,102 lb) payload, but despite this performance, the French Navy did not order it, either in its original form or when it was offered as an amphibian. Another version was built as a commercial transport, but the only example built was sold to Air Union.

== Variants ==
FBA 19 HB.2
(Hydravion de Bombardement) - 2-seat reconnaissance bomber; 9 built.
FBA 19 HMB.2
(Hydravion Mixte de Bombardement) - 2-seat amphibian reconnaissance bomber.
FBA 19 HMT.3
(Hydravion Mixte de Transport) - 3-seat amphibian transport; 1 built.

== Operators ==
France

- Air Union

Republic of China

- Nationalist Chinese Navy

== Specifications (HB.2) ==
Data from Jane's all the World's Aircraft 1928, Aviafrance:FBA19

General characteristics

- Crew: 2
- Length: 9.45 m (31 ft 0 in)
- Wingspan: 14.4 m (47 ft 3 in)
- Height: 3.8 m (12 ft 6 in)
- Wing area: 45.7 m^{2} (492 sq ft)
- Empty weight: 1,350 kg (2,976 lb)
- Gross weight: 1,920 kg (4,233 lb)
- Powerplant: 1 × Hispano-Suiza 8Fb V-8 water-cooled piston engine, 220 kW (300 hp)
- Propellers: 2-bladed fixed-pitch propeller

Performance

- Maximum speed: 175 km/h (109 mph, 94 kn)
- Range: 400 km (250 mi, 220 nmi)
- Service ceiling: 6,000 m (20,000 ft)
- Time to altitude: 2,000 m (6,600 ft) in 10 minutes 25 seconds
- Wing loading: 42 kg/m^{2} (8.6 lb/sq ft)
- Power/mass: 0.13699 kW/kg (0.08333 hp/lb)

== See also ==
Related lists

- List of Interwar military aircraft
