= FBA 16 =

1920s French aircraft

FBA 16 HE2
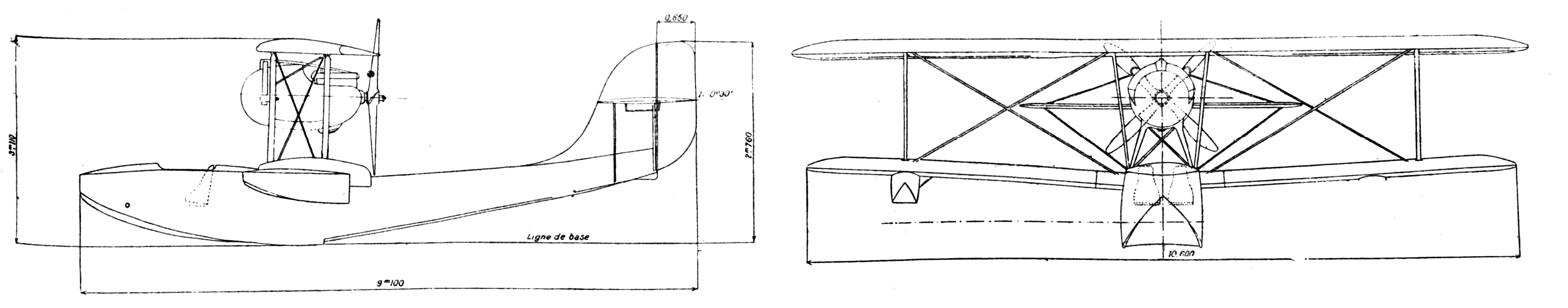

General information
- Type: Reconnaissance flying boat
- Manufacturer: FBA
- Number built: 1

History
- First flight: 1923

The FBA 16 HE2, (HE2 - Hydravion d'entrainement 2 sieges - flying boat trainer 2-seat), was a flying boat trainer built in France in the early 1920s.

== Development ==
The FBA 16 HE2 was a two-seat biplane flying boat of all-wood construction.

== Specifications ==
Data from Aviafrance : FBA 16 HE2

General characteristics

- Crew: 2, pilot and observer
- Length: 9.10 m (29 ft 10 in)
- Wingspan: 11.00 m (36 ft 1 in)
- Height: 3.11 m (10 ft 2 in)
- Wing area: 34.00 m^{2} (366.0 sq ft)
- Empty weight: 1,020 kg (2,249 lb)
- Gross weight: 1,290 kg (2,844 lb)
- Powerplant: 1 × Hispano-Suiza 8Aa V-8 water-cooled piston engine, 110 kW (150 hp)
- Propellers: 2-bladed fixed-pitch pusher propeller

Performance

- Maximum speed: 140 km/h (87 mph, 76 kn)
- Range: 360 km (220 mi, 190 nmi)
- Service ceiling: 3,000 m (9,800 ft)
