= Potez XVIII =

1920s French airliner

General information
- Type: Three-engine, twelve-seat biplane airliner
- National origin: France
- Manufacturer: Henry Potez
- Number built: 1

History
- First flight: 5 December 1922
- Developed from: Potez X

The Potez XVIII was a French airliner from the early 1920s, a three-engine biplane carrying up to twelve passengers.

== Design and development ==
The Potez XVIII airliner, displayed at the 1922 Paris Salon, was a development of the Potez X colonial transport. It was an unequal span biplane largely built of wood, though with metal engines mountings and other fittings, engine nacelles and tail surfaces. The rectangular plan wings were fabric covered. On each side, towards the wing tips a parallel pair of interplane struts leaned outwards. Closer to the fuselage a parallel pair of V-form interplane struts formed a cradle for the outboard engines, mounted between the wings. These, and the third in the nose, were Lorraine 8Bds, water-cooled V-8 engines, each producing 201 kW (270 hp); cooled by cylindrical radiators hung beneath each engine nacelle. Ailerons with aerodynamic balances extending past the wing-tips were fitted on the lower wing only.

The flat-sided and -bottomed fuselage had curved upper decking, dropping towards the tail. Behind the engine cowling back to the rear of the passenger compartment the fuselage was plywood-covered, with fabric covering aft. Pilot and engineer/navigator/radio operator sat side by side in an open cockpit ahead of the upper wing, with an internal door to the passenger cabin. Each passenger had a window, and there was a central passageway between the seats leading to a toilet and luggage compartment at the rear. The empennage was conventional, with the tailplane mounted on the upper fuselage longerons. The fin and rudder together were of broad chord, the rudder balanced. The Potez XVIII had a conventional undercarriage with two pairs of underwing mainwheels and a tail skid. Each pair was mounted on two V-form struts with aerofoil section, duralumin forward legs and rear telescopic, shock absorbing legs.

Only one Potez XVIII was built. After its first flight on 5 December 1922, the flight test programme continued into the spring of 1924. It was bought by the French government but never put into production.

== Potez XXII ==
The Potez XVIII was developed into the very similar Potez XXII, which differed chiefly in having more powerful, uncowled 283 kW (380 hp) Bristol Jupiter radial engines. It also had an extended nose, increasing the length by 1,300 mm (51.2 in) and an increased maximum weight of 5,400 kg (11,900 lb). The lower-wing, balanced ailerons were replaced with unbalanced ailerons on both upper and lower wings. The type XXII competed in Le Grand Prix des Avions de Transport (Transport Aircraft Prize Competition), held in the autumn of 1923, though without distinction.

== Specifications ==
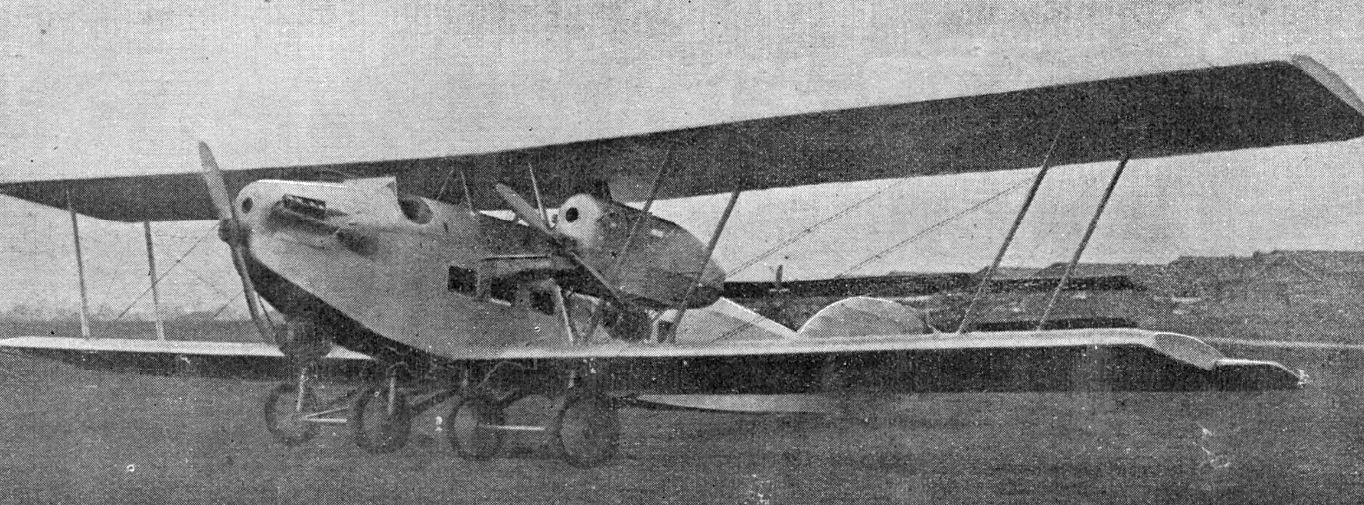
Potez XVIII photo from L'Aéronautique December,1922

Data from Flight 25 January 1923, p.49-50

General characteristics

- Crew: 2
- Capacity: maximum 12
- Length: 14.8 m (48 ft 7 in)
- Wingspan: 22 m (72 ft 2 in)
- Height: 4.0 m (13 ft 1 in)
- Wing area: 112 m^{2} (1,210 sq ft)
- Empty weight: 2,900 kg (6,393 lb)
- Gross weight: 4,775 kg (10,527 lb)
- Fuel capacity: 675 kg (1,488 lb)
- Powerplant: 3 × Lorraine 8Bd water-cooled V-8 piston engines, 200 kW (270 hp) each
- Propellers: 2-bladed

Performance

- Maximum speed: 195 km/h (121 mph, 105 kn) at sea level
- Endurance: 4 hr
- Service ceiling: 5,000 m (16,000 ft)
