= Dewoitine P-2 =

Single-seat French glider, 1922

General information
- Type: Sailplane
- National origin: France
- Manufacturer: Constructions Aéronautiques Émile Dewoitine
- Designer: Émile Dewoitine
- Number built: 1

History
- First flight: 14 August 1922

The Dewoitine P-2 was a glider built by Dewoitine in the early 1920s.

== Specifications (variant specified) ==
Data from Aviafrance : Dewoitine P-2

General characteristics

- Crew: one
- Length: 5.21 m (17 ft 1 in)
- Wingspan: 11.28 m (37 ft 0 in)
- Wing area: 15 m^{2} (160 sq ft)
- Empty weight: 110 kg (243 lb)
- Gross weight: 180 kg (397 lb)
