= List of aircraft (0–Ah) =

This is a list of aircraft in numerical order of manufacturer beginning with a digit, followed by alphabetical order beginning with numeral '0' through 'Ah'.

== 3 ==
=== EADS 3 Sigma ===
- EADS 3 Sigma Nearchos

=== 3I ===
see Iniziative Industriali Italiane

- 3I Sky Arrow

=== 3Xtrim Aircraft Factory ===
- 3Xtrim 3X47 Ultra
- 3Xtrim 3X55 Trener
- 3Xtrim Navigator

== 7 ==
=== 76th Fighter Squadron Inc ===
(Meadow Lake Airport, CO)

- Rowley P-40F

== A ==
=== A2 Czech Ltd ===
(Czech Republic)

- A2 CZ Ellipse Spirit

=== A41 Factory ===
(Aircraft Repairing Company A-41)

- A41 Factory VNS-41

=== AA ===
(Arsenalul Aeronautic, Romania - see Arsenalul Aeronautic)

- AA Aeron

=== A.I.R.'s ===
- A.I.R.'s Maestro (Yakolev Yak-28U)
- A.I.R.'s Allegro

=== A-B Helicopters ===
- A-B Helicopters A/W 95

=== A-I-R GmbH ===
(Halblech, Germany)

- A-I-R Atos

=== AA & E ===
(Australian Aircraft & Engineering / N.B. Love, W.J. Warneford and H.E. Broadsmith)

- AA & E Commercial B1

=== AAA ===
(Advanced Amphibious Aircraft)

- AAA

=== AAA ===
(American Affordable Aircraft)

- AAA Vision

=== AAC ===
(Australian Aircraft Consortium pty.)

- AAC A10 Wamira
- AAC A20

=== AAC ===
(Angel Aircraft Corporation.)

- AAC Angel

=== AAC ===
(Amphibian Airplanes of Canada)

- AAC SeaStar
- AAC Seastar Sealoon

=== Aachener ===
(Aachener Segelflugzeugbau GmbH)

- Aachener K.F.

=== AAI ===
(American Aircraft International)

- AAI Penetrator

=== AAI ===
(American Autogyro Inc)

- AAI Sparrowhawk
- AAI Spinus

=== AAI ===
(see NorthropGrumman)

- AAI RQ-2 Pioneer
- AAI RQ-7 Shadow
- AAI Aerosonde
- AAI Shadow 200
- AAI Shadow 400
- AAI Shadow 600

=== AAI ===
(American Aviation Industries)

- AAI FanStar

=== AAMSA ===
(Aeronáutica Agrícola Mexicana SA)

- AAMSA A9B-M Quail (Rockwell International Quail Commander)
- AAMSA Sparrow

=== AASI ===
(Advanced Aerodynamics and Structures Inc., Burbank, CA)

- AASI Jetcruzer 450
- AASI Jetcruzer 500
- AASI Jetcruzer 650
- AASI Stratocruzer 1250
- AASI ML-1
- AASI ML-2
- AASI ML-4
- AASI ML-5

=== Abaris ===
- Abaris Golden Arrow

=== Abbott ===
(John L Abbott, Detroit, MI)

- Abbott Midwing

=== Abbott-Baynes Sailplanes Ltd ===
- Abbott-Baynes Scud 1
- Abbott-Baynes Scud 2
- Abbott-Baynes Scud 3
- Carden-Baynes Auxiliary
- Baynes Cantilever Pou - variant of Mignet HM.14 "Flying Flea"
- Baynes Bat
- Carden-Baynes Bee
- Abbott-Baynes replica Antoinette monoplane
- Baynes Heliplane

=== ABC Motors ===
- ABC Robin

=== Abe ===
(Keiichi Abe)

- Abe Midget
- Abe Mizet II

=== ABHCO ===
(Arab British Helicopter Company)

- ABHCO Gazelle

=== Abraham ===
(Edmond Abraham)

- Abraham Iris
- Abraham AS-2 Iris II

=== Abraham ===
(Lewis Abraham, Portsmouth, VA)

- Abraham Z-1-X

=== Abramovich ===
- Abramovich Flyer

=== Abrams ===
(Abrams Air Craft Corp, 606 E Shiawassee St, Lansing, MI)

- Abrams P-1 Explorer

=== Abreu ===
(Aeronautical Engineering Co, Oakland, CA)

- Abreu AE-5

=== Abrial ===
- Levasseur-Abrial A-1
- Abrial A-2 Vautour
- Abrial A-3 Oricou
- Peyret-Abrial A-5 Rapace
- Abrial A-8
- Abrial A-12 Bagoas
- Abrial A-13 Buse
- Abrial A-260

=== Abric-Calas ===
- Abric-Calas biplane
- Abric-Calas biplane glider

=== ABS Aerolight ===
(Sérignan-du-Comtat, France)

- ABS Aerolight ATE
- ABS Aerolight Legacy
- ABS Aerolight Navigathor

=== ABS Aircraft ===
- ABS Aircraft RF-9

=== Absolut-Marine ===
- Absolut-Marine Seaplane

=== AC Millennium ===
(AC Millennium Corp, Edmonton, Alberta, Canada)

- ARV Griffin

=== AC Mobil 34 ===
- AC Mobil 34 Chrysalin

=== ACA ===
( ACA Industries)

- ACA JW-1Development of NASA AD-1
- ACA JW-2Development of NASA AD-1
- ACA JW-3Development of NASA AD-1

=== ACAZ ===
(Ateliers de Construction Aéronautique de Zeebruges)

- ACAZ C.2
- ACAZ T.1
- ACAZ T.2

=== ACBA ===
(Aéro Club du Bas Armagnac)

- ACBA-4
- ACBA-7 Midour
- ACBA-8 Midour 2
- ACBA Midour 3
- ACBA BM.101

=== Ace Aviation ===
(Kalhatti, Ooty, Tamil Nadu, India)

- Ace Magic

=== Ace ===
(Aircraft Engineering Corp, 535 E 79 St, New York, NY)

- Ace K-1

=== Ace ===
(Ace Aircraft Mfg Co (Edwin T Jacobs),)

- Baby Ace Model D
- Baby Ace Model E Junior Ace

=== ACE ===
(Essig Aero Advertising Service, Los Angeles, CA)

- A C E 1928 monoplane

=== Ace ===
(Ace Aircraft Mfg Co, Asheville, NC)

- Ace Model D Baby Ace
- Ace Model E Junior Ace
- Ace Scooter

=== Aceair ===
- Aceair Aeriks

=== Aces High ===
- Aces High Cuby

=== ACHDB ===
(Alekseyev Central Hydrofoil Design Bureau)

- ACHDB А-080-752
- ACHDB Spasatel
- ACHDB А-300-538
- ACHDB A-90 Orlyonok
- ACHDB Lun-class ekranoplan
- ACHDB Utka

=== Acier ===
- Acier monoplane

=== ACLA ===
(Aero Consult Light Aircraft)

- AC Sirocco NG

=== Acme ===
see Sierradyne

=== Acme ===
(Acme Aircraft Corporation, Loves Park, Rockford, IL)

- Acme 1928 Biplane
- Acme Model 21 Sportsman

=== Acme ===
(Acme Aircraft Co, Torrance, CA)

- Acme Centaur 101
- Acme Centaur 102
- Acme Sierra S-1 Sportplane Sierra Sue

=== ACME ===
(Air Craft Marine Engineering Co)

- ACME Anser Amphibian

=== Acro ===
(Acro Sport Inc, Hales Corners, WI)

- Acro Sport II
- Super Acro Sport

=== Acrolite Aircraft ===
(Kakabeka Falls, Ontario, Canada)

- Acrolite 1A
- Acrolite 1B
- Acrolite 1C
- Acrolite 1M
- Acrolite 1T
- Acrolite 2M

=== ACS-Itaipu ===
(ACS Aviation - Itaipu Binacional)

- ACS-Itaipu Sora-E

=== ACS ===
(Advanced Composites Solutions)

- ACS-100 Sora

=== Activian ===
- Santa Ana VM-1

=== AD ===
(Admiralty Air Department)

- AD Flying Boat
- AD Navyplane
- AD Scout (AD Sparrow)
- AD Seaplane Type 1000

=== AD & D ===
(Aero-Design & Development, Israel)

- AD & D Hummingbird

=== AD Aerospace ===
- AD Aerospace T-211

=== ADA ===
(Aeronautical Development Agency India)

- ADA AMCA

=== Adam ===
(Designer:Roger Adam, France; Avianautic)

- Adam RA-10
- Adam RA-10S
- Adam RA-14 Loisirs
- Adam RA-15 Major
- Adam RA-17

=== Adam ===
(Adam Aircraft Industries, Denver, CO)

- Adam M-309 CarbonAero
- Adam A500
- Adam A700 AdamJet

=== Adamoli-Cattani ===
- Adamoli-Cattani fighter

=== Adams ===
(J. Adams, Staten Island, NY)

- Adams B-4

=== Adams ===
(see Thorp)

=== Adams-Toman ===
(Adams-Toman Aircraft Co, Aberdeen, WA)

- ATA Cruiser

=== Adams-Wilson ===
(see Hobbycopter)

- Adams-Wilson Hobbycopter (1955)

=== Adaridi ===
- Adaridi AD 3

=== Adaro ===
- Adaro 1.E.7 Chirta

=== ADC ===
(Aircraft Disposal Company / Airdisco) see:Airdisco

=== Adcox ===
(Adcox Aviation Trades School (Aircraft Builders Corp), Portland, OR)

- Adcox 1-A
- Adcox Cloud Buster
- Adcox Special
- Adcox Student Prince

=== Addems ===
(Walter J Addems, Loda, IL)

- Addems-Nieuport 11 Replica

=== Ader ===
- Ader Éole (Avion I)
- Ader Avion II
- Ader Avion III
- Ader Avion IV (unfinished)

=== ADI ===
(Aircraft Designs Inc., Monterey, CA)

- ADI Condor
- ADI Stallion
- ADI Sportster
- ADI Bumble Bee

=== Adkins ===
(Cliff AdkinsParkston SD.)

- Adkins 1973 Monoplane
- Adkins Midwing

=== Adkisson ===
(Earl and Jerry Adkisson, John Canfield, Lincoln, NE)

- Adkisson SJ-1 Head Skinner

=== Advance ===
(Advance Aircraft Co)

- Advance 1923 Biplane

=== Advance Thun SA ===
(Thun, Switzerland)

- Advance Alpha
- Advance Bi Beta
- Advance Epsilon
- Advance Iota
- Advance Omega
- Advance Pi
- Advance Sigma

=== Advanced Aeromarine ===
- Advanced Aeromarine Buccaneer
- Advanced Aeromarine Carrera
- Advanced Aeromarine Mallard
- Advanced Aeromarine Sierra

=== Advanced Aircraft ===
(Advanced Aircraft Corporation)

- Advanced Aircraft Turbine P-210 (Turbo-powered Cessna 210)
- Advanced Aircraft Regent 1500

=== Advanced Aviation ===
- Advanced Aviation Cobra
- Advanced Aviation Explorer
- Advanced Aviation King Cobra
- Advanced Aviation Zephyr
- Advanced Aviation Husky
- Advanced Aviation Toucan
- Advanced Aviation Barracuda
- Advanced Aviation Hi-Nuski
- Advanced Aviation Coyote

=== Advanced Soaring Concepts ===
- Advanced Soaring Concepts Falcon
- Advanced Soaring Concepts Spirit
- Advanced Soaring Concepts Apex

=== Adventure Air ===
- Adventure Air Adventurer 2+2
- Adventure Air Adventurer 333
- Adventure Air Heavy Hauler

=== Adventure Aircraft ===
- Adventure Aircraft EMG-6

=== Adventure SA ===
(Méré, Yonne, France)

- Adventure A series
- Adventure F series
- Adventure R series
- Adventure S series
- Adventure Wheely II

=== Ae. ===
(from Dirección General de Aerotécnica (1927–1936))

- Ae. C.1
- Ae. C.2
- Ae. C.3
- Ae. C.3G
- Ae. C.4
- Ae. M.B.1 Bombi
- Ae. M.E.1
- Ae. M.O.1
- Ae. M.Oe.1
- Ae. M.Oe.2
- Ae. M.S.1
- Ae. T.1

=== AEA ===
(Aerial Experimental Association)

- AEA Red Wing ("Aerodrome #1")
- AEA White Wing ("Aerodrome #2")
- AEA June Bug ("Aerodrome #3")
- AEA Loon ("Aerodrome #3-A")
- AEA Silver Dart ("Aerodrome #4")
- AEA Cygnet ("Aerodrome #5")

=== AEA ===
(Aeronautical Engineers Australia Research Pty Ltd)

- AEA Explorer 350R
- AEA Explorer 500T (turboprop)
- AEA Explorer 500R (turboprop)
- AEA Maverick

=== AEC ===
(Aircraft Engineering Corp. 535 E 79 St, New York, NY)

- AEC K-1 Ace

=== AEF Air Lift System ===
(Houllies, France)

- AEF Monotrace

=== AEG ===
Allgemeine Elektrizitäts Gesellschaft (AEG)

- AEG B.I
- AEG B.II
- AEG B.III
- AEG C.I
- AEG C.II
- AEG C.III
- AEG C.IV
- AEG C.IVN
- AEG C.V
- AEG C.VI
- AEG C.VII
- AEG C.VIII
- AEG C.VIII Dr
- AEG D.I
- AEG DJ.I
- AEG Dr.I
- AEG G.I
- AEG G.II
- AEG G.III
- AEG G.IV
- AEG G.V
- AEG J.I
- AEG J.II
- AEG K.I
- AEG N.I
- AEG PE
- AEG R.I
- AEG R.II
- AEG Z.1
- AEG Z.2
- AEG Z.3
- AEG Z.6
- AEG Z.9
- AEG Typ KZ.9
- AEG Wagner Eule
- AEG Helicopter
- AEG Flugboot
- AEG S1

=== AEKKEA-RAAB ===
(Anonymos Etaireia Kataskevis Kai Ekmetallefseos Aeroplanon - Societe Anonyme Pour la Fabrication et l'Exploitation des Avions Raab)

- AEKKEA-Raab R-29

=== Aer Lualdi ===
See also: Lualdi-Tassotti

- Lualdi-Tassotti ES 53
- Aer Lualdi L.55
- Aer Lualdi L.57
- Aer Lualdi L.59

=== Aer Pegaso ===
See also: CVT

- Aer Pegaso M 100S

=== Aerauto ===
- Aerauto PL.5C

=== AEREON ===
- AEREON Dynairship
- AEREON VectoRotor
- AEREON WASP
- AEREON III
- AEREON 26

=== Aerfer ===
(Industrie Meccaniche Aeronautiche Meridionali-Aerfer)

See also: Ambrosini, Aeritalia

- Aerfer Ariete
- Aerfer Leone
- Aerfer Sagittario 2

=== Aerial Distributors ===
(Aerial Distributors Inc, Wichita, KS)

- Aerial Distributors Distributor Wing
- Aerial Distributors DWI-1 Distributor Wing

=== Aerial Service ===
- Aerial Service Mercury Senior

=== Aerial Transport ===
(Aerial Transport Corp, New York, NY)

- V.B.L.-1 (C D Air Express)

=== Aerial Wheel Syndicate ===
- Aerial Wheel Syndicate Monoplane

=== Aériane ===
- Aériane Sirocco
- Aériane SWIFT
  - Aériane Tandem SWIFT
  - Aériane SWIFT-PAS
  - Aériane P-SWIFT
  - Aériane SWIFT'Lite

=== Aerion ===
- Aerion SBJ
- Aerion AS2
- Aerion AS3

=== Aeris Naviter ===
- Aeris Naviter AN-2 Enara

=== Aeritalia ===
See also: Fiat, Alenia, AMX International, Aerfer

- Aeritalia AM.3
- Aeritalia G.91
- Aeritalia G.222

=== Aermacchi ===
See also: Macchi, AMX International

- Aermacchi AM.3
- Aermacchi AL-60 (Aermacchi-Lockheed/Lockheed Azcarate LASA 60/Lockheed 60)
- Aermacchi S-211
- Aermacchi SF.260
- Aermacchi M-290 RediGO
- Aermacchi M-311
- Aermacchi MB-326
- Aermacchi MB-335
- Aermacchi MB-338
- Aermacchi MB-339
- Aermacchi MB-340
- Aermacchi M-346
- AERMACCHI/DASA PTS-2000

=== Aermas ===
(Automobiles Martini SA)

- Aermas 386

=== Aernova ===
- Aernova AER-1

=== Aero (Yugoslavia) ===
see Ikarus

=== Aero ===
(Aero Tovàrna Letadel / Aero Vodochody Národní Podnik / "Aero Vodochody National Corporation")

- Aero Ae 01
- Aero Ae 02
- Aero Ae 03
- Aero Ae 04
- Aero Ae 10
- Aero A.1
- Aero A.8
- Aero A.10
- Aero A.11
- Aero A.12
- Aero A.14
- Aero A.15
- Aero A.17
- Aero A.18
- Aero A.19
- Aero A.20
- Aero A.21
- Aero A.22
- Aero A.23
- Aero A.24
- Aero A.25
- Aero A.26
- Aero A.27
- Aero A.29
- Aero A.30
- Aero A.32
- Aero A.34
- Aero A.35
- Aero A.38
- Aero A.42
- Aero A.46
- Aero A.100
- Aero A.101
- Aero A.102
- Aero A.104
- Aero A.125
- Aero A.130
- Aero A.134
- Aero A.200
- Aero A.204
- Aero A.230
- Aero A.300
- Aero A.304
- Aero A.330
- Aero A.430
- Aero Ae 50
- Aero Ae 270 Ibis
- Aero C-3A
- Aero C-3B
- Aero C-4
- Aero C-103
- Aero C-104
- Aero D-44
- Aero Z-35 Heli Trainer
- Aero F-10 Raptor
- Aero HC-2 Heli Baby
- Aero HC-3
- Aero HC-4
- Aero HC-102 Heli Baby
- Aero HC-202
- Aero LC-II
- Aero L-29 Delfin
- Aero L-39 Albatros
- Aero L-139 Albatros
- Aero L-59 Super Albatros
- Aero L-159 ALCA
- Aero L-60 Brigadyr
- Aero L-160 Brigadyr
- Aero MB.200
- Aero XE-I
- Aero XE-II
- Aero XE-IIA
- Aero XE-IIB
- Aero XE-IIC
- Aero XE-IIE
- Aero XE-IIF
- Aero 45
- Aero 145

=== Aero ===
(Aero Sp.z o.o.)

- Aero AT-1
- Aero AT-2
- Aero AT-3
- Aero AT-4

=== Aero & Tech ===
(Fossato Di Vico, Italy)

- Aero & Tech Nexth

=== Aero Adventure Aviation ===
- Aero Adventure Aventura
- Aero Adventure Aventura II
- Aero Adventure Aventura II XLR
- Aero Adventure Aventura HP
- Aero Adventure Aventura UL
- Aero Adventure Barracuda
- Aero Adventure KP 2U-Sova
- Aero Adventure Toucan
- Aero Adventure Pegasus

=== Aero Boero ===
- Aero Boero 260AG
- Aero Boero AB-95
- Aero Boero AB-115
- Aero Boero AB-150
- Aero Boero AB-180
- Aero Boero AB-210
- Aero Boero AB-260
- Aero Boero Tomahawk SP

=== Aero Bravo ===
- Aero Bravo Bravo 700
- Aero Bravo Bravo 700 Agricola
- Aero Bravo Sky Ranger

=== Aero Car ===
(Joseph L Halsmer, Lafayette, IN)

- Aero Car 1959 Monoplane (Model 1)?
- Aero Car two seater (Model 2)?
- Aero Car Model 3

=== Aero Commander ===
(prev. Aero Design & Engr Corp, Culver City, CA, later Aero Commander division of Rockwell)

- Aero Commander 100
- Aero Commander 200
- Aero Commander 500
- Ag Commander
- Darter Commander
- Jet Commander
- Lark Commander
- Quail Commander
- Snipe Commander
- Sparrow Commander
- Thrush Commander

=== Aero Composites/Aero Composite Technologies ===
- Aero Composites Sea Hawk
- Aero Composites Sea Hawker

=== Aero Concepts ===
(Aero Concepts LLC, Gainesville, FL)

- Aero Concepts Discovery

=== Aero Design and Engineering Company ===
See also: Aero Commander, Rockwell

- Aero Commander 500 family

=== Aero Design Associates ===
(Aero Design Associates (pres: David Garber), Opa-Locka, FL)

- Aero Design DG-1

=== Aero Designs ===
(Aero Designs Inc, San Antonio, TX)

- Aero Designs Pulsar
- Aero Designs Pulsar XP
- Aero Designs SL-1 Star-Lite

=== Aero Dynamics ===
(Aero Dynamics Ltd, Div of North American Aero Dynamics (Canada), Arlington, WA)

- Aero Dynamics Sparrow Hawk

=== Aero East Europe ===
(Kraljevo, Serbia)

- Aero East Europe Sila

=== Aero Electric ===
(Aero Electric Aircraft Corporation)

- Aero Electric Sun Flyer

=== Aero Eli Servizi ===
(Aero Eli Servizi Costruzioni Aeronautiche)

- Aero Eli Servizi Yo-Yo 222

=== Aero Gare ===
- Aero Gare Sea Hawker

=== Aero Mercantil ===
(Aero Mercantil SA)

- Aero Mercantil EL1 Gavilan

=== Aero Mirage ===
(Aero Mirage Inc, Gainesville, FL)

- Aero Mirage TC-2

=== Aero Nord ===
(Lorgies, and later Bénifontaine, France)

- Aero Nord AIR

=== Aero Products ===
(API/Aeronautical Products Inc)

- Aero Products A-1
- Aero Products A-3

=== Aero Research Limited ===
- De Bruyne Snark
- Ladybird

=== Aero Resources ===
(Aero Resources Inc, Gardena, CA)

- Aero Resources J-2
- Aero Resources Super J-2

=== Aéro Services Guépard ===
- Aéro Services Guépard Guépy
- Aéro Services Guépard Guépard 912
- Aéro Services Guépard Guépe
- Aéro Services Guépard Guépy Club
- Aéro Services Guépard Super Guépard
- Aéro Services Guépard SG10

=== Aero Spacelines ===
(Aero Spacelines Inc, Van Nuys, CA)

- Aero Spacelines Guppy-101
- Aero Spacelines Guppy-201
- Aero Spacelines B-377GT Guppy-Turbine
- Aero Spacelines B-377MG Mini Guppy
- Aero Spacelines B-377MGT Mini Guppy Turbine
- Aero Spacelines B-377PG Pregnant Guppy
- Aero Spacelines B-377SG Super Guppy
- Aero Spacelines B-377SGT Super Guppy Turbine

=== Aero Sport ===
(Aero Sport Aviation Co, 723 Ventura St, Santa Paula, CA)

- Aero Sport S-2 (S-1?)

=== Aero-Sport International ===
- Aero-Sport Kahu

=== Aero Synergie ===
(Aero Synergie SARL, Villefranche-de-Rouergue, France)

- Aero Synergie Jodel D20
- Aero Synergie Joker J300
- Aero Synergie Papango

=== Aero Vodochody ===
- Aero Ae 01
- Aero Ae 02
- Aero Ae 03 1 Single piston engine monoplane reconnaissance airplane
- Aero Ae 04
- Aero A.8 1921 1 Single piston engine biplane airliner
- Aero A.10 1922 5 Single piston engine biplane airliner
- Aero A.11 1925 ~250 Single piston engine biplane light bomber
- Aero A.12 1923 93 Single piston engine biplane light bomber
- Aero A.14 1922 Single piston engine biplane reconnaissance airplane
- Aero A.15 Single piston engine biplane reconnaissance airplane
- Aero DH.50 License built single piston engine biplane airliner[32]
- Aero A.16 Unbuilt biplane bomber
- Aero A.17 Glider
- Aero A.18 1923 20 Single piston engine biplane fighter
- Aero A.19 Single piston engine biplane fighter
- Aero A.20 1923 1 Single piston engine biplane fighter
- Aero A.21 1926 8 Single piston engine biplane trainer
- Aero A.22 3 Single piston engine biplane utility airplane
- Aero A.22 (II) Unbuilt four engine heavy bomber
- Aero A.23 1926 7 Single piston engine biplane airliner
- Aero A.24 1925 1 Twin piston engine biplane bomber
- Aero A.25 15 Single piston engine biplane trainer
- Aero A.26 1923 23 Single piston engine biplane reconnaissance airplane
- Aero A.27 Twin piston engine biplane bomber
- Aero A.27 (II) Unbuilt twin engine airliner
- Aero A.28 Trainer
- Aero A.29 1926 9 Single piston engine biplane reconnaissance floatplane
- Aero A.30 1926 79 Single piston engine biplane light bomber
- Aero A.31 Unbuilt fighter
- Aero A.32 1927 116 Single piston engine biplane light bomber
- Aero A.33 Unbuilt three engine airliner
- Aero A.34 Kos 1929 11 Single piston engine biplane sport airplane
- Aero A.35 1928 12 Single piston engine high-wing monoplane airliner
- Aero A.36 Unbuilt three engine biplane bomber
- Aero A.38 1929 6 Single piston engine biplane airliner
- Aero A.40 Unbuilt racing airplane
- Aero A.42 1929 2 Single piston engine monoplane bomber
- Aero A.44 Unbuilt twin engine bomber
- Aero A.46 1931 1 Single piston engine biplane trainer
- Aero A.48 Unbuilt airliner
- Aero A.49 Unbuilt ultralight
- Aero A.55 Unbuilt ultralight
- Aero A.60 Unbuilt three engine transport airplane
- Aero A.100 1933 44 Single piston engine biplane light bomber
- Aero A.101 1934 50 Single piston engine biplane light bomber
- Aero A.102 1934 2 Single piston engine monoplane fighter
- Aero A.104 1937 2 Single piston engine monoplane bomber
- Aero A.125 12 Single piston engine biplane trainer
- Aero A.130 1 Single piston engine biplane light bomber
- Aero A.134 1 Single piston engine biplane sport airplane
- Aero A.200 1934 2 Single piston engine monoplane sport airplane
- Aero MB.200 1935 74 License built twin piston engine monoplane bomber
- Aero A.202 Unbuilt twin engine airliner
- Aero A.204 1936 1 Twin piston engine monoplane airliner
- Aero A.206 Prototype twin piston engine monoplane bomber
- Aero A.210 Unbuilt four engine airliner
- Aero A.212 Unbuilt utility airplane
- Aero A.230 25 Single piston engine biplane light bomber
- Aero A.300 1938 1 Twin piston engine monoplane bomber
- Aero A.302 Unbuilt attack airplane
- Aero A.304 1937 19 Twin piston engine monoplane bomber
- Aero A.321 Single piston engine biplane light bomber
- Aero A.330 Single piston engine biplane light bomber
- Aero A.351
- Aero A.404 Unbuilt twin piston engine monoplane bomber
- Aero A.430 Single piston engine biplane light bomber
- Aero C-3 License built twin piston engine monoplane trainer
- Aero C-4/C-104 License built single piston engine biplane trainer
- Aero C-103 License built twin piston engine monoplane airliner
- Aero D-44 License built twin piston engine monoplane transport
- Aero Ae-45 1947 200 Twin piston engine monoplane utility airplane
- Aero Ae 50 1949 1 Single piston engine monoplane reconnaissance airplane
- Aero Ae-53 Prototype transport glider
- LB P-1 Unbuilt twin engine trainer
- LB P-16 Unbuilt four engine airliner
- Aero Ae-148 Unbuilt twin engine airliner
- Aero B-34 Unbuilt attack airplane
- Aero HC-2 Heli Baby 1954 23 Single piston engine utility helicopter
- Aero L-60 Brigadýr 1953 273 Single piston engine monoplane utility airplane
- Aero L-260 Single piston engine monoplane utility airplane
- Aero L-29 Delfín 1959 Single jet engine monoplane trainer
- Aero L-229
- Aero L-260
- Aero L-360
- Aero L-429
- Aero S-102
- Aero S-103
- Aero S-104
- Aero S-105
- Aero S-106
- Aero L-39 Albatross
- Aero L-270
- Aero L-59 Super Albatross
- Aero Ae 270 Ibis
- Aero L-159 ALCA
- Aero L-39NG
- Aero F/A-259 Striker

=== Aero-Astra ===
(Aviatsionnyy Nauchno-Yekhnicheskiy Tsentr Aero-Astra (Aero-Astra))

- Aero-Astra Okhotnik 1
- Aero-Astra Okhotnik 2
- Aero-Astra Okhotnik 2M
- Aero-Astra Okhotnik 3

=== Aero-Cam ===
- Aero-Cam Slick 360

=== Aéro-Club de Nice ===
- Aéro-Club de Nice Mistralet

=== Aéro-Club de Surenses ===
- Aéro-Club de Surenses Abeille

=== Aéro-Club des Cheminots ===
- Aero-Club des Cheminots Aerofer

=== Aéro-Club des Métallurgistes ===
- Aéro-Club des Métallurgistes Métalair

=== Aéro-Club du Jura ===
- Aéro-Club du Jura CAP Dolé

=== Aéro-Club du Rhône et du Sud-Est ===
- Aéro-Club du Rhône et du Sud-Est J3

=== Aero-Craft ===
(Aero-Craft Mfg Co Inc, Detroit, MI)

- Aero-Craft Aero-Coupe

=== Aero-Difusión ===
- Aero-Difusión D11 Compostela
- Aero-Difusión D-112 Popuplane
- Aero-Difusión D-119 Popuplane
- Aero-Difusión D-1190S Compostela

=== Aero-Flight ===
(Aero-Flight Aircraft Corp (Pres: J K Nagamatsu), Buffalo, NY)

- Aero-Flight Streak

=== Aero-Kros ===
(Aero-Kros Sp, z o. o., Krosno, Poland)

- Aero-Kros MP-02 Czajka

=== Aero-Service Jacek Skopiński ===
(Warsaw, Poland)

- Aero-Service Panda
- Aero-Service Puma

=== Aero-Tech ===
(Aero-Tech (pres: Alvin J Jarvis), Hastings, FL)

- Aero-Tech Boeing F4B/P-12C 4/5 scale replica

=== Aero-Works ===
- Aero-Works Aerolite 103

=== Aeroálcool ===
(Aeroálcool Tecnologia Ltda - Aeronaves, São Paulo, Brazil)

- Aeroálcool Quasar Lite
- Aeroálcool Quasar Fast
- Aeroálcool Quasar Baby

=== AeroAndina ===
- Agricopteros autogyro
- Agricopteros Scamp B
- Agricopteros Gold-Wing
- AeroAndina MXP-100 Aventura
- AeroAndina MXP-150 Kimbaya
- AeroAndina MXP-158 Embera
- AeroAndina MXP-640 Amigo
- AeroAndina MXP-650 Amigo-S
- AeroAndina MXP-740 Savannah
- AeroAndina MXP-740-F
- AeroAndina MXP-750
- AeroAndina MXP-800 Fantasy-Calima
- AeroAndina MXP-1000 Tayrona

=== AeroCad ===
(AeroCad Inc, Florissant, MO)

- AeroCad AeroCanard

=== Aerocar ===
- Aerocar 2000

=== Aerocar ===
(Aerocar International / Aerocar Inc.)

- Aerocar I
- Aerocar II Aero-Plane
- Aerocar III
- Aerocar Bullet
- Aerocar Coot
- Aerocar Super-Coot
- Aerocar IMP ('Independently Made Plane')
- Aerocar Mini-IMP
- Aerocar Micro-IMP
- Aerocar Ultra-IMP
- Taylor Bullet

=== Aérocentre ===
(See Société Nationale de Constructions Aéronautiques du Centre SNCAC)

=== Aerochia ===
- Aerochia LT-1

=== Aerochute International ===
(Coburg North, Victoria, Australia)

- Aerochute International Dual

=== Aerocomp ===
see:-Comp Air (Aerocomp Inc, Merritt Island, FL)

=== Aerocomp AB ===
(Alingsas, Sweden)

- Aerocomp VM-1 Esqual

=== AeroCopter ===
- AeroCopter Futura (2003)

Just to precise this an autogyro.

=== Aerocraft ===
(Aerocraft R&D)

- Aerocraft Stealth Star 204 SS

=== Aerodis ===
- Aerodis AA200 Orion
- Aerodis AA300 Rigel
- Aerodis AA330 Theta

=== AeroDreams ===
- AeroDreams Chi-7

=== Aerodyne ===
(Aerodyne Systems Engineering Ltd.)

- Aerodyne M74 Wasp
- Aerodyne M79 Hornet

=== Aerodyne Systems ===
- Aerodyne Systems Vector 600
- Aerodyne Systems Vector 610
- Aerodyne Systems Vector 627
- Aerodyne Systems Vector 627SR

=== Aerodyne Technologies ===
(Talloires, France)

- Aerodyne Blaster
- Aerodyne Cherokee
- Aerodyne Cool
- Aerodyne Dune
- Aerodyne Freestyle
- Aerodyne Joy
- Aerodyne Jumbe
- Aerodyne Massai
- Aerodyne Shaman
- Aerodyne Shani
- Aerodyne Shaolin
- Aerodyne Shoot
- Aerodyne Totem Bi
- Aerodyne Yogi

=== Aerodynos ===
(Aerodynos de Colombia)

- Aerodynos JA 177 Evolution I
- Aerodynos JA 177 Evolution II
- Aerodynos JA 177 Pingouin

=== Aeroflying ===
(Saint-Andre des Eaux, France)

- Aeroflying Sensation

=== Aeroitba ===
(ITBA, Buenos Aires, Argentina)

- Aeroitba Petrel 912i

=== AeroJames ===
(Ajaccio, France)

- AeroJames 01 Isatis

=== Aerokopter ===
- Aerokopter ZA-6 San'ka
- Aerokopter AK1
- Aerokopter AK1-3 San'ka
- Aerokopter AK1-3CX
- Aerokopter AK1-5 San'ka

=== AeroKuhlmann ===
(AeroKuhlmann, La Ferté Alais, Cerny)

- AeroKuhlmann Scub

=== Aerola ===
- Aerola Alatus

=== Aerolab ===
(Aerolab SRL, Gallarate, Italy)

- Aerolab BiCamp
- Aerolab HiCamp
- Aerolab LoCamp

=== AeroLift ===
- AeroLift CycloCrane

=== AeroLites Inc. ===
(AeroLites Inc. (Pres: Daniel J Rochè), Welsh, LA)

- AeroLites Bearcat
- AeroLites Ag Bearcat
- AeroLites Sport Bearcat
- AeroLites AeroMaster AG
- AeroLites AeroSkiff

=== Aeromarine ===
- Aeromarine 1909 Flying Boat
- Aeromarine 8
- Aeromarine 39
- Aeromarine 40
- Aeromarine 50
- Aeromarine 52
- Aeromarine 55
- Aeromarine 60
- Aeromarine 75
- Aeromarine 80
- Aeromarine 85
- Aeromarine 700
- Aeromarine AM-1 1923 mailplane
- Aeromarine AM-2 1923 mailplane
- Aeromarine AM-3 Night Mail Carrier
- Aeromarine AMC
- Aeromarine AS
- Aeromarine AT
- Aeromarine BM-1 1924 mailplane
- Aeromarine CO-L
- Aeromarine DH-4B
- Aeromarine EO
- Aeromarine EDO Model B
- Aeromarine HS
- Aeromarine M-1
- Aeromarine NBS-1
- Aeromarine PG-1
- Aeromarine WM
- Aeromarine Limousine Flying Boat
- Aeromarine Navy Flying Cruiser
- Aeromarine Messenger
- Aeromarine Sea Scout
- Aeromarine Seaplane
- Aeromarine Sportsman

=== Aeromarine-Klemm ===
- Aeromarine-Klemm AKL-25
- Aeromarine-Klemm AKL-26
- Aeromarine-Klemm AKL-27
- Aeromarine-Klemm AKL-60
- Aeromarine-Klemm AKL-70
- Aeromarine-Klemm Model 70 Trainer

=== Aeromarine-LSA ===
(South Lakeland Airport, FL)

- Aeromarine Merlin

=== Aeromere ===
- Aeromere Falco
- Aeromere M-100

=== AeroMobil ===
- AeroMobil 3.0
- AeroMobil 4.0
- AeroMobil 5.0

=== Aeromobile ===
(Aeromobile Safety Plane Syndicate, 215 Thayer Bldg, Norwich, CT)

- Aeromobile Safety Plane

=== Aeromod ===
(Aeromod Inc (pres: E W Moore), N Little Rock, AR)

- Loadstar Model 100

=== Aeromot ===
(Aeromot, Brazil)

- Aeromot AMT-100 Ximango
- Aeromot AMT-100P Ximango
- Aeromot AMT-100R Ximango
- Aeromot AMT-200 Super Ximango
- Aeromot AMT-200S Super Ximango S
- Aeromot AMT-300 Turbo Xiamango Shark
- Aeromot AMT-300R Reboque
- Aeromot AMT-600 Guri
- Aeromot TG-14A (USAF:AMT-200 Super Ximango)

=== Aéronautic 2000 ===
- Aéronautic 2000 Baroudeur

=== Aeronautica Bonomi ===
(Vittorio Bonomi & Camillo Silva / Aeronautica Bonomi)

- Bonomi BS.15 Bigiarella
- Bonomi BS.17 Allievo Cantù
- Bonomi BS.19 Alca
- Bonomi BS.22 Alzavola

=== Aeronautica Lombarda ===
(Aeronautica Lombarda S.A.)

- Aeronautica Lombarda AL-3
- Aeronautica Lombarda GP.2 Asiago
- Aeronautica Lombarda AL-12P
- Aeronautica Lombarda A.R.
- Assalto Radioguidato

=== Aeronáutica Militar Española ===
- AME VI

=== Aeronautica Predappio ===
- Aeronautica Predappio Nuova

=== Aeronautica Umbra ===
- Aeronautica Umbra Trojani AUT.18
- Aeronautica Umbra Trojani MB.902
- Aeronautica Umbra AUM-903

=== Aeronautical Engineering Co ===
See:Abreu

=== Aeronautical Manufacturing Enterprise ===
(Aeronautical Manufacturing Enterprise - Algeria)

- Aeronautical Manufacturing Enterprise Fernas-142
- Aeronautical Manufacturing Enterprise Safir-43

=== Aeronautical Products ===
See:Aero Products

=== Aeronava ===
- Aeronava Ag-6

=== Aeronca ===
(Aeronautical Corp of America)

- Aeronca 6
- Aeronca 7 Champion
- Aeronca 9 Arrow
- Aeronca 11 Chief
- Aeronca 12 Chum
- Aeronca 15 Sedan
- Aeronca 50 Chief
- Aeronca 60 Tandem
- Aeronca 65 Super Chief
- Aeronca Tandem
- Aeronca Defender
- Aeronca C-1 Cadet
- Aeronca C-2
- Aeronca C-3
- Aeronca CF Scout
- Aeronca K
- Aeronca LA
- Aeronca LB
- Aeronca LC
- Aeronca LCS
- Aeronca LNR (XLNR-1)
- Aeronca L-3 Grasshopper
- Aeronca O-58 Grasshopper
- Aeronca L-16
- Aeronca TG-5
- Aeronca TG-33
- Aeronca Monowheel Racer

=== Aeronca ===
- Aeronca 100
- Aeronca 300
- Ely 700

=== Aeroneer ===
seePhillips

=== Aeroneering ===
- Miller Lil' Rascal

=== Aeronix ===
(Aronix sarl, La Chapelle-Vendômoise, France)

- Aeronix Airelle

=== Aeropepe ===
(Aeropepe, Recife, Brazil)

- Flamingo

=== Aeropilot ===
(Aeropilot SRO, Calav, Czech Republic)

- Aeropilot Legend 540

=== Aeroplastika ===
(Avia Baltika / Aeroplastika)

- Aeroplastika LAK-X

=== Aeroprakt ===
(Ukraine:Kiev / Russian Federation:LM Aeropract Samara / KB Aeropract / Aeropract JSC)

- Aeroprakt T-8
- Aeroprakt A-6 White
- Aeroprakt A-11M Hamlet
- Aeroprakt A-15
- Aeroprakt A-19
- Aeroprakt A-20
- Aeroprakt A-21 Solo
- Aeroprakt A-22 (L / Foxbat / Vision / Valor / Shark)
- Aeroprakt A-23 Dragon
- Aeroprakt A-24 Viking
- Aeroprakt A-25 Breeze
- Aeroprakt A-26 Vulcan
- Aeroprakt A-27
- Aeroprakt A-28 Victor
- Aeroprakt A-30 Vista Speedster
- Aeroprakt A-32 Vixxen
- Aeroprakt A-33 Dragon
- Aeroprakt A-36 Super Vulcan
- Aeroprakt A-41
- Aeroprakt AP-55

=== Aeropro CZ ===
- Aeropro Eurofox

=== Aeroprogress/ROKS-Aero ===
- ROS-Aeroprogress T-101 Grach
- Aeroprogress T-106 Orel 2
- Aeroprogress T-108 Zolotoy Orel
- Aeroprogress T-110
- Aeroprogress T-112
- Aeroprogress T-121 Grif
- Aeroprogress T-130 Fregat
- Aeroprogress T-132
- Aeroprogress T-134
- Aeroprogress T-204 Progress
- Aeroprogress T-205
- Aeroprogress T-208 Orel
- Aeroprogress T-21 Sapsan
- Aeroprogress T-401 Sokol
- Aeroprogress T-407 Skborets
- Khrunichev T-411 Aist
- Aeroprogress T-415
- Aeroprogress T-423
- Aeroprogress T-433 Flamingo
- Aeroprogress T-435 Korvet
- Aeroprogress T-455
- Aeroprogress T-501 Strizh
- Aeroprogress T-504 Skborets
- Aeroprogress F-504 fighter
- Aeroprogress F-505 Strekoza
- Aeroprogress F-572
- Aeroprogress T-602 Orel
- Aeroprogress T-610 Voyazh
- Aeroprogress T-710 Anaconda
- Aeroprogress T-720
- Aeroprogress T-730
- Aeroprogress T-752
- Aeroprogress T-910 Kuryer

=== Aeroput ===
(Aeroput workshops, Zemun, Belgrade)

- Aeroput MMS-3

=== Aeroric ===
(AERORIC NAUCHNO-PROIZVODSTVENNOYE PREDPRIYATIE OOO (Aeroric Scientific-Production Enterprise Ltd))

- Aeroric Dingo

=== Aeros ===
(Kyiv, Ukraine)

- Aeros-1
- Aeros-2
- Aeros AC-21
- Aeros AL-12
- Aeros Accent
- Aeros ANT
- Aeros Amigo
- Aeros Combat
- Aeros Cross Country
- Aeros Discus
- Aeros Fox
- Aeros Fuego
- Aeros Mister X
- Aeros Phaeton
- Aeros Rival
- Aeros Sky Ranger
- Aeros Stealth
- Aeros Stalker
- Aeros Target
- Aeros Style
- Aeros Virtuoso
- Aeros Vitamin
- Aeros Zig-Zag

=== Aeros del Sur ===
(Argentina)

- Aeros del Sur Manta

=== Aeros SRO (CZ) ===
(Kutná Hora, Czech Republic)

- Aeros UL-2000 Flamingo

=== AeroSamara ===
- AeroSamara F-41 Elbrus

=== Aeroscraft ===
- Aeroscraft ML866
- Aeroscraft ML868

=== Aeroscript ===
(Aeroscript Corp (Morris Kamar, Pincus Cashman, Minnie Israel), New York, NY)

- Aeroscript 1929 Aeroplane

=== Aerosette ===
(Aerosette SRO, Chrastava, Czech Republic)

- Aerosette MH-46 Eclipse

=== Aerosonde Ltd ===
- Insitu Aerosonde

=== Aerospace ===
- Aerospace Airtrainer
- Aerospace Fletcher
- Aerospace Cresco

=== Aerospace General ===
- Aerospace General Mini-Copter

=== Aérospatiale ===
(Société Nationale d'Industrie Aérospatiale)

- Aérospatiale Caravelle 12
- Aérospatiale Corvette (SN600 series)
- Aérospatiale Cougar (AS530 series)
- Aérospatiale Panther (AS560 series)
- Aérospatiale Puma (SA330 series)
- Aérospatiale Dauphin (SA360 series)
- Aérospatiale Dauphin 2 (SA365 series)
- Aérospatiale Dolphin (USCG SA366G)
- Aérospatiale Fregate (N262/Mohawk298)
- Aérospatiale Epsilon (TB-30)
- Aérospatiale Gazelle (SA-340 series)
- Aérospatiale Lama (SA-315)
- Aérospatiale Ludion
- Aérospatiale Omega (TB-31)
- Aérospatiale Ecureuil (AS/SA-350 series)
- Aérospatiale AStar
- Aérospatiale TwinStar
- Aérospatiale Super-Caravelle (SE-121 series)
- Aérospatiale Super Puma (SA332 series)
- Aérospatiale C.22
- Aérospatiale Fouga 90
- Aérospatiale N 500
- Aérospatiale AGV
- Aérospatiale AS.100
- Aérospatiale ATSF
- Aérospatiale Pégase
- Aérospatiale SA.331 Puma Makila
- Aérospatiale X.380
- Aérospatiale Dauphin 2 CDVE
- Aérospatiale/CATIC p. 120L
- Concorde

=== Aerospool ===
(Aerospool SRO, Prievidza, Slovakia)

- Aerospool WT9 Dynamic
- Aerospool WT10 Advantic

=== Aerosport OY ===
(Keila, Estonia)

- Aerosport OY Evo
- Aerosport OY Spider
- Aerosport OY Sport
- Aerosport OY Sport Next
- Aerosport OY Sport Power
- Aerosport OY Sport+
- Aerosport OY Trike PT1+1
- Aerosport OY Trike T1+1
- Aerosport OY Trike PT2

=== Aerosport ===
(Aerosport Pty. Ltd.)

- Aerosport Supapup Mk 4

=== Aerosport ===
(Aerosport Inc (Fdr: Harris L Woods), Holly Springs, NC)

- Aerosport Quail
- Aerosport Rail
- Aerosport Scamp
- Aerosport Woody Pusher

=== AeroSports Gr ===
- G-AeroSports Lygistis
- G-AeroSports SF/1 Archon
- G-Aerosports G802 Atairon

=== Aerostar ===
(Aerostar Aircraft Corp, Coeur d'Alene, ID)

- Aerostar 700
- Aerostar Super 700
- Aerostar FJ-100

=== Aerostar ===
(Butler Aviation, Kerrville, TX)

- Aerostar Executive
- Aerostar Ranger

=== Aerostar ===
(Aerostar SA, Bacău, Romania)

- Aerostar R40S Festival
- Aerostar (Yakovlev) Iak-52
- Aerostar 01
- Aerostar AG-6

=== Aérostructure ===
(Aérostructure arl, France)

- Aérostructure Lutin 80

=== Aerostyle Ultraleicht Flugzeuge ===
- Aerostyle Breezer

=== Aerosud ===
- Advanced High Performance Reconnaissance Light Aircraft

=== AeroTalleres Guarani ===
- AeroTalleres Guarani Paraguay 1

=== Aerotec ===
(Technologías Aeronauticas S.A. – Colombia) See: AeroAndina

=== Aerotec ===
(Aerotec S/A Industria Aeronáutica)

- Aerotec A-122 Uirapuru
- Aerotec A-132 Tangará
- Aerotec A-135 Tangará II
- Aerotec T-23, T-23B and T-23C

=== Aerotécnica ===
- Aerotécnica AC-11
- Aerotécnica AC-12
- Aerotécnica AC-13
- Aerotécnica AC-14
- Aerotécnica AC-15
- Aerotécnica AC-21
- Aerotécnica EC-XZ-2
- Aerotécnica EC-XZ-4

=== Aerotechnics ===
(Brandenburg Germany)

- Aerotechnics Skyhopper-3000

=== Aerotechnik ===
(Evektor-Aerotechnik, Kunovice, Czech Republic)

- Aerotechnik L-13 Vivat sailplane
- Aerotechnik A-70 rotorkite

=== Aerotechnik, Entwicklung und Apparatebau ===
(Aerotechnik, Entwicklung und Apparatebau GmbH)

- Aerotechnik WGM.21
- Aerotechnik WGM.22

=== Aerotek ===
(Aerotek II, 1042 S Washington St, Afton, WY)

- Call-Air B-1
- Call-Air B-1A

=== Aerotique ===
(Aerotique Aviation, United States)

- Aerotique Parasol

=== AeroVironment ===
- AeroVironment SkyTote
- NASA Pathfinder
- NASA Pathfinder Plus
- NASA Centurion
- NASA Helios
- NASA Pathfinder
- Solar Challenger
- Solar Impulse

=== AeroVolga ===
- AeroVolga L-6
- AeroVolga LA-8 (Flkagman)
- AeroVolga Borey
- AeroVolga DS-18
- AeroVolga AS-5.0
- AeroVolga TCA-AMH23

=== AESL ===
(Aero Engine Services Ltd)

- AESL CT-4 Airtrainer

=== Aetna ===
(Aetna Aircraft Corp, Glendale, CA)

- Aetna Aerocraft 2SA (later Aetna 2SA)

=== AFCO ===
(AFCO Shipyard company - India)

- AFCO RL-3 Monsoon

=== Affordaplane Aircraft ===
- Affordaplane

=== AFG Memel ===
(Allgemeine Flug-Gesellschaft Memel)

- AFG.1

=== AFU ===
(Aktiengesellschaft für Flugzeugunternehmungen)

- AFU AA-7
- AFU AJ-7
- AFU AR-7

=== Aggergaard ===
(Arthur & Peter Aggergaard, Viborg, SD)

- Aggergaard A-1

=== AGO ===
(AGO Flugzeugwerke (Aktien Gesellschaft Otto) - Johannistal / for Aeroplanbau Gustav Otto & Alberti see Otto)

- AGO Wasserdoppeldecker 1914
- AGO C.I
- AGO C.I-W
- AGO C.II
- AGO C.II-W
- AGO C.III
- AGO C.IV
- AGO C.VII
- AGO C.VIII
- AGO DV.3
- AGO S.I
- AGO Ao 192 Kurier (Courier)
- AGO Ao 225
- AGO W.II

=== Agrocopteros ===
(Agrocopteros Ltda.) See: AeroAndina

=== Agusta ===
(Construzioni Aeronautiche Giovanni Agusta)

- Agusta B.6
- CAGA Agusta AG.2.
- Agusta P.110
- Agusta A.101
- Agusta A.102
- Agusta A.103
- Agusta A.104
- Agusta A.104BT
- Agusta A.105
- Agusta A.106
- Agusta A.109
- Agusta A.115
- Agusta A.119
- Agusta A.129 Mangusta
- Agusta-Zappata AZ-8L
- Agusta AZ.101G
- Agusta CP-110
- Agusta-Bell AB.47G
- Agusta-Bell AB.102
- Agusta-Bell AB.139
- Agusta-Bell AB.204
- Agusta-Bell AB.204AS
- Agusta-Bell AB.205
- Agusta-Bell AB.206 JetRanger
- Agusta-Bell AB.212
- Agusta-Bell AB.212ASW
- Agusta-Bell AB.214A
- Agusta-Sikorsky HH-3F
- Agusta-Sikorsky S-61A-4
- Agusta-Sikorsky SSH-3D
- Meridionali/Agusta EMA 124

=== AgustaWestland ===
- AgustaWestland AW101
  - AgustaWestland EH101
  - AgustaWestland CH-148 Petrel Canadian Armed Forces
  - AgustaWestland CH-149 Chimo Canadian Armed Forces
  - AgustaWestland CH-149 Cormorant Canadian Armed Forces
  - AgustaWestland Merlin
- AgustaWestland AW109
- AgustaWestland AW119 Koala
- AgustaWestland AW129 Mangusta
- AgustaWestland AW139
- AgustaWestland AW149
- AgustaWestland AW159 Wildcat
- AgustaWestland AW169
- AgustaWestland AW189
- AgustaWestland AW249

=== Ahill ===
- Ahill-2

=== Ahlert ===
(Gebrüder Ahlert)

- Ahlert flugboot

=== Ahrens ===
(Ralph Ahrens, Tacoma, WA)

- Ahrens A

=== Ahrens ===
(Ahrens Aircraft Corp, Oxnard, CA)

- Ahrens AR 404

=== Ahrens & Schulz ===
- Ahrens & Schulz L 1 "Blauer Heinrich"
- Ahrens & Schulz L 2

=== AHRLAC ===
(AHRLAC Holdings (Advanced High Performance Reconnaissance Light Aircraft))

- AHRLAC Holdings Ahrlac
