= Acme Sierra =

Acme S-1 Sierra (Sue)

General information
- Type: Experimental light aircraft
- National origin: United States of America
- Manufacturer: Acme Aircraft Company (Sierradyne Inc.)
- Designer: Ron Beattie, Walt Fellers
- Status: Museum exhibit
- Number built: 1

History
- First flight: 23 November 1953

The Acme Aircraft Co S-1 Sierra was an experimental aircraft of unusual configuration built in the US in 1948 to investigate the advantages of a pusher propeller configuration. Apart from this engine installation, the aircraft was unusual in having an Y-shaped tail incorporating ruddervators on the upper fins. The wing was shoulder-mounted on the fuselage and was unswept.

During the 1960s, the US aerospace manufacturer Northrop used the aircraft as a technology demonstrator for boundary layer control concepts.

== Specifications (S-1 Sierra) ==
Data from Flight Magazine

General characteristics

- Crew: 1
- Length: 18 ft (5.5 m)
- Wingspan: 30 ft (9.1 m)
- Height: 5 ft 9 in (1.75 m)
- Wing area: 67 sq ft (6.2 m^{2})
- Empty weight: 590 lb (268 kg)
- Gross weight: 900 lb (408 kg)
- Fuel capacity: 15
- Powerplant: 1 × Continental C-85 4-cyl. air-cooled horizontally-opposed piston engine, 85 hp (63 kW)

Performance

- Maximum speed: 200 mph (320 km/h, 170 kn)
- Cruise speed: 185 mph (298 km/h, 161 kn)
- Range: 500 mi (800 km, 430 nmi)
- Wing loading: 13.5 lb/sq ft (66 kg/m^{2})

== See also ==
Aircraft of comparable role, configuration, and era

- Göppingen Gö 9
