= Agusta CP-110 =

Prototype Italian light aircraft from the 1950s

CP-110
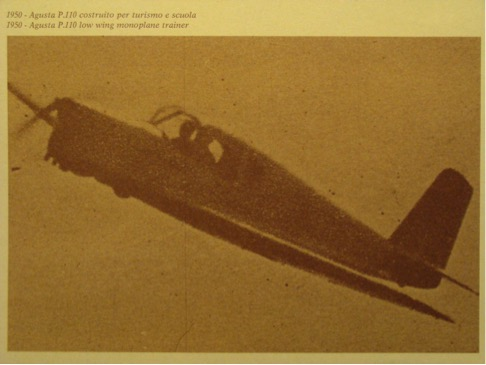

General information
- Type: Light cabin monoplane
- Manufacturer: Agusta
- Number built: 1

History
- First flight: 1951

The Agusta CP-110, also known as CVV P.110 or Politecnico P.110, was a prototype Italian four-seat light aircraft first flown in 1951 that failed to attract interest from either civil or military operators, although it was evaluated by the Aeronautica Militare (Italian Air Force). Originally designed and built by the CVV - (Centro Volo a Vela del Politecnico di Milano), production aircraft were to have been built by Agusta, but for lack of interest.

== Development ==
The P.110 was publicly described in the Italian aviation magazine L'Ala in February 1949 as a "tri-quadriposto" (three- or four-seat) aircraft, about two years before the first flight date given for the prototype.

== Specifications ==
Data from Jane's All The World's Aircraft 1951–52

General characteristics

- Crew: 1
- Capacity: 3 passengers
- Length: 7.30 m (23 ft 11 in)
- Wingspan: 10.60 m (34 ft 9 in)
- Wing area: 16.0 m^{2} (172 sq ft)
- Empty weight: 680 kg (1,499 lb)
- Gross weight: 1,100 kg (2,425 lb)
- Powerplant: 1 × Alfa Romeo 110-ter four-cylinder air-cooled inverted inline engine, 108 kW (145 hp)

Performance

- Maximum speed: 275 km/h (171 mph, 148 kn)
- Cruise speed: 240 km/h (150 mph, 130 kn)
- Stall speed: 90 km/h (56 mph, 49 kn)
- Range: 1,000 km (620 mi, 540 nmi)
- Take-off run: 170 m (560 ft)
- Landing run: 170 m (560 ft)
