= Aero A-24 =

1920s prototype bomber aircraft by Aero Vodochody

A-24
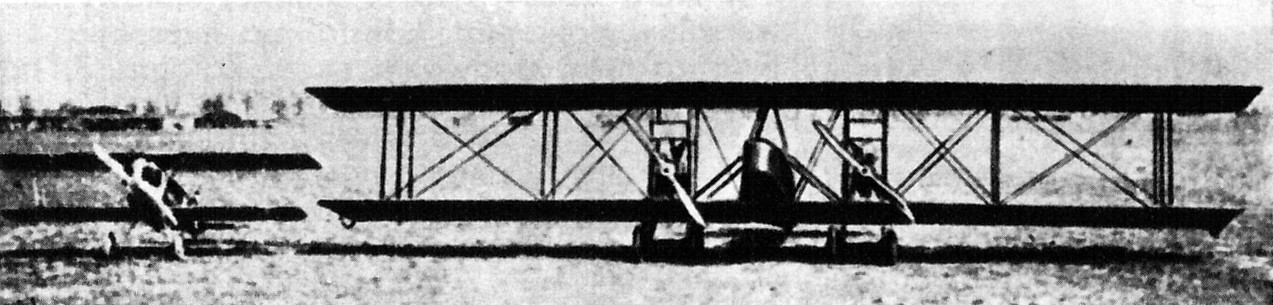

General information
- Type: Bomber
- National origin: Czechoslovakia
- Manufacturer: Aero
- Designer: Antonín Husník
- Status: Program Abandoned
- Primary user: Czechoslovak Air Force
- Number built: 1

History
- First flight: 1925
- Retired: 1930

The Aero A-24 (also referred to as the A.24) was a twin-engined biplane bomber aircraft of the 1920s. Flight tests showed it to be severely underpowered, making it useless as a combat aircraft. Only a single prototype was built.

Aero proposed a variant designated the A-27 that was to have overcome the A-24's shortcomings by re-engining the design with Bristol Jupiters, but the Czech Air Force was not interested in pursuing this option, and all development ceased.

== Specifications (A-24) ==
Data from

General characteristics

- Crew: 3/4
- Length: 13.7 m (44 ft 11 in)
- Wingspan: 22.2 m (72 ft 10 in)
- Height: 4.3 m (14 ft 1 in)
- Wing area: 106.0 m^{2} (1,141 sq ft)
- Empty weight: 2,960 kg (6,526 lb)
- Gross weight: 4,541 kg (10,011 lb)
- Powerplant: 2 × Maybach Mb.IV 6-cyl. water-cooled in-line piston engines, 180 kW (240 hp) each

Performance

- Maximum speed: 155 km/h (96 mph, 84 kn)
- Cruise speed: 110 km/h (68 mph, 59 kn)
- Range: 600 km (370 mi, 320 nmi)
- Endurance: 6 hours
- Service ceiling: 3,600 m (11,800 ft)
- Rate of climb: 1.36 m/s (267 ft/min)
- Time to altitude: 36 min 50 s to 3,000 m (9,800 ft)

Armament

- Bombs: up to 700 kg (1,500 lb) of bombs
