= Aéro Services Guépard Super Guépard =

French ultralight aircraft

Super Guépard
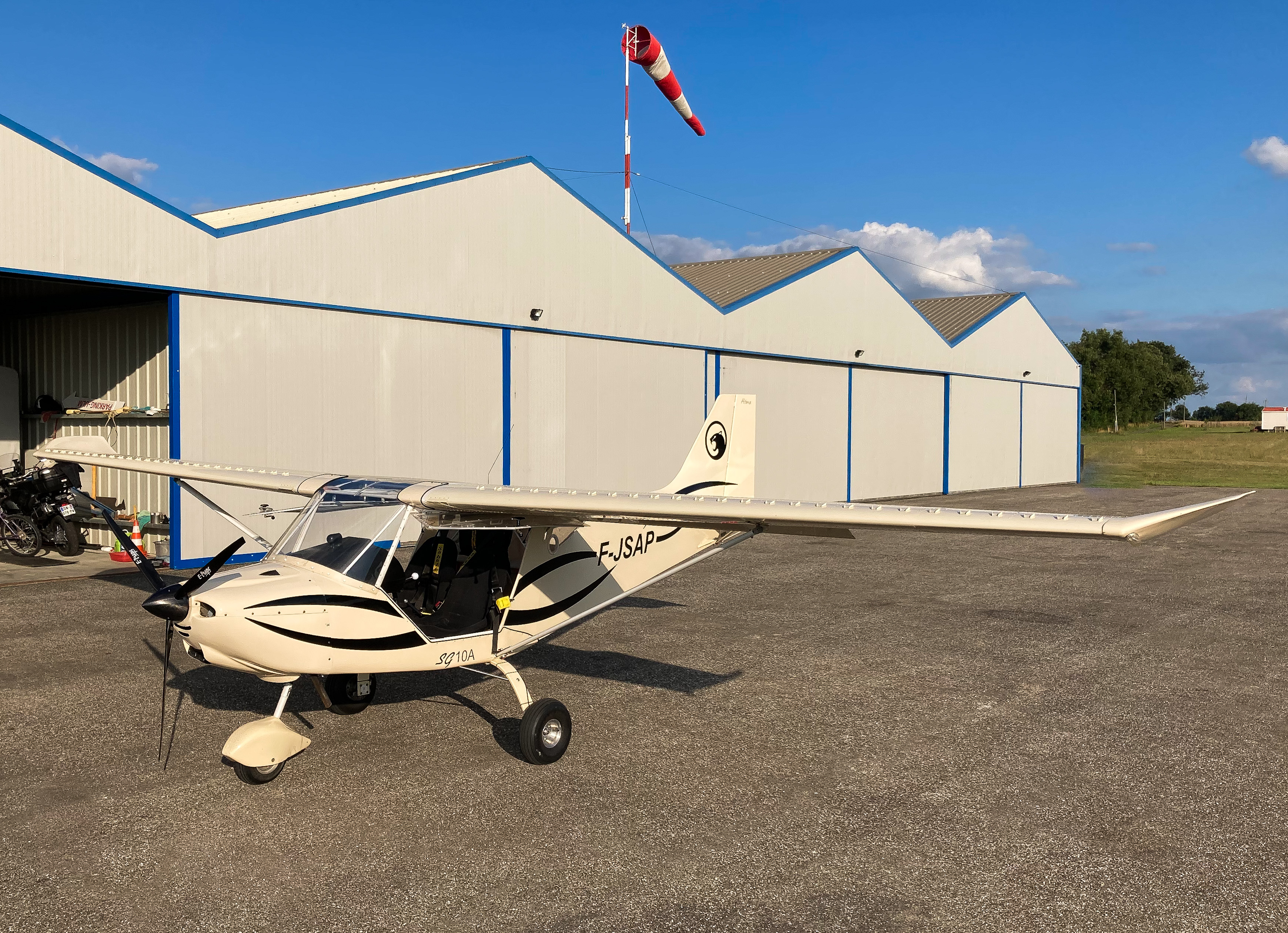

General information
- Type: Ultralight aircraft
- National origin: France
- Manufacturer: Aéro Services Guépard
- Status: In production (2023)

The Aéro Services Guépard Super Guépard SG 12 (English: Super Cheetah) is a French ultralight aircraft that was designed and produced by Aéro Services Guépard by of Villefranche-de-Rouergue. The aircraft is supplied as a complete ready-to-fly-aircraft.

== Design and development ==
The aircraft was designed to comply with the Fédération Aéronautique Internationale microlight rules. It features a cantilever single-strut-braced high-wing, a two-seats-in-side-by-side configuration enclosed cabin with doors, fixed tricycle landing gear and a single engine in tractor configuration.

The aircraft is made from welded steel tubing with its wings made from aluminum sheet. Its 8.5 m (27.9 ft) span wing has an area of 12.75 m^{2} (137.2 sq ft) and flaps. The standard engine used is the 100 hp (75 kW) Rotax 912ULS four-stroke powerplant.

== Operational history ==
Reviewer Marino Boric described the design of the welded steel tube fuselage in a 2015 review as assuring "good protection for the crew".

== Specifications (Super Guépard SG 12) ==
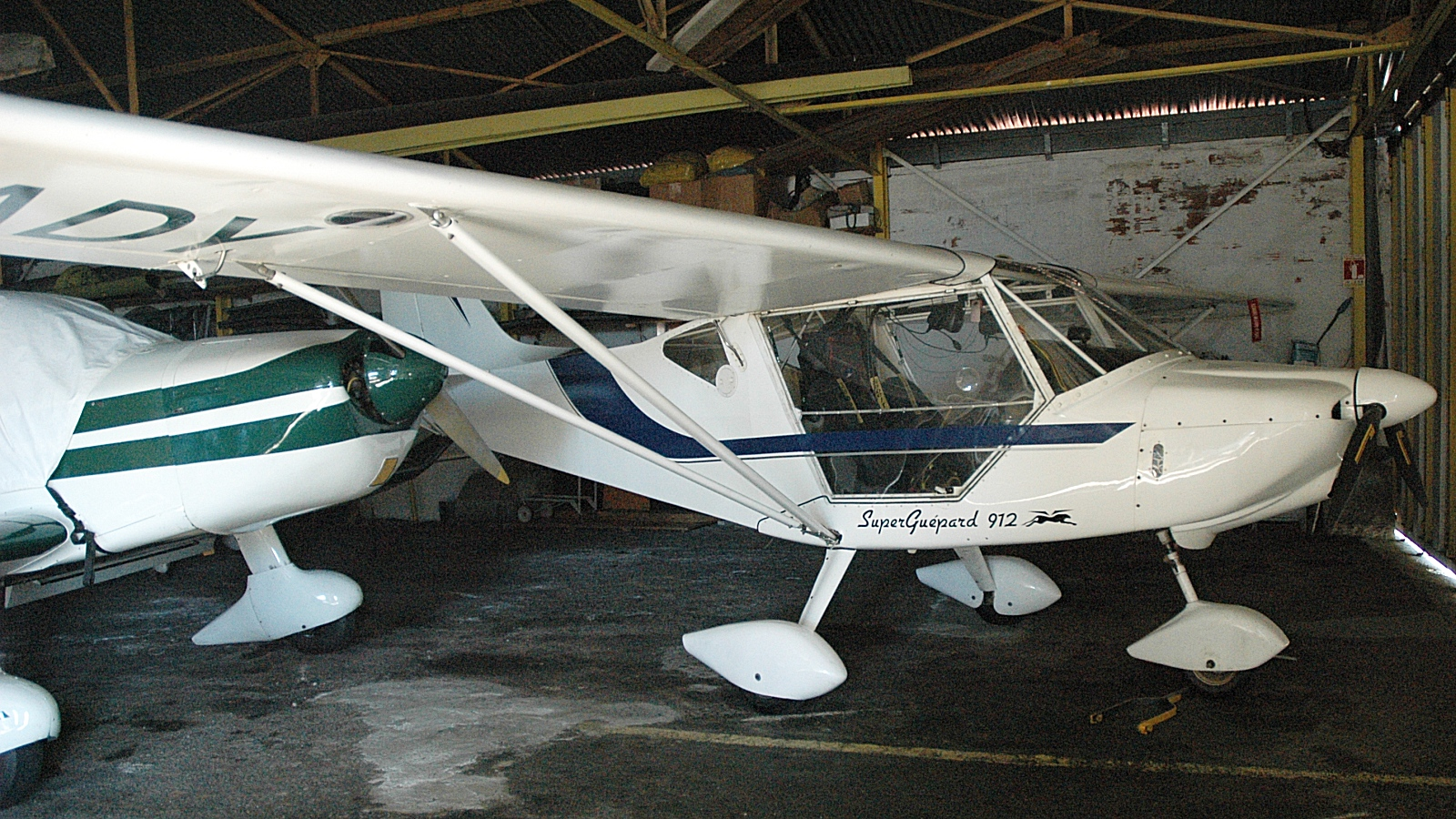
Super Guépard 912

Data from Tacke

General characteristics

- Crew: one
- Capacity: one passenger
- Wingspan: 8.5 m (27 ft 11 in)
- Wing area: 12.75 m^{2} (137.2 sq ft)
- Empty weight: 274 kg (604 lb)
- Gross weight: 450 kg (992 lb)
- Fuel capacity: 60 litres (13 imp gal; 16 US gal)
- Powerplant: 1 × Rotax 912ULS four cylinder, liquid and air-cooled, four stroke aircraft engine, 75 kW (101 hp)

Performance

- Maximum speed: 198 km/h (123 mph, 107 kn)
- Stall speed: 62 km/h (39 mph, 33 kn)
- Rate of climb: 5.8 m/s (1,140 ft/min)
- Wing loading: 35.3 kg/m^{2} (7.2 lb/sq ft)
