= American Aircraft Penetrator =

Gunship helicopter

Penetrator

General information
- Type: Experimental attack/transport helicopter
- National origin: United States
- Manufacturer: American Aircraft Corporation/American Aircraft International (now Aerocraft R&D)
- Status: development continued & finished, ready for test flights again
- Number built: 1

History
- First flight: 1991
- Developed from: Bell UH-1B Iroquois

The American Aircraft Penetrator, now referred as the Aerocraft Stealth Star 204 SS, was a gunship helicopter modified from the Bell UH-1B Iroquois with tandem seating for the pilots and a troop-carrying compartment. It was first designed by the American Aircraft Corporation (AAC) and was marketed by a separate company, American Aircraft International (AAI).

== Design and development ==
In 1990, a single Bell UH-1B Huey was stripped down to the engine, transmission and tail boom. A complete armored composite structure was added and the flight controls and seating were modified to a tandem layout, with pilot in front and copilot at the rear. The third and fourth weapons operators were placed in the rear portion of the fuselage firing weapons to the rear. The outer fuselage mounted stub wings, two glazed gun turrets/observation windows under each side of the engine with rear-facing 20mm gun turret under the fuselage, and two forward-facing 12.7mm turrets under the cockpit. The prototype (N3080W ex U.S. Army 63-8508) used a 1300 shp Avco Lycoming T53-L-13 turboshaft engine and had a gross take-off weight of 4280 kg.

The stated goal of the project was to convert existing Vietnam War-era UH-1 airframes to fit modern armor and weapons systems, particularly targeting third-world militaries with aging fleets. This conversion could be performed at a fraction of the cost of ordering a brand new aircraft. The Penetrator required a crew of four (pilot, forward weapons officer, and two rear-facing weapons operators) and could carry six to eight additional passengers.

The basic Penetrator was said to be air-to-air, air-to-ground and ground-to-ground combat capable, using modified technologies. It had been in development and could be seen on the Stealthstar website prior to its inactivation.

== Operational history ==
A single prototype was completed in 1991, and test flown in October of that year, but the manufacturer never won any contracts for production. The prototype aircraft was overhauled by Robert Laura and flying as of 2004.

== Specifications ==
General characteristics

- Crew: 4
- Length: 48 ft 9.5 in (14.872 m)
- Wingspan: 20 ft 1 in (6.12 m) (stub wings)
- Height: 13 ft 8 in (4.17 m)
- Wing area: 80 sq ft (7.4 m^{2})
- Empty weight: 5,200 lb (2,359 kg)
- Max takeoff weight: 8,500 lb (3,856 kg)
- Fuel capacity: 1,600 lb (730 kg).
- Powerplant: 1 × Avco Lycoming T53-L-13 turboshaft, 1,300 hp (970 kW)
- Main rotor diameter: 48 ft 4 in (14.73 m)
- Main rotor area: 1,809.56 sq ft (168.114 m^{2})

Performance

- Maximum speed: 76 kn (87 mph, 140 km/h)
- Cruise speed: 120 kn (140 mph, 230 km/h) at 5,700 ft (1,700 m)
- Never exceed speed: 169 kn (195 mph, 314 km/h)
- Range: 420 nmi (480 mi, 770 km)
- Endurance: 3.5 hours
- Service ceiling: 18,000 ft (5,500 m)
- Rate of climb: 1,800 ft/min (9.1 m/s)
- Hover out of Ground Effect: 4,000 ft (1,200 m).

Armament

- 2x forward-facing 20mm gun turrets under the cockpit.
- 2x rear-facing 12.7mm turrets under the fuselage.
- 2,500 lb (1,134 kg) of ordnance
