= Aerodynos JA 177 Evolution =

JA 177 Evolution
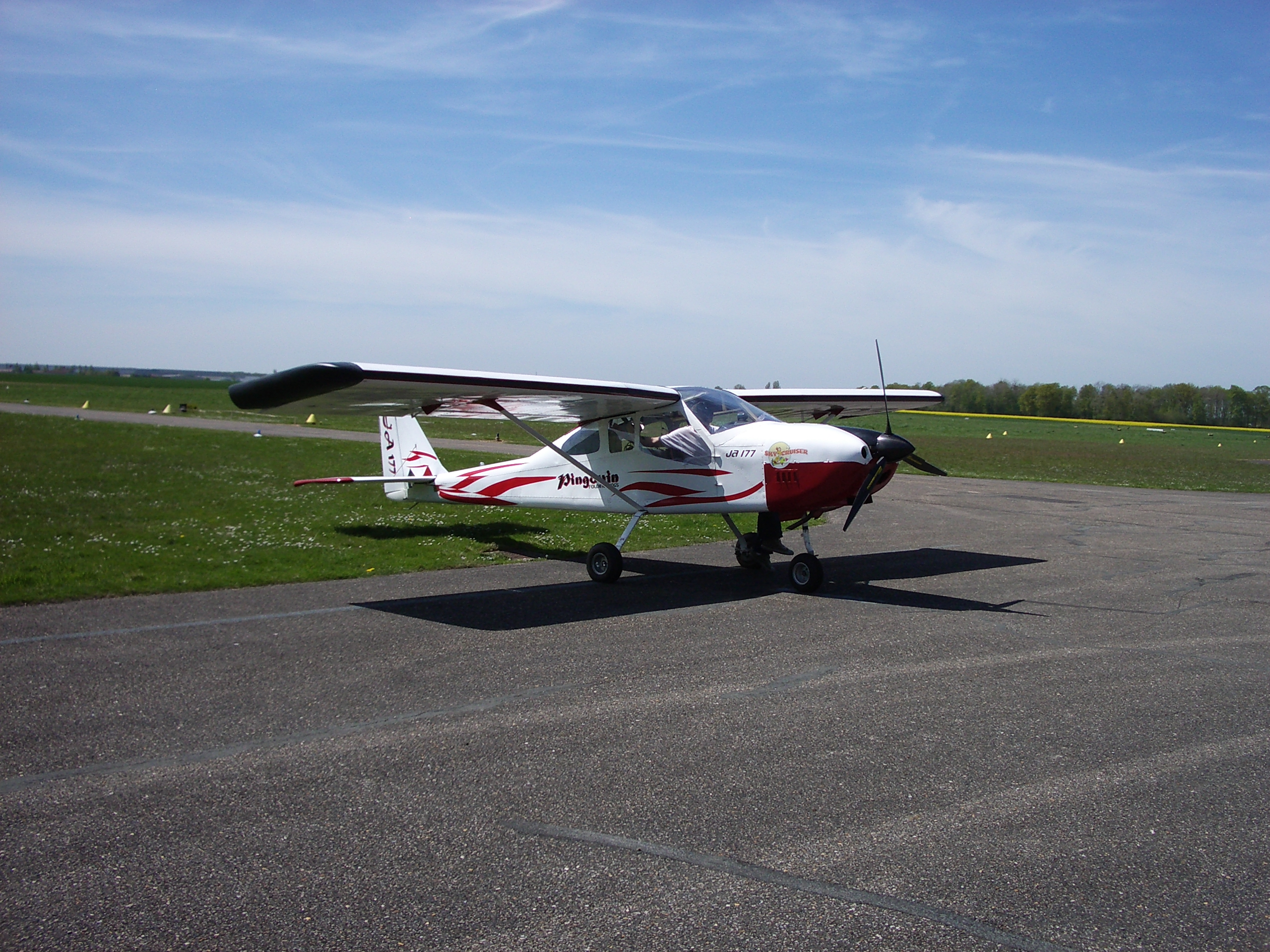
- Aerodynos JA 177 Evolution

General information
- Type: Two-seat ultralight aircraft
- National origin: Colombia
- Manufacturer: Aerodynos de Colombia

The Aerodynos JA 177 Evolution is a Colombian two-seat ultralight monoplane produced by Aerodynos de Colombia to be sold complete or as a homebuilt.

== Design and development ==
The design was started in 2003. The Evolution is a high-wing strut-braced monoplane with side-by-side seating for two. It is powered by a 98.6 hp (74 kW) Rotax 912 ULS flat-four piston engine with a three-bladed propeller. An economy variant (the JA 177 Pingouin) is being sold in France for the European market.

== Variants ==
Evolution I
Original variant
Evolution II
Improved variant
Pingouin
Economy variant

== Specifications (Evolution II with Rotax 912) ==
Data from Jane's All the World's Aircraft 2008-2009

General characteristics

- Crew: 1
- Capacity: 1
- Length: 7.15 m (23 ft 5.5 in)
- Wingspan: 7.80 m (25 ft 7 in)
- Height: 2.00 m (6 ft 6.75 in)
- Wing area: 12.00 m^{2} (129.2 sq ft)
- Empty weight: 275 kg (606 lb)
- Gross weight: 475 kg (1,047 lb)
- Powerplant: 1 × Rotax 912 ULS air-cooled flat-four piston engine , 73.5 kW (98.6 hp)

Performance

- Maximum speed: 245 km/h (152 mph, 132 kn)
- Cruise speed: 200 km/h (124 mph, 108 kn)
- Stall speed: 63 km/h (40 mph, 35 kn)
- Rate of climb: 5.0 m/s (984 ft/min)
