= Aero A.17 =

General information
- Type: Sailplane
- Manufacturer: Aero Vodochody

History
- Manufactured: 1922
- First flight: 1922

The Aero A.17 was a small sailplane built in Czechoslovakia and first flown in 1922. The conventional sailplane wing and tail were held together by an open truss framework, which also supported the pilot.

== Specifications (Aero A.17) ==
General characteristics

- Crew: 1
- Length: 4.34 m (14 ft 3 in)
- Wingspan: 14.8 m (48 ft 7 in)
- Wing area: 15.9 m^{2} (171 sq ft)
- Empty weight: 47 kg (104 lb)
- Gross weight: 127 kg (280 lb)

Performance

- Wing loading: 7.4 kg/m^{2} (1.5 lb/sq ft)

== See also ==
Related lists

- List of gliders
