= Aerotechnik WGM.21 =

WGM.21
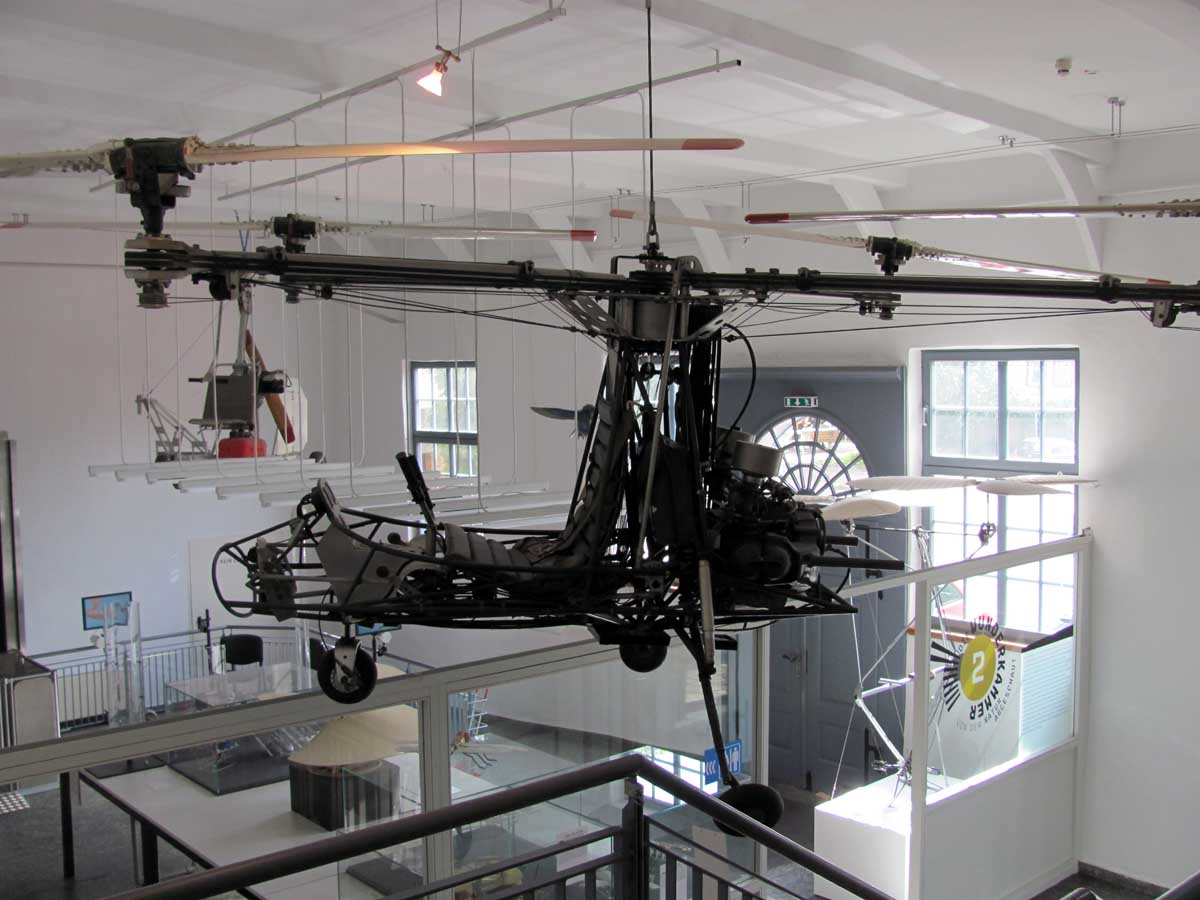

General information
- Type: Quadrotor helicopter
- Manufacturer: Aerotechnik

History
- Introduction date: 1969

The Aerotechnik WGM.21 is a quadrotor helicopter that was developed in the 1970s.

== Design and development ==
The WGM.21 is an open cockpit quadrotor. Four rotors are mounted at the end of a four tubular supports arranged into a X shape. Cyclic and collective controls are mixed into a single control yoke. Pitch is controlled by foot pedals. A second model, the WGM.22, was developed with side-by-side configuration seating and an enclosed cockpit.

== Variants ==
WGM.21
Single seat prototype
WGM.22
Two seat enclosed version

== Aircraft on display ==
- Hubschraubermuseum Bückeburg - prototype

== Specifications (WGM.21) ==
Data from Air Progress

General characteristics

- Crew: 1
- Empty weight: 90 kg (198 lb)
- Gross weight: 335 kg (739 lb)
- Powerplant: 1 × BMW 700 Automotive conversion, 40 kW (54 hp)
- Main rotor area: 21.3 m^{2} (229 sq ft)

Performance

- Maximum speed: 125 km/h (78 mph, 67 kn)
- Cruise speed: 115 km/h (71 mph, 62 kn)
- Service ceiling: 2,100 m (6,900 ft)
