= Abe Mizet =

General information
- Type: Sport Aircraft
- National origin: Japan
- Manufacturer: Keiichi Abe
- Designer: Keiichi Abe

History
- Introduction date: 1974
- First flight: 1974

The Abe Mizet (English: Midget) is a homebuilt aircraft design from builder Keiichi Abe of Japan. The aircraft was built with help from the Kushiro Aero Club. The Mizet is a rare example of a homebuilt aircraft designed and built for operations in Japan.

== Design ==
The Abe Mizet is a single-place open-cockpit, pusher, high-wing aircraft with tricycle landing gear, similar to a Breezy aircraft homebuilt design.

Keiichi Abe also assisted Don Taylor on the Japanese leg of his round-the-world flight in a homebuilt aircraft.

== Specifications (Mizet II) ==
Data from Jane's all the world's aircraft, 1975-76

General characteristics

- Crew: 1
- Length: 5.5 m (18 ft 1 in)
- Wingspan: 7.5 m (24 ft 7 in)
- Height: 2.2 m (7 ft 3 in)
- Wing area: 9 m^{2} (97 sq ft)
- Aspect ratio: 6.25
- Airfoil: Göttingen 387
- Empty weight: 180 kg (397 lb)
- Gross weight: 285 kg (628 lb)
- Max takeoff weight: 265 kg (584 lb)
- Fuel capacity: 7 L (1.8 US gal; 1.5 imp gal)
- Powerplant: 1 × Toyota 2U-1 two cylinder modified car engine, 26 kW (35 hp)
- Propellers: 2-bladed fixed pitch propeller, 1.1 m (3 ft 7 in) diameter

Performance

- Maximum speed: 79 km/h (49 mph, 43 kn)
- Cruise speed: 80 km/h (50 mph, 43 kn)
- Stall speed: 65.2 km/h (40.5 mph, 35.2 kn)
- Range: 70 km (43 mi, 38 nmi)
- Service ceiling: 1,500 m (4,900 ft)
- Rate of climb: 1.2 m/s (240 ft/min)
