= Aero A.46 =

A.46

General information
- Type: Trainer
- National origin: Czechoslovakia
- Manufacturer: Aero
- Number built: 1

The Aero A.46 was a Czechoslovak military trainer biplane that flew in prototype form in 1931. No mass production resulted from Aero.

== Specifications (A.46) ==
General characteristics

- Crew: two, student and instructor
- Length: 8.45 m (27 ft 9 in)
- Wingspan: 11.82 m (38 ft 9 in)
- Wing area: 32.6 m^{2} (351 sq ft)
- Empty weight: 1,134 kg (2,500 lb)
- Gross weight: 1,488 kg (3,280 lb)
- Powerplant: 1 × Skoda-built Hispano-Suiza 8Fb V-8 water-cooled piston engine, 224 kW (300 hp)

Performance

- Maximum speed: 196 km/h (122 mph, 106 kn)
- Service ceiling: 4,850 m (15,910 ft)
- Rate of climb: 2.783 m/s (547.8 ft/min)
- Wing loading: 46 kg/m^{2} (9.4 lb/sq ft)
- Power/mass: 0.150 W/kg (0.09 hp/lb)
