= Eurocopter Ecureuil =

Eurocopter Écureuil may refer to one of three related helicopter designs, each of which was originally manufactured by Aérospatiale (later part of Eurocopter Group, now Airbus Helicopters).

- Eurocopter AS350 Écureuil helicopter
- Eurocopter AS355 Écureuil 2 helicopter
- Eurocopter EC130 Écureuil helicopter
