= Aero A.35 =

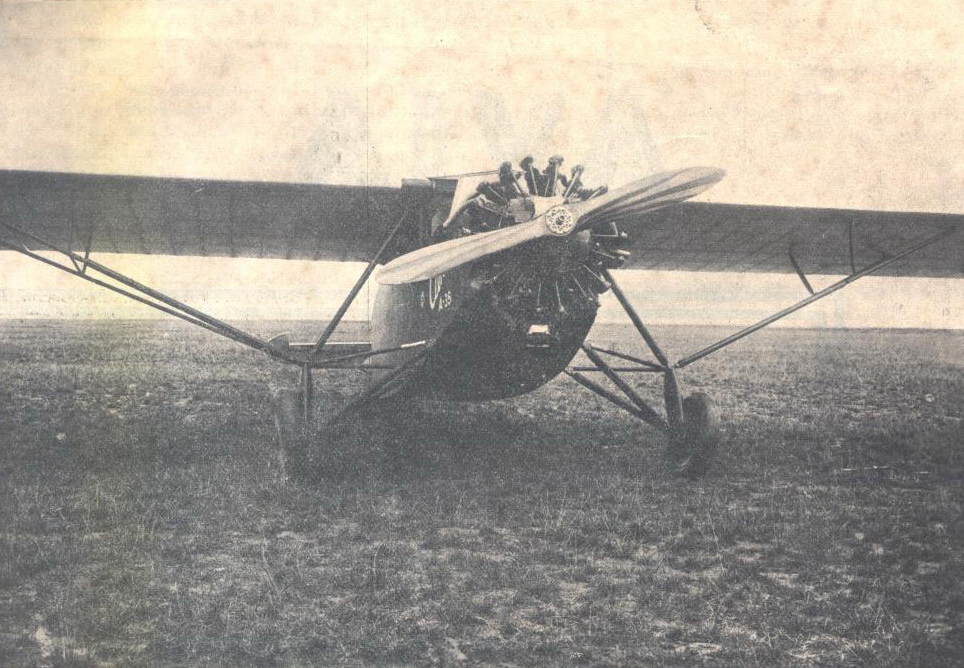

General information
- Type: Airliner
- National origin: Czechoslovakia
- Manufacturer: Aero Vodochody

History
- First flight: 1929

The Aero A.35 was a Czechoslovak airliner of the 1920s and 1930s. Designed by Aero for long-range flight, with a transatlantic crossing in mind, it saw service with CSA although no such crossing was ever attempted. It first flew in 1929. A conventional high-wing monoplane, it was a very modern design for its day in all but one respect – the cockpit still had open sides. An extra passenger could also be accommodated here, beside the pilot.

== Operational history ==
Two A.35s were sold to an industrial company, and were among the earliest aircraft purchased as corporate transports.

In June 1933, Czech Airlines flew the A.35 from the port town of Sušak (the former name for Rijeka). The aircraft was named the “Adriatic Express”.

== Operators ==
Czechoslovakia

- Czech Airlines

Kingdom of Yugoslavia

- Yugoslav Royal Air Force - One aircraft was impressed into military service in April 1940.

== Specifications (A.35) ==
Data from European Transport Aircraft since 1910

General characteristics

- Crew: 2
- Capacity: 5 passengers
- Length: 9.75 m (32 ft 0 in)
- Wingspan: 14.52 m (47 ft 8 in)
- Wing area: 28.7 m^{2} (309 sq ft)
- Empty weight: 1,120 kg (2,469 lb)
- Gross weight: 1,930 kg (4,255 lb)
- Powerplant: 1 × Walter Castor 7-cylinder air-cooled radial piston engine, 180 kW (240 hp)

Performance

- Maximum speed: 197 km/h (122 mph, 106 kn)
- Cruise speed: 170 km/h (110 mph, 92 kn) at 2,000 m (6,600 ft)
- Range: 660 km (410 mi, 360 nmi)
- Service ceiling: 4,700 m (15,400 ft)
