= Aero-Astra Okhotnik =

Russian autogyro

Okhotnik

General information
- Type: 2/3 seat autogyro
- National origin: Russia
- Manufacturer: Aviatsionnyy Nauchno-Yekhnicheskiy Tsentr Aero-Astra (Aero-Astra) Zhukovsky

History
- First flight: 2001-2002

The Aero-Astra Okhotnik (English: Hunter) is a Russian single engine, three seat autogyro of pusher, pod and boom configuration. It has been developed into several variants from 2001 to 2007.

== Design and development ==
The Okhotonik light autogyro first flew around 2002. It has since been developed through four distinct variants, the changes involving different model Subaru piston engines, several types and diameters of rotors, enclosed accommodation and some alterations to the tail. Most have been three seat models, though two seaters have been made and at least one flight demonstrated the ability of the Okhotnik to lift five people.

The Okhotnik is based on a low beam carrying seats, cabin, engine and tail. The three seats are arranged with the pilot alone in front and two close placed seats behind. The engine and rotor pylon are immediately behind the rear seats. The cabin of the Okhotnik 2M and 3 variants is rounded and largely glazed, with side access doors. A two blade rotor with a gust-correcting vane just below its hub rotates freely above a support pylon, though it can be hydraulically pre-rotated for jump starts. The Subaru engine drives a five blade propeller of radius 950 mm (37.4 in), its tips passing close to the fuselage beam. Two tall, narrow chord tail surfaces are mounted at the end of this beam, at right angles to it but splaying outwards to form a V-Tail. They are supported at the top by an arched transverse member, itself attached by straight struts to the rotor pylon. On the Okhotnik 3 the top of a third, vertical and forward leaning tail surface is attached to this arch, its lower end held aft of the other tail surfaces on a strut to the fuselage beam.

== Operational history ==
The Okhotnik 2M appeared at the 2005 Moscow Salon in 2005 and the Okhotnik 3 at the same event in 2007. The latter gained its Certificate of Airworthiness in October 2007. Three two- seat Okhotniks were delivered during the winter of 2005-6.

== Variants ==
Okhotnik 1
Open seats, Subaru EJ25 engine and Dragon Wings 8.53 m (28 ft) rotor. Later fitted with a Rotary Air Force rotor. Lifted pilot and three passengers 16 October 2002.
Okhotnik 2
Rotary Air Force 9.14 m (30 ft) rotor. First flew 28 March 2003
Okhotnik 2M
Okhotnik 2 modified with enclosed seating and Subaru EJ-20 engine option.
Okhotnik 3
Subaru EZ-30 engine. Initial trials completed by November 2006. Enclosed seating and engine. Modified tail surfaces.

== Specifications (Okhotnik 3) ==
Data from Jane's All the World's Aircraft 2009/10

General characteristics

- Capacity: 3
- Length: 3.75 m (12 ft 4 in) fuselage
- Empty weight: 550 kg (1,213 lb)
- Max takeoff weight: 850 kg (1,874 lb)
- Fuel capacity: Standard 50L (13.5 US gal, 11.0 Imp gal); option of 80 L (21.1 US gal, 17.6 Imp gal)
- Powerplant: 1 × Subaru EZ-30 flat-six piston, geared down 2.28:1., 149 kW (200 hp)
- Main rotor diameter: 9.75 m (32 ft 0 in)
- Main rotor area: 75.7 m^{2} (815 sq ft) swept by 2-blade Rotary Air Force 2000.
- Propellers: 5-bladed KievProp, 1.90 m (6 ft 3 in) diameter pusher

Performance

- Maximum speed: 170 km/h (110 mph, 92 kn)
- Cruise speed: 135 km/h (84 mph, 73 kn)
- Range: 250 km (160 mi, 130 nmi) with standard tankage
- Rate of climb: 2.0 m/s (390 ft/min) maximum at sea level

Avionics

- Stratomaster flight and engine instrument display
