= Aero A.8 =

A.8

General information
- Type: Airliner
- National origin: Czechoslovakia
- Manufacturer: Aero
- Status: cancelled
- Number built: 1

History
- First flight: 1921

The Aero A.8 was the last realized construction of an aircraft by engineer Karel Rösner, a former chief designer of the German company Gotha, who after the First World War briefly joined the services of the Aero company. It was a passenger biplane for 4 passengers. Unlike most passenger airplanes of the time, which had the pilot seat positioned behind the wings, the pilot of A.8 was sitting under the leading edge of the wing. During the flight tests the airplane crashed in an accident into the wooden building of Main Aviation Workshops in Kbely. The development of the airplane was then abandoned.

== Specifications (A.8) ==
General characteristics

- Crew: 1
- Capacity: 4 passengers
- Length: 9.3 m (30 ft 6 in)
- Wingspan: 14.0 m (45 ft 11 in)
- Wing area: 49 m^{2} (530 sq ft)
- Empty weight: 1,442 kg (3,179 lb)
- Gross weight: 1,935 kg (4,266 lb)
- Powerplant: 1 × Maybach Mb.IVa 6-cyl. water-cooled piston engine, 177 kW (237 hp)

Performance

- Maximum speed: 140 km/h (87 mph, 76 kn)
- Cruise speed: 105 km/h (65 mph, 57 kn)
- Range: 600 km (370 mi, 320 nmi)
- Wing loading: 36.5 kg/m^{2} (7.5 lb/sq ft)
