= Abe Mizet II =

Mizet II

General information
- Type: Single seat homebuilt ultralight
- National origin: Japan
- Designer: K. Abe
- Number built: 1

History
- First flight: 9 December 1948

The Abe Mizet II is a simple single seat ultralight of pusher configuration, built in Japan just after World War II. First flown in 1948, the sole example remained active twenty five years later.

== Design and development ==
Designed during World War II by K. Abe, a Japanese schoolteacher, the Mizet II flew for the first time on 9 December 1948. It has constant chord, square tipped wings mounted onto a single, central girder which runs from just ahead of the leading edge back to the empennage. The pilot sits on an unenclosed seat below the leading edge, suspended from the central girder by a vertical strut and within an open, continuous frame defined by a second vertical girder from near the trailing edge, a horizontal keel girder which carries the lower seat mountings, rudder pedals and the simple tricycle undercarriage and completed by a sloping member ahead of the pilot on which simple instruments are mounted. A 25 hp (18.6 kW) motor car engine is mounted immediately behind the pilot in pusher configuration on an extension of the seat struttage.

Aft of the trailing edge the central girder is supplemented with a second, lower horizontal member, braced to the rear vertical part of the seating frame and covered to form a tail boom. The rectangular, wire braced horizontal tail is mounted on top of this, with a straight edged, largely rectangular rudder behind. This surface extends both above and below the boom, where there is a small ventral fin.

The sole Mizet remained in use until at least 1973.

== Specifications ==
Data from Jane's All the World's Aircraft 1974-75

General characteristics

- Crew: One
- Length: 5.50 m (18 ft 1 in)
- Wingspan: 7.60 m (24 ft 11 in)
- Height: 2.20 m (7 ft 3 in) over til
- Wing area: 9.00 m^{2} (96.9 sq ft)
- Aspect ratio: 6.5
- Airfoil: Göttingen 387
- Empty weight: 165 kg (364 lb)
- Max takeoff weight: 255 kg (562 lb)
- Powerplant: 1 × Paburica 800 cc two cylinder four stroke car engine, 19 kW (25 hp)
- Propellers: 2-bladed, 1.10 m (3 ft 7 in) diameter wooden pusher

Performance

- Wing loading: 28.2 kg/m^{2} (5.8 lb/sq ft)
- Power/mass: 73 W/kg (0.044 hp/lb)
