= Aerolab LoCamp =

Italian homebuilt aircraft

LoCamp
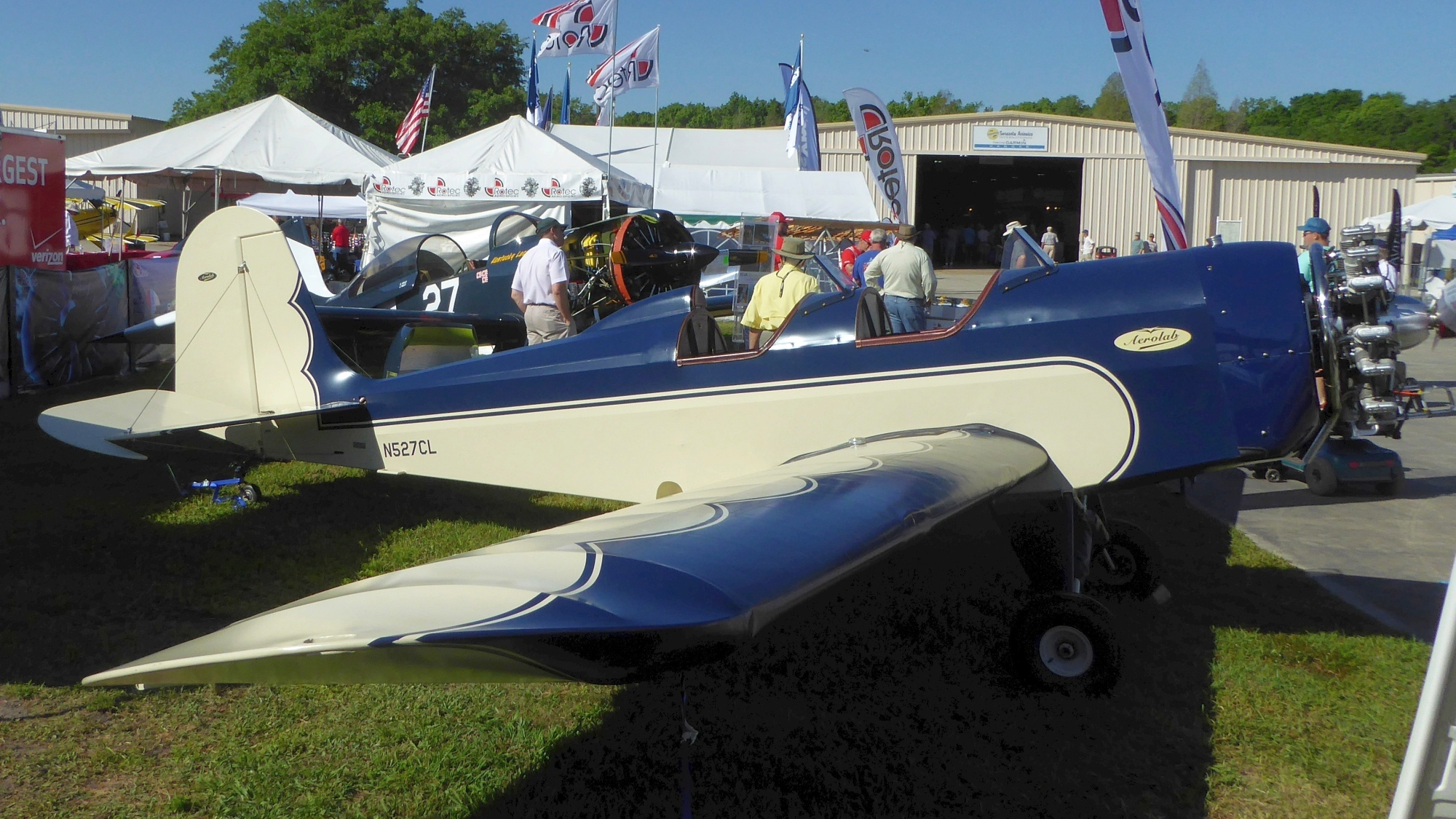

General information
- Type: Amateur-built aircraft
- National origin: Italy
- Manufacturer: Aerolab SRL; Golden Age Aeroworks
- Status: In production (2015)

The Aerolab LoCamp is an Italian amateur-built aircraft, designed and originally produced by Aerolab SRL of Gallarate. The aircraft is supplied as a kit for amateur construction, although the company plans to also certify the aircraft to JAR-VLA as well as produce a light-sport aircraft category version.

The LoCamp design is now produced by one of Aerolab's original dealers, Golden Age Aeroworks, LLC of Richland Center, Wisconsin, United States.

== Design and development ==
The LoCamp is intended to resemble a 1930s style light aircraft. It features a cantilever low-wing, a two-seats-in-tandem open cockpit with polycarbonate windscreens, fixed conventional landing gear and a single engine in tractor configuration.

The aircraft fuselage is made from welded steel tubing, with the wing built from wood or optionally aluminium sheet and its flying surfaces covered in doped aircraft fabric. Its 9.10 m (29.9 ft) span wing employs a NACA 4416 airfoil, has an area of 13.5 m^{2} (145 sq ft) and mounts flaps. The standard engine available is the 110 hp (82 kW) Rotec R2800 four-stroke radial engine, although the 65 hp (48 kW) Walter Mikron MIIIC was under evaluation by the manufacturer.

In 2015 the manufacturer was considering producing a fully assembled special light-sport aircraft version.

== Variants ==
LoCamp
Low wing monoplane model
HiCamp
Parasol wing model, that uses the same fuselage as the LoCamp model
BiCamp
Biplane model, that uses the same fuselage as the LoCamp model

== Specifications (LoCamp) ==
Data from Bayerl and Aerolab

General characteristics

- Crew: one
- Capacity: one passenger
- Length: 6.71 m (22 ft 0 in)
- Wingspan: 9.10 m (29 ft 10 in)
- Height: 2.51 m (8 ft 3 in) (propeller turning)
- Wing area: 13.50 m^{2} (145.3 sq ft)
- Airfoil: NACA 4416
- Empty weight: 385 kg (849 lb)
- Gross weight: 599 kg (1,321 lb)
- Fuel capacity: 120 litres (26 imp gal; 32 US gal)
- Powerplant: 1 × Rotec R2800 seven cylinder, air-cooled, four stroke radial engine, 82 kW (110 hp)
- Propellers: 2-bladed wooden, 1.83 m (6 ft 0 in) diameter

Performance

- Maximum speed: 195 km/h (121 mph, 105 kn)
- Cruise speed: 171 km/h (106 mph, 92 kn)
- Stall speed: 67 km/h (42 mph, 36 kn) with full flaps
- Never exceed speed: 213 km/h (132 mph, 115 kn)
- Range: 732 km (455 mi, 395 nmi)
- g limits: +4.0/-2.0
- Rate of climb: 4 m/s (790 ft/min)
- Wing loading: 44.4 kg/m^{2} (9.1 lb/sq ft)
