= Aero-Club des Cheminots Aerofer =

Aerofer
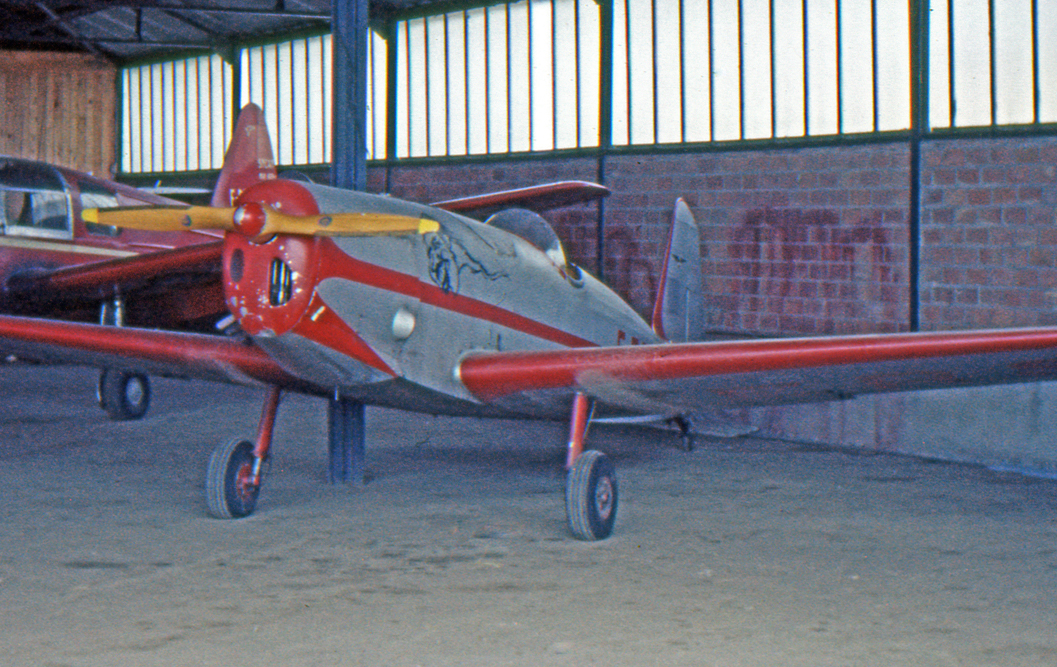
- The sole Aerofer at Guyancourt airfield near Paris in June 1963

General information
- Type: light utility aircraft
- National origin: France
- Manufacturer: Aero-Club des Cheminots
- Designer: Aero-Club des Cheminots
- Status: no longer registered
- Primary user: aero club
- Number built: 1

History
- Introduction date: 1954
- First flight: 1954

The Aero-Club des Cheminots Aerofer was a French-built light utility aircraft of the mid-1950s.

== Design and development ==
The Aerofer was designed and built by members of the Aero-Club des Cheminots as a co-operative project. It was a small single-seat low-winged aircraft. The Aerofer had a two-spar wooden wing with fabric covering. The fuselage was of wooden construction with a combination of fabric and plywood covering. The tailwheel undercarriage was fixed. The aircraft was powered by a 50 h.p. Walter Mikron four-cylinder air-cooled engine built by Aster.

== Operational history ==
The Aerofer was completed in 1954 and was operated until 1964 by the members of the Aero-Club des Cheminots, based at Guyancourt airfield (now closed) to the west of Paris. Its extremely small dimensions meant that it was semi-aerobatic, despite the low-powered engine fitted. Only one example of the design was completed.

By 1965 the aircraft, registered as F-PERS with a Certificat de Navigabilite Restreint d'Aeronef (CNRA) was owned by the Aero-Club Etienne Boileau and based at Fontenay-Tresigny airfield. It was no longer on the CNRA register by March 1983.

== Specifications ==
Data from Green

General characteristics

- Crew: 1
- Capacity: 1
- Wingspan: 26 ft 0 in (7.92 m)
- Gross weight: 1,112 lb (504 kg)
- Powerplant: 1 × Walter Mikron I 4-cyl. inverted air-cooled piston engine, 50 hp (37 kW)

Performance

- Maximum speed: 90 mph (140 km/h, 78 kn)
- Cruise speed: 78 mph (126 km/h, 68 kn)
