= List of aircraft (S) =

This is a list of aircraft in alphabetical order beginning with 'S'.
