= Aeroprogress =

- Industry: Aerospace
- Founded: 1990
- Headquarters: Moscow, Russia
- Products: Military, transport and civilian aircraft

Aeroprogress is a Russian aircraft design company based in Moscow. Aircraft are certified by subsidiary company the ROKS-AERO Aviation Design Bureau.

== Aircraft ==
T-101 Gratch
A passenger and cargo aircraft first flown in 1994 and manufactured by MAPO-MiG, powered by a TVD-10B turboprop.
T-201 Aist
First flown in 1995 a single-engine STOL utility aircraft powered y a Pratt & Whitney Canada PT6-67K turboporop.
T-203 Pchel
An agricultural variant of T-201 with low-mounted wings and spray-bars.
T-411 Aist
Light utility monoplane manufactured by the Khrunichev State Research and Production Space Center. Marketed in the US as the "Aeroprogress T-411 Wolverine".

== Projects ==
T-106
Twin-engined variant of the T-101.
T-110
Lengthened variant of the T-106.
T-112
Cargo variant of the T-106 with a rear ramp.
T-121 Grif
Single-engined high-wing utility aircraft powered by a TVD=10B turboprop.
T-130 Fregat
Amphibious flying-boat with room for 15 passengers.
T-132
Amphibious flying-boat variant of the T106.
T-134
Variant of the T-130 for coast guard use.
T-204 Progress

Twin-engined passenger/cargo aircraft for 9-12 passengers.

T-205
PT6A powered utility aircraft.
T-401 Sokol
Light general-purpose high-wing aircraft.
T-407 Skborets
Single-engined Light utility aircraft, prototype built by Krunichev.
T-433 Flamingo
Five-seat light amphibious flying boat.
T-435 Korvet
Variant of the T-433 with conventional landing gear.
T-501 Strizh
1990s project for a two-seat basic trainer for the Russian Air Force, to be powered by a single OMSK/Glushenkov TVD-10B turboprop. With a length of 9.66 metres (31 ft 8 in) and span of 11.0 metres (36 ft 1 in), estimated takeoff weight was 2,670 kilograms (5,890 lb), maximum speed 570 kilometres per hour (350 mph) and range 1,800 kilometres (1,100 mi). In 1992 three prototypes were under construction by MAPO-MIG, while it was intended that production aircraft would have been built by Khrunichev.
T-504 Borets
A Twin-seat twin-boom design for a combat trainer powered by two TVD-10B turoprops.
T-610 Voyage
STOL multi-purpose single-engined utility aircraft.
T-710 Anaconda
Two-seat all-weather STOL strike aircraft.
T-720
Lightweight two-seat combat aircraft powered by a TVD-1500 turboprop driving a six-bladed pusher propeller.
T-730
Two-seat light attack aircraft and trainer powered by a Soyuz TVD-450 turoprop driving a 6-bladed pusher propeller.
T-752 Shytk
Wing-in-ground-effect strike aircraft powered by two Klimov TV7-117M2 turboprops.
T-910 Kuryer
Single turbofan powered business jet.
