= Aero Ae 03 =

Ae 03

General information
- Type: Reconnaissance
- National origin: Czechoslovakia
- Manufacturer: Aero
- Number built: 1

The Aero Ae 03 was a prototype Czechoslovak military reconnaissance aircraft designed in 1921. It was an ambitious monoplane design, and was completely original to Aero, unlike the firm's licence-built designs from World War I. It was to be equipped with an early turbocharger.

As work progressed, it became clear that the finished product would not meet the Czech Air Force specifications required, as it would be too heavy. Redesign was judged to be impractical, and so construction was halted before the aircraft ever flew.

== Specifications (Ae 03) ==
General characteristics

- Crew: 2
- Wingspan: 8.2 m (26 ft 11 in)
- Wing area: 18.7 m^{2} (201 sq ft)
- Powerplant: 1 × Hispano-Suiza 8Aa V-8 water-cooled piston engine, 134 kW (180 hp)

Armament

- Guns: 1 x machine gun
