= Aerochia LT-1 =

American homebuilt aircraft

LT-1
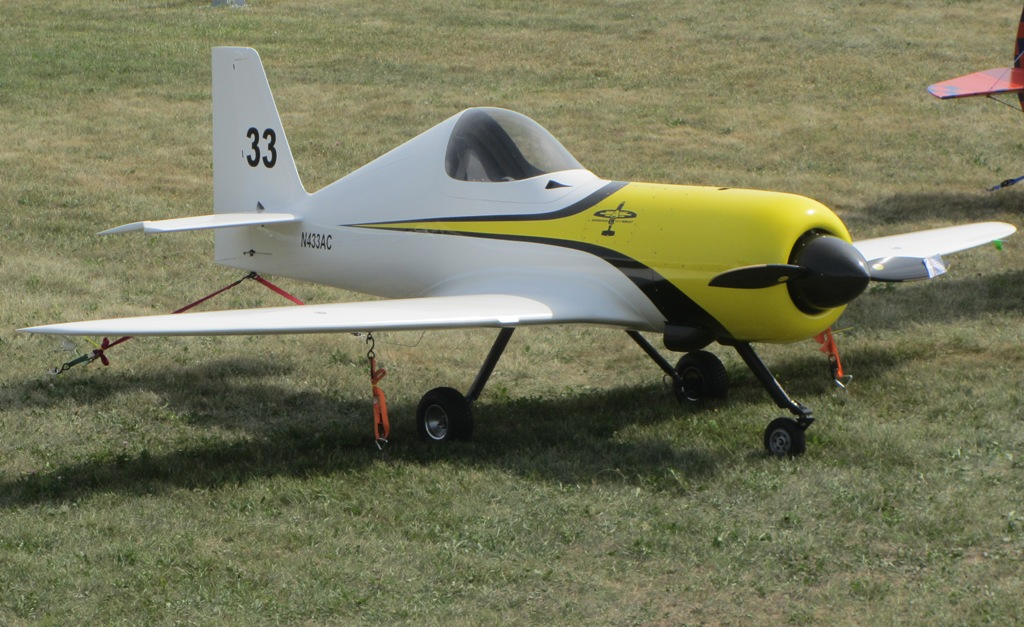
- Aerochia LT-1

General information
- Type: Homebuilt aircraft
- National origin: United States
- Manufacturer: Aerochia
- Designer: Andy Chiavetta, Darryl Greenamyer
- Number built: 1

History
- First flight: May 2010

The Aerochia LT-1 is a single place, composite construction, homebuilt aircraft.

== Design and development ==
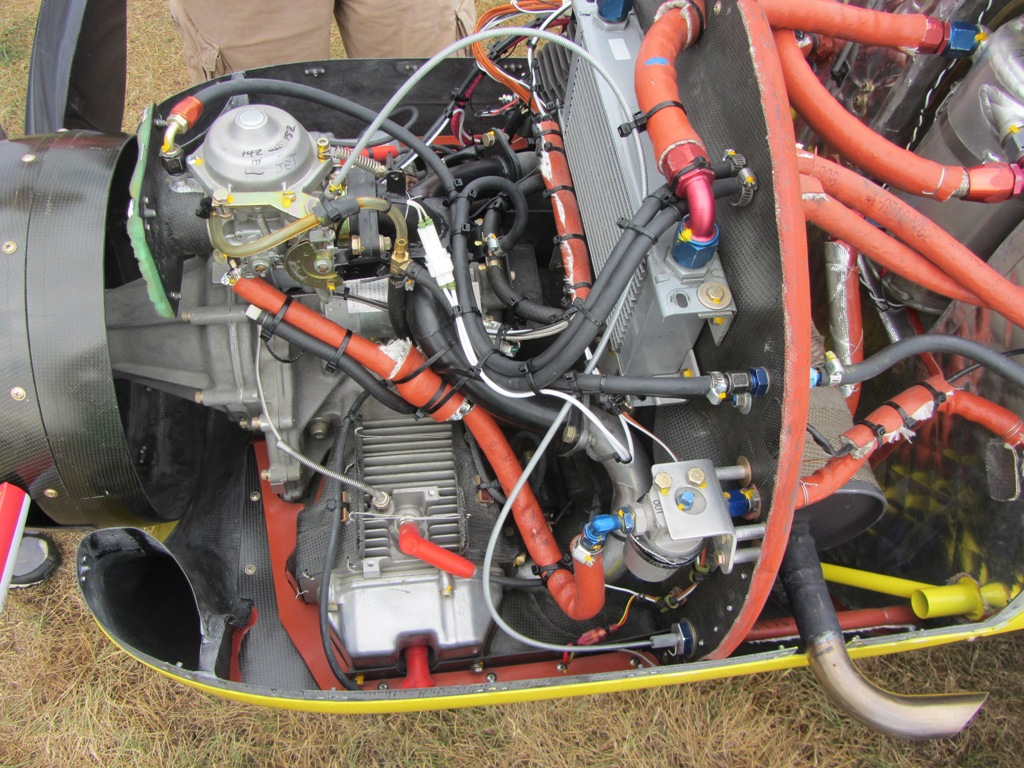
Engine installation

The LT-1 was co-developed by Andy Chiavetta, a composite parts specialist, and air racer, Darryl Greenamyer. The intent was to design a very simple homebuilt aircraft for first-time builders.

The LT-1 is a single seat, low-wing, composite aircraft with tricycle landing gear. The wing uses an elliptical planform.

The first flight was performed in May 2010 piloted by Len Fox.

== Specifications (LT-1) ==
Data from EAA

General characteristics

- Crew: 1
- Length: 15 ft 2 in (4.62 m)
- Wingspan: 21 ft (6.4 m)
- Wing area: 60 sq ft (5.6 m^{2})
- Gross weight: 800 lb (363 kg)
- Fuel capacity: 18 U.S. gallons (68 L; 15 imp gal)
- Powerplant: 1 × HKS 700e Horizontally opposed twin, 60 hp (45 kW)
- Propellers: 2-bladed Aerolux AL-A2L

Performance

- Maximum speed: 140 kn (160 mph, 260 km/h)
