= Aeronáutica Agrícola Mexicana SA =

Aeronáutica Agrícola Mexicana SA (AAMSA) was an aircraft manufacturing company in Mexico from 1971 to 1984.

== History ==
AAMSA was formed in 1971 as a joint venture between Rockwell International (30%) and Industrias Unidas SA (70%) to manufacture Rockwell's range of agricultural aircraft at a factory in Pasteje.

== Products ==
The company's most noteworthy product was the A9B-M Quail, a development of the CallAir A-9, which was produced in 1984. About 40 units were produced.
