= Aéro Services Guépard Guépy =

Guépy

General information
- Type: Microlight cabin monoplane
- National origin: France
- Manufacturer: Aéro Services Guépard

The Aéro Services Guépard Guépy is a French two-seat microlight cabin monoplane designed and built by Aéro Services Guépard to meet the FAI Microlight standard, it is also sold as a kit of parts for amateur construction.

The Guépy is a smaller variant of the Guépard 912 and is a cabin monoplane with a braced high-mounted wing, it has a fixed tricycle landing gear and an enclosed cabin for two sitting in side-by-side configuration. The Guépy is built from welded steel tube with tubular wing spars and aluminium ribs, the Club variant has a fabric covered wing. Although capable of using a range of engines an 80 hp (60 kW) Jabiru 2200 four-stroke or a 64 hp (48 kW) Rotax 582 two-stroke powerplant is normally used.

== Specifications (Guépy Super) ==
Data from World Directory of Leisure Aviation 2005/2006 and 2015/16

General characteristics

- Crew: one
- Capacity: one passenger
- Wingspan: 9.7 m (31 ft 10 in)
- Wing area: 14 m^{2} (150 sq ft)
- Empty weight: 240 kg (529 lb)
- Max takeoff weight: 472.5 kg (1,042 lb)
- Fuel capacity: 50 litres (11 imp gal; 13 US gal)
- Powerplant: 1 × Jabiru 2200 , 60 kW (80 hp)

Performance

- Maximum speed: 200 km/h (120 mph, 110 kn)
- Cruise speed: 170 km/h (110 mph, 92 kn)
- Stall speed: 60 km/h (37 mph, 32 kn)
- Rate of climb: 4 m/s (790 ft/min)
