= Aero Bravo 700 =

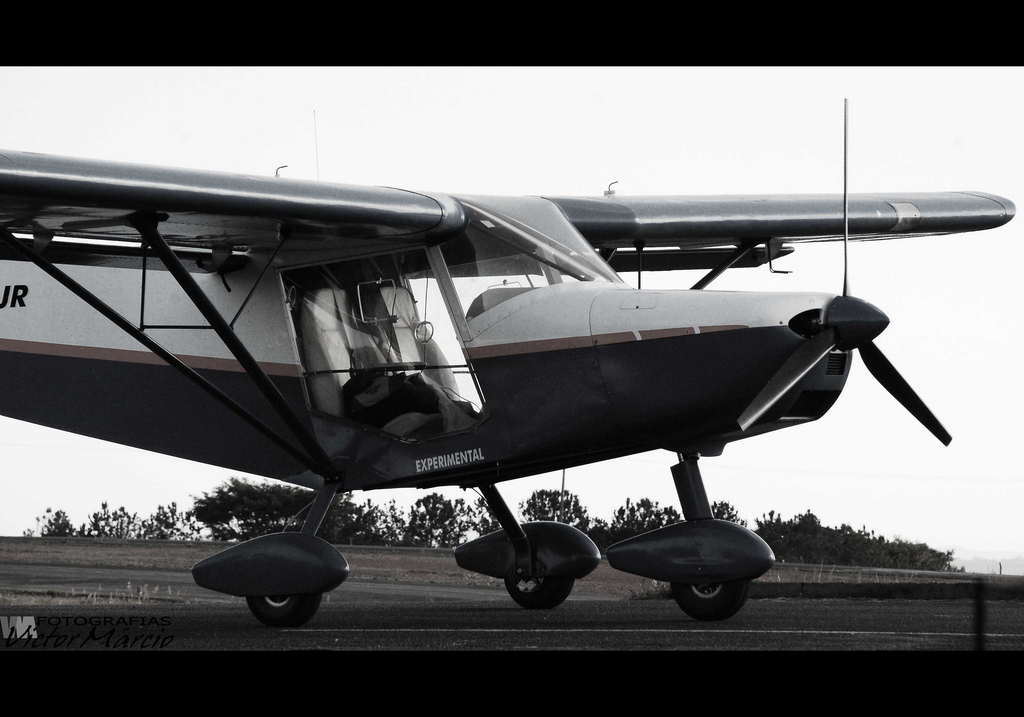

General information
- Type: Light aircraft
- National origin: Brazil
- Manufacturer: Aero Bravo
- Designer: Max Tedesco & Fabio Homem de Carvalho Filho
- Number built: 126

History
- Manufactured: 1996 - 2016
- Developed from: MXP-740

The Bravo 700 is a small, two-seat civil utility aircraft manufactured by Aero Bravo in Brazil, from 1996 to 2016, in both kit and ready-to-fly form. It is a high-wing monoplane of metal construction with fixed tricycle undercarriage and is classed as an ultralight under Brazilian aviation regulations. An agricultural version, the Bravo 700 Agrícola with spraying gear and a chemical tank with a capacity of 140 L (37 US gal) has been developed to flight-testing stage.

The Bravo 700 is a development of the Colombian Aeroandina MXP-740, designed by Max Tedesco.

In the 1990s, Brazilian Engineer Fabio Homem de Carvalho Filho imported a few MXP-740 from Colombia to Brazil. Later, he made an agreement with Max Tedesco and developed his own version, which is the Bravo 700.

One hundred and twenty six units of the Bravo 700 were built in Belo Horizonte, Brazil.

== Specifications (Bravo 700) ==
Data from Bayerl

General characteristics

- Crew: one pilot
- Capacity: 1 passenger
- Length: 6.58 m (21 ft 7 in)
- Wingspan: 9 m (29 ft 6 in)
- Height: 2.1 m (6 ft 11 in)
- Wing area: 13 m^{2} (140 sq ft)
- Empty weight: 270 kg (595 lb)
- Gross weight: 600 kg (1,323 lb)
- Powerplant: × Rotax 912 or 912S 4-cyl. horizontally opposed, liquid and air-cooled, four-stroke, geared piston engine, 60 kW (80 hp)

Performance

- Maximum speed: 190 km/h (120 mph, 100 kn)
- Range: 840 km (520 mi, 450 nmi)
- Service ceiling: 4,000 m (13,000 ft)
- Rate of climb: 5 m/s (980 ft/min)
- Wing loading: 38 kg/m^{2} (7.8 lb/sq ft)
- Power/mass: 0.12 kW/kg (0.07 hp/lb)
