= Adaridi AD 3 =

Wooden aircraft

AD 3
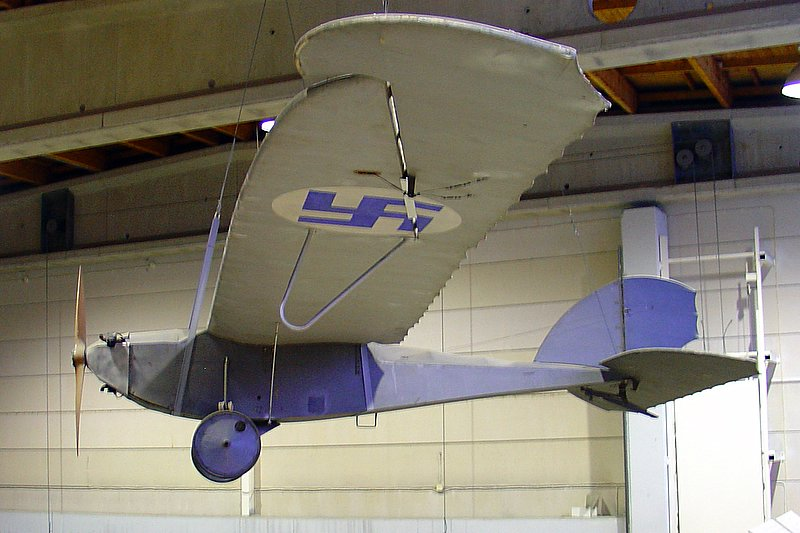
- The Adaridi at the Finnish Aviation Museum.

General information
- Type: Experimental aircraft
- Designer: Adaridi
- Primary user: Finnish Air Force
- Number built: 1

History
- Introduction date: 1924
- First flight: April 17, 1924
- Retired: 1931

Adaridi AD 3 was a wooden aircraft designed by the Russian engineer Boris Adaridin, who lived in Finland. It was a high wing aircraft with a low-powered engine. In 1923, the Finnish Air Force ordered one Adaridi aircraft. The aircraft was not given any official designation code. The maiden flight was on April 17, 1924.

The German ace, Leutnant Emil Thuy (32 victories in World War I) described the aircraft as having mediocre flying qualities, and that the 12 hp (9 kW) engine was inadequate. The aircraft was never meant to become a military aircraft, it was merely an exercise in building an aircraft.

The aircraft was stationed at the fighter squadron at Utti air force base from the summer of 1924 until 1931. It was very rarely flown, as inexperienced pilots could not get the aircraft off the ground.

== Operators ==
Finland

- Finnish Air Force

== Museum aircraft ==
The sole manufactured Adaridi is displayed at the Finnish Aviation Museum.

== Specifications (Adaridi) ==
Data from Thulinista Hornetiin

General characteristics

- Crew: 1
- Length: 5.3 m (17 ft 5 in)
- Wingspan: 11.6 m (38 ft 1 in)
- Max takeoff weight: 260 kg (573 lb)
- Powerplant: 1 × Salmson AD.3 3-cylinder air-cooled radial piston engine, 9 kW (12 hp)
- Propellers: 2-bladed fixed-pitch propeller

Performance

- Maximum speed: 106 km/h (66 mph, 57 kn)

== See also ==
Related lists

- List of military aircraft of Finland
