= Aérostructure Lutin 80 =

Lutin 80

General information
- Type: Single seat motor glider
- National origin: France
- Manufacturer: Aérostructure SARL
- Number built: 2

History
- First flight: 3 May 1983

The Aérostructure Lutin 80, earlier known as the PLM 80 (planeur léger motorisé), is a small, single seat motor glider with a low power pusher configuration engine, designed and built in France in the 1980s. Only two were completed.

== Design and development ==
The Lutin 80 is constructed from glassfibre/epoxy laminates. It is a mid wing monoplane with straight tapered, square tipped wings, set with 4° of forward sweep at 40% chord and 2° of dihedral. There are upper surface airbrakes near mid chord, inboard of the ailerons. The Lutin has a pod and boom style fuselage with a low set boom aft of the wings and a conventional sailplane forward section with a long, one piece, starboard hinged canopy over the single reclined seat. This pod ends abruptly near the wing trailing edge in a cowling over the three cylinder two stroke JPX PAL 640 engine, which delivers 28.5 kW (38 hp) to a foldable three-bladed propeller mounted in pusher configuration.

The slender, constant diameter boom rear fuselage carries a straight tapered empennage of T-tail configuration with a conventional tailplane and elevator. The Lutin has a mechanically retractable monowheel undercarriage, equipped with a disk brake and assisted by small under wing, cantilever strut mounted balancing wheels at about one third span and a semi-recessed tailwheel.

The Lutin 80 flew for the first time on 3 May 1983 and development continued into 1984. A second aircraft was built but there was no further production. In 1994 both completed Lutin 80s were donated to the Conservatoire de l'Air et de L'Éspace d'Aquitaine (C.A.E.A.) where they remain in 2010, though not on general display. The first prototype was registered as F-WAQM but is now deregistered; the second was never registered.

== Specifications ==
Data from Jane's All the World's Aircraft 1984-85. All performance figures estimated.

General characteristics

- Crew: One
- Length: 5.10 m (16 ft 9 in)
- Wingspan: 11.00 m (36 ft 1 in)
- Height: 1.10 m (3 ft 7 in)
- Aspect ratio: 18.91
- Airfoil: Wortmann WX-66S-196-V1
- Empty weight: 155 kg (342 lb)
- Max takeoff weight: 275 kg (606 lb)
- Fuel capacity: 30 L (6.6 Imp gal; 7.9 US gal)
- Powerplant: 1 × JPX PAL 640 three cylinder two stroke, 636 c.c. (38.9 cu in) swept volume., 28.5 kW (38.2 hp)
- Propellers: 3-bladed, 0.94 m (3 ft 1 in) diameter , pusher. Folding glass-fibre blades. Some photographs show a 2-bladed propeller.

Performance

- Maximum speed: 220 km/h (140 mph, 120 kn) powered or gliding in smooth air
- Cruise speed: 170 km/h (110 mph, 92 kn) economical, powered
- Stall speed: 75 km/h (47 mph, 40 kn)
- Never exceed speed: 260 km/h (160 mph, 140 kn) powered
- Range: 600 km (370 mi, 320 nmi) with maximum fuel
- Service ceiling: 5,000 m (16,000 ft) approximately
- Maximum glide ratio: 32 at 95 km/h (41 kn; 59 mph)
- Rate of climb: 6.0 m/s (1,180 ft/min) powered, maximum at sea level
- Rate of sink: 0.7 m/s (140 ft/min)
- Wing loading: 49.29 kg/m^{2} (10.10 lb/sq ft)
- Power/mass: 103 W/kg (0.63 hp/lb)
