= Absolut-Marine Seaplane =

Seaplane
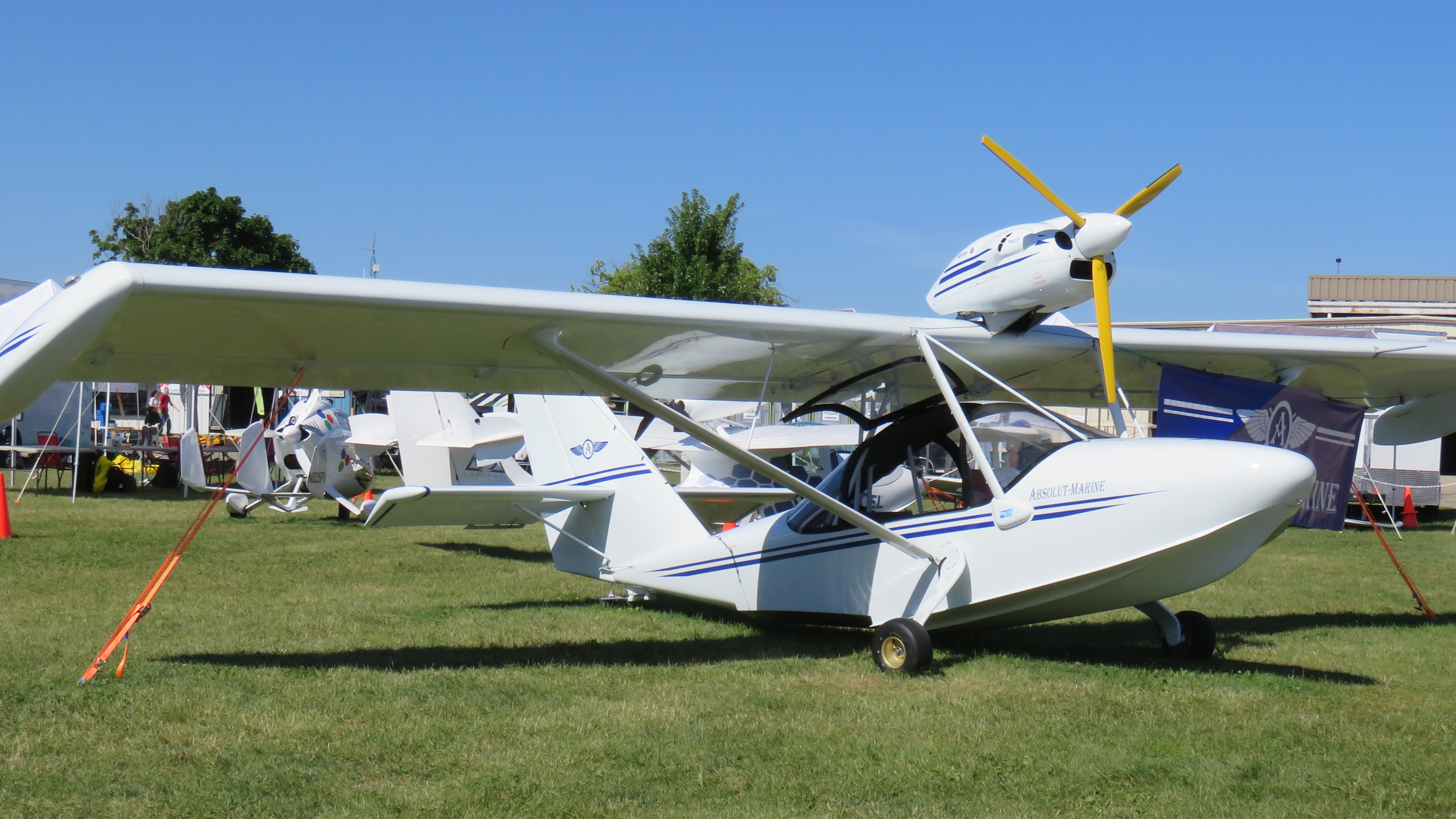
- Absolut-Seaplane on display at EAA AirVenture Oshkosh in 2016

General information
- Type: Seaplane
- National origin: Canada
- Manufacturer: Absolut-Marine

The Absolut-Marine Seaplane is a high-wing single engine seaplane.

== Variants ==
- Seaplane
- Seaplane Twin

== Specifications (variant specified) ==
General characteristics

- Length: 7.05 m (23 ft 2 in)
- Wingspan: 11.8 m (38 ft 9 in)
- Height: 2.7 m (8 ft 10 in)
- Wing area: 16 m^{2} (170 sq ft)
- Empty weight: 420 kg (926 lb)
- Gross weight: 630 kg (1,389 lb)
- Fuel capacity: 50l
- Powerplant: 1 × Rotax 912is horizontally opposed piston

Performance

- Maximum speed: 160 km/h (99 mph, 86 kn)
- Cruise speed: 120 km/h (75 mph, 65 kn)
- Range: 900 km (560 mi, 490 nmi)
- Service ceiling: 2,500 m (8,200 ft)
