= Aero A.42 =

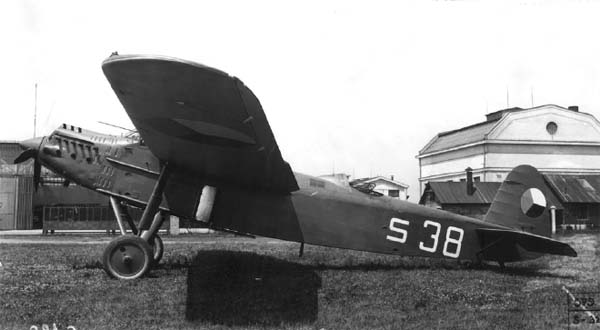

General information
- Type: Bomber
- Manufacturer: Aero
- Status: Prototype
- Primary user: Czechoslovak Air Force
- Number built: 2

History
- Introduction date: 1930
- First flight: 1929
- Retired: 1940

The Aero A.42 was a Czechoslovak bomber aircraft of 1929 that was only ever produced in prototype form. For its day, it was an advanced design, with a sleek monoplane configuration. However, the Czechoslovak Air Force was not satisfied with it for a number of reasons. In particular, the aircraft's take-off and landing runs were felt to be excessively long, and crew complained about the cramped cabin. The air force suggested a set of modifications to Aero, including replacing the wooden wing with a metal one, but Aero discontinued development.

On 20 September 1930, one of the two prototypes set international speed records of 253.42 km/h (157.47 mph; 136.84 kn) over a 1,000 km (620 mi) closed circuit, carrying payloads of 500 kilograms (1,100 lb) and 1,000 kg (2,200 lb).

One prototype was used by the Czechoslovak Air Force until 1938, then by the Slovak Air Force. Probably it was scrapped in 1940.

The A.42 was a single-engined high-wing cantilever monoplane with fixed landing gear.

== Specifications (A.42) ==
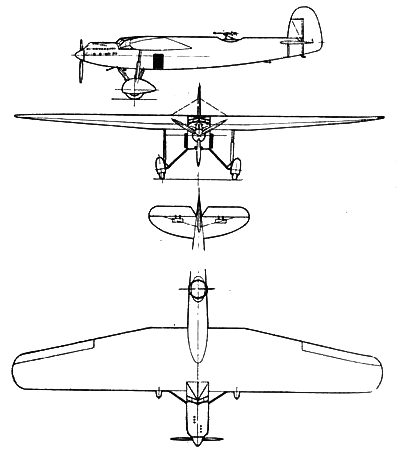
Aero A.42 3-view drawing from l'Aerophile April 1931

Data from

General characteristics

- Crew: three, pilot, observer/bombardier, radio operator/gunner
- Length: 13.80 m (45 ft 3 in)
- Wingspan: 20.82 m (68 ft 4 in)
- Height: 3.40 m (11 ft 2 in)
- Wing area: 59 m^{2} (640 sq ft)
- Empty weight: 2,940 kg (6,482 lb)
- Gross weight: 4,740 kg (10,450 lb)
- Powerplant: 1 × Isotta Fraschini Asso 750 W18 water-cooled piston engine, 600–750 kW (800–1,000 hp)

Performance

- Maximum speed: 270 km/h (170 mph, 150 kn)
- Cruise speed: 250 km/h (160 mph, 130 kn)
- Service ceiling: 7,000 m (23,000 ft)
- Time to altitude: 50 min to 5,000 m (16,000 ft)

Armament

- Guns:
  - 2 × Lewis guns in dorsal rink mount
  - 1 × Lewis gun in ventral position
- Bombs: 200 kg (441 lb) of small bombs
