= Adventure Air Adventurer =

Adventurer

General information
- Type: Homebuilt aircraft
- National origin: United States
- Manufacturer: Adventure Air
- Status: Production completed

The Adventure Air Adventurer is a family of American homebuilt amphibious flying boats that was designed and produced by Adventure Air of Berryville, Arkansas. When it was available the aircraft was supplied as a kit for amateur construction. The company appears to be out of business.

== Design and development ==
The aircraft features a strut-braced high-wing, a four-seat enclosed cockpit, retractable tricycle landing gear, a boat hull with outrigger pontoons, a cruciform tail and a pod-mounted single engine in pusher configuration.

The airframe is made from composites. Its 35.85 ft (10.9 m) span wing mounts flaps and has a wing area of 179.00 sq ft (16.630 m^{2}). The cabin is 46 in (120 cm) wide. The recommended engines vary by model. The factory available options included wing tanks of 60 U.S. gallons (230 L; 50 imp gal), 120 U.S. gallons (450 L; 100 imp gal) or 180 U.S. gallons (680 L; 150 imp gal), dual controls and a pre-assembled wing.

The factory estimated the construction time from the supplied standard kit as 1000 hours, or 400–600 hours from the quick-build kit.

== Operational history ==
By 1998 the company reported that 120 kits had been sold and five aircraft were flying.

By November 2013 ten examples had been registered in the United States with the Federal Aviation Administration.

== Variants ==
Adventurer 2+2
Model with 2+2 seating and a 7 ft (2.13 m) sleeping bunk. The standard engine recommended is the 200 hp (149 kW) Lycoming IO-360 powerplant. The aircraft has an empty weight of 1,800 lb (820 kg) and a gross weight of 3,000 lb (1,400 kg), giving a useful load of 1,200 lb (540 kg). With full fuel of 60 U.S. gallons (230 L; 50 imp gal) the payload is 840 lb (380 kg).

Adventurer 333
Heavier model with higher engine power. The standard engine recommended is the 333 hp (248 kW) Chevrolet HO350 automotive conversion powerplant. The aircraft has an empty weight of 2,000 lb (910 kg) and a gross weight of 3,333 lb (1,512 kg), giving a useful load of 1,333 lb (605 kg). With full fuel of 60 U.S. gallons (230 L; 50 imp gal) the payload is 973 lb (441 kg).

Adventurer Heavy Hauler
The long range and heavy lift version of the design, that was also envisioned for military sales. The standard engine recommended is the 333 hp (248 kW) Chevrolet HO350 automotive conversion powerplant. The aircraft has an empty weight of 2,220 lb (1,010 kg) and a gross weight of 4,400 lb (2,000 kg), giving a useful load of 2,180 lb (990 kg). With full fuel of 60 U.S. gallons (230 L; 50 imp gal) the payload is 1,820 lb (830 kg). The factory available options included wing tanks of 180 U.S. gallons (680 L; 150 imp gal), 216 U.S. gallons (820 L; 180 imp gal) or 260 U.S. gallons (980 L; 220 imp gal).

== Specifications (Adventurer 333) ==
Data from AeroCrafter

General characteristics

- Crew: one
- Capacity: three passengers
- Length: 25 ft 6 in (7.77 m)
- Wingspan: 35 ft 9.96 in (10.9210 m)
- Wing area: 179.00 sq ft (16.630 m^{2})
- Empty weight: 2,000 lb (907 kg)
- Gross weight: 3,333 lb (1,512 kg)
- Fuel capacity: 60 U.S. gallons (230 L; 50 imp gal)
- Powerplant: 1 × Chevrolet HO350 automotive conversion powerplant, 333 hp (248 kW)
- Propellers: 2-bladed metal

Performance

- Maximum speed: 158 mph (254 km/h, 137 kn)
- Cruise speed: 130 mph (210 km/h, 110 kn)
- Stall speed: 54 mph (87 km/h, 47 kn) in the landing configuration
- Range: 850 mi (1,370 km, 740 nmi)
- Service ceiling: 15,000 ft (4,600 m)
- Rate of climb: 1,200 ft/min (6.1 m/s)
