= Sierradyne =

American aircraft manufacturer

- Formerly: Acme Aircraft Co (until 1953)
- Industry: Aerospace
- Founders: Hugh Crawford; Roger Keeney
- Headquarters: Torrance, California, United States

Acme Aircraft Co was an aircraft manufacturer founded by Hugh Crawford and Roger Keeney in Torrance, California. After 1953 the company was known as Sierradyne.

== See also ==
- Acme Sierra
