= Aeroflying Sensation =

French ultralight aircraft

Sensation

General information
- Type: Ultralight aircraft
- National origin: France
- Manufacturer: Espace
- Designer: Jose Verges
- Status: In production

History
- Introduction date: 2007

The Aeroflying Sensation is a French ultralight aircraft, designed by former Airbus engineer Jose Verges and produced by Aeroflying of Saint-André-des-Eaux, Loire-Atlantique. It was introduced at the French Hombuilders Rally in Blois in 2007. The aircraft is supplied as a kit for amateur construction or as a complete ready-to-fly-aircraft.

By 2015 the aircraft was produced by Espace and distribution was handled by Randkar.

== Design and development ==
The Sensation was designed to comply with the Fédération Aéronautique Internationale microlight rules. It features a cantilever low-wing, a two-seats-in-side-by-side configuration enclosed cockpit, a choice of tricycle landing gear or conventional landing gear and a single engine in tractor configuration.

The aircraft is made from riveted aluminium sheet. Its 8.40 m (27.6 ft) span wing employs slotted flaps. Standard engines available are the 80 hp (60 kW) Rotax 912UL and the 100 hp (75 kW) Rotax 912ULS four-stroke powerplants. A variety of kits is available with varying degrees of completion, none of which includes the engine.

The Sensation has a cruise speed of 200 km/h (124 mph) on 80 hp (60 kW) and has a range of 1,200 km (746 mi).

== Specifications (Sensation) ==
Data from Bayerl and Tacke

General characteristics

- Crew: one
- Capacity: one passenger
- Wingspan: 8.40 m (27 ft 7 in)
- Wing area: 10.55 m^{2} (113.6 sq ft)
- Empty weight: 278 kg (613 lb)
- Gross weight: 472.5 kg (1,042 lb)
- Fuel capacity: 110 litres (24 imp gal; 29 US gal)
- Powerplant: 1 × Rotax 912UL four cylinder, liquid and air-cooled, four stroke, 60 kW (80 hp)

Performance

- Maximum speed: 225 km/h (140 mph, 121 kn)
- Cruise speed: 200 km/h (120 mph, 110 kn)
- Stall speed: 58 km/h (36 mph, 31 kn)
- Range: 1,200 km (750 mi, 650 nmi)
- Rate of climb: 5.5 m/s (1,080 ft/min)
- Wing loading: 44.8 kg/m^{2} (9.2 lb/sq ft)
