= Abrial A-260 =

General information
- National origin: France
- Manufacturer: Abrial
- Designer: Georges Abrial

History
- Developed from: Caudron C.260

The Abrial A-260 is a tailless modification of the Caudron C.260 developed by French glider designer Georges Abrial.

== Specifications (Abrial A-260) ==
General characteristics Performance
