= Aero & Tech Nexth =

Italian ultralight aircraft

Nexth
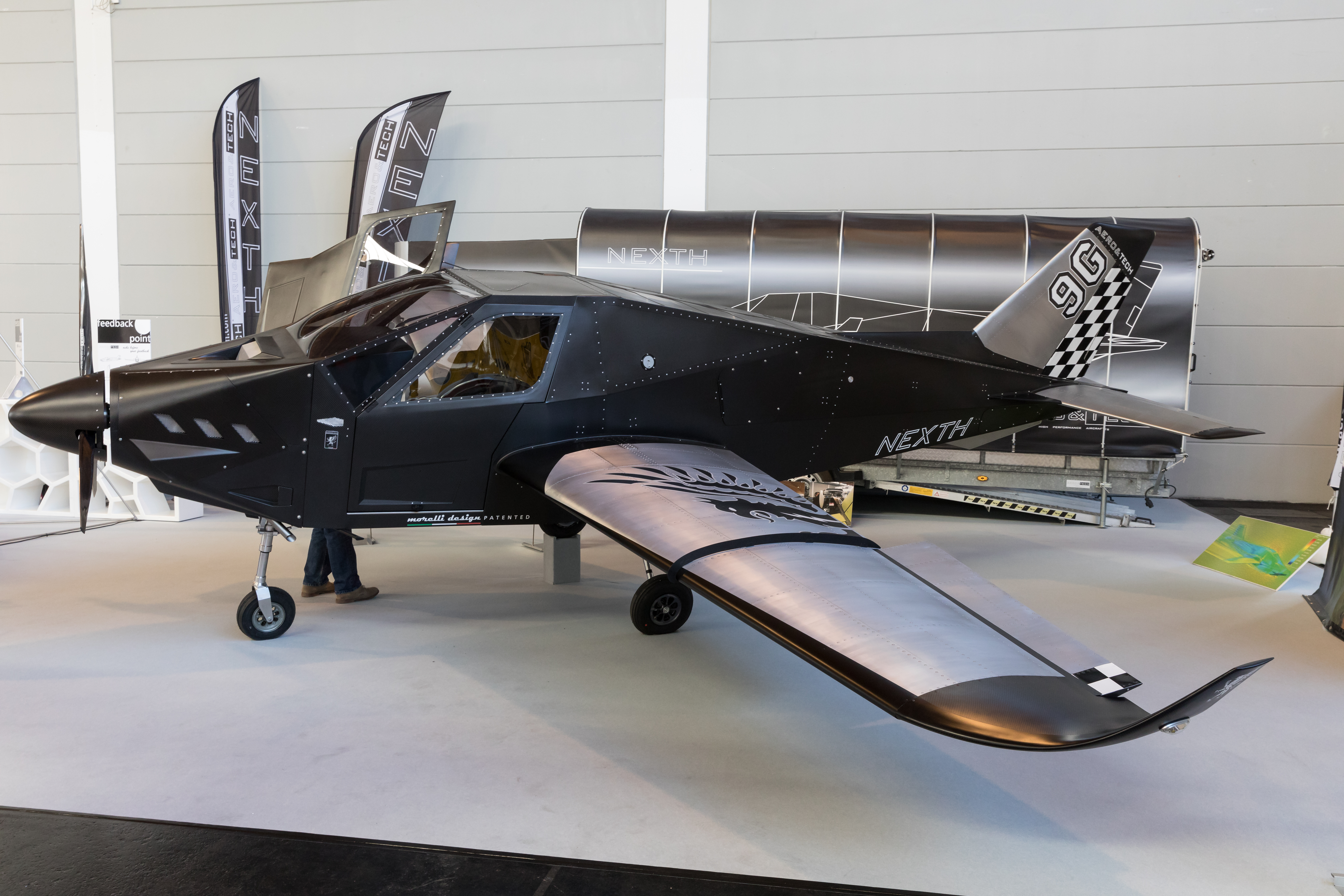
- Nexth 9G

General information
- Type: European FAI microlight class and light-sport aircraft
- National origin: Italy
- Manufacturer: Aero & Tech
- Designer: Morelli Luca
- Status: In production

History
- Introduction date: 2011
- First flight: February 2012

The Aero & Tech Nexth (or sometimes Next-H) is an Italian ultralight aircraft designed by Morelli Luca and produced by Aero & Tech of Fossato di Vico. Introduced at the Aero show held in Friedrichshafen in 2011, the aircraft is intended to be supplied as a complete ready-to-fly aircraft.

== Design and development ==
The Nexth complies with the Fédération Aéronautique Internationale microlight rules. A later version will comply with US light-sport aircraft rules.

The design features a cantilever mid-wing, two seats in side-by-side configuration, retractable tricycle landing gear made from titanium and a single 100 hp (75 kW) Rotax 912ULS four cylinder, liquid and air-cooled, four stroke engine in tractor configuration. Cockpit access is by two gull wing doors hinged at the top. The aircraft was designed to meet aerobatic category requirements, including +9 and -4.5 g.

The aircraft fuselage is an aluminium sheet covered steel space frame, based on Formula One racing construction techniques. Its 7.90 m (25.9 ft) span wing employs winglets and flaps. Fuel is carried in a single fuselage tank and totals 130 litres (29 imp gal; 34 US gal), giving a range of over 1,700 km (1,056 mi).

Marino Boric, writing in the World Directory of Leisure Aviation notes that the Nexth fuselage is an unusual multi-faceted shape reminiscent of stealth fighter design. The prototype was painted black, which adds to the resemblance.

== Specifications (Nexth) ==
Data from Bayerl and Aero & Tech

General characteristics

- Crew: one
- Capacity: one passenger
- Wingspan: 7.90 m (25 ft 11 in)
- Wing area: 9.23 m^{2} (99.4 sq ft)
- Gross weight: 472.5 kg (1,042 lb)
- Fuel capacity: 130 litres (29 imp gal; 34 US gal)
- Powerplant: 1 × Rotax 912ULS four cylinder, liquid and air-cooled, four stroke, 75 kW (101 hp)

Performance

- Maximum speed: 240 km/h (150 mph, 130 kn)
- Cruise speed: 225 km/h (140 mph, 121 kn)
- Stall speed: 65 km/h (40 mph, 35 kn)
- Never exceed speed: 305 km/h (190 mph, 165 kn)
- Range: 1,700 km (1,100 mi, 920 nmi)
- Service ceiling: 5,000 m (16,400 ft)
- g limits: +9/-4.5
- Rate of climb: 7.9 m/s (1,550 ft/min)
