= Levasseur PL.15 =

French torpedo bomber seaplane

PL.15
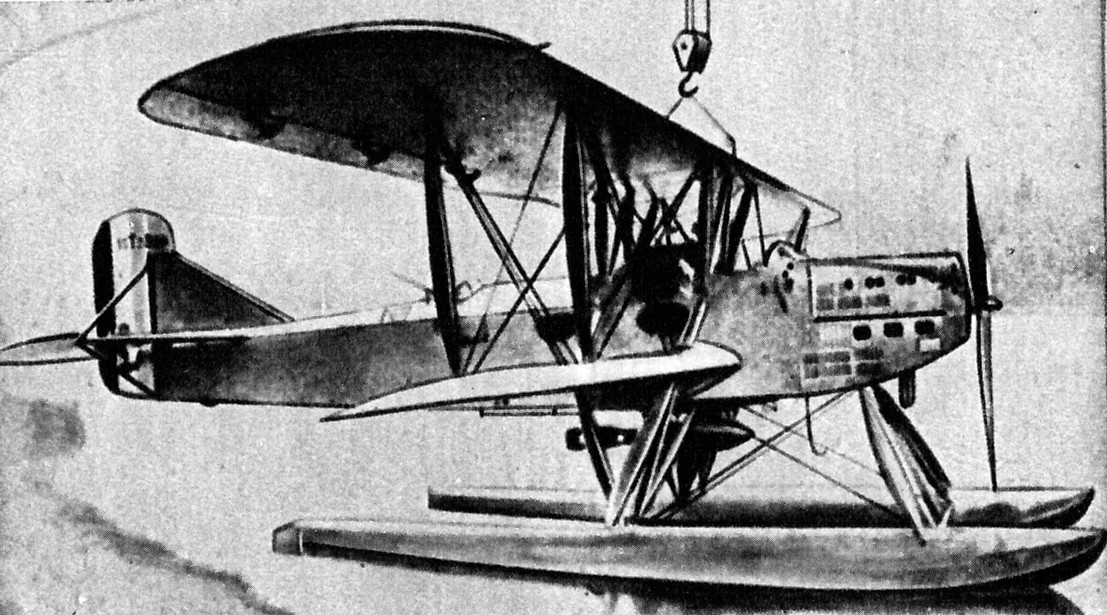

General information
- Type: Seaplane torpedo bomber
- National origin: France
- Manufacturer: Levasseur
- Primary user: Aéronavale
- Number built: 17

History
- Introduction date: 1933
- First flight: October 1932
- Retired: 20 August 1940
- Developed from: Levasseur PL.14

The Levasseur PL.15 was a torpedo bomber seaplane developed in France in the early 1930s. It was a follow-on design to Levasseur's PL.14 that had, in turn, been developed from the carrier-based PL.7. While the PL.14 retained the PL.7's boat-like fuselage (developed as a safety feature for carrier-based aircraft ditching), the PL.15 was a purpose-built seaplane with an all-new, slender fuselage.

The Aéronavale ordered 16 PL.15s for use aboard the seaplane tender Commandant Teste, and purchased and deployed the prototype as well. These were in service from 1933 to 1938, when they were put into storage. The PL.15s were reactivated with the outbreak of war in September 1939, and were used for anti-submarine patrol along France's Atlantic coast.

== Variants ==
- PL.15 – main production version (17 built)
  - PL.151 – radical inverted sesquiplane redesign with full-size mid-wing mainplane and small secondary plane mounted above fuselage (not built)
  - PL.154 – landplane version (1 converted from PL.15)

== Units using this aircraft ==
France

- Aéronavale
  - Escadrille 7B2
  - Escadrille 3S6

== Specifications ==
General characteristics

- Crew: Three
- Length: 12.85 m (42 ft 2 in)
- Wingspan: 18.00 m (59 ft 1 in)
- Height: 5.10 m (16 ft 9 in)
- Wing area: 74.5 m^{2} (802 sq ft)
- Empty weight: 2,835 kg (6,237 lb)
- Gross weight: 4,500 kg (9,900 lb)
- Powerplant: 1 × Hispano-Suiza 12Nb , 480 kW (650 hp)

Performance

- Maximum speed: 208 km/h (130 mph, 110 kn)
- Cruise speed: 181 km/h (113 mph, 98 kn)
- Range: 750 km (470 mi, 410 nmi)
- Service ceiling: 4,500 m (14,800 ft)

Armament

- 1 × trainable, rearward-firing machine gun in rear cockpit
- 1 × 400 mm or 450 mm torpedo

== See also ==
Related lists

- List of Interwar military aircraft
- List of aircraft of World War II
