= Pierre Levasseur (aircraft builder) =

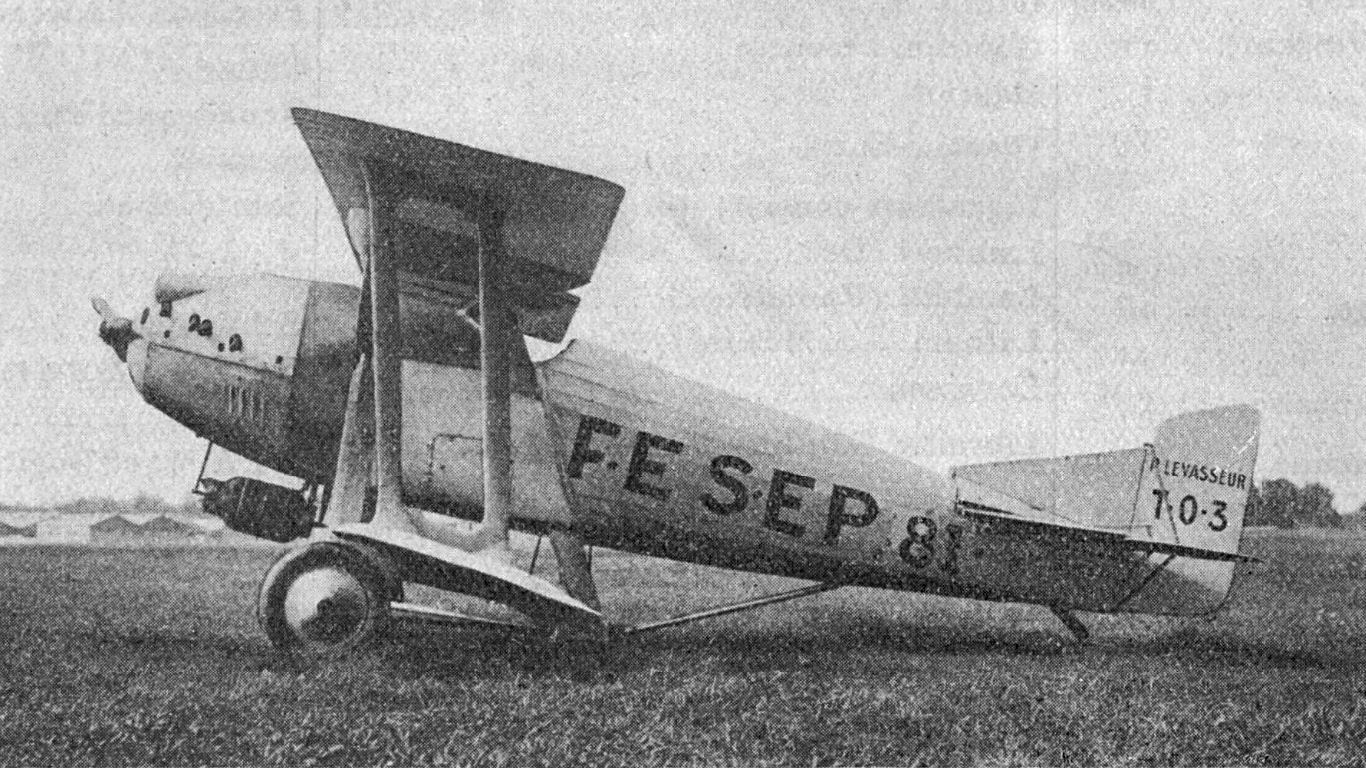
Levasseur PL.1 photo from L'Aéronautique December,1922

Pierre Georges Albert Levasseur (July 16, 1890 in Paris – August 2, 1941 in Paris) was a French aircraft and component maker. He set up his company Société Pierre Levasseur Aéronautique, always referred to simply as Levasseur in Paris in 1910, beginning by making propellers. In 1913 he began building aircraft designed by others. He then began to design his own, the majority of which were single-engine biplanes for French Naval Aviation. He also ran a flying school, where the chief pilot of his school was François Denhaut (1877–1952), notable for designing the first flying boat. Georges Abrial (1898 – 1970), an early French aerodynamicist, also worked with Levasseur to produce the Levasseur-Abrial A-1.

== Sociéte Pierre Levasseur Aéronautique ==
Models created included:

- Levasseur-Abrial A-1, 1922 glider
- Levasseur PL.1, 1922, three seat tourer
- Levasseur PL.2, naval biplane torpedo bomber
- Levasseur PL.4, carrier-based reconnaissance aircraft
- Levasseur PL.5, carrier-based fighter
- Levasseur PL.6, 1926 two-seat fighter aircraft
- Levasseur PL.7, torpedo bomber
- Levasseur PL.8, special model created for the Orteig Prize (see The White Bird), a famous aircraft which disappeared in 1927 during an attempt to make the first non-stop transatlantic flight between Paris and New York City
- Levasseur PL.10, carrier-based reconnaissance aircraft
- Levasseur PL.14, 1920s seaplane torpedo bomber
- Levasseur PL.15, 1930s seaplane torpedo bomber
- Levasseur PL.200, 1935, observation seaplane
- Levasseur PL.400, 1939, artillery observation / liaison aircraft
