= Levasseur PL.8 =

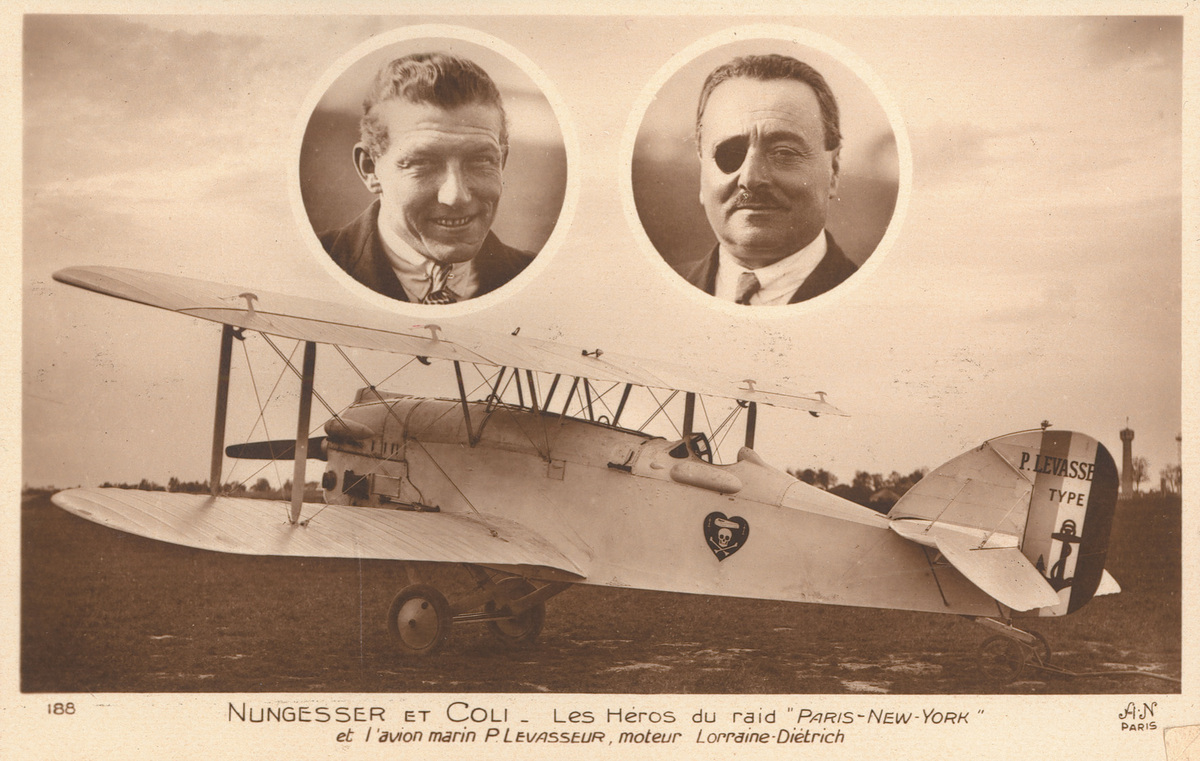
- 1927 postcard showing L'Oiseau Blanc, with pictures of Nungesser (left) and Coli (right)

General information
- Type: Long-range aircraft [for record attempt]
- National origin: France
- Manufacturer: Pierre Levasseur Company
- Primary user: Charles Nungesser, François Coli
- Number built: 2

History
- Introduction date: 1927
- First flight: 1927
- Developed from: Levasseur PL.4

The Levasseur PL.8 was a single engine, two-seat long-distance record-breaking biplane aircraft modified from an existing Levasseur PL.4 carrier-based reconnaissance aircraft produced in France in the 1920s. Levasseur built the aircraft in 1927, specifically for pilots Charles Nungesser and François Coli for a transatlantic attempt to win the Orteig Prize. Only two examples of the type were built, with the first PL.8-01 named L'Oiseau Blanc (The White Bird), that gained fame as Nungesser and Coli's aircraft.

== Design and development ==
At the Pierre Levasseur Company in Paris, Nungesser and Coli, working closely with Chief Engineer Émile Farret and production manager Albert Longelot, assisted in the design of the new Levasseur PL.8 biplane. Based on the PL.4 developed for the Aéronavale to operate from the French aircraft carrier Béarn, the PL.8 was a conventional single-bay wood and fabric-covered biplane that carried a crew of two in a side-by-side open cockpit.

Major modifications included the reinforcement of the plywood fuselage, removing two of the forward cockpits with the main cockpit widened to allow Nungesser and Coli to sit side-by-side. The wingspan was also increased to approximately 15 m (49 ft). In adding two additional fuel tanks mounted aft of the firewall, the three fuel tanks held a total of 4,025 litres

2,924 kg (1,064 US Gal, 886 imp Gal) 6,442 lb of gasoline.

The PL.8 also incorporated several safety features in case of ditching at sea. Apart from small floats attached directly to the undersides of the lower wing, the main units of the fixed tailskid undercarriage could be jettisoned on takeoff in order to reduce the aircraft's weight. The underside of the fuselage was given a boat-like shape and made watertight for a water landing. Nungesser and Coli's plan was to make a water landing in New York in front of the Statue of Liberty

A single W-12ED Lorraine-Dietrich 340 kilowatts (460 hp) engine was used with the cylinders set in three banks spaced 60° apart from one another, similar to the arrangement used in Napier engines. The engine was tested to ensure it would last the entire flight and was run for over 40 hours while still in the Parisian factory.

The aircraft christened L'Oiseau Blanc (Note: In the United States, L'Oiseau Blanc was commonly known as "The White Bird".) was painted white (Note: Nungesser had the aircraft painted white to aid in recognition if forced down at sea.) and had the French tricolor markings, with Nungesser's personal World War I flying ace logo: a skull and crossbones, candles and a coffin, on a black heart. The biplane carried no radio (Note: Period radios were considered too unreliable to be worth the extra weight.) and relied only on celestial navigation, a specialty of Coli from his previous flights around the Mediterranean.

In 1928, a second PL.8 was built, nicknamed L'Oiseau Blanc n°2 equipped with a Hispano-Suiza 12M 375 kW (500 hp) engine. Flown in 1928, the PL.8-02 was intended as a long-range record breaker but modified as an air mail carrier. On 20 December 1929, the second PL.8-02, registered F-AJKP to Cie Generale Aeropostale and based at Dakar while flown by pilot Henry Delaunay, was badly damaged when it hit a pothole on landing at Istres and not repaired.

== Operational history ==
In April 1927, the first PL.8 was shipped from the factory for Nungesser to begin a series of proving tests to determine aircraft performance. Most of the flights were conducted around Villacoublay and Chartres. Although full fuel loads were never carried, during one flight, he reached a speed of 207 kilometres per hour (129 mph) and flight elevation of 4,900 m (16,100 ft). Once the tests were complete, L'Oiseau Blanc was prepared for its record flight.

=== Transatlantic flight ===
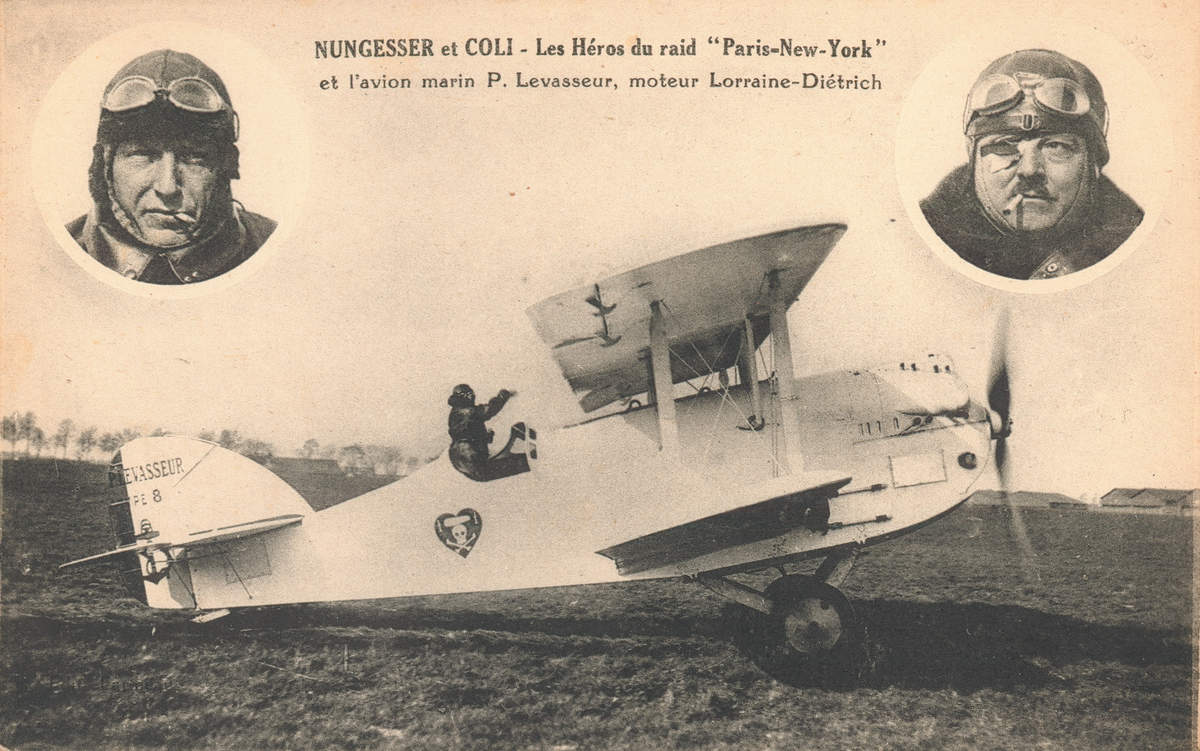
'L'Oiseau Blanc during the flight tests, in April 1927

L'Oiseau Blanc took off at 5:17 a.m. 8 May 1927 from Le Bourget Field in Paris, heading for New York. The biplane weighed 5,000 kg (11,000 lb) on takeoff, extremely heavy for a single-engined aircraft. The intended flight path was a great circle route, which would have taken them across the English Channel, over the southwestern part of England and Ireland, across the Atlantic to Newfoundland, then south over Nova Scotia, to Boston, and finally to a water landing in New York.

L'Oiseau Blanc had been carrying a sizable load of fuel, 4,000 litres (1,100 US gal), which would have given them approximately 42 hours of flight time. Crowds of people gathered in New York to witness the historic arrival, with tens of thousands of people crowding Battery Park in Manhattan to have a good view of the Statue of Liberty, where the aircraft was scheduled to touch down. After their estimated time of arrival had passed, with no word as to the aircraft's fate, it was realized that the aircraft had been lost.

Rumors circulated that L'Oiseau Blanc had been sighted along its route, in Newfoundland, or over Long Island, and despite the launch of an international search, after two weeks, further search efforts were abandoned.

As of 2008, the landing gear is the only confirmed part of the L'Oiseau Blanc remaining, and is on display at the Musée de l'Air et de l'Espace (French Air and Space Museum), in Le Bourget airport in Paris, the location from which L'Oiseau Blanc took off.

== Operators ==
France

- Cie Generale Aeropostale

== Specifications: Levasseur Pl.8-01 L'Oiseau Blanc ==
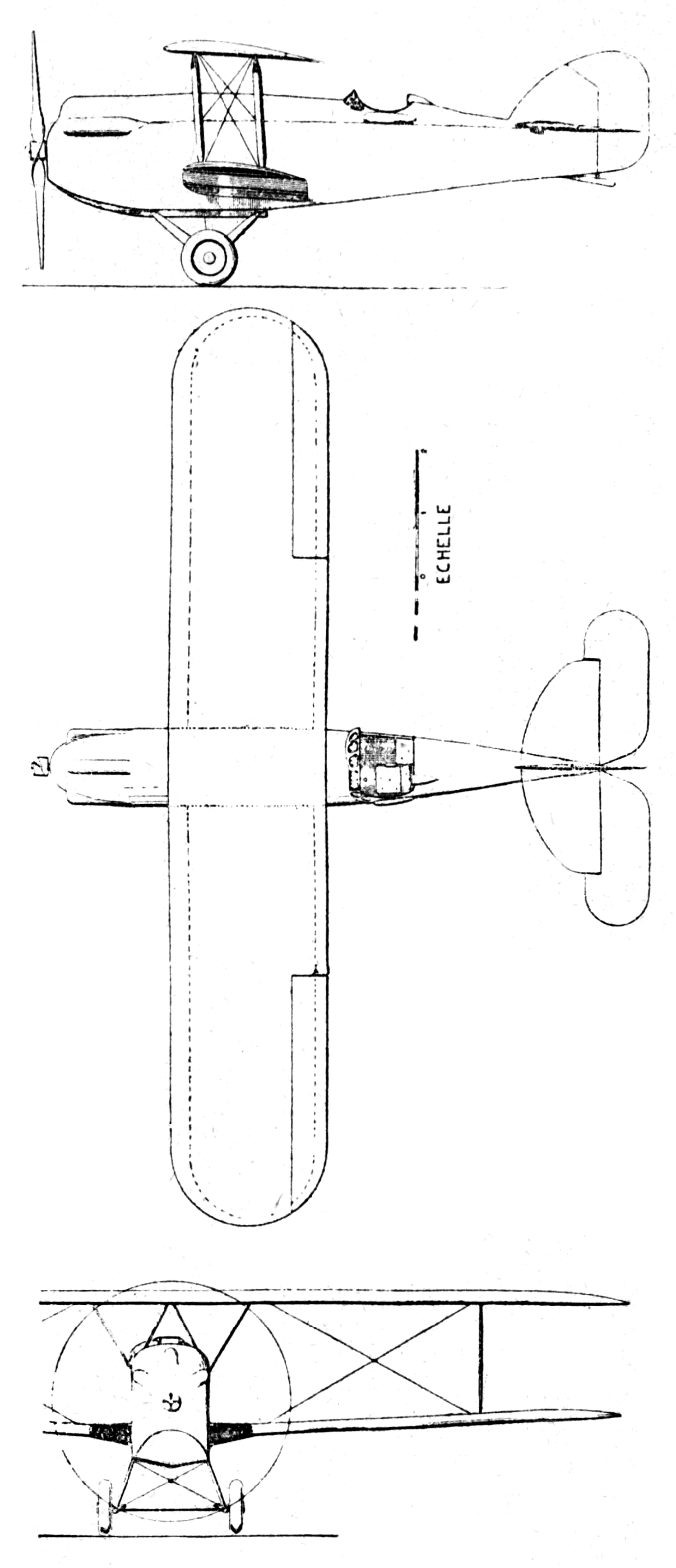
Levasseur PL.8 3-view drawing from L'Aérophile June,1927

General characteristics

- Crew: 2
- Length: 9.75 m (32 ft 0 in)
- Wingspan: 15 m (49 ft 3 in)
- Height: 3.89 m (12 ft 9 in)
- Wing area: 60.9 m^{2} (656 sq ft)
- Empty weight: 1,905 kg (4,200 lb)
- Gross weight: 5,000 kg (11,023 lb)
- Powerplant: × Lorraine 12Ed Courlis W-12 water-cooled piston engine, 340 kW (460 hp)

Performance

- Maximum speed: 193 km/h (120 mph, 104 kn)
- Cruise speed: 165 km/h (103 mph, 89 kn)
- Range: 7,000 km (4,300 mi, 3,800 nmi)
- Endurance: 40 hours
- Service ceiling: 7,000 m (23,000 ft)

== See also ==
- History of aviation
- Transatlantic flight
