= French Naval Aviation =

Aviation branch of the French Navy

- Force maritime de l'aéronautique navale
- French Fleet Air Arm Roundel
- Founded: 20 March 1912
- Country: France
- Branch: French Navy
- Type: Naval aviation
- Size: 6,800 personnel 178 aircraft
- Nicknames: Sky Navy 'La Marine du Ciel
- Motto: Honneur, patrie, valeur, discipline

Commanders
- Current commander: Contre-amiral Eric Janicot

French Naval Aviation (often abbreviated in French to: Aéronavale (contraction of Aéronautique navale), or Aviation navale, or more simply l'Aéro) is the naval air arm of the French Navy. The long-form official designation is Force maritime de l'aéronautique navale. Born as a fusion of aircraft carrier squadrons and the naval patrol air force, the Aéronavale was created in 1912. The force is under the command of a flag officer officially titled Admiral of Naval Aviation (ALAVIA) with his headquarters at Toulon naval base. It has a strength of around 6,800 military and civilian personnel. It operates from four airbases in Metropolitan France and several detachments in foreign countries or French overseas territories. Carrier-borne pilots of the French Navy do their initial training at Salon-de-Provence Air Base after which they undergo their carrier qualification with the US Navy.

== Structure ==
Active bases of the French naval air arm (status 2013)

Immediately after the end of World War II, the Aeronavale only had Supermarine Seafire Mk.III (Flottille 1F) and Douglas SBD Dauntless dive bombers (Flotilles 3F et 4F).

=== Components ===
The flight personnel of the French Navy falls into three categories: fighter aviation, fixed-wing aviation and helicopter aviation.

Operationally the French Naval Aviation has four components:

- Embarked Air Group (Le Groupe aérien embarqué) of the aircraft carrier Charles de Gaulle: Rafale M, E-2C Hawkeye
- Naval Patrol and Maritime Surveillance Aviation (l'Aviation de patrouille et de surveillance maritime): Atlantique 2, Falcon 50, Falcon 200
- Shipborne and Shore-based Helicopters (Les hélicoptères embarqués et basés à terre): Dauphin, Panther, Caïman Marine
- Support Aviation (l'Aviation de soutien): Falcon 10, EMB-121 Xingu, SR20, Cap-10, Dauphin, EC120 Colibri

=== Units ===
Operational squadrons are known as Flottilles and normally consist of 12 aircraft :

- 1F to 10F are carrier based anti-submarine squadrons
- 11F to 20F are fighter and attack squadrons
- 21F to 30F are maritime patrol squadrons
- 31F to 39F are helicopter squadrons

Shore-based training and transport squadrons are known as Escadrilles de Servitude :

- 1S to 19S are communications squadrons
- 20S to 29S are helicopters squadrons
- 50S to 59S are training squadrons

Squadron	Insignia	Type	Aircraft	Base	Role	Notes
Embarked Air Group (Le Groupe aérien embarqué)
4F		Fixed wing	E-2C Hawkeye	Lann Bihoué	Carrier airborne early warning	
11F		Fixed wing	Rafale M	Landivisiau	Strike fighter	
12F		Fixed wing	Rafale M	Landivisiau	Strike fighter	
17F		Fixed wing	Rafale M	Landivisiau	Strike fighter	Ended
		Rotary	Eurocopter AS365 Dauphin	Hyères	Plane guard	Not part of the GAE. Charles de Gaulle set sail on cruises with two Dauphin helicopters from 35F.
Naval Patrol and Maritime Surveillance Aviation (l'Aviation de patrouille et de surveillance maritime)
21F		Fixed wing	Atlantique 2	Lann Bihoué	Anti-submarine warfare / Naval patrol	Detachments at Dakar and Djibouti.
23F		Fixed wing	Atlantique 2	Lann Bihoué	Anti-submarine warfare / Naval patrol	
24F		Fixed wing	Falcon 50 M	Lann Bihoué	Maritime surveillance / Search and rescue	
25F		Fixed wing	Falcon 200 Guardian	GAM Faa'a	Maritime surveillance / Search and rescue	Detachment at Nouméa.
Shipborne and Shore-based Helicopters (Les hélicoptères embarqués et basés à terre)
31F		Rotary	NH90 Caïman	Hyères	Search and rescue	
32F		Rotary	Airbus Helicopters H160M Guépard	Lanvéoc		Previously used SA321G Super Frelon.
33F		Rotary	NH90 Caïman	Lanvéoc	Anti-submarine warfare / Search and rescue	
34F		Rotary	Eurocopter AS365 Dauphin/NH90 Caïman	Lanvéoc	Anti-submarine warfare	Disbanded 4 September 2020. Planned to re-activate in 2021 operating leased SA365M3 Dauphins from Heli-Union and NHV as temporary equipment. To convert to NH90 Caïman.
35F		Rotary	Eurocopter AS365 Dauphin SPI	Hyères	Search and rescue	Detachments at La Rochelle, Le Touquet-Paris-Plage and Faa'a. Uses additional leased AS365N3 from Heli-Union.
36F		Rotary	Eurocopter AS565 Panther	Hyères	Small ship flights	
Support Aviation (l'Aviation de soutien)
10S		Rotary/ Fixed wing/UAV	Schiebel S-100 Serval	Hyères	Experimental	Aviation and airborne weapons research and development, evaluation at several locations.
22S		Rotary	Dauphin, EC120 Colibri	Lanvéoc	Rotary operational training / Liaison	
28F		Fixed wing	Embraer Xingu	Lann Bihoué	Naval patrol and maritime surveillance operational training / Utility / Liaison	
50S		Fixed wing	SR20 and CAP-10	Lanvéoc	Elementary flying training	
57S		Fixed wing	Pilatus PC-24	Landivisiau	Combat aviation operational training	Replaced former Falcon 10MER aircraft in 2026

Insignia
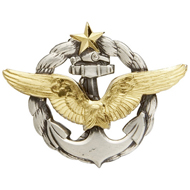
Insignia of pilots of Naval aviation

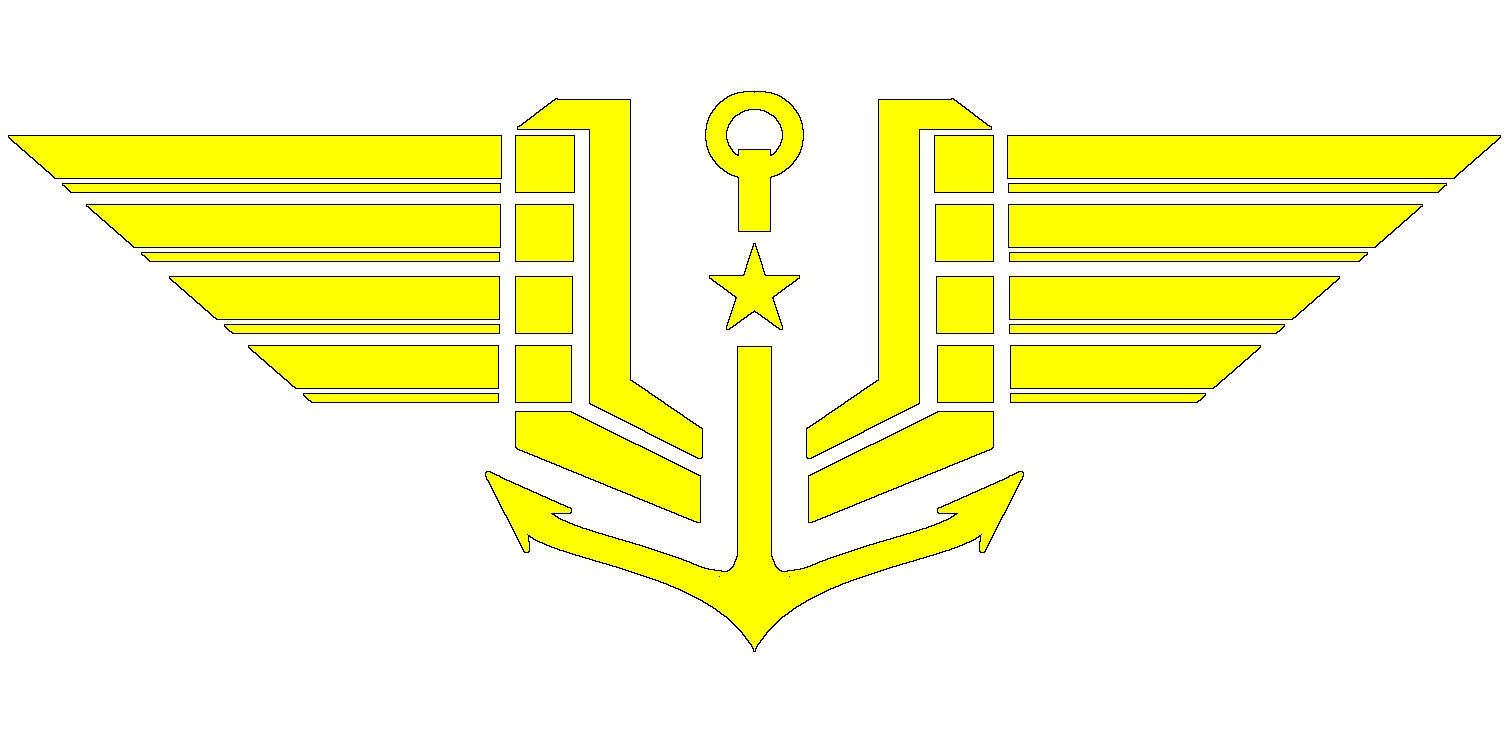
Arm insignia of personnel of Naval aviation
Views of various aircraft previously or currently in service
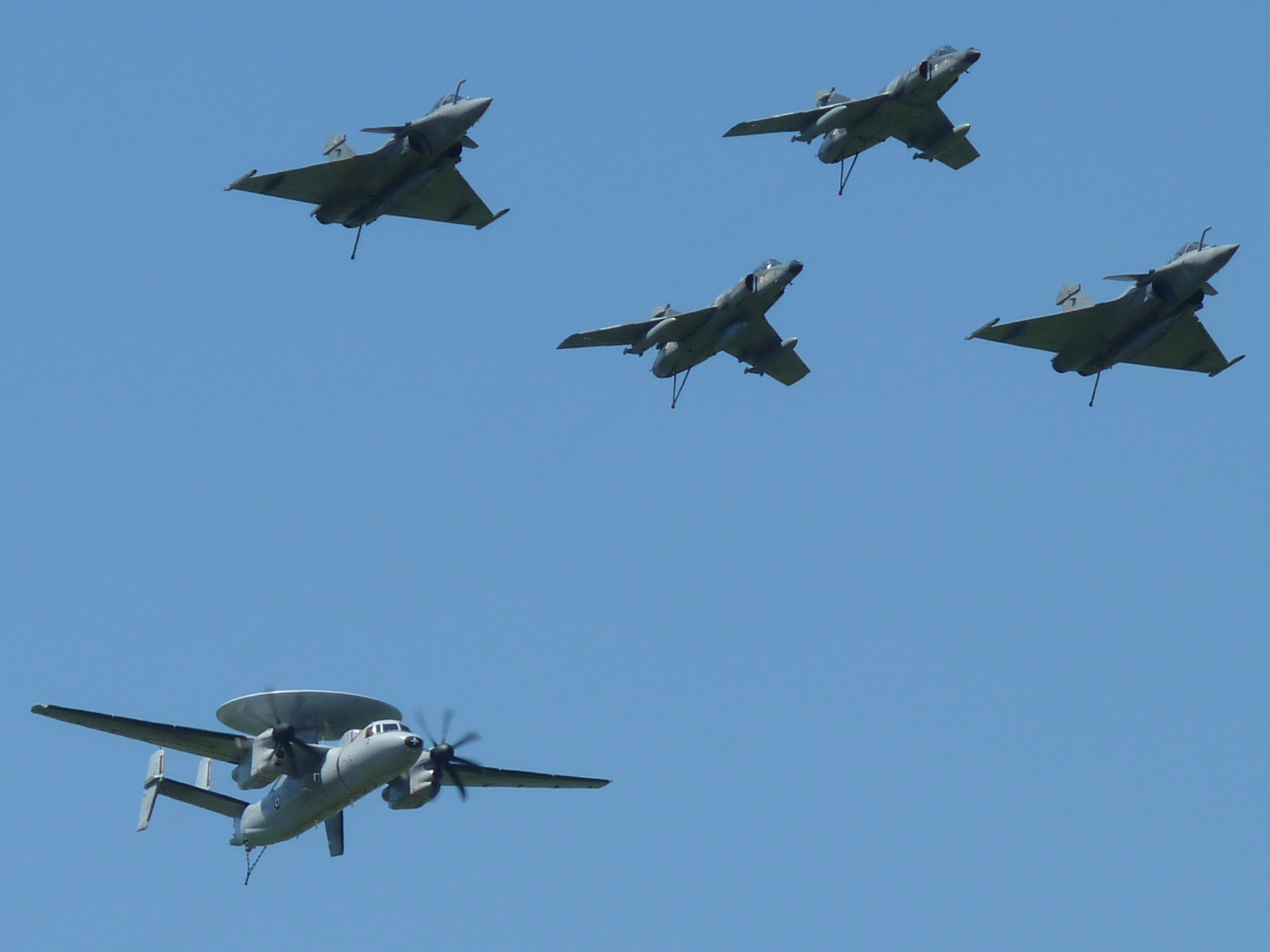
Two Super Étendard, two Rafale fighters and an E-2C Hawkeye at the 2010s French Naval Aviation Centenary Airshow

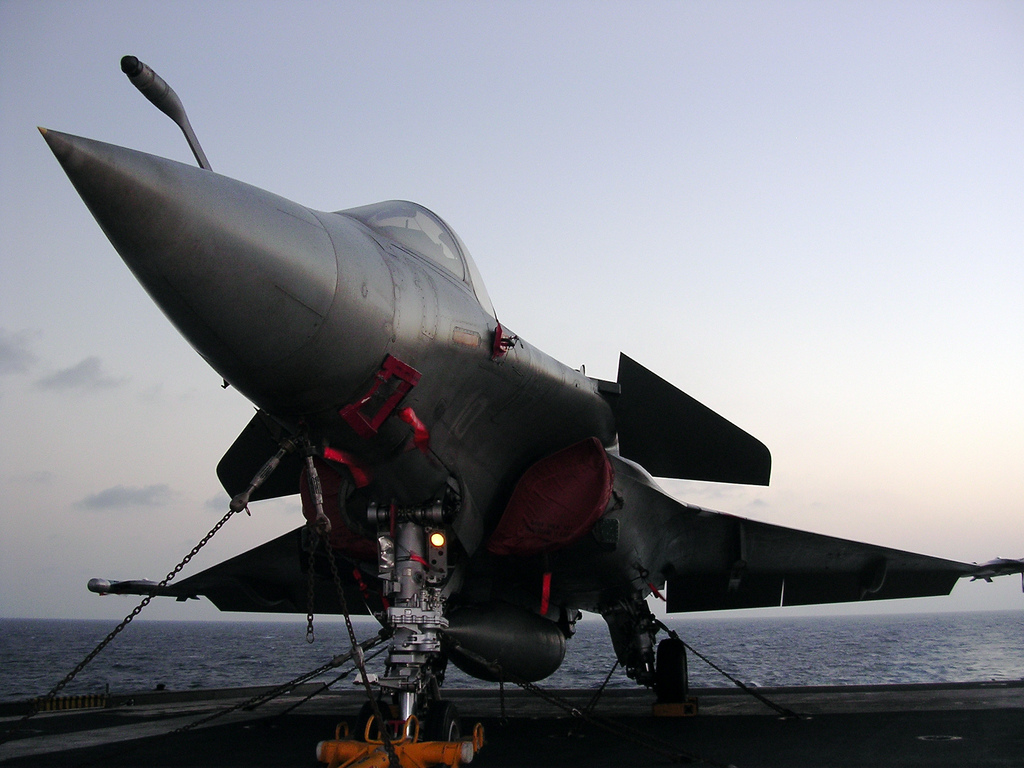
Rafale fighter on the flight deck of Charles de Gaulle at dawn

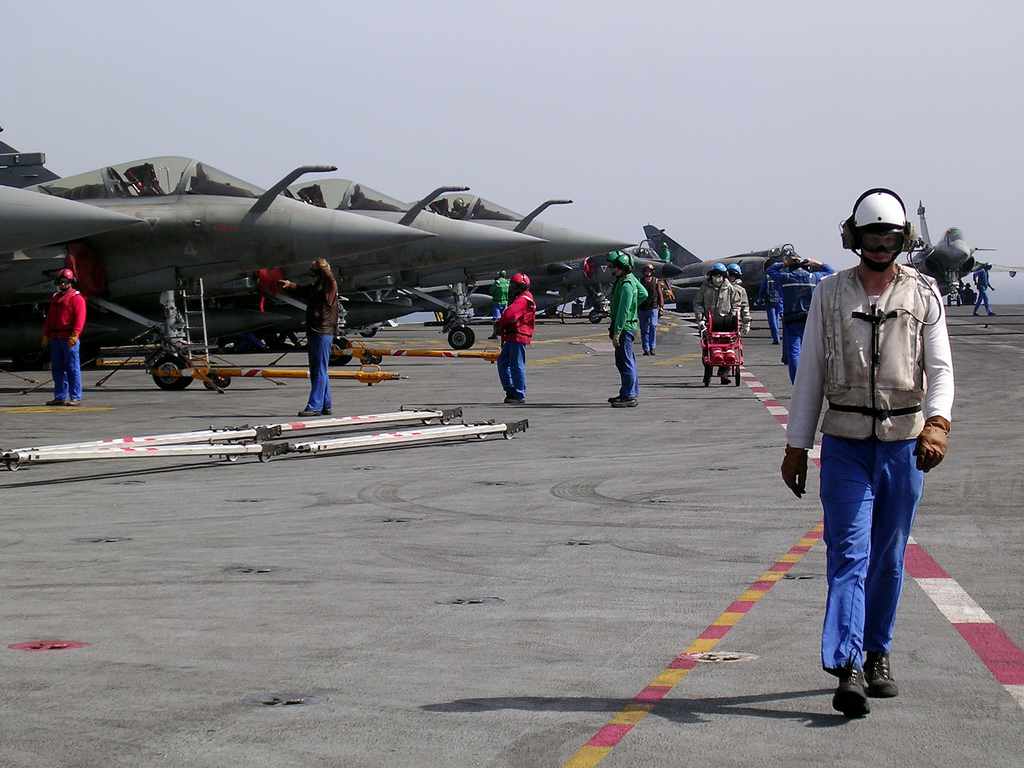
Rafale fighters on the flight deck of the aircraft carrier Charles de Gaulle

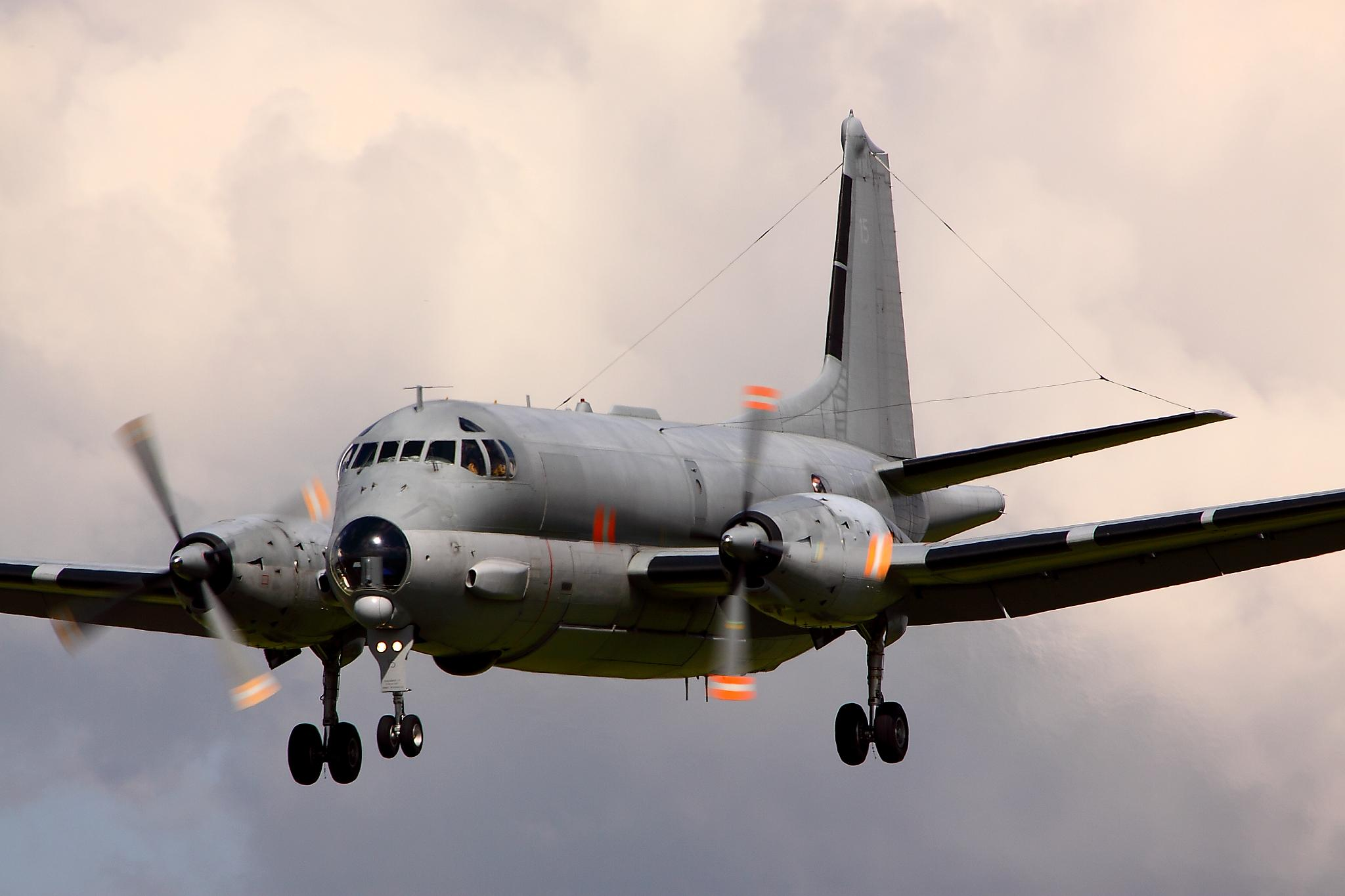
Atlantique 2 maritime patrol aircraft

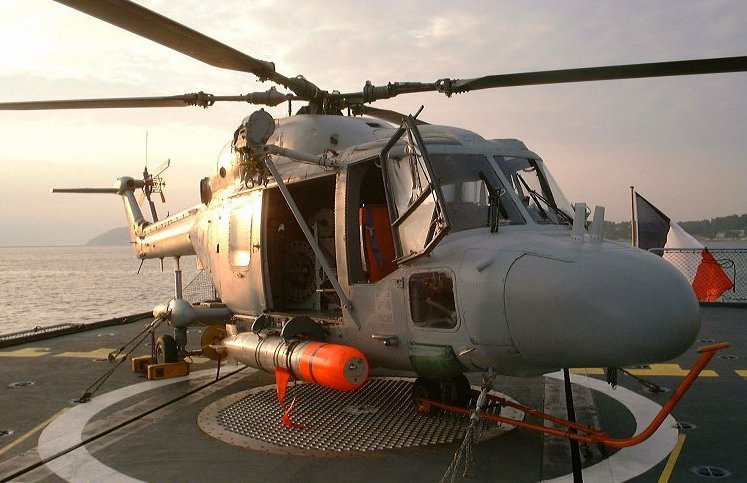
Lynx WG13 helicopter armed with a Mk46 torpedo on the deck of a frigate

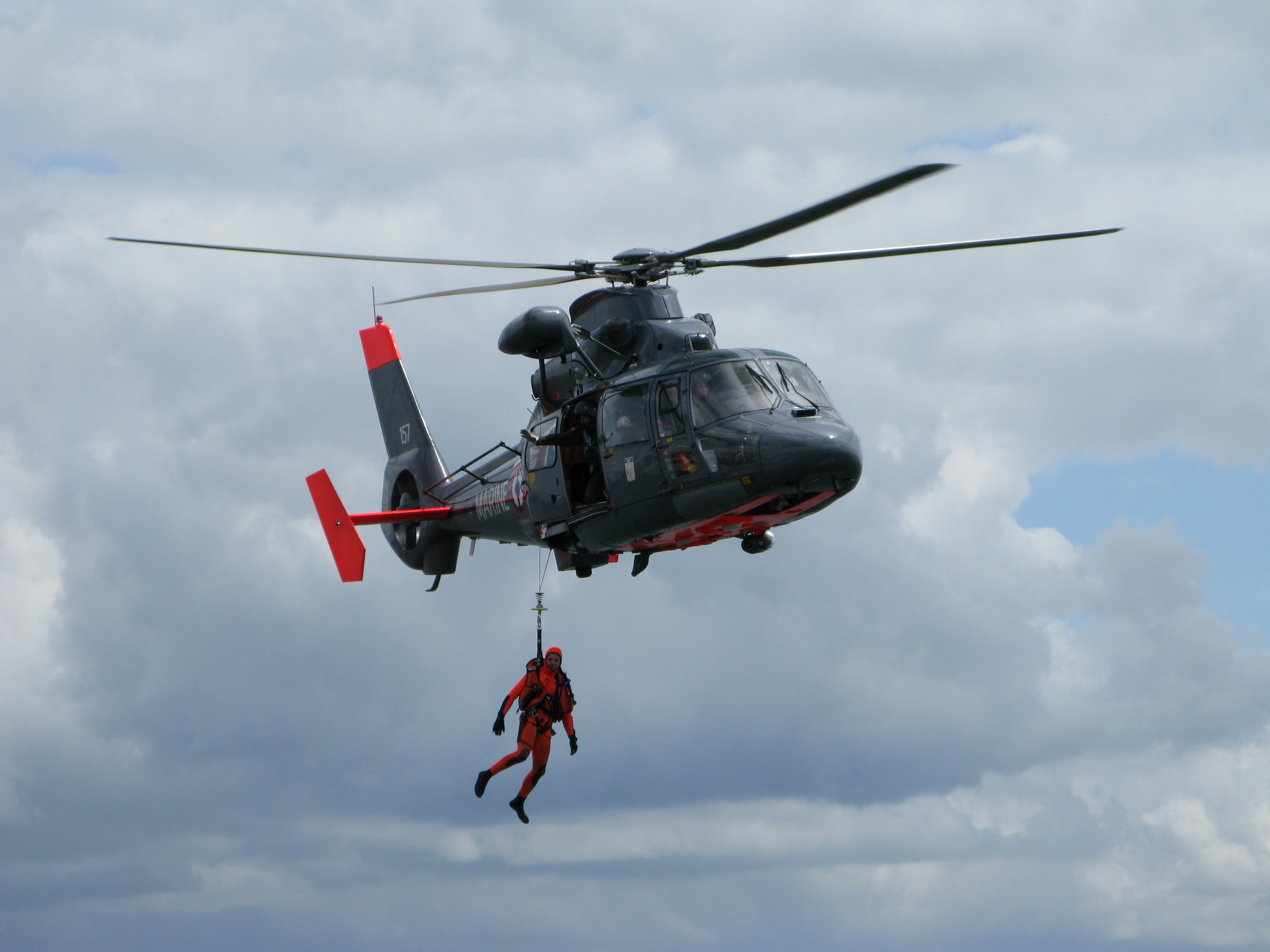
Offshore rescue by French Navy Dauphin helicopter

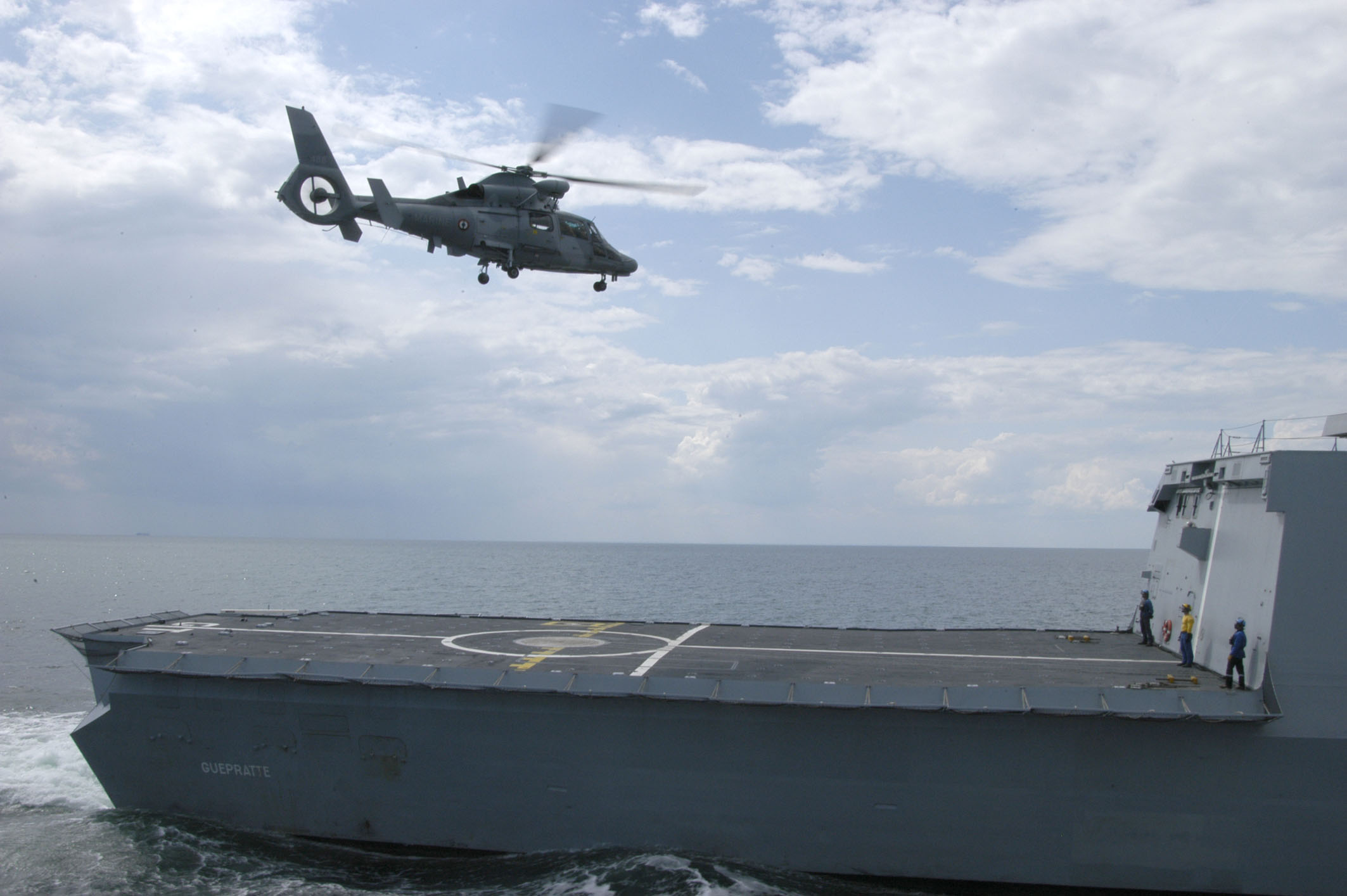
Panther helicopter lifts off the deck of Guépratte

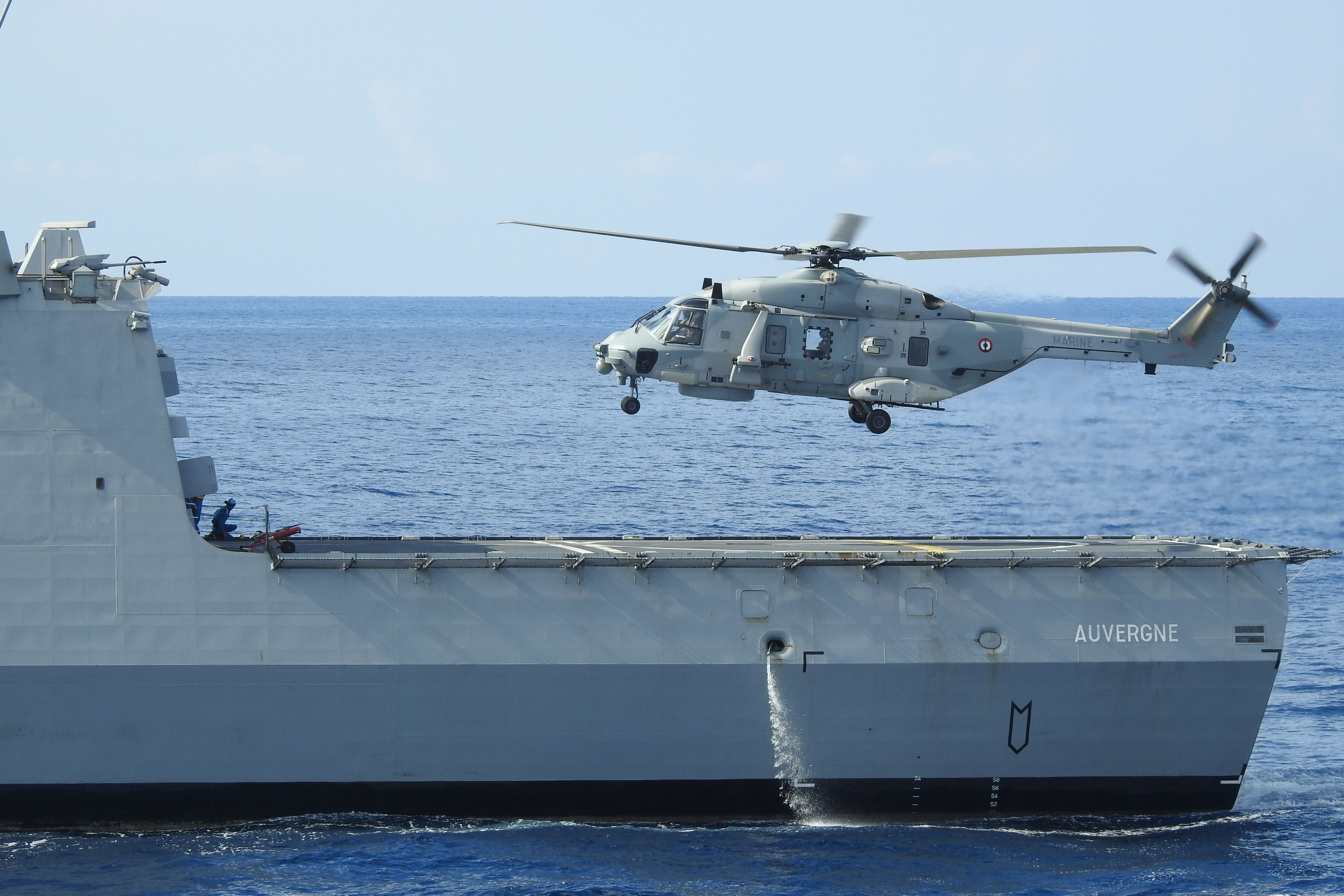
NH90 helicopter of the French Naval Aviation landing on the FREMM multipurpose frigate Auvergne.

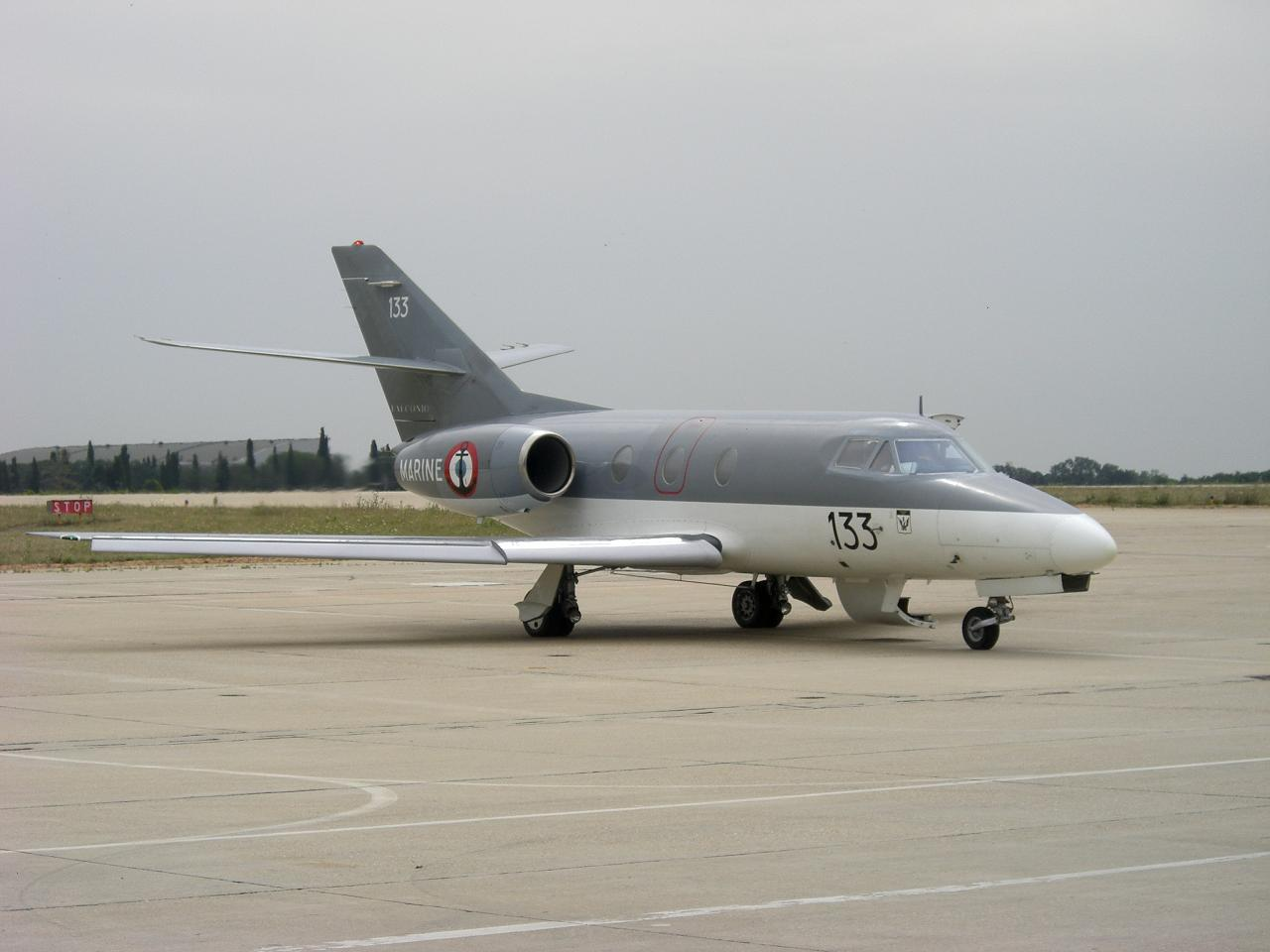
Dassault Falcon 10MER of Escadrille 57S at BAN Nîmes-Garons.

== Aircraft inventory ==
=== Fixed wing aircraft ===
Aircraft	Origin	Role	Variant	In service	Notes
Combat aircraft
Dassault Rafale	France	Swingrole fighter	Rafale M F3-R / F4	41	
Transport aircraft
Embraer EMB 121 Xingu	Brazil	Liaison aircraft	–	8	
Special role aircraft
Grumman E-2 Hawkeye	United States	AEW&C	E-2C Hawkeye 2000	3	Entered service in 1998.
Grumman E-2 Hawkeye	United States	AEW&C	E-2D	0 (+3 on order)	Planned to enter service at the end of 2027.
Bréguet Atlantique 2	France	ASW, MPA	Standard 5	1	Out of 22 Atlantique 2 in service, 18 were modernised to the Standard 6. To be replaced by the Airbus A321 XLR MPA, which is in development since February 2025.
Bréguet Atlantique 2	France	ASW, MPA	Standard 6	18	Out of 22 Atlantique 2 in service, 18 were modernised to the Standard 6. To be replaced by the Airbus A321 XLR MPA, which is in development since February 2025.
Dassault Falcon 20	France	MSA	Falcon 200 Gardian	3	To be replaced by the Falcon 2000LXS Albatros.
Dassault Falcon 50	France	MSA	Falcon 50M Triton	8	To be replaced by the Falcon 2000LXS Albatros.
Dassault Falcon 2000	France	MSA and intervention	Falcon 2000LXS Albatros	3 (+10 on order)	Successor of the Falcon 200 Gardian and the 50M Triton. 7 ordered in December 2020, 5 ordered in October 2025. 2 delivered in September 2026, 1 in November 2026.
Trainer aircraft
Pilatus PC-24	Switzerland	Multi-engine trainer / Liaison	–	2 (+1 on order)	Successor of part of the Dassault Falcon 10MER. 3 aircraft PC-24 rented for the mission. 2 first aircraft delivered in March and August 2026.
Mudry CAP 10	France	Basic trainer / aerobatics	CAP 10M	6	
British Aerospace Jetstream 41	United Kingdom	Military crew training	–	1	Aircraft provided by AVDEF, a French company. Used for maritime patrol and surveillance rear crew training.

=== Rotorcraft ===
Aircraft	Origin	Role	Variant	In service	Notes
Helicopters
NHIndustries NH90	France / Germany / Italy / Netherlands	ASW / ASuW; SAR	NH90NFH Caïman Marine	27	
Eurocopter AS565 Panther	France	Surveillance / intervention / utility	AS565SA Panther	16	Helicopters of the Flotilla 36F are embarked on frigates.
Eurocopter AS365 Dauphin	France	SAR	SA365 F Pedro	3	Operated by the Flotilla 35F from the Charles de Gaulle aircraft carrier as a rescue helicopter.
Eurocopter AS365 Dauphin	France	SAR	SA365 FI	9	
Eurocopter AS365 Dauphin	France	SAR	SA365 N SPI (Secours Protection Intervention)	6	Operated by the Flotilla 35F.
Eurocopter AS365 Dauphin	France	SAR	Dauphin N3+ FI (flotte intérimaire)	2	Operated in French Polynedsia by the Flotilla 35F.
Airbus Helicopters H160	France	SAR	–	6	Interim fleet of the French Navy, rented to Babcock.
Airbus Helicopters H160M -Guépard	France	ASW / ASuW; SAR / Utility	–	0 (+49 on order)	169 H160M ordered by the French Armed Forces, among which, 49 for the French Navy.

=== Unmanned aerial vehicles ===
Aircraft	Origin	Role	Variant	In service	Notes
UAVs
Schiebel Camcopter S-100	Austria	ISR UAS helicopter	S-100F	3 (+5 on order)	Entered service in 2012. 5 more systems ordered in 2026. Note: 1 system is equipped with two drones, so there are 6 drones in service, 10 on order.
Airbus Helicopters VSR700	France	ISR UAS helicopter / transport	–	0 (+6 on order)	6 ordered in January 2026. Based on the Cabri G2 helicopter.

== Retired aircraft ==
This is a list of retired aircraft that have flown with French Naval Aviation.

- Amiot AAC.1 (Junkers Ju 52)
- Avro Anson
- Avro Lancaster Mk.VII
- Beechcraft SNB-5/JRB-4
- Blanchard Brd.1 HB3
- Blériot-SPAD S.42
- Bloch MB.151 C1
- Borel-Odier T BO-2
- Breguet BRE.14B2/A2
- Breguet BRE.19 B2

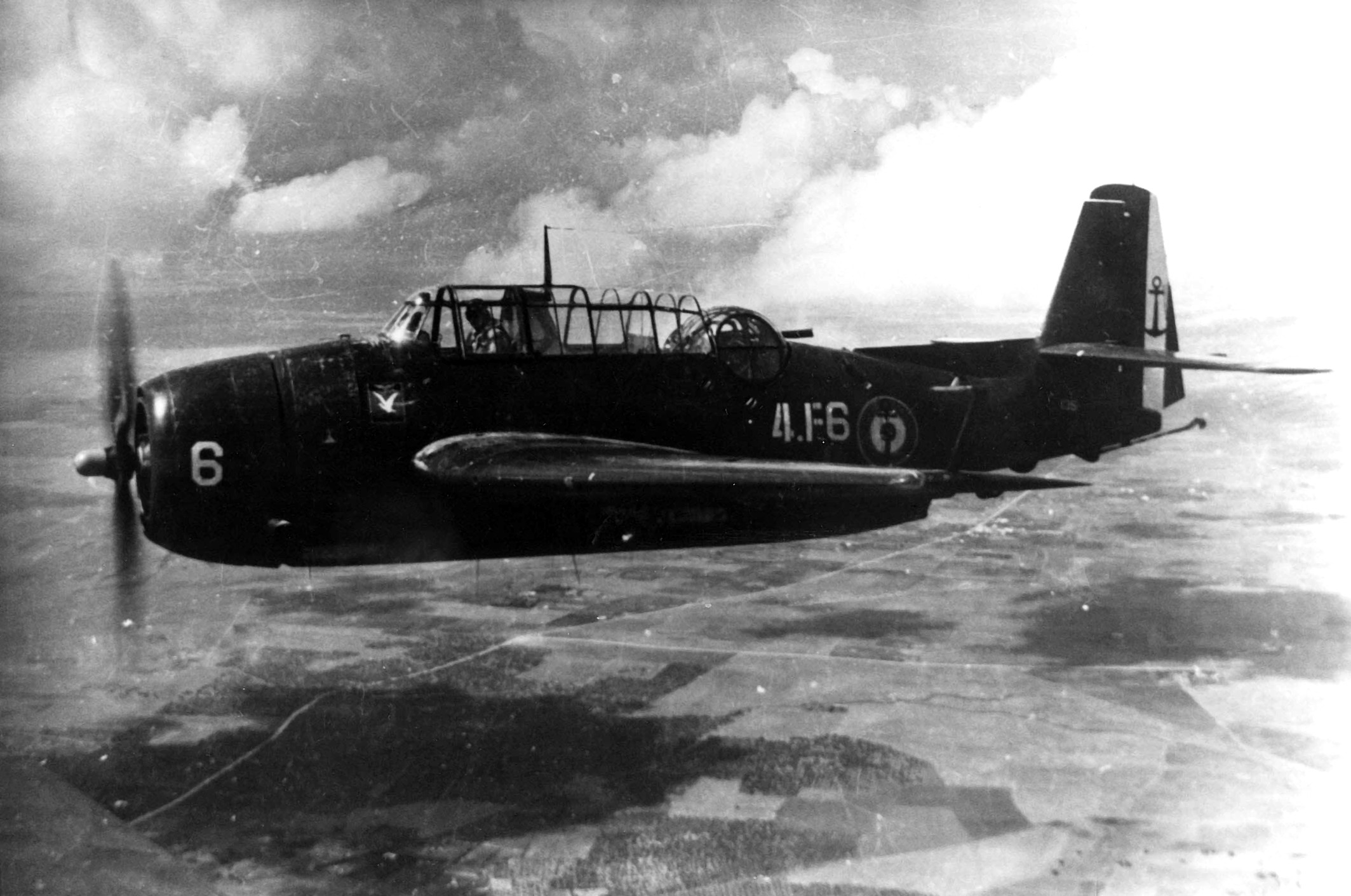
From 1951 to 1956, 164 Grumman Avengers were delivered to French Naval Aviation and in service until 1965

- Bréguet 521 Bizerte
- Bréguet 1050 Alizé
- Bréguet 1150 Atlantic
- CAMS 30E
- CAMS.37A/37²/37.11/Lia
- CAMS 46 Et2
- CAMS 55.1/55.2/55.6/55.10
- Caudron Cau 59 ET2
- Caudron C635 Simoun
- Caudron C.445 Goéland

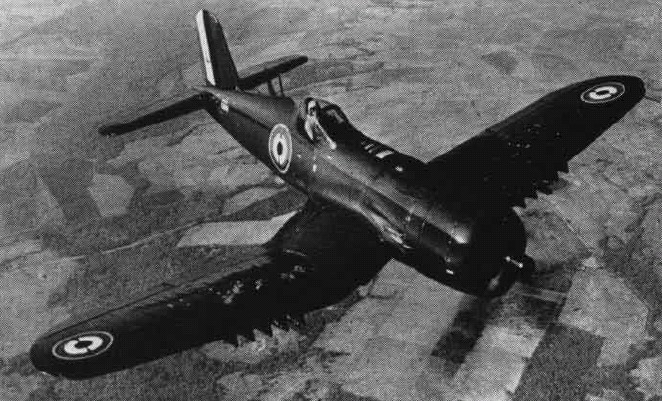
The Corsair F4U-7 was the first new aircraft delivered to the French Navy after 1945. It saw action during the Indochina war, Algerian war and operation Musketeer.

- Canadian Car & Foundry Harvard II
- Chance Vought F4U-7/AU-1 Corsair
- Consolidated PBY-5 Catalina
- Consolidated PB4Y-2 Privateer
- Coutant RMC Type 17
- Curtiss SB2C4/SB2C5 Helldiver
- Dassault Étendard IVM/P
- Dassault MD 312 Flamant
- Dassault Super Étendard
- Dassault Falcon 10 Mer
- De Havilland 100 Vampire Mk.V
- Dewoitine 7 C1
- Dewoitine D.373/D.376
- Dewoitine D.510
- Dewoitine D.520
- Donnet-Denhaut 140/150 hp
- Donnet-Denhaut 160 hp
- Donnet-Denhaut 200 HP HS Triplace/RR/BB
- Donnet-Denhaut 275hp
- Donnet-Denhaut bimoteur
- Dornier Do 24T
- Douglas SBD-5 Dauntless
- Douglas C-47D Dakota
- Farman Lévy HB2 450 hp
- Farman F60 Torp Goliath/F65
- Farman F.165/F.166/F.168 Torp
- Farman F.223.4
- FBA Type C
- FBA Type H
- FBA Type S
- FBA type 14 HE2
- FBA.17HL1/HL2/HMT2/HE2
- FBA.19HMB2
- Fouga CM.175 Zéphyr
- Georges Lévy 280 HB.2
- Gourdou Leseurre ET1 Type 22
- Gourdou Leseurre LGL.32
- Gourdou Leseurre GL.810/811/812/813 HY
- Gourdou Leseurre GL.832 HY
- Grumman F6F-5 Hellcat
- Grumman TBM-3S/E/W/UT Avenger
- Grumman JRF-5 Goose
- Hanriot HD.2 C.1
- Hanriot HD.3 C.2
- Hanriot HD.14 E.2
- Hanriot HD.17 E.2
- Hanriot H.41
- Junkers Ju 188
- Latécoère 290
- Latécoère 298
- Latham 43 HB.3
- Levasseur PL.4 R3b
- Levasseur PL.5 C2b
- Levasseur PL.7 T2B2b
- Levasseur PL.10 R3b/PL.101 R3b
- Levasseur PL.14 Tb2B2
- Levasseur PL.15 T2B2
- Lévy Besson 200 hp
- Lioré et Olivier LeO.7.3
- Lioré et Olivier LeO.20 Bn3
- Lioré et Olivier H.13/H.136
- Lioré et Olivier H.43
- Lioré et Olivier H.193
- Lioré et Olivier H.257 Bis/H258
- Lockheed P2V-1 Ventura
- Lockheed P2V-6/7 Neptune

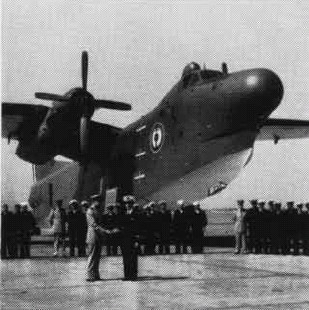
The Martin P5M-2 Marlin served in the French navy between 1959 and 1964.

- Loire 130 C.l
- Loire 210
- LTV/Vought F-8E(FN) Crusader
- Martin 167-A3
- Martin P5M-2 Marlin
- Maurice Farman Type 1910
- Morane Saulnier MoS.130 Et2
- Morane Saulnier MoS.149 Ep2
- Morane Saulnier MS.225 C1
- Morane Saulnier MS.230 Et2
- Morane Saulnier MS.406 C1
- Morane Saulnier MS.500/MS.502 Criquet
- Morane Saulnier MS.733 Alcyon

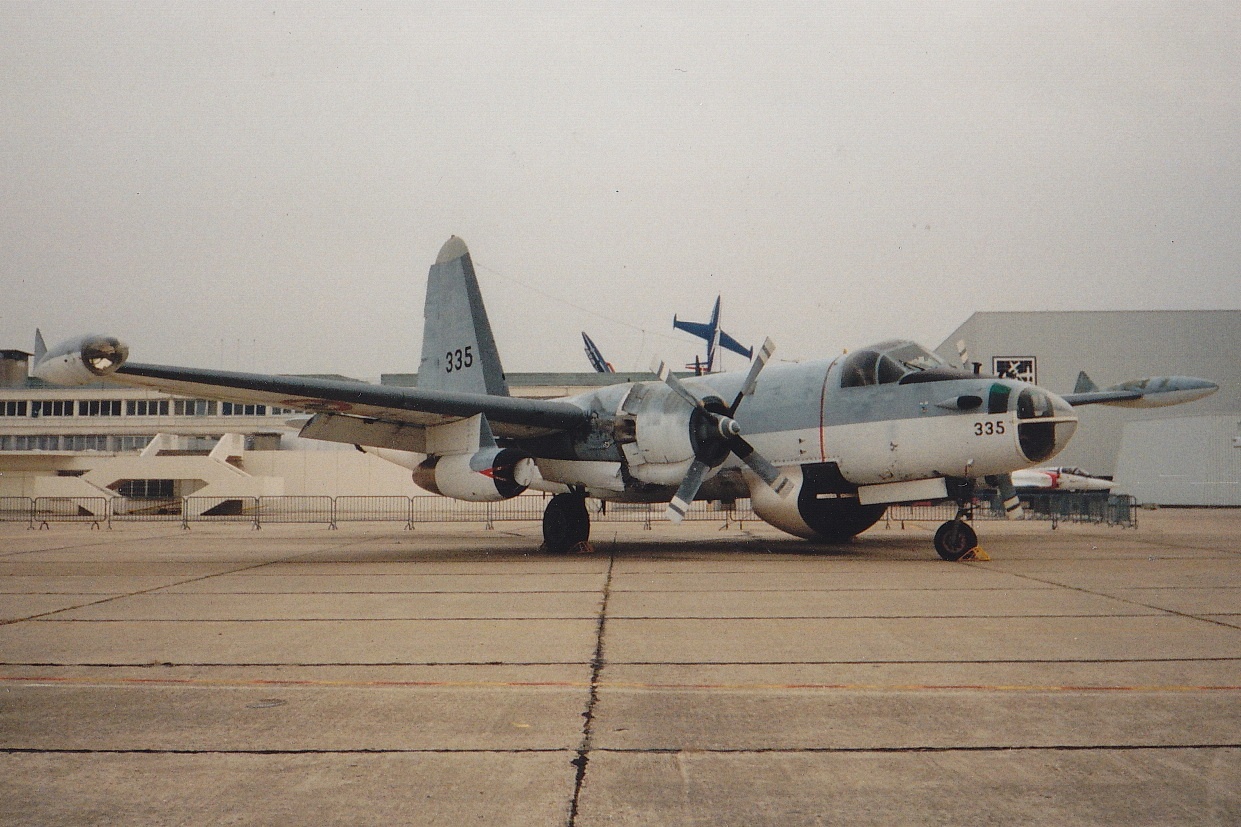
During the Algerian War of independence, the French Navy flew Lockheed Neptunes on surveillance patrol to fight weapons smuggling by sea

- Morane Saulnier MS760 Paris
- Nieuport IV.H
- Nieuport VI.H
- Nieuport 12
- Nieuport N.21/N.23
- Nieuport NiD.62 C1/NiD.622 C1
- Nord 262 Frégate
- North American NAA.57 P2
- North American SNJ-3/4/5
- Piper PA-31 Navajo
- Potez 25 A2/TOE
- Potez 452
- Potez 567
- Potez 631 C3
- Salmson Sal.2 A2
- SCAN 20
- Short Sunderland Mk.III/V
- SNCAC/Farman NC.470
- SNCAC NC.701/NC.702 Martinet
- SNCAN N.1001/N.1002 Pingouin
- SNCAN N.1101 Noralpha
- SNCAN N.1402 Noroit
- SNCAN SV.4C Stampe
- SNCAO/Loire-Nieuport LN.401/LN.411
- SNCASE R.82 Romano
- SNCASE Leo.451
- SNCASE SE.161 Languedoc/Bloch MB.160
- SNCASE Aquilon
- SNCASO/Bloch MB.175
- SNCASO SO.94/95 Corse
- SNCASO SO.30P Bretagne
- SOCATA MS.880 Rallye
- Sopwith Sop.1 A2
- Sopwith Baby/130hp Clerget
- Sopwith Triplan C.1
- SPAD S.VII C.1

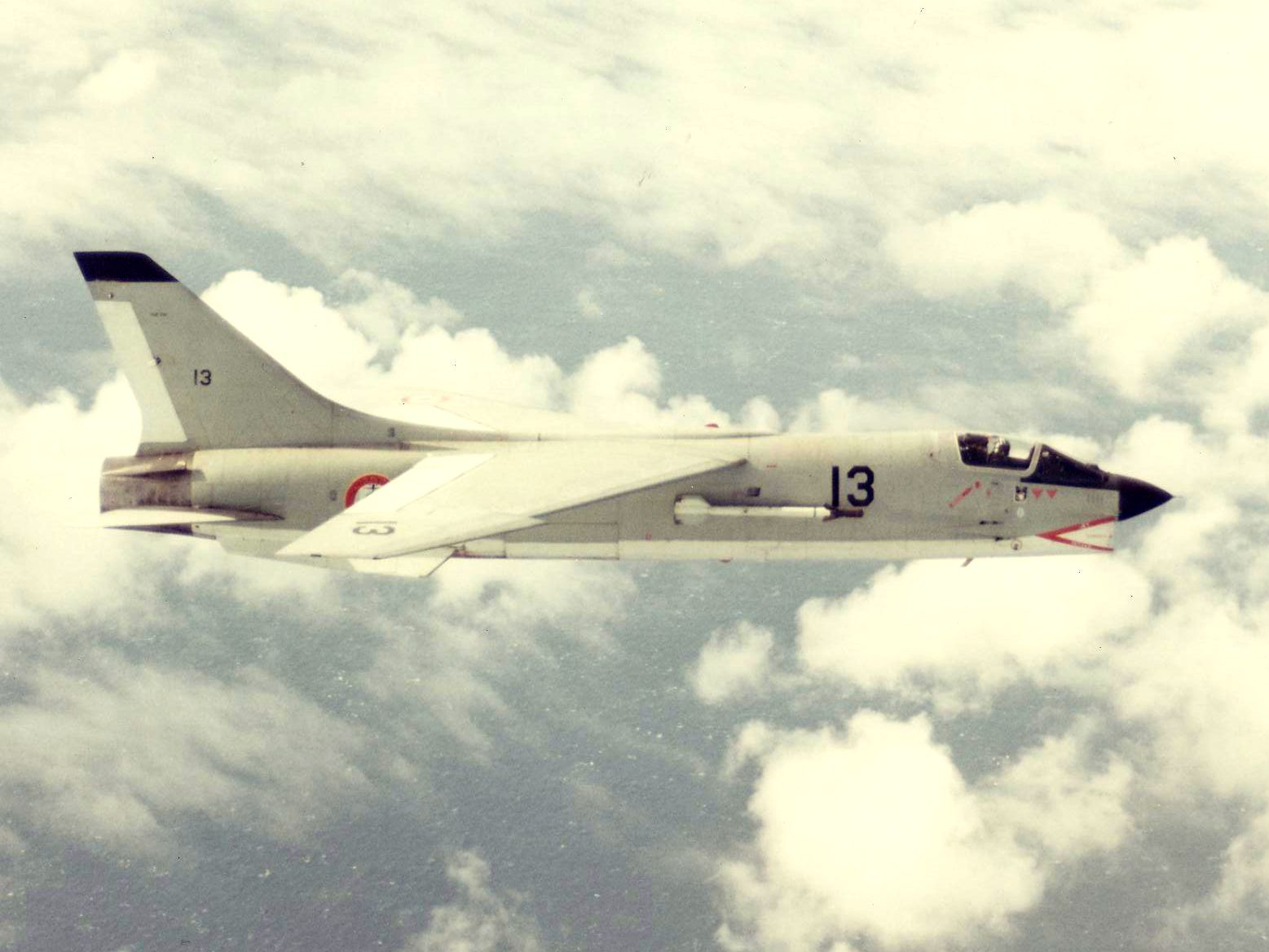
The Crusader was the air superiority jet aircraft of the French Navy for 35 years

- SPAD S.XIII C.1
- SPAD XIV Canon
- Stinson 105
- Supermarine Seafire Mk.III/IX/XV
- Supermarine Sea Otter
- Supermarine Walrus
- Tampier T.4
- Taylorcraft L-2
- Tellier Canon 200 hp
- Tellier 200 hp
- Tellier 350Hp
- Tellier BM 400 hp

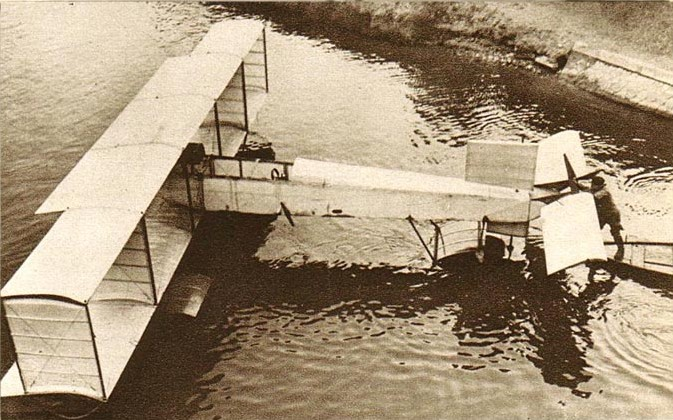
The Canard Voisin was the first seaplane used by the French Navy

- Villiers Vil.2AM C.2
- Vickers Wellington
- Voisin L
- Voisin Canard
- Voisin III
- Voisin VIII
- Vought V.156-F
- Wibault Wib.74 C.1

=== Helicopters and autogyros ===
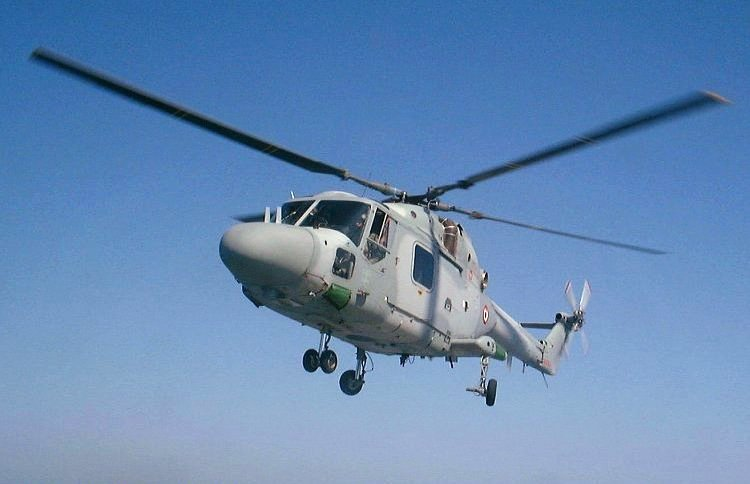
French Navy Lynx; In service from 1979 to 2020.

- Aérospatiale Alouette II
- Aérospatiale Super Frelon
- Bell 47
- LeO C-30
- Lynx Mk.4(FN)
- Piasecki H-21C
- Piasecki HUP-2
- Sikorsky H-51
- Sikorsky S-55
- Sikorsky S-58
- Sud-Aviation HSS-1

== See also ==
- Edouard Guillaud
