= Levasseur PL.1 =

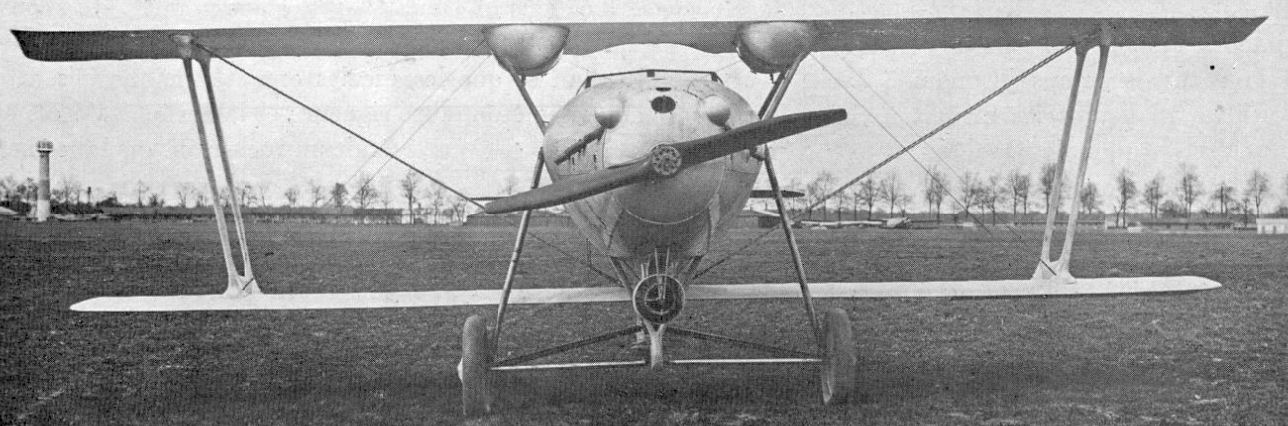

General information
- Type: Touring aircraft
- National origin: France
- Manufacturer: Levasseur
- Designer: Pierre Levasseur
- Number built: 1

History
- First flight: April-May 1922

Pierre Levasseur's first aircraft, the Levasseur PL.1, was a three seat tourer (French category T.O.3) with a novel, simplified structure. One of only two Levasseur powered civil designs, the sole example was completed in 1922.

== Design and development ==
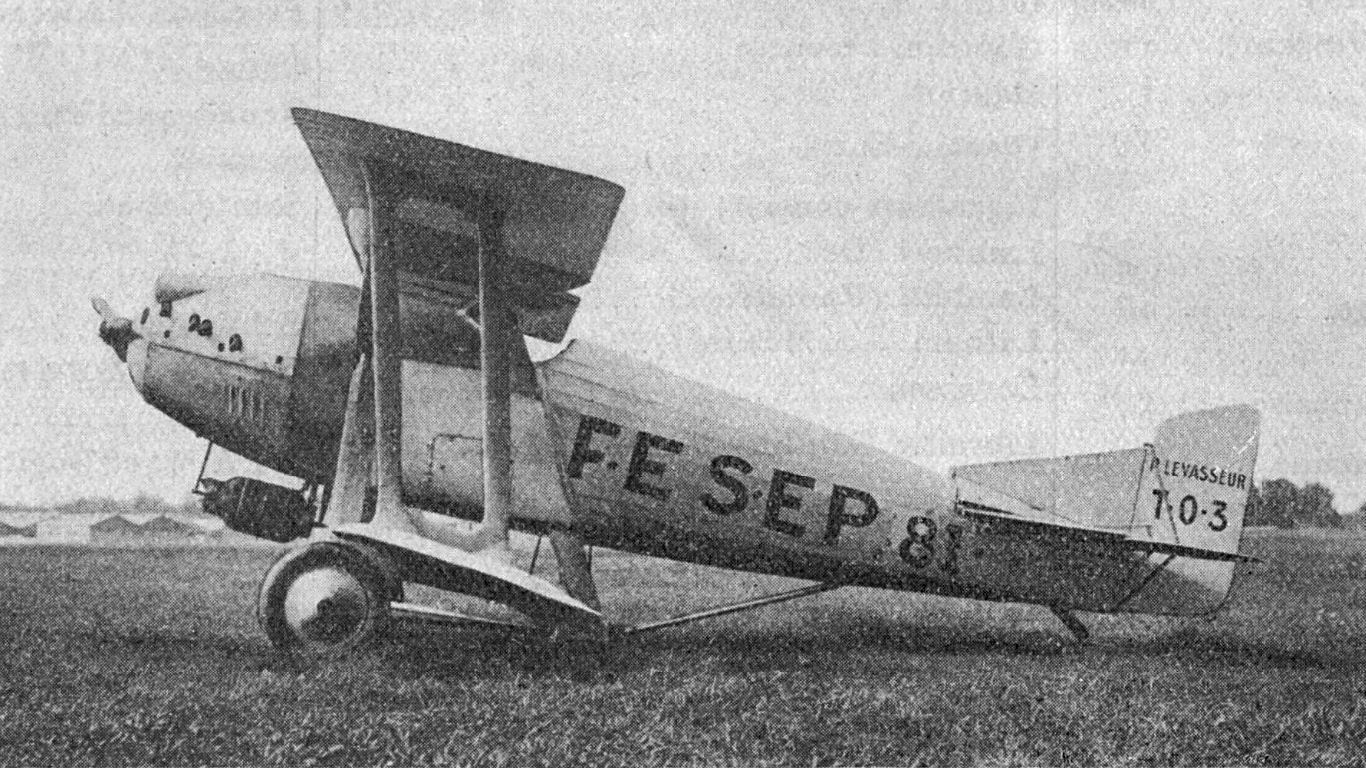
Levasseur PL.1 photo from L'Aéronautique December,1922

The PL.1 had a wooden structure and was fabric covered. Levasseur's prime design aim was to minimize the number of components in order to reduce costs and to do that he produced a central plywood master-frame on which the other parts, principally the wings, engine, fuselage and undercarriage were mounted. The master-frame was formed from a pair of flat, streamlined sub-frames, each with short and parallel upper and lower sides, connected at their ends by two longer and slightly converging members. A cross piece about halfway up stabilised the sub-frame. The two parts were then joined at their base and separated above, with tie-bars about halfway up, into an elongated V.

The tourer was a single bay biplane with 400 mm (15.7 in) of stagger. Its wings had parallel, unswept edges and angled tips. The lower wing had a span 600 mm (23.6 in) less than the upper and only it carried ailerons, which were broad-chord and filled most of the span. The wings were supported centrally on the horizontal top and bottom members of the master-frame, with the lower wing passing under the fuselage. Interplane struts were formed by streamlined parallelogram-shaped frames which leaned both outwards and forward because of the different spans and the stagger.

The tourer was powered by a water-cooled Hispano-Suiza 8Ab V8 engine with its cylindrical Lamblin radiator mounted below. Its bearers were attached to the forward members of the master-frame. The unusual rear part of the fuselage, a plywood girder structure which deepened but converged in plan progressively rearwards was mounted halfway up the rear master-frame members, near the tie-bar. The girder, which carried formers and stringers to define the curved section of the upper fuselage, was braced by a long aluminium tube from its rear to the rear vertex of the master-frame.

There were two open cockpits. The forward one had two side-by side seats equipped with dual controls for the pilot and passenger or pupil. They sat under the trailing edge of the upper wing where the large interplane gap provided good forward vision and a wing cut-out improved their upward view. A separate, circular cockpit behind them could be fitted with a seat for a second passenger.

The empennage was conventional, with near-triangular fin and tailplane, the latter mounted on top of the fuselage girder. Early photographs and drawings show both carried straight-edged control surfaces, though a later photograph shows a taller, round-topped rudder.

The PL.1 had conventional, steel tube landing gear with mainwheels independently mounted on a split axle hinged from the forward vertex of the lower master-frame and with radius arms to its rear. Long legs with shock absorbers joined axle ends to the master-frame as it emerged from the upper fuselage. There was a tailskid at the rear.

The tourer made its first public appearance, uncompleted, in November 1921 at that year's Paris Salon. It did not fly until late April or very early May 1922, when Henri Pitot flew it for twenty minutes. In the last week of May Piton displayed it at the Bourget meeting, demonstrating its good handling with an aerobatic display. The Dubonnet Cup was contested later in that meeting and Pitot was leading the field when the PL.1 experienced a breakdown in the final quarter.

By December 1922 the PL.1 was featured in Levasseur advertisements.

== Specifications ==
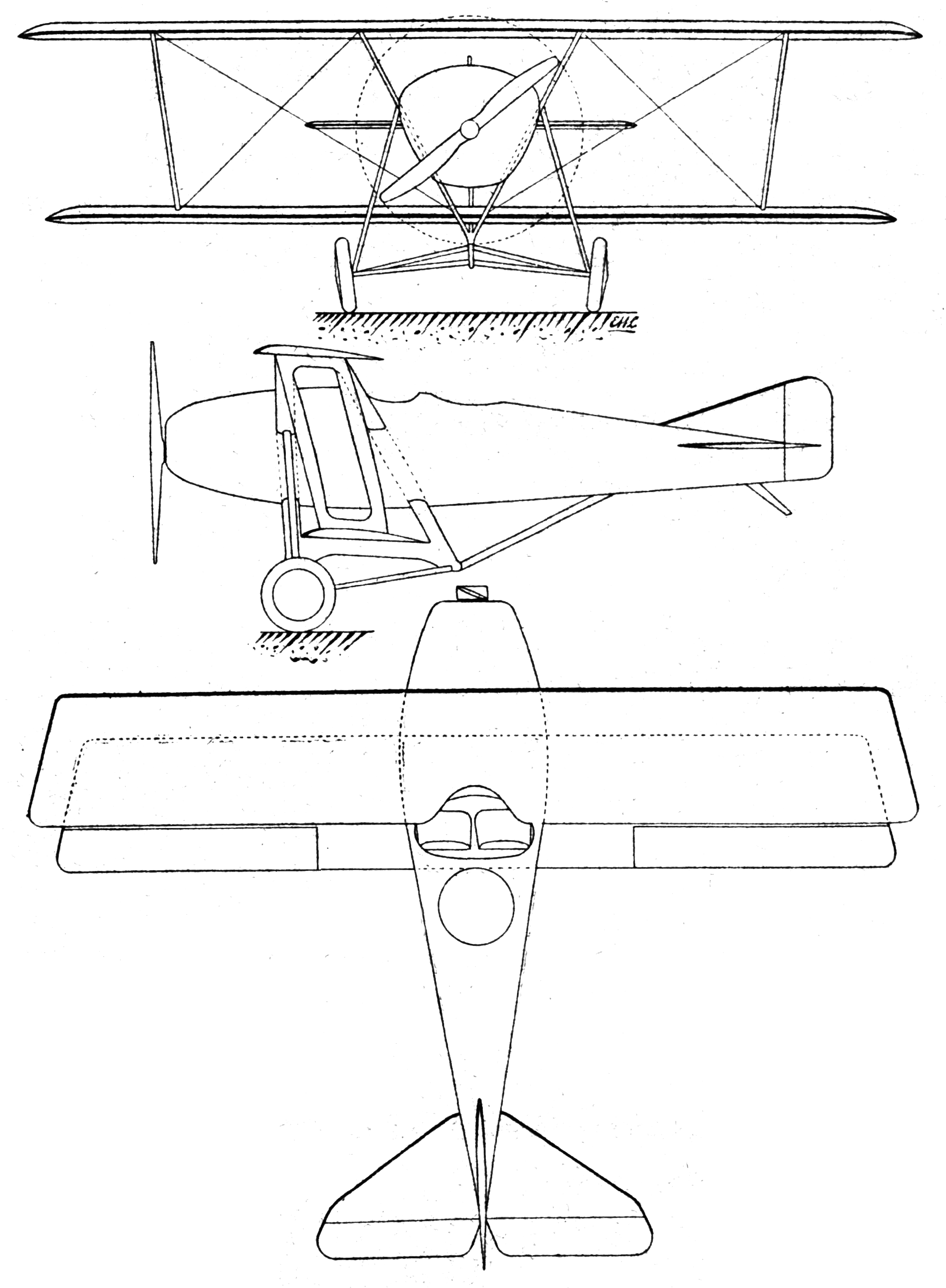
Levasseur PL.1 3-view drawing from Les Ailes December 1,1921

Data from Les Ailes, December 1921

General characteristics

- Crew: One
- Capacity: one or two passengers
- Length: 7.40 m (24 ft 3 in)
- Upper wingspan: 9.70 m (31 ft 10 in)
- Lower wingspan: 9.10 m (29 ft 10 in)
- Height: 3.15 m (10 ft 4 in)
- Wing area: 26 m^{2} (280 sq ft)
- Empty weight: 700 kg (1,543 lb)
- Gross weight: 1,100 kg (2,425 lb)
- Powerplant: 1 × Hispano-Suiza 8Ab water-cooled V-8, 130 kW (180 hp) at 1540 rpm
- Propellers: 2-bladed wooden fixed-pitch

Performance

- Maximum speed: 180 km/h (110 mph, 97 kn)
- Range: 750 km (470 mi, 400 nmi)
- Endurance: 5 hr
- Service ceiling: 4,500 m (14,800 ft)
