= Levasseur PL.14 =

French torpedo bomber

PL.14
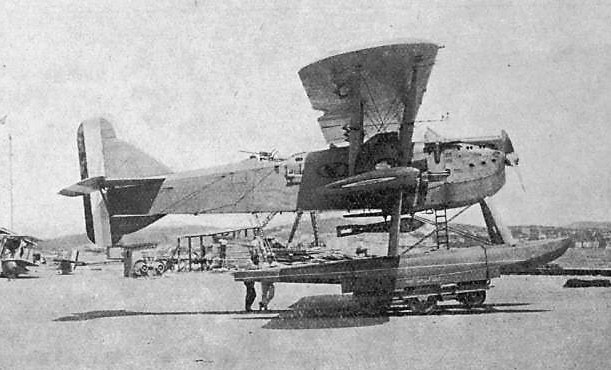

General information
- Type: Seaplane torpedo bomber
- National origin: France
- Manufacturer: Levasseur
- Primary user: Aéronavale
- Number built: 30

History
- First flight: 1929

The Levasseur PL.14 was a torpedo bomber seaplane developed in France in the late 1920s. It was essentially similar to Levasseur's PL.7 carrier-based reconnaissance aircraft with the addition of pontoons. The design dispensed with the small underwing floats that formed part of the safety equipment of Levasseur's carrier-based aircraft of the period, but retained the boat-like fuselage. The wing was built to the 18.00-metre design originally developed for the PL.7 but ultimately rejected in favour of a shorter wing.

Thirty PL.14s were purchased to equip the seaplane base at Berre. When the PL.7s were grounded in 1931, PL.14s were equipped with wheeled undercarriage and put aboard the carrier Béarn in their place. Even after the PL.7s' return to service, four wheeled PL.14s remained aboard Béarn from 1935 to 1937.

== Units using this aircraft ==
France

- Aéronavale
  - Escadrille 7B2

== Specifications ==
General characteristics

- Crew: Three
- Length: 12.85 m (42 ft 2 in)
- Wingspan: 18.00 m (59 ft 1 in)
- Height: 4.90 m (16 ft 1 in)
- Wing area: 74.5 m^{2} (802 sq ft)
- Empty weight: 3,000 kg (6,600 lb)
- Gross weight: 4,250 kg (9,350 lb)
- Powerplant: 1 × Hispano-Suiza 12Nb , 480 kW (650 hp)

Performance

- Maximum speed: 165 km/h (103 mph, 90 kn)
- Cruise speed: 132 km/h (83 mph, 72 kn)
- Range: 960 km (600 mi, 520 nmi)
- Service ceiling: 3,250 m (10,660 ft)

Armament

- 1 × trainable, rearward-firing machine gun in rear cockpit
- 1 × 400 mm or 450 mm torpedo

== See also ==
Related lists

- List of Interwar military aircraft
