= Levasseur PL.7 =

PL.7
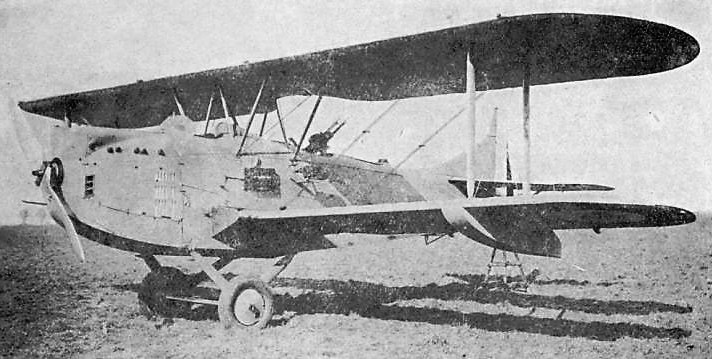

General information
- Type: Carrier-borne torpedo bomber
- National origin: France
- Manufacturer: Levasseur
- Primary user: Aéronavale
- Number built: 46

History
- Introduction date: July 1930
- First flight: August 1928

The Levasseur PL.7 was a torpedo bomber developed in France in the late 1920s. It was a development of Levasseur's PL.4 reconnaissance aircraft and intended to replace their PL.2 then in service with the Aéronavale. It was a single-bay biplane of largely conventional design, but incorporating safety features for naval operation, including jetissonable main undercarriage units, a watertight, boat-shaped fuselage, and small floats on the undersides of the lower wings.

== History ==
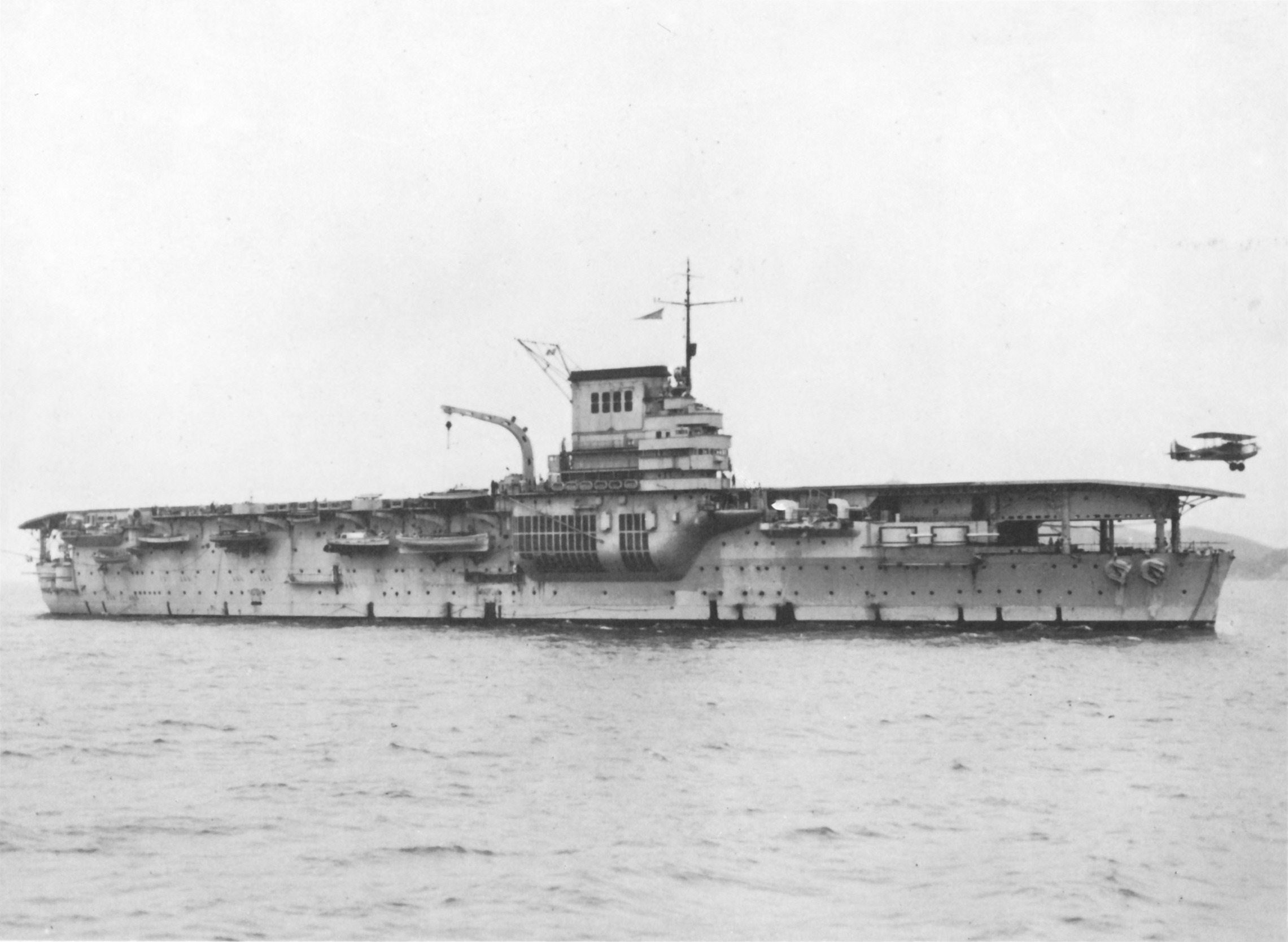
A PL.7 taking off from the French aircraft carrier Béarn

The first flight was in 1928, and during testing, aspects of the design underwent fine-tuning, including engine choice and the design of the wing struts and tail fin. Eventually presented to the Navy, an order for 15 aircraft was placed in 1929. However, the Navy had reservations about the wing design, and ordered five of these machines to be delivered with their spans shortened from the 18.00 m (59 ft 1 in) original down to 16.50 m (54 ft 2 in) and built to different wing areas, and a sixth machine with its span shortened to 17.25 m (56 ft 7 in). These miscellaneous types were all put into service together aboard the carrier Béarn in July 1930. After testing, one of the 16.50 m wing designs was selected as the standard, and 30 new aircraft were ordered with this wing. Ten of the existing PL.7s were also thus modified.

The PL.7s were grounded in July 1931 after two aircraft had disintegrated in flight, losses that were attributed to vibration problems. They were returned to service in September 1932 having reinforced wing bracing and engine mounts, and new three-bladed metal propellers. In 1934, they were relegated to shore duties, but were put aboard the Béarn again in 1936, where they were still in service (albeit now thoroughly obsolete) at the outbreak of the Second World War.

Levasseur displayed an aircraft at the 1926 Salon de l'Aéronautique dubbed the PL.7T (for "transport") and promoted as an airliner. This was fitted with a Gnome et Rhône 9A Jupiter engine and had a revised fuselage with side-by-side seating for a pilot and mechanic and an enclosed cabin for six passengers. This, however, was merely a PL.4 specially modified for the show. It was scrapped immediately afterward, never having flown.

== Variants ==
PL.7 (18.5m span)
18.5 m (61 ft) span, Farman 12We powered; 1built.
PL.7 (18m span)
18 m (59 ft) span, Hispano-Suiza 12Lbr powered; 9 built.
PL.7 (17.25m span)
17.25 m (56.6 ft) span, Hispano-Suiza 12Lbr powered; 1 built.
PL.7 (16.5m span)
16.5 m (54 ft) span, Hispano-Suiza 12Lbr powered; 40 built / converted from PL.7 (18m).
PL.7T
(also known as Levasseur VIIT) An airliner derivative exhibited at the 1926 Salon de l'Aéronautique, with side-by-side seating for a pilot and mechanic and enclosed cabin for six passengers, powered by a Gnome et Rhône 9A Jupiter.

== Operators ==
France

- Aéronavale
  - Escadrille 7B1

== Specifications (PL.7 18.5m span) ==
Data from Jane's all the World's Aircraft 1928, Aviafrance:Levasseur PL 7

General characteristics

- Crew: 3
- Length: 11.68 m (38 ft 4 in)
- Upper wingspan: 18.5 m (60 ft 8 in)
- Lower wingspan: 13.6 m (44 ft 7 in)
- Width: 14.2 m (46 ft 7 in) upper wing-tips folded
- Height: 4.9 m (16 ft 1 in)
- Wing area: 77.5 m^{2} (834 sq ft)
- Empty weight: 2,800 kg (6,173 lb)
- Gross weight: 3,650 kg (8,047 lb)
- Powerplant: 1 × Farman 12We W-12 water-cooled piston engine, 410 kW (550 hp)

Performance

- Maximum speed: 170 km/h (110 mph, 92 kn)
- Range: 645 km (401 mi, 348 nmi)
- Service ceiling: 2,900 m (9,500 ft)
- Time to altitude: 5 hours
- Wing loading: 47.1 kg/m^{2} (9.6 lb/sq ft)

Armament

- Guns: 2 × trainable, rearward-firing machine guns in rear cockpit
- Bombs: 1 × 400 mm (16 in) or 450 mm (18 in) torpedo

== See also ==
Related lists

- List of Interwar military aircraft
