= Toulon–Hyères Airport =

Airport in Toulon, France

Toulon–Hyères Airport Aéroport de Toulon – Hyères

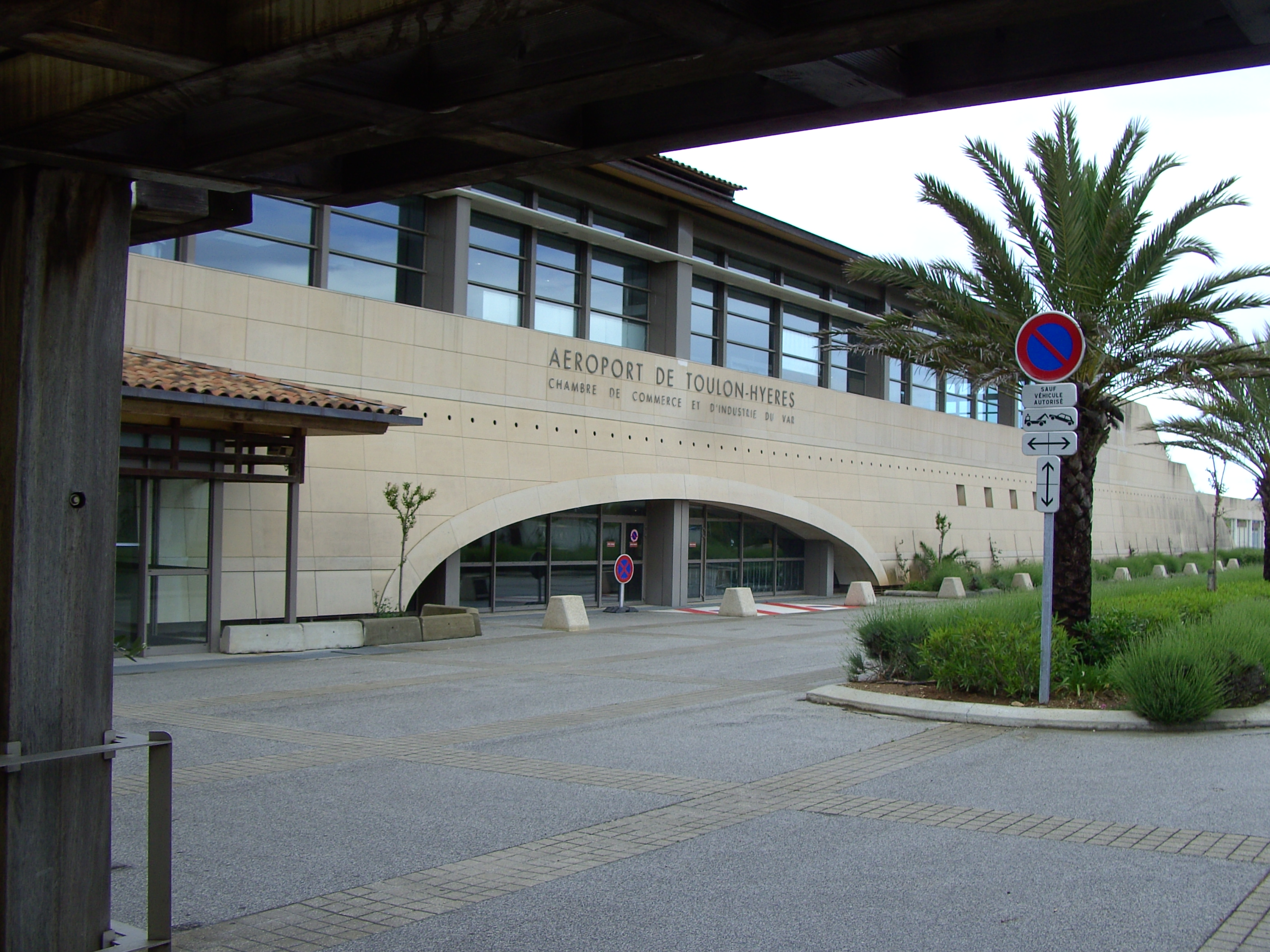
- IATA: TLN; ICAO: LFTH

Summary
- Airport type: Public / Military
- Operator: CCI Du Var
- Serves: Toulon, France
- Location: Hyères
- Elevation AMSL: 13 ft (4.0 m)
- Coordinates: 43°05′50″N 006°08′46″E
- Website: toulon-hyeres.aeroport.fr

Map
- Location in Provence-Alpes-Côte d'Azur region LFTH (France)

Runways
Direction	Length		Surface
Direction	m	ft	Surface
05/23	2,120	6,955	Asphalt
13/31	1,902	6,240	Asphalt

Statistics (2018)
- Passengers: 570,140
- Passenger traffic change: ▲13.1%
- Source: AIP France, Aeroport.fr

Toulon–Hyères Airport (French: Aéroport de Toulon – Hyères, IATA: TLN, ICAO: LFTH) is an international airport serving Toulon and Hyeres in southeastern France. The airport is located 3 kilometres (2 mi) southeast of Hyères, and 19 kilometres (12 mi) east of Toulon. It is also known as Hyères Le Palyvestre Airport. The airport opened in 1966.

== Facilities ==
The airport resides at an elevation of 13 feet (4 m) above mean sea level. It has two paved runways: 05/23 measures 2,120 by 45 metres (6,955 ft × 148 ft) and 13/31 is 1,902 by 46 metres (6,240 ft × 151 ft).

== Military use ==
This airport is shared with the French Naval Aviation (Aéronautique navale), as Hyeres Naval Air Base (la base d'aviation navale d'Hyères). Several squadrons of helicopters and fixed-wing aircraft are based on the south-western side of the airport.

== Airlines and destinations ==
The following airlines operate regular scheduled and charter flights at Toulon–Hyères Airport:

Airlines	Destinations
Air Corsica	Seasonal: Ajaccio, Bastia, Figari
British Airways	Seasonal: London–City
ASL Airlines France	Seasonal: Algiers, Lille
Luxair	Seasonal: Luxembourg
Volotea	Seasonal: Lille
Transavia	Algiers, Brest, Nantes, Paris–Orly; Seasonal: Bordeaux, Rotterdam/The Hague
