= Levasseur-Abrial A-1 =

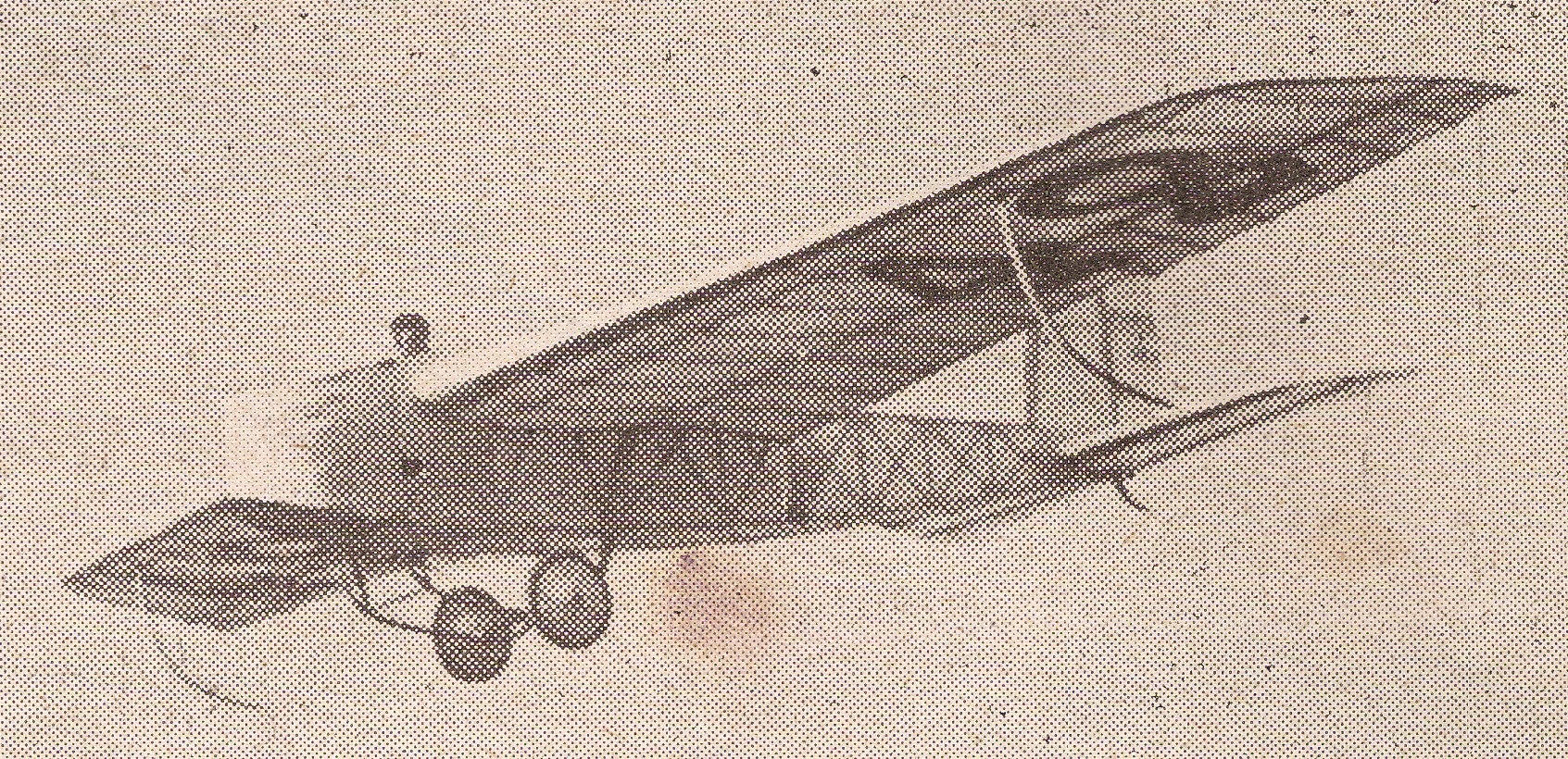
- The plane Levasseur-Abrial displayed to the aerial meeting of Combegrasse in 1922.

General information
- Type: Glider
- National origin: France
- Manufacturer: Levasseur
- Designer: Georges Abrial and Pierre Levasseur
- Number built: 1

History
- First flight: 1922

The Levasseur-Abrial A-1 was a glider built in 1922 as a result of a collaboration between French aerodynamicist Georges Abrial de Péga and constructor Pierre Levasseur. A single example was built, which was destroyed on its fourth flight.

== Design and development ==
The A-1 had a one piece, cantilever wing with swept leading edges, an unswept trailing edge and blunted tips. It had a reflex, Joukovsky airfoil section and was thick in the centre, thinning outboard where tapered ailerons reached out to the tips. It was built around pairs of swept wooden spars with plywood skin from the forward one around the nose forming a torsion resisting D-box. The rest of the wing was covered with silk (pongée).

The wing was set into the upper part of the flat-sided fuselage, with an open cockpit at its leading edge and behind a short, vertically edged nose. The fuselage tapered aft to large tail surfaces; a lightly swept, cantilever tailplane with angled tips was mounted at mid-height, carrying a one-piece elevator. The rounded profile of the fin merged into that of its rhomboidal rudder, leaving room below for elevator movement.

The A-1's landing gear was based on a pair of ash skids, mounted from the fuselage on aluminium struts and cross-braced. There were light skids below the outer wings to protect the tips. If the terrain was suitable, wheels on a 600 mm (23.6 in) track single axle could be attached to them.

== Operational history ==
The Levasseur-Abrial A-1 took part in the Congrès Experimental de Combegrasse, held in August 1922 near Clermont Ferrand at a time when gliding as a sport was just beginning and before the importance of ridge lift or thermals was appreciated. It made three successful downhill flights after rubber cord launches, the longest lasting 117 s. On the fourth attempt the launching cord fouled the right wing and the glider crashed. Its pilot, Henri Pitot, escaped unhurt but the glider was badly damaged.

The wing survived well enough to be on display on the Levasseur stand at the Paris Salon in November 1922. Its covering was partially removed to show the lightweight structure.

== Specifications ==
Data from Flight, August 1922 except where noted

General characteristics

- Crew: 1
- Length: 6.1 m (20 ft)
- Wingspan: 12 m (40 ft) (Les Ailes gives 11.20 m (36 ft 9 in))
- Wing area: 20.0 m^{2} (215 sq ft)
- Empty weight: 90 kg (198 lb)
