= Levasseur PL.10 =

PL.10
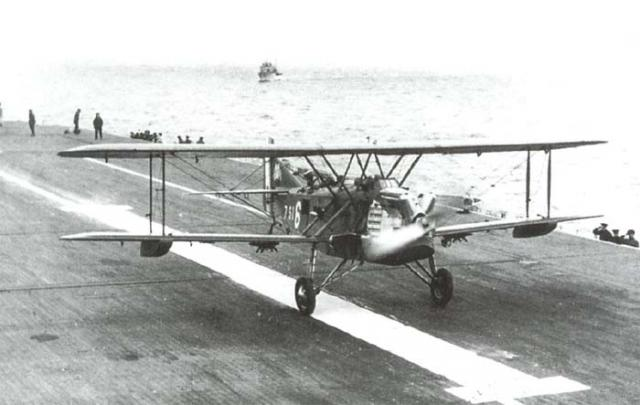

General information
- Type: Carrier-borne reconnaissance aircraft
- National origin: France
- Manufacturer: Levasseur
- Primary user: Aéronavale
- Number built: 63

History
- Introduction date: 1931
- First flight: Spring 1929

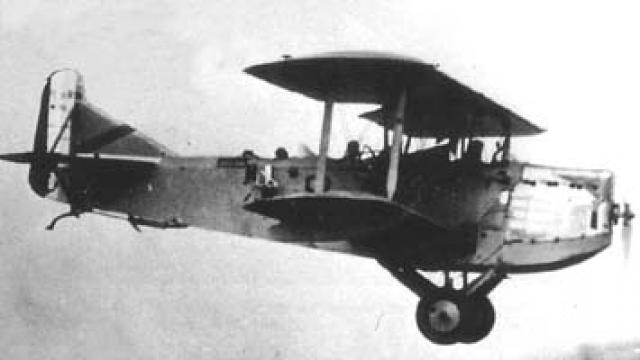
Levasseur PL.10 in flight

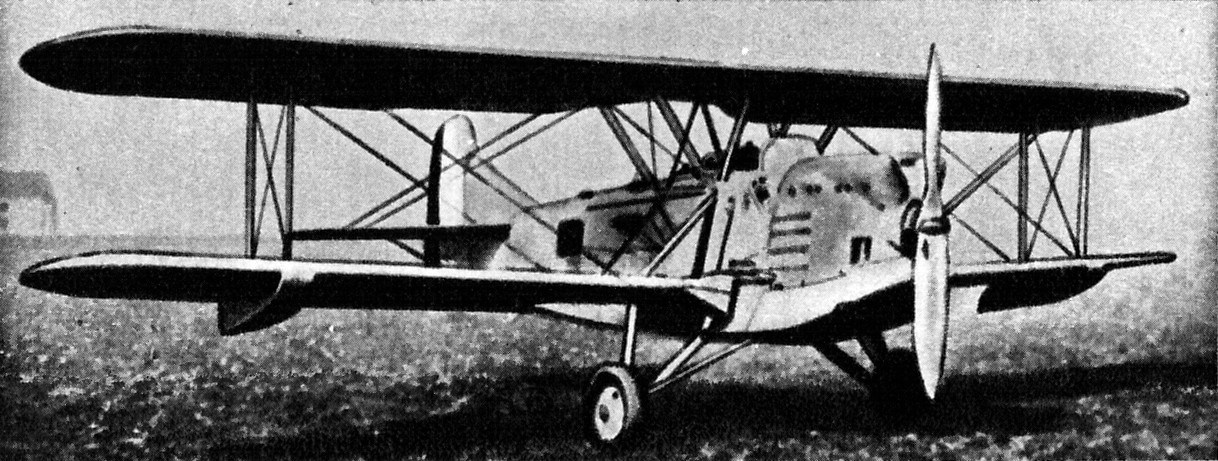
Levasseur PL.101

The Levasseur PL.10 was a carrier-based reconnaissance aircraft developed in France in the late 1920s. It was a conventional, single-bay biplane along similar lines to Levasseur's contemporary designs for the French navy, including a watertight, boat-shaped fuselage, small underwing floats, and undercarriage that could be jettisoned in flight in order to improve the chances of a successful ditching.

Thirty of these machines were purchased by the Aéronavale, entering service aboard the carrier Béarn in 1931 under the designation R3b. In 1935, these were followed by thirty examples of an improved version, the PL.101, which replaced the original PL.10s in service aboard the carrier.

The PL.10 was also radically revised in the PL.107 torpedo bomber prototypes of 1937. These featured a fully enclosed cockpit that also enclosed the mounting between the fuselage and upper wing, therefore moving the fuselage higher in the interplane gap. To compensate for this, the lower wing was replaced with one of inverse gull design, and the main undercarriage units were moved to their "low points" and provided with spats. Two prototypes were evaluated and rejected by the Aéronavale. Levasseur then made one final attempt to sell the PL.10 design in the PL.108, which was generally similar to the PL.107s. This first flew on 26 September 1939, but proved no more promising than its predecessors.

== Variants ==
- PL.10 - original version with Hispano-Suiza 12Lb engine (30 built)
- PL.101 - revised version with Hispano-Suiza 12Lb engine, wider-track undercarriage, and slight sweepback on the wings (30 built)
- PL.107 - torpedo bomber version with an enclosed cockpit, new lower wing, spatted undercarriage, and Gnome-Rhône 9Kfr engine (2 built)
- PL.108 - similar to PL.107, but with Hispano-Suiza 9Vbrs (1 built)

== Units using this aircraft ==
France

- Aéronavale
  - Escadrille 7S1

== Specifications (PL.101) ==
General characteristics

- Crew: Three
- Length: 9.75 m (32 ft 0 in)
- Wingspan: 14.20 m (46 ft 7 in)
- Height: 3.75 m (12 ft 4 in)
- Wing area: 56.8 m^{2} (611 sq ft)
- Empty weight: 2,020 kg (4,440 lb)
- Gross weight: 3,150 kg (6,930 lb)
- Powerplant: 1 × Hispano-Suiza 12Lb , 450 kW (600 hp)

Performance

- Maximum speed: 220 km/h (140 mph, 120 kn)
- Cruise speed: 130 km/h (80 mph, 70 kn)
- Range: 600 km (375 mi, 326 nmi)
- Service ceiling: 4,500 m (14,800 ft)

Armament

- 1 × fixed, forward-firing machine gun
- 1 × trainable, rearward-firing machine gun
- 60 kg (132 lb) bombs
