= Teillier =

Teillier is a surname. Notable people with the surname include:

- Guillermo Teillier (1943–2023), Chilean politician
- Jorge Teillier (1935–1996), Chilean poet

== See also ==
- Tellier
