= Levasseur PL.4 =

PL.4
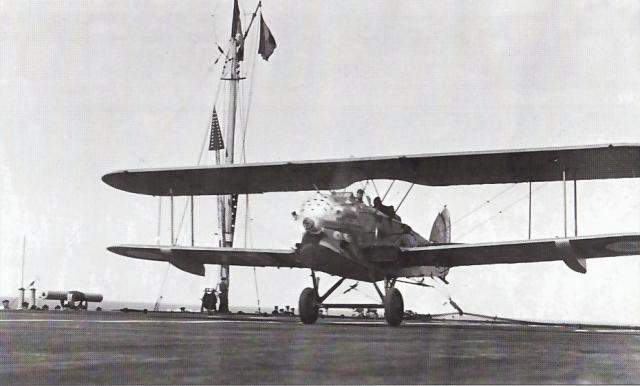
- Deck landing of a Levasseur PL.4

General information
- Type: Carrier-based reconnaissance aircraft
- National origin: France
- Manufacturer: Levasseur
- Primary user: Aéronavale
- Number built: 40

History
- First flight: 1926
- Developed into: Levasseur PL.8

The Levasseur PL.4, a.k.a. Levasseur Marin, was a carrier-based reconnaissance aircraft produced in France in the 1920s.

== Design and development ==
The PL.4 was a conventional, single-bay biplane that carried a crew of three in tandem, open cockpits. Purchased by the Aéronavale to operate from the aircraft carrier Béarn, it incorporated several safety features in case of ditching at sea. Apart from small floats attached directly to the undersides of the lower wing, the main units of the fixed, tailskid undercarriage could be jettisoned in flight, and the underside of the fuselage was given a boat-like shape and made watertight. Additionally, the crew can survive a crash by ejecting the landing gear.

== Variants ==
PL.4 A3 R3b
to meet the 1924 A.3/R.3b (three seat observation and gunnery spotter aircraft) specification from the Service technique de l'aéronautique (STAé); 1 built.
PL.4
3-seat shipboard reconnaissance aircraft for the Aéronautique Navale; 40 built.

== Operators ==
France

- Aéronavale
  - Escadrille 7R1

== Specifications (PL.4) ==
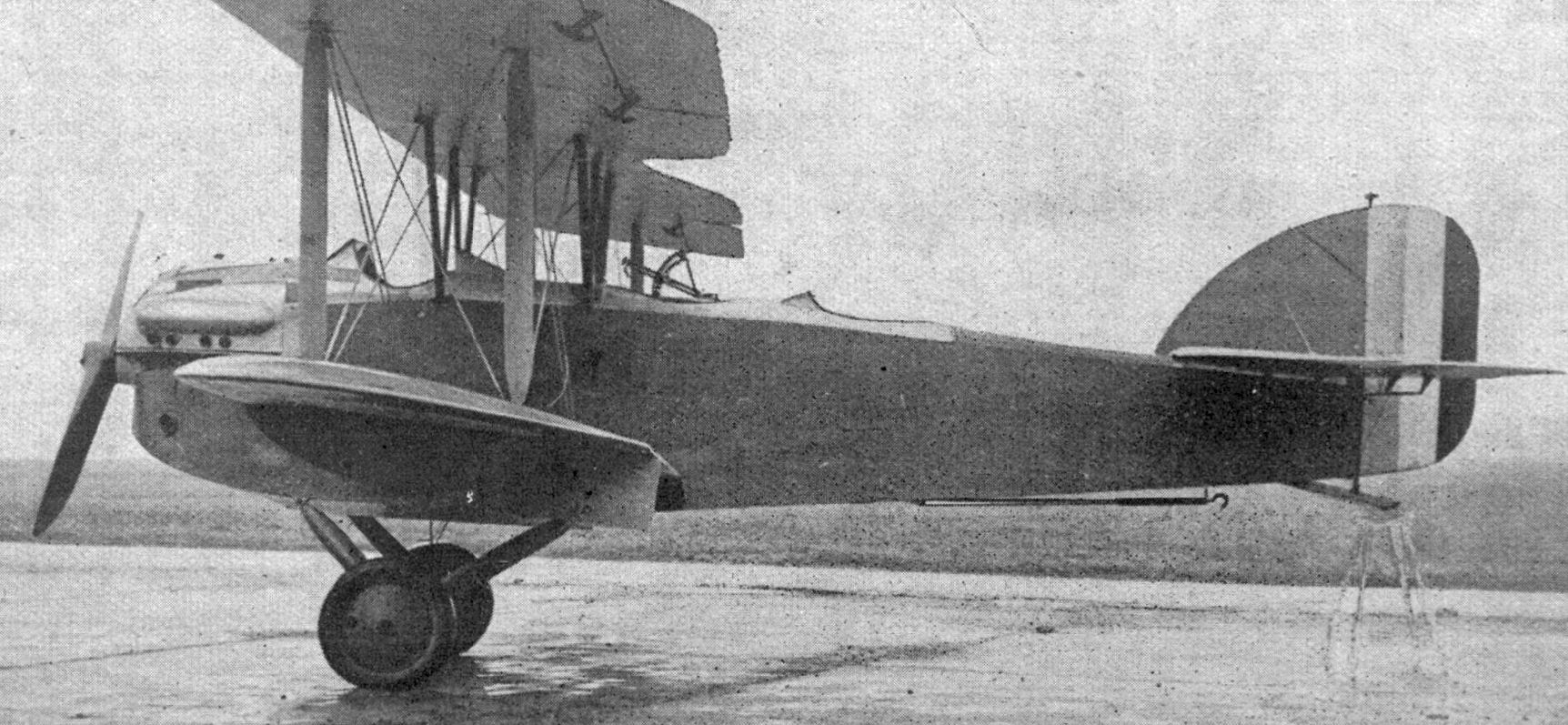
Levasseur PL.4 photo from L'Aéronautique December,1926

Data from Jane's all the World's Aircraft 1928 and Aviafrance:Levasseur PL.4

General characteristics

- Crew: 3
- Length: 9.7 m (31 ft 10 in)
- Wingspan: 14.6 m (47 ft 11 in)
- Width: 5.67 m (18 ft 7 in) wings folded
- Height: 3.915 m (12 ft 10 in)
- Wing area: 60 m^{2} (650 sq ft)
- Empty weight: 1,650 kg (3,638 lb)
- Gross weight: 2,550 kg (5,622 lb)
- Powerplant: 1 × Lorraine-Dietrich 12Eb W-12 water-cooled piston engine, 340 kW (450 hp)
- Propellers: 2-bladed fixed-pitch propeller

Performance

- Maximum speed: 175 km/h (109 mph, 94 kn) at sea level; 170 km/h (110 mph; 92 kn) at 3,000 m (9,800 ft)
- Range: 900 km (560 mi, 490 nmi)
- Endurance: 5 hours
- Service ceiling: 5,000 m (16,000 ft)
- Time to altitude: 3,000 m (9,800 ft) in 20 minutes
- Wing loading: 43 kg/m^{2} (8.8 lb/sq ft)
- Power/mass: 0.1337 kW/kg (0.0813 hp/lb)

Armament

- Guns: defensive gun armament on a Scarff ring in the centre cockpit

== See also ==
Related lists

- List of Interwar military aircraft
