= Honneur, patrie, valeur, discipline =

Motto of the French Navy

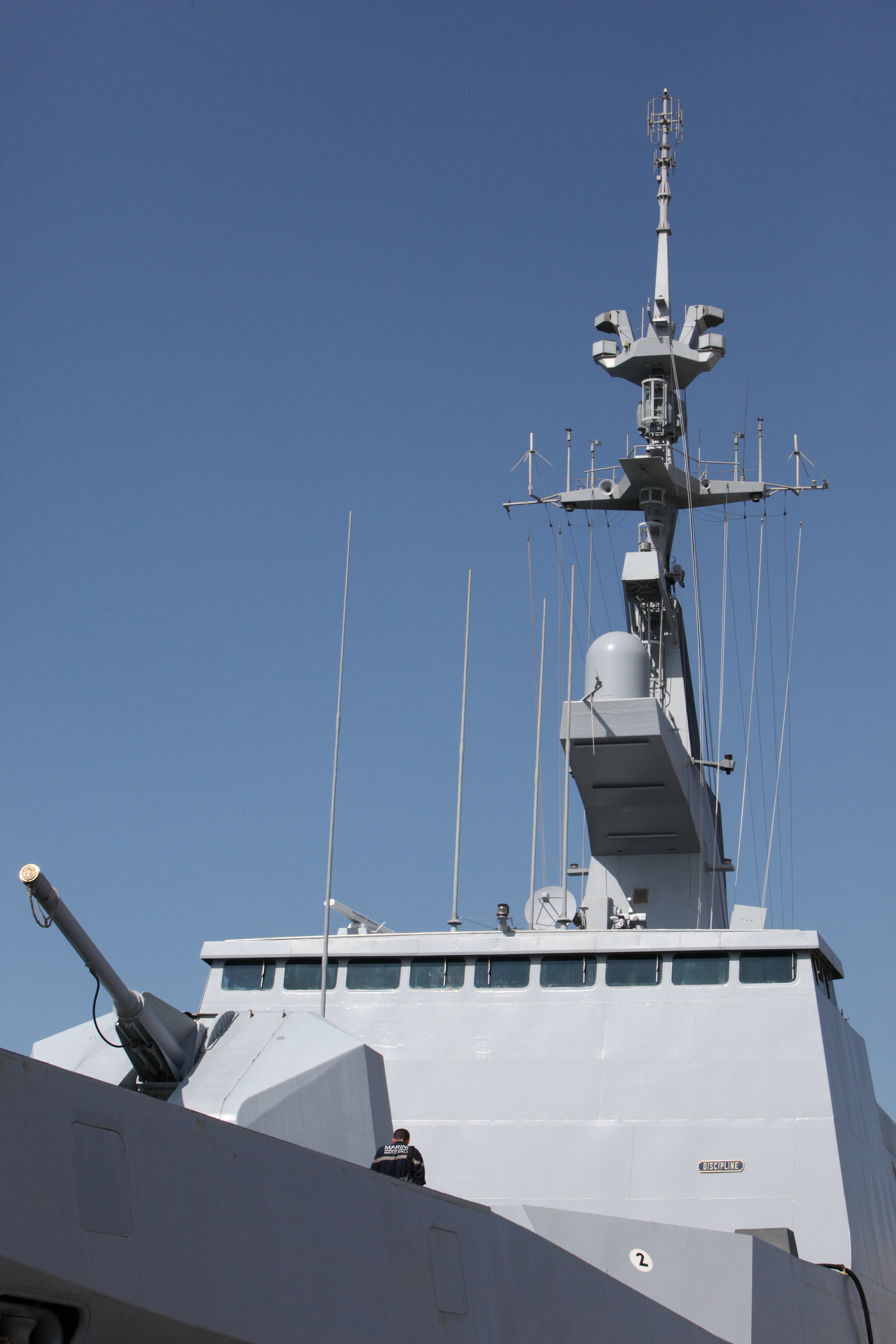
The superstructure of the stealth frigate Surcouf; the word Discipline can be seen on the plaque affixed to the port side of the front wall.

Honneur, patrie, valeur, discipline (lit. 'Honour, Fatherland, Valour, Discipline') is the motto of the French Navy. It is found inscribed on all ships and buildings, sometimes with each word on its separate plaque at a corner of the superstructure. A memorial plaque for Paul-Henri Nargeolet, who died in the Titan submersible implosion, features the motto. It was placed at the wreckage of the Titanic in 2024.

== Origin ==
The motto uses words found in traditional mottos of French institutions: "Honneur - Patrie", and "Valeur - Discipline"

- "Honneur - Patrie" is the motto of the Légion d'honneur; it has been inscribed on military flags under the First French Empire, and also became the motto of the French Navy from 1830;
- "Valeur - Discipline" was inscribed on military flags under the late First Empire; fallen in disuse under the Bourbon Restauration, is reappeared on the flags of the French Second Republic and on the reverse of the Médaille militaire.

Probably under the Second French Empire, these two mottos fused and became features of French naval ships.

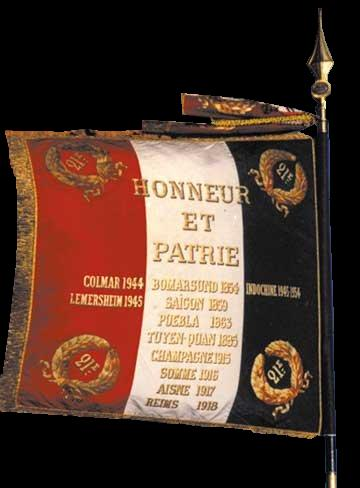
"Honneur - Patrie" on the flag of the 21st Marine Infantry Regiment.

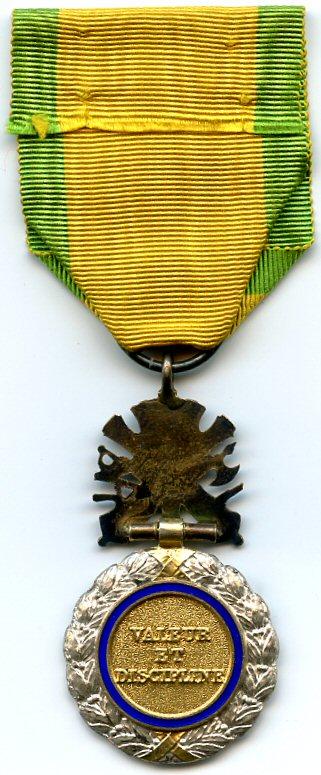
"Valeur - Discipline" on the reverse of the Médaille militaire.

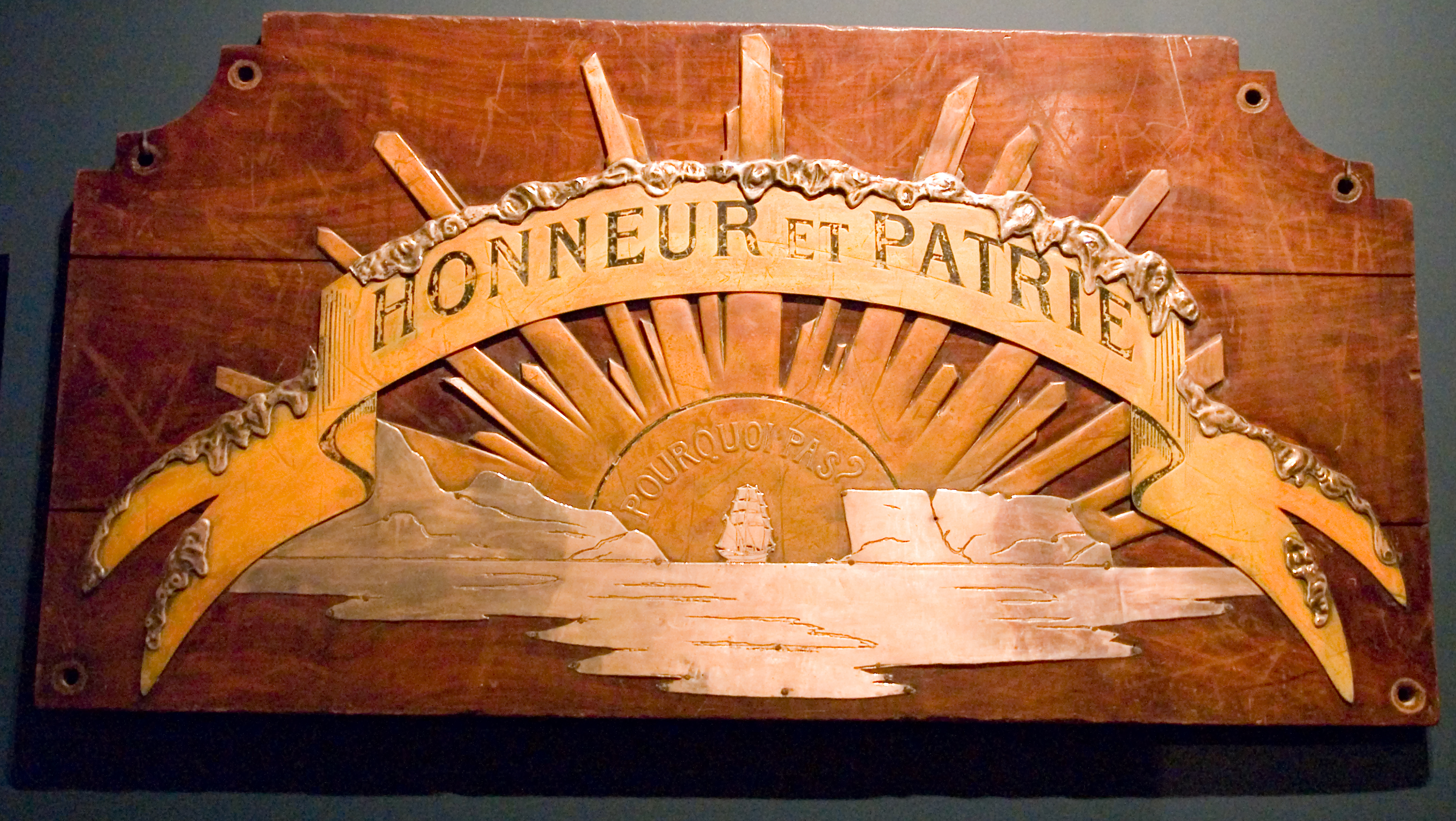
"Honneur et Patrie" on a poop deck panel of the Pourquoi-Pas ?.

== See also ==
- Honneur et fidélité

== Sources and references ==
- L'origine de la devise : "Honneur, Patrie, Valeur Discipline", Le fauteuil de Colbert.

Specific
