= Levasseur PL.2 =

French biplane torpedo bomber

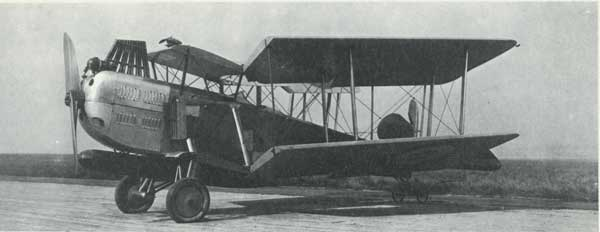
- Levasseur PL.2, June 1926

General information
- Type: Torpedo-bomber biplane
- Manufacturer: Levasseur
- Designer: Pierre Levasseur
- Primary user: French Navy
- Number built: 11

History
- Manufactured: 1922-1923
- Introduction date: 1926
- First flight: November 1922
- Retired: 1932

The Levasseur PL.2 was a French biplane torpedo bomber designed by Pierre Levasseur for the French Navy.

== Design and development ==
The second design of Pierre Levasseur was the PL.2, a single-seat unequal-span biplane inspired by designs from Blackburn Aircraft. It had a fixed tailskid landing gear and was powered by a nose-mounted Renault engine. The first of two prototypes first flew in November 1922. The second aircraft had a four-bladed propeller and other powerplant improvements. Nine production aircraft were built in 1923, these were fitted with ballonets and jettisonable landing gear for operations at sea.

== Operational history ==
The aircraft entered service in 1926 aboard the French aircraft carrier Béarn and continued in use until they were scrapped in 1932.

== Variants ==
- PL 2 AT-01 : First torpedo-bomber prototype.
- PL 2 AT-02 : Second prototype, equipped with a four-blade propeller.
- PL.2 : Single-seat torpedo-bomber aircraft, nine built for the French Navy.

== Operators ==
France

- French Navy
  - Escadrille 7B2

== Specifications ==
Data from The Illustrated Encyclopedia of Aircraft

General characteristics

- Crew: 1
- Length: 14.9 m (49 ft 8.50 in)
- Wingspan: 15.15 m (49 ft 8.5 in)
- Height: 3.9 m (13 ft 3.25 in)
- Gross weight: 3,653 kg (8,053 lb)
- Powerplant: 1 × Renault 12Ma , 433 kW (580 hp)

Performance

- Maximum speed: 180 km/h (112 mph, 97 kn)
- Range: 700 km (435 mi, 378 nmi)
- Service ceiling: 2,454 m (8,052 ft)

Armament

- 1 x 7.7 mm (0.303 in) machine-gun
- 450Kg (992lb) Torpedo or bombs
