= Tellier =

Tellier is a surname. Notable people with the surname include:

- Charles Tellier (1828–1913), French compressed air engineer
- Edward Philip Tellier (1881–1932), Canadian politician
- Jean-Marc Tellier (born 1969), French politician
- Joseph-Mathias Tellier (1861–1952), Quebec Conservative Party politician
- Léon Tellier, French Olympic sailor
- Lionel Tellier (1905–1973), Canadian politician
- Louis Tellier (1842–1935), Canadian lawyer, politician, and judge
- Maurice Tellier (1896–1966), Canadian lawyer and politician
- Paul Tellier (born 1939), Canadian businessperson
- Ray Tellier (born 1951), American college athletics administrator
- Sébastien Tellier (born 1975), French singer, songwriter and multi-instrumentalist
- Sylvie Tellier (born 1978), Miss Lyon 2001
- Théodule Tellier (1856–1922), French printer

== See also ==
- Le Tellier
- Teillier
