= Aero A.29 =

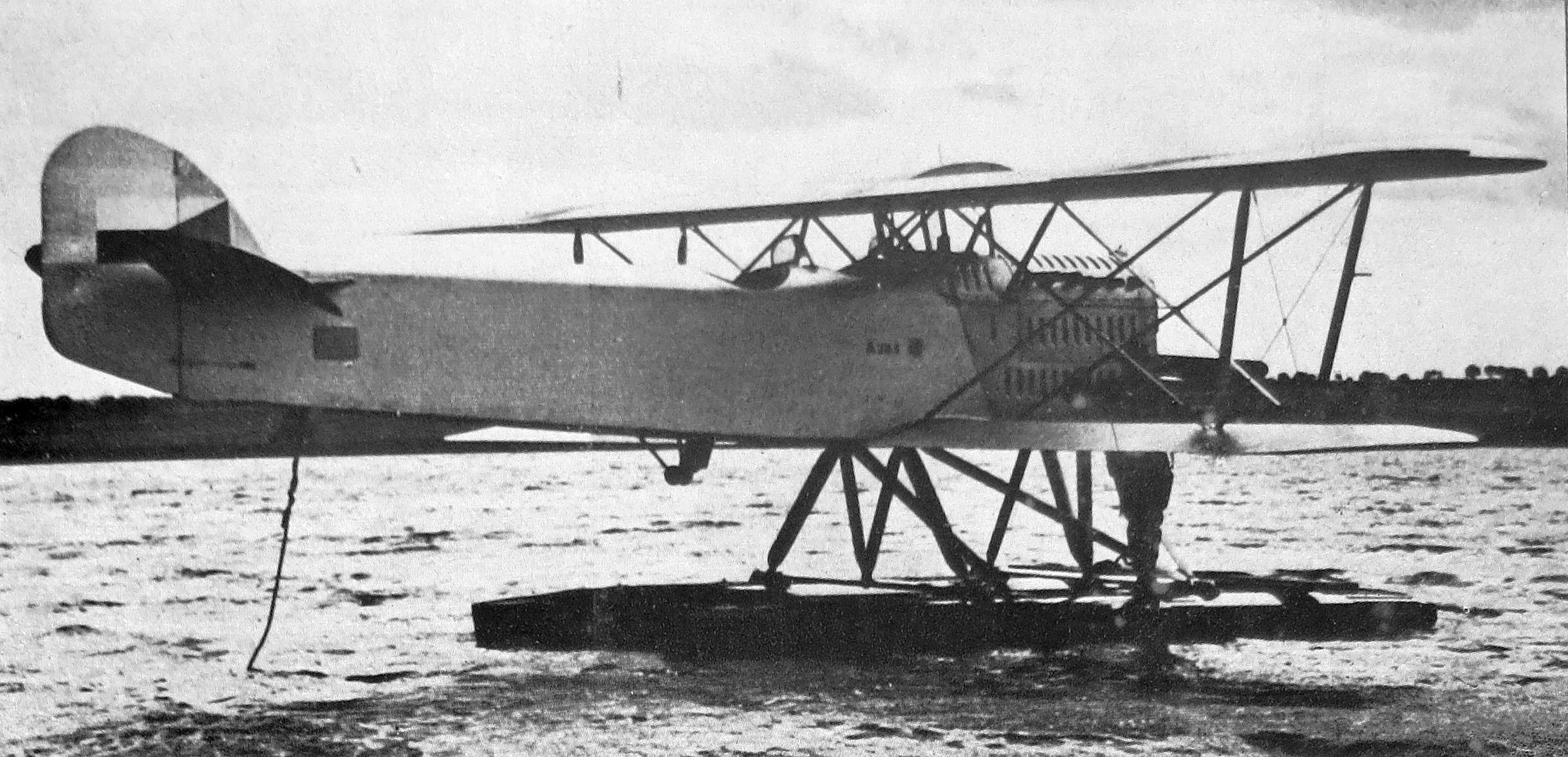
- Aero A.29

General information
- Type: Floatplane
- Manufacturer: Aero Vodochody
- Primary user: Czechoslovak Air Force
- Number built: 9

History
- Introduction date: 1927
- First flight: 05 October 1926
- Retired: 1936

The Aero A.29 was a military biplane developed in Czechoslovakia from the ubiquitous Aero A.11 reconnaissance-bomber. Aero equipped it with floats and it served as a target tug for training anti-aircraft gunners.

== Variants ==
The A.29 was built with two engine types:

Breitfeld & Danek Perun II
1927, 5 built.
Walter W-IV
1930, 4 built

== Specifications (A.29) ==
General characteristics

- Crew: 2, pilot and observer
- Length: 9 m (29 ft 6 in)
- Wingspan: 12.8 m (42 ft 0 in)
- Height: 3.1 m (10 ft 2 in)
- Wing area: 36.5 m^{2} (393 sq ft)
- Empty weight: 1,298 kg (2,862 lb)
- Gross weight: 1,677 kg (3,697 lb)
- Powerplant: 1 × Breitfeld & Danek Perun II 6-cyl. water-cooled in-line piston engine, 180 kW (240 hp)

Performance

- Maximum speed: 196 km/h (122 mph, 106 kn)
- Cruise speed: 150 km/h (93 mph, 81 kn)
- Service ceiling: 6,700 m (22,000 ft)
- Rate of climb: 1.74 m/s (343 ft/min)
- Wing loading: 46 kg/m^{2} (9.4 lb/sq ft)
- Power/mass: 0.110 kW/kg (0.07 hp/lb)

Armament

- Guns: 1x 7.70 mm (0.303 in) vz.09 machine gun, 2x 7.70 mm (0.303 in) vz.15 machine guns

== See also ==
Related development A.11 - A.12 - A.21 - A.22 - A.25
