= Aero A.100 =

Light bomber and reconnaissance aircraft by Aero Vodochody

A.100
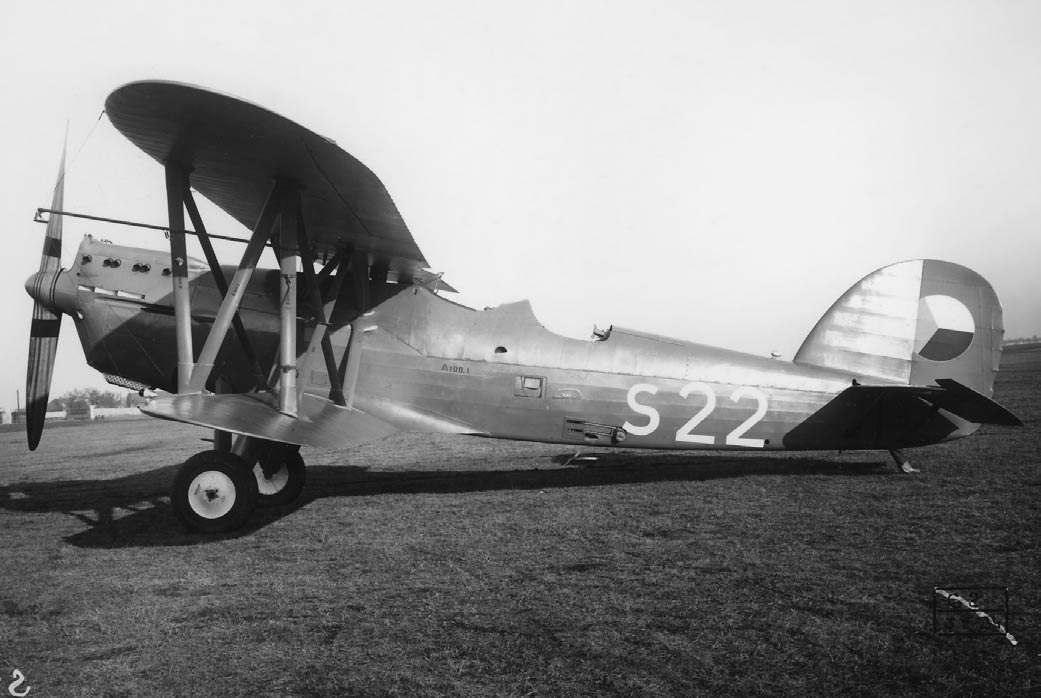

General information
- Type: Light bomber Reconnaissance aircraft
- National origin: Czechoslovakia
- Manufacturer: Aero Vodochody
- Primary user: Czechoslovak Air Force
- Number built: 44

History
- Manufactured: 1933-1935
- First flight: 1933
- Retired: late 1940s

The Aero A.100 was a biplane light bomber and reconnaissance aircraft built in Czechoslovakia during the 1930s. It was the final step in a design lineage that extended back to the Aero A.11 a decade earlier. A.100s remained in service throughout World War II and for a few years postwar.

== Design and development ==
Development of the A.100 was in response to a Czechoslovak Air Force requirement of 1932 for a uniform replacement for the Aero A.230s, Aero Ap.32s, and Letov Š.16s light bombers and reconnaissance aircraft then in service. Work began with a further revision of the Aero A.30, the Aero A.430, which incorporated little of the original designs from which it had been evolved and was soon redesignated Aero A.100, in a new numbering sequence just introduced by Aero.

The A.100 was a single-engined biplane of mixed wood and metal construction with a fixed conventional landing gear. The aircraft's fuselage was elliptical section, and had a steel tube structure covered in duralumin panels. The unequal-span wings were of wooden construction with fabric covering. Of standard biplane configuration, the A.100 was a somewhat ungainly-looking aircraft which was obsolescent by the time of its first flight in 1933, becoming a member of the final generation of biplane military aircraft to be designed in Europe.

== Operational history ==
Nevertheless, since the only other competitor for the air force contract, the Praga E.36, had not flown by the close of tenders, the A.100 was ordered for production. A total of 44 were built, in two batches.

== Further development ==
The Aero A.100 was later developed into Aero A.101 with Praga Isotta Fraschini Asso 1000 RV engine (800 h.p.), first flying in December 1934, this type served in the Spanish Civil War curiously on both sides of the conflict. Further development led to Aero Ab.101 (enlarged hull and wings plus Avia Hispano Suiza HS 12 Ydrs engine rated 860 h.p.) produced from 1936 to 1937 and serving in the Czechoslovak Air Force up to its dissolution in March 1939. Final stage of the development was Aero A.104, where Ab.101 was converted to a high-wing monoplane with enclosed cockpit, only one prototype was built in 1937.

== Specifications (A.100) ==
Data from

General characteristics

- Crew: 2
- Length: 11.08 m (36 ft 4 in)
- Wingspan: 14.7 m (48 ft 3 in)
- Height: 3.6 m (11 ft 10 in)
- Wing area: 44.3 m^{2} (477 sq ft)
- Empty weight: 2,040 kg (4,497 lb)
- Gross weight: 3,220 kg (7,099 lb)
- Max takeoff weight: 3,219 kg (7,097 lb)
- Powerplant: 1 × Avia Vr.36 V-12 water-cooled piston engine, 552 kW (740 hp)

Performance

- Maximum speed: 270 km/h (170 mph, 150 kn)
- Range: 900 km (560 mi, 490 nmi)
- Service ceiling: 6,500 m (21,300 ft)
- Rate of climb: 4.2 m/s (830 ft/min)
- Wing loading: 73 kg/m^{2} (15 lb/sq ft)
- Power/mass: 0.170 kW/kg (0.103 hp/lb)

Armament

- Guns:
  - 2× forward-firing 7.92 mm (0.312 in) vz. 30 (Česká zbrojovka Strakonice) machine guns
  - 2× 7.92 mm vz. 30 (Česká zbrojovka Strakonice) machine guns in a ring mount for the observer
- Bombs: 600 kg (1,300 lb)

== Operators ==
Czechoslovakia

- Czechoslovak Air Force

Germany

- Luftwaffe (small numbers)

Slovakia

- Slovak Air Force (1939–1945)

== See also ==
Related development

- Aero A.430
- Aero A.101

Related lists

- List of bomber aircraft
- List of interwar military aircraft

== Bibliography ==
- Green, William (1967). War Planes of the Second World War: Volume Seven - Bombers and Reconnaissance Aircraft. London: Macdonald.
- Ketley, Barry; Rolfe, Mark (1996). Luftwaffe Fledglings 1935-1945: Luftwaffe Training Units and their Aircraft. Aldershot, UK: Hikoki Publications. ISBN 978-0-9519899-2-0.
- Kliment, Charles K.; Nakládal, Břetislav (1997). Germany's First Ally: Armed Forces of the Slovak State 1939 – 1934. Atglen, Pennsylvania, US: Schiffer Publishing Ltd. ISBN 0-7643-0589-1.
- Krumbach, Jan (1974). "Monografie: Aero A.100". Letectví + Kosmontautika (in Czech). Vol. L, no. 21. pp. 825–828.
- Sharpe, Michael (2000). Biplanes, Triplanes, and Seaplanes. London: Friedman/Fairfax Books. ISBN 1-58663-300-7..
- Taylor, John W. R.; Alexander, Jean (1969). Combat Aircraft of the World. New York: G. P. Putnam's Sons. ISBN 0-71810-564-8.
- Taylor, Michael J. H., ed. (1989). Jane's Encyclopedia of Aviation. London: Bracken Books. ISBN 1-85170-324-1.
