= Aero A.22 =

General information
- Type: Utility aircraft
- Manufacturer: Aero Vodochody
- Primary user: Czechoslovakia

The Aero A.22 was a Czechoslovak biplane civil utility aircraft based on the Aero A.12 reconnaissance-bomber. The observer's position was replaced by seating for two passengers.

== Specifications (A.22) ==
Data from European Transport Aircraft since 1910

General characteristics

- Crew: 1
- Capacity: 2 passengers
- Length: 8.3 m (27 ft 3 in)
- Wingspan: 12.8 m (42 ft 0 in)
- Wing area: 36.9 m^{2} (397 sq ft)
- Empty weight: 1,105 kg (2,436 lb)
- Gross weight: 1,415 kg (3,120 lb)
- Powerplant: 1 × Walter 6-cylinder water-cooled in-line piston engine, 160 kW (220 hp)

Performance

- Maximum speed: 200 km/h (120 mph, 110 kn)
- Cruise speed: 175 km/h (109 mph, 94 kn)
- Range: 750 km (470 mi, 400 nmi)
- Service ceiling: 7,650 m (25,100 ft)

== See also ==
Related development

- Aero A.11
- Aero A.12
- Aero A.21
- Aero A.25
- Aero A.29
