= Aero Vodochody =

Czech aircraft manufacturer

AERO Vodochody AEROSPACE a.s.
- Type: Akciová společnost
- Industry: Aerospace, arms Industry
- Predecessor: Aero – továrna létadel
- Founded: February 25, 1919; 107 years ago
- Headquarters: Odolena Voda, Central Bohemian Region, Czech Republic
- Area served: Worldwide
- Key people: Viktor Sotona (president and CEO)
- Products: Aircraft, aircraft parts
- Services: MRO, pilot training, airport
- Revenue: 6,007,323,000 Czech koruna (2024)
- Operating income: 285,950,000 Czech koruna (2024)
- Net income: 102,264,000 Czech koruna (2024)
- Total assets: 9,076,815,000 Czech koruna (2024)
- Total equity: ▼CZK -1.2 bn. (2020)
- Number of employees: 1,336 (2020)
- Parent: N7 Holding National Defence Industry Innovation PLC
- Subsidiaries: Aero (1929–1947)
- Website: www.aero.cz

Aero Vodochody (commonly referred to as Aero) is a Czech aircraft company. Its main production facilities are located at Vodochody Airport in the Prague-East District, on the municipal territories of Vodochody and Odolena Voda.

During the Cold War era, the firm was well known for its range of jet-powered trainer aircraft, the L-29 Delfin and L-39 Albatros. It also developed derivatives of the L-39, the L-59 Super Albatros and the L-159 ALCA military light combat jet. Aero Vodochody is believed to have handled the biggest aircraft industrial programme to take place across any of the Council for Mutual Economic Assistance (COMECON) countries except for the Soviet Union itself. Following the fall of the communist government in Czechoslovakia during 1989, Aero Vodochody experienced a disruptive period of business, having lost a major portion of the market for its jet trainers. Sales noticeably declined during the 1990s in Eastern Europe as well as in NATO countries as a result of the peace dividend.

Between 1998 and 2004, Aero Vodochody was controlled by the American aerospace company Boeing. During October 2006, the company was privatised once again, being bought by Czech-Slovak investment group Penta Investments for roughly 3 billion CZK. Aero Vodochody continues to manufacture both whole aircraft and aerostructures for the aerospace industry. During the 2014 Farnborough Airshow, it announced the launch of the Aero L-39 Skyfox, an upgraded and modernised version of its ubiquitous L-39.

In 2021, Penta Investments sold their business share to the HSC Aerojet Zrt.

== History ==
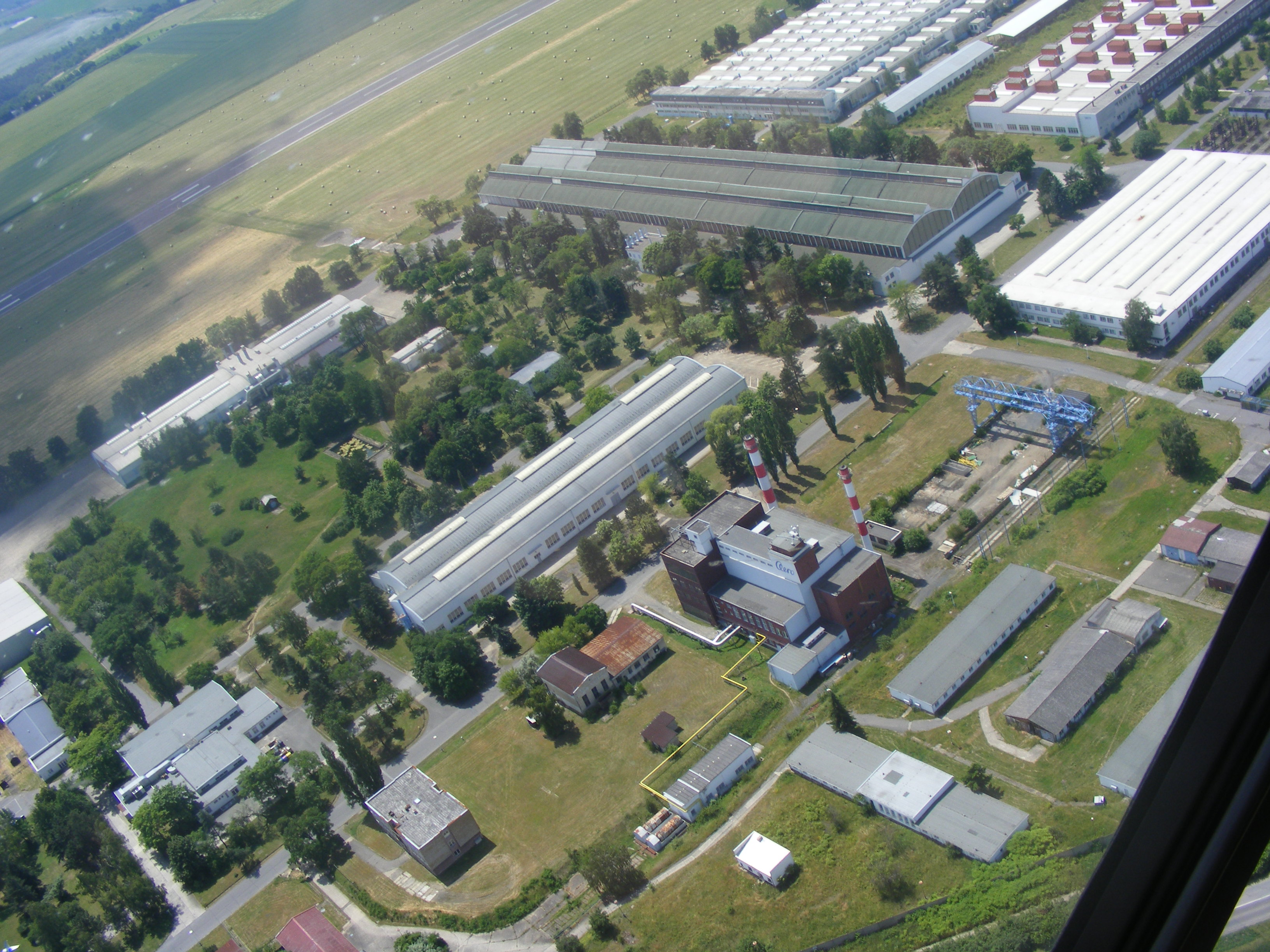
The factory at Vodochody Airport

Aero Vodochody has been active since its founding in 1919. Between 1929 and 1951, its subsidiary, Aero, manufactured a range of small and medium-sized cars with two-stroke engines, it also briefly produced the Škoda 150 truck between 1946 and 1947 under licence.

During the 1950s, Aero Vodochody developed the L-29 Delfin trainer aircraft; it was Czechoslovakia's first indigenously designed jet-powered aircraft. The L-29 is believed to have likely been the biggest aircraft industrial programme to take place across any of the Council for Mutual Economic Assistance (COMECON) countries except for the Soviet Union itself. During the course of the programme, in excess of 3,000 L-29s were produced; of these, around 2,000 were reported to have been delivered to the Soviet Union, where it served as the standard trainer for the Soviet Air Force. Of the others, which included both armed and unarmed models, many aircraft were delivered to the various COMECON countries while others were exported to various overseas nations, including Egypt, Syria, Indonesia, Nigeria and Uganda. Reportedly, the type has been used in active combat during several instances, perhaps the most high-profile being the Nigerian Civil War of the late 1960s and of Egyptian L-29s against Israeli tanks during the brief Yom Kippur War of 1973.

The L-39 Albatros was designed during the 1960s as a replacement for the Aero L-29 Delfín as a principal training aircraft. Several specialised variants of the base L-39 design were quickly introduced. In 1972, a purpose-built target tug variant, the L-39V, conducted its initial flight. During 1975, the first L-39ZO training/light combat model, which was equipped with four underwing hardpoints as well as a strengthened wing and modified landing gear, performed its first flight. In 1977, the first L-39ZA light combat variant, which was fitted with a single Gryazev-Shipunov GSh-23 cannon mounted underneath the fuselage in addition to the four hardpoints and strengthening of the L-39ZO, made its maiden flight. According to aerospace publication Flight International, roughly 200 L-39s were being sold each year upon the jet trainer market during the late 1980s. Sales of the L-39 declined during the 1990s. This downturn has been attributed to the loss of the captive Warsaw Pact trainer market, to which a substantial proportion of the total aircraft manufactured had been historically sold to; allegations about Czechoslovak banks being unable to finance the defense industry and inaction on the part of the Czechoslovak government; and concerns over the quality of manufacturing standards. During 1996, production of the L-39 was terminated.

Aero Vodochody has developed several improved variants of the L-39 to take its place, and has continued extensive support and overhaul operations for existing L-39 customers. The L-59 Super Albatros was derived from the L-39, being originally designated as the L-39MS. Aero only produced a handful of L-59s before discontinuing production. Another derivative of the L-39 Albatros was the L-159 ALCA, a modernised combat-oriented version. Originally, Aero Vodochody had intended to develop the L-159 in partnership with Elbit, but the Czech Ministry of Defense instead selected Rockwell Collins to partner on the program.

During the 2010s, Aero Vodochody was engaged in the manufacture of the L-159 advanced light combat aircraft and the Sikorsky S-76 helicopter. It has also an active presence in the aerostructures sector, producing the center wing box of the Alenia C-27J Spartan airlifter, door subassemblies for the Embraer 170 and Embraer 190 airliners, the cockpit of the Sikorsky UH-60 Black Hawk helicopter, gun bay doors for the Boeing F/A-18E/F Super Hornet fighter, subassemblies and various elements of the Airbus A320 family airliner, and fixed leading edge kits for the Boeing 767 airliner. The company is reportedly likely to upgrade the runway at its Vodochody Airport near Prague to international airport standards, allowing it to better serve the low-cost air carriers and charter flights that service Prague.

During July 2014, Aero Vodochody presented the L-39NG (Skyfox) programme at the Farnborough Airshow. By April 2015, a partnership had formed between Aero Vodochody, American defence contractor Draken International and engine manufacturer Williams International to undertake the programme and to properly prepare the L-39NG to compete on the North American market. The L-39NG is being developed and marketed in two stages. The L-39NG upgrade program (Stage 1) contains an installation of FJ44-4M engine and optionally the Stage 2 avionics to existing L-39 Albatros. The second phase (Stage 2) represents newly built L-39NG aircraft with the possible use of components from the previous upgrade to Stage 1, once the original airframe reaches the end of its life. The first stage was formally completed om 14 September 2015 with the maiden flight of the L-39NG technology demonstrator (L-39CW). On 20 November 2017, Aero Vodochody announced the completion of development of the L-39CW; on 14 March 2018, they announced that the L-39CW, equipped with both the new engine and the new avionics, had received type certification. The brand new L-39NG aircraft made first flight on December 22, 2018. in September 2020, less than two years later, the aircraft was certified by the Military Aviation Authority of the Ministry of Defence of the Czech Republic.

In September 2021, the Aero Vodochody sale transaction was successfully completed. Based on an agreement signed in July 2021, Hungarian company HSC Aerojet Zrt. became the 100 per cent owner of Aero. In HSC Aerojet Zrt., an 80 per cent majority is held by Hungarian businessman Kristóf Szalay-Bobrovniczky and a minority is held by Czech company OMNIPOL a.s. The sale also included Vodochody Airport. In 2022, after becoming Minister of Defence of Hungary, Szalay-Bobrovniczky sold his share to Zsolt Hernádi, chairman and CEO of MOL. In October 2022 Zsolt transferred his share to N7 Holding National Defence Industrial Innovation Ltd In September 2022, some Hungarian oligarchs, namely Zsolt Hernádi, Oszkár Világi, deputy CEO of MOL, György Bacsa, director of MOL Hungary, and Árpád Habony, spin doctor of prime minister Viktor Orbán, were indirect owners. At present 75% of the shares are held by a private company, 4iG, managed by Gellért Jászai

== Aircraft ==
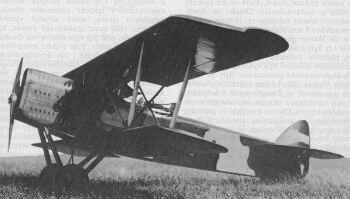
Aero A-11

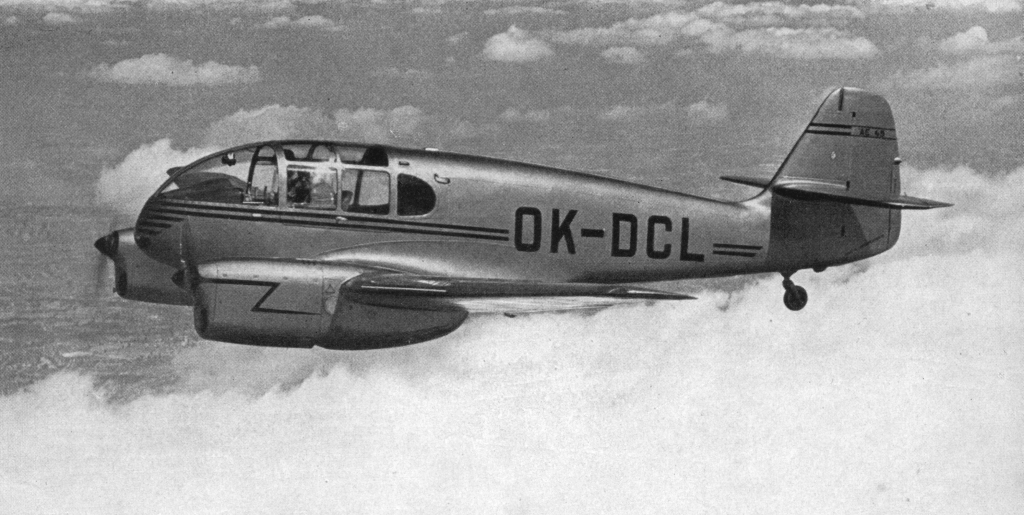
Aero Ae-45

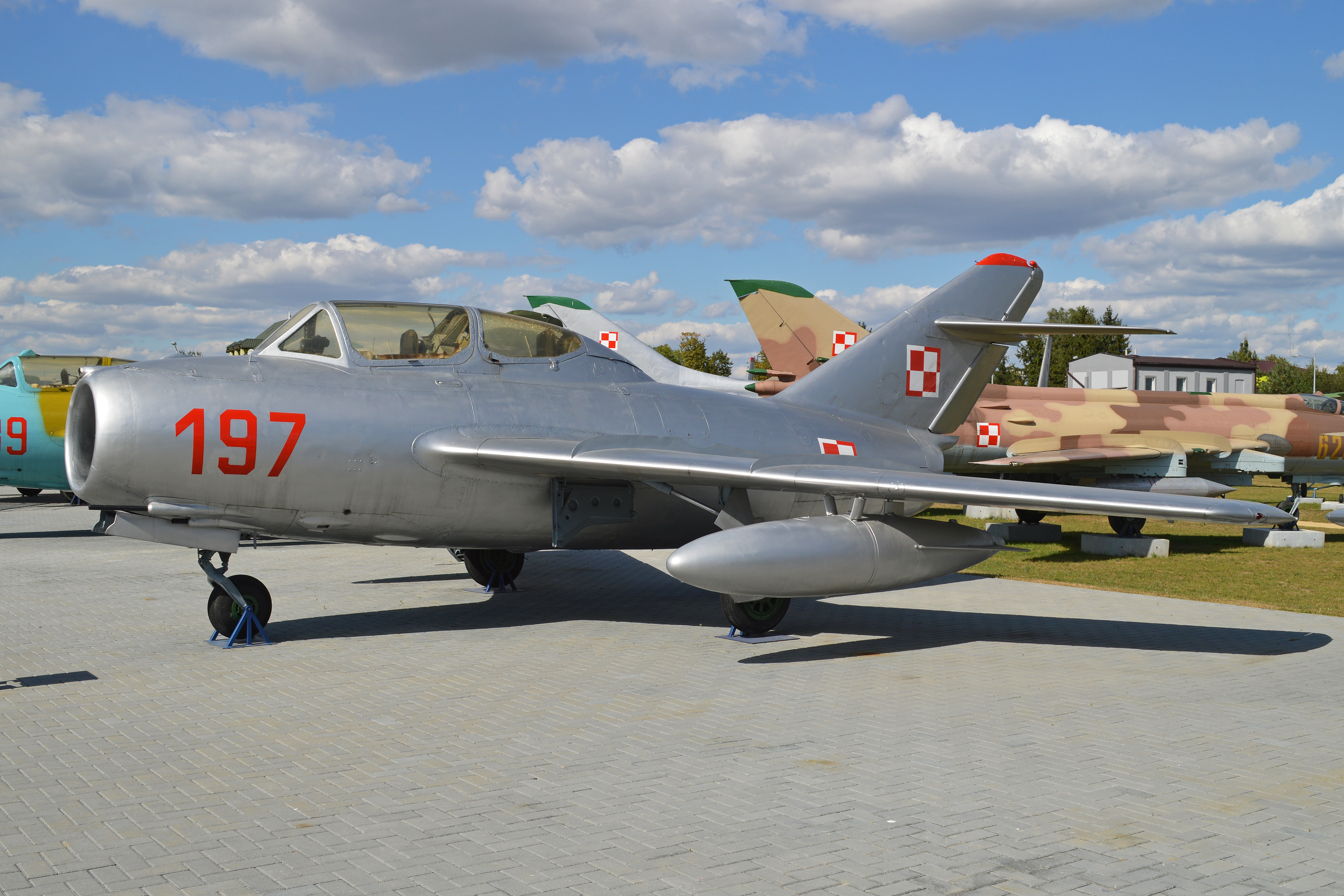
Aero CS-102

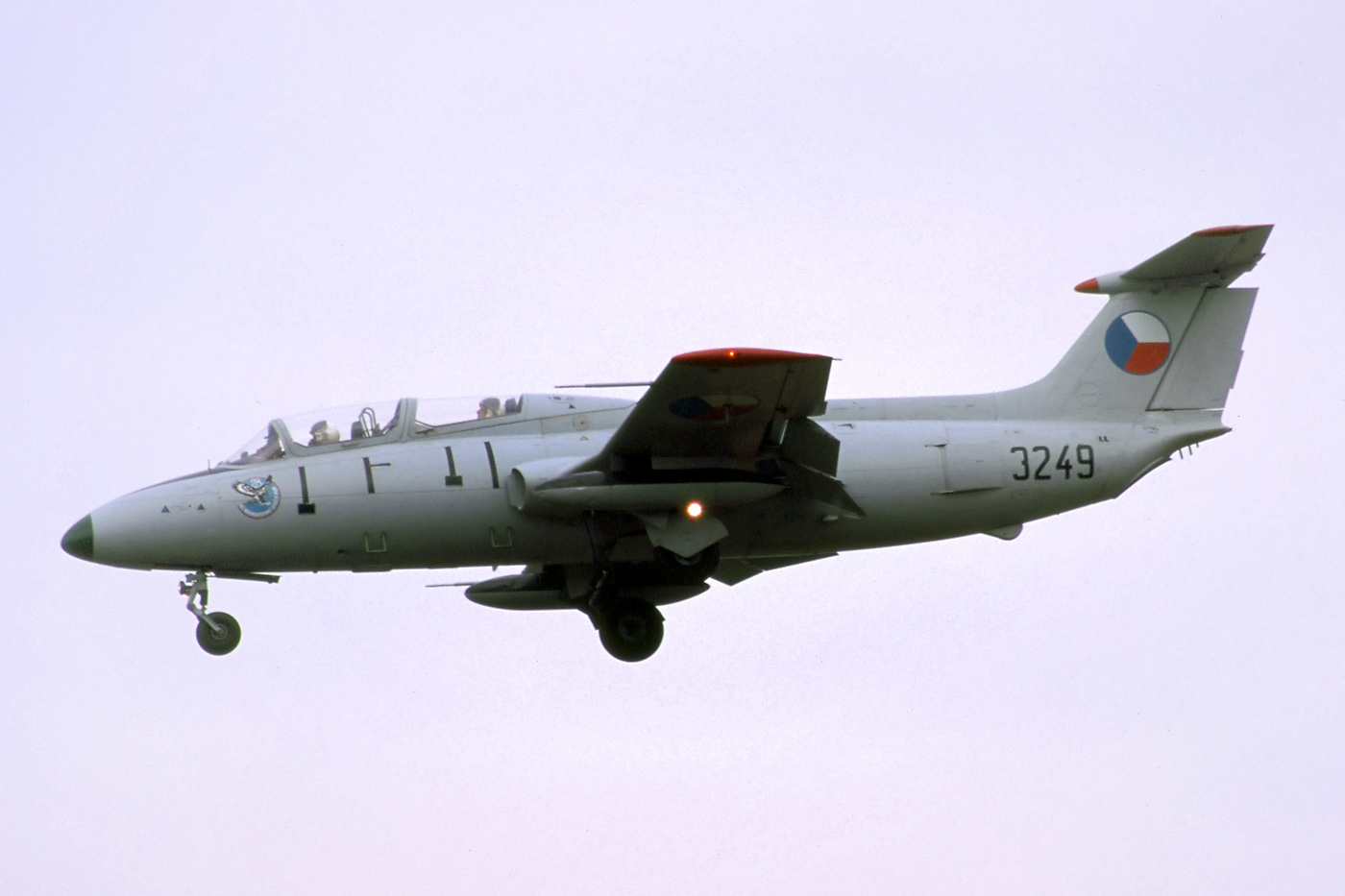
Aero L-29 Delfín

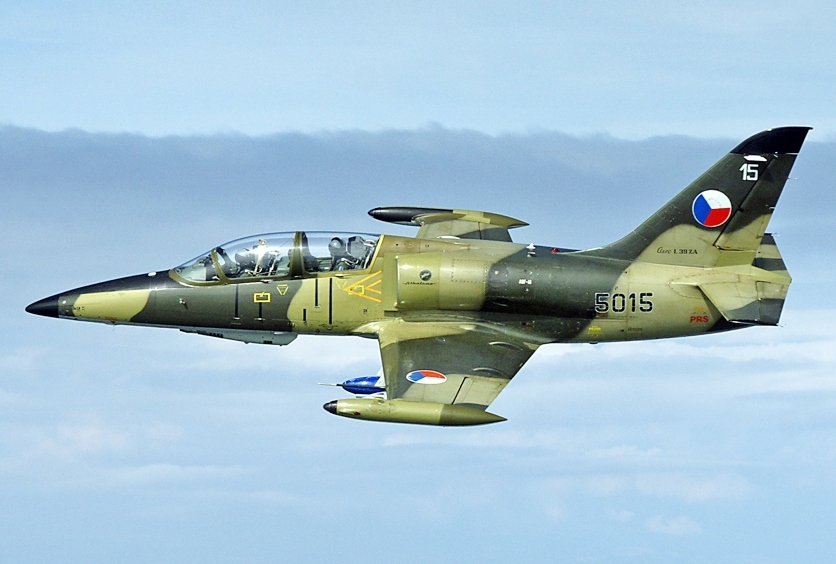
Aero L-39 Albatros

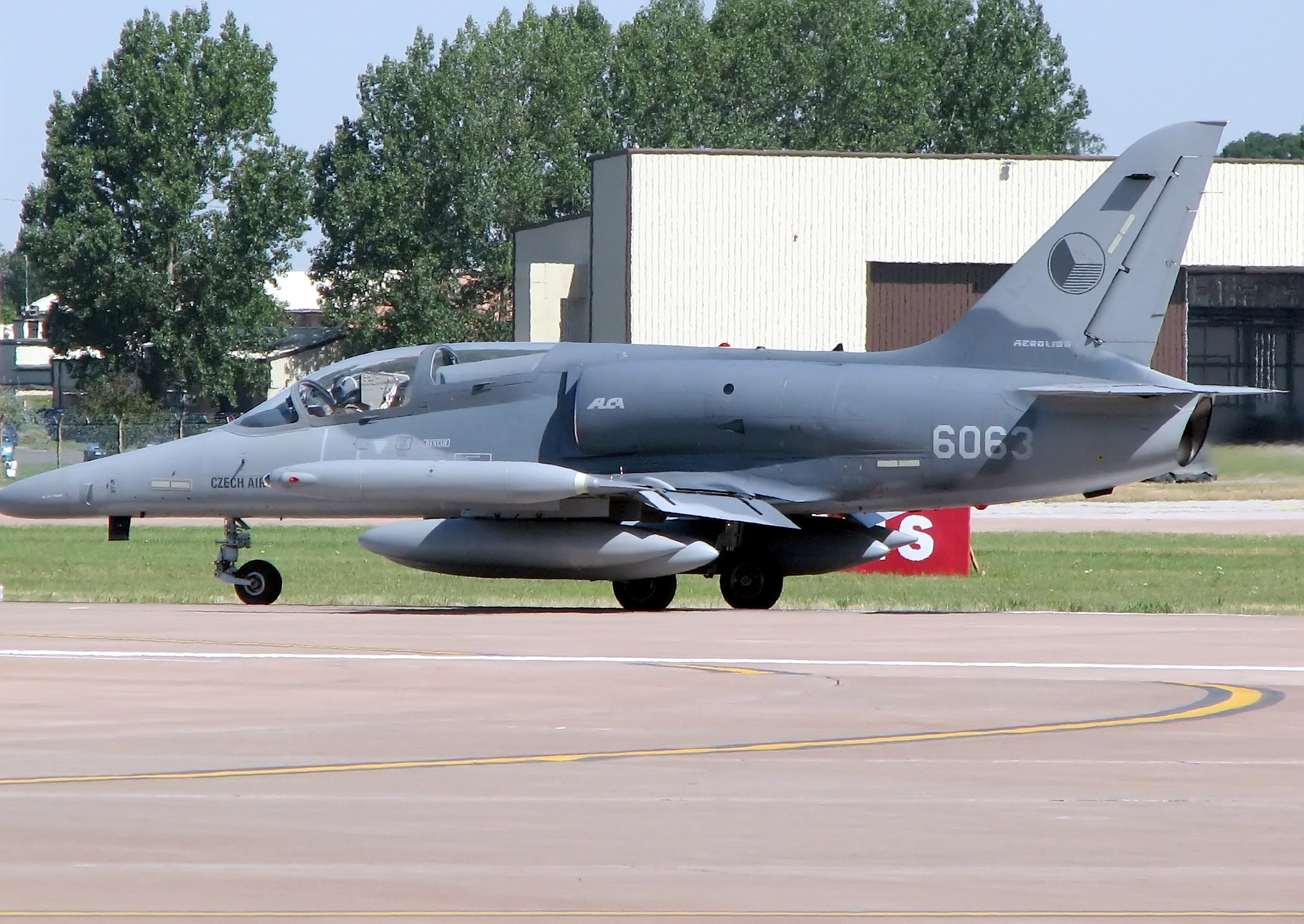
Aero Vodochody L-159A ALCA

Model name	First flight	Number built	Type
Aero Ae 01	1919	35	Single engine biplane trainer; Hansa-Brandenburg B.I built under license
Aero Ae 02	1920	1	Single engine biplane fighter
Aero Ae 03		1	Single engine monoplane reconnaissance airplane; cancelled while still incomplete
Aero Ae 04	1921		Single engine biplane fighter developed from the Ae 02
Aero A.8	1921	1	Single engine biplane airliner
Aero A.10	1922	5	Single engine biplane airliner
Aero A.11	1925	~250	Single engine biplane light bomber
Aero A.12	1923	93	Single engine biplane light bomber
Aero A.14	1922	25	Single engine biplane reconnaissance airplane
Aero A.15	1923	24	A.14 with a Hiero L engine
Aero DH.50	1925	7	Single-engine biplane airliner; de Havilland DH.50 built under license
Aero A.16			Single engine biplane night bomber project
Aero A.17	1922		Single-seat glider
Aero A.18	1923	20	Single engine biplane fighter
Aero A.19			Single engine biplane fighter project; cancelled in favor of the A.18
Aero A.20	1923	1	Prototype single engine biplane fighter; cancelled in favor of the A.18
Aero A.21	1926	8	Single engine biplane night trainer developed from the A.11
Aero A.22	1924	3	Single engine biplane utility airplane based on the A.12
Aero A.22 (II)			Four engine heavy bomber project (1924)
Aero A.23	1926	7	Single engine biplane airliner
Aero A.24	1925	1	Prototype twin engine biplane bomber
Aero A.25	1925	15	Single engine two-seat biplane day trainer developed from the A.11
Aero A.26	1923	23	Single engine biplane reconnaissance airplane
Aero A.27			Twin engine biplane bomber project
Aero A.27 (II)			Twin engine, 12 passenger airliner project
Aero A.28			Two-seat trainer
Aero A.29	1926	9	Single engine biplane reconnaissance floatplane developed from the A.11
Aero A.30	1926	79	Single engine biplane light bomber based on the A.11
Aero A.31			Single-seat fighter project
Aero A.32	1927	116	Single engine, two-seat army co-operation biplane
Aero A.33			Three engine, 14 passenger biplane airliner project (1928)
Aero A.34 Kos	1929	11	Single engine biplane sport airplane
Aero A.35	1928	12	Single engine high-wing monoplane airliner
Aero A.36			Three-engine biplane bomber project (1926)
Aero A.38	1929	6	Single engine, 10 seat biplane airliner
Aero A.40			Racing biplane project (1926)
Aero A.42	1929	2	Single engine, high-wing monoplane bomber
Aero A.44			Twin-engine monoplane heavy bomber project (1931)
Aero A.46	1931	1	Single engine, two-seat biplane trainer
Aero A.48			8-seat, three-engine, high-wing monoplane airliner project (1932)
Aero A.49			Two-seat, parasol wing ultralight aircraft; lost to the Letov S-39
Aero A.55			Single-engine ultralight aircraft project
Aero A.60			Three-engine, low-wing cantilever monoplane airliner project (1931)
Aero A.100	1933	44	Single engine, two-seat biplane reconnaissance/light bomber
Aero A.101	1934	30	Single engine, two-seat biplane reconnaissance/light bomber
Aero Ab.101	1936	65	Single engine, two-seat biplane reconnaissance/light bomber
Aero A.102	1934	2	Prototype single engine, single-seat high gull wing monoplane fighter; lost to the Avia B.35
Aero A.104	1937	2	Prototype single engine, two-seat parasol wing light bomber monoplane
Aero A.125		12	A.25 with a Breitfield & Danek Perun I engine
Aero A.130		1	Prototype version of A.30 with a Walter-built Bristol Jupiter engine
Aero A.134	1934	1	Prototype version of A.34 with a Walter NZ 85 radial engine
Aero A.200	1934	2	Single engine, four-seat low-wing sportsplane
Aero MB.200	1935	74	Twin-engine monoplane bomber; Bloch MB.200 built under license
Aero A.202			Twin-engine, 14 passenger cantilever low-wing monoplane airliner project; rival to Avia 57
Aero A.204	1936	1	Prototype twin-engine, 8 passenger low-wing monoplane airliner
Aero A.206			Twin-engine monoplane reconnaissance/light bomber based on A.204
Aero A.210			Four-engine airliner project; similar to A.202
Aero A.212			Twin-engine utility aircraft project (1937); Ae 45 precursor but with more conventional appearance
Aero A.230		25	Production version of A.30
Aero A.300	1938	1	Twin-engine low-wing medium bomber derived from the A.304
Aero A.302			Two-seat, low-wing fighter/ground attack monoplane project
Aero A.304	1937	19	Twin-engine monoplane bomber based on A.204
Aero A.321			Attack version of A.32 for Finland
Aero A.330			A.30 with Praga ESV engine
Aero A.351			A.35 development
Aero A.404			Twin-engine monoplane bomber project based on A.304
Aero A.430			Initial designation for the A.100
Aero C-3			Twin-engine monoplane trainer; Siebel Si 204 built under license
Aero C-4/C-104			Single-engine biplane trainer; Bücker Bü 131 built under license
Aero C-103			Airliner version of C-3
Aero D-44			Military transport variant of C-3
Aero Ae-45	1947	200	Twin-engine monoplane utility airplane
Aero Ae 50	1949	1	Single-engine monoplane reconnaissance airplane
Aero Ae-53			High-wing assault glider project (1953)
Aero Ae-58			Twin-engine, low-wing 8-12 passenger light transport monoplane project
Aero Ae-145 (I)			Projected larger five-seat derivative of Ae-45 with Walter Minor 6-III engines and tricycle landing gear (1948–1949)
Aero Ae-145 (II)	1959		Version of Ae 45 with supercharged Motorlet M332 engines
Aero Ae-148			Twin-engine, 12 passenger airliner project (1949)
Aero Ae-245			Ae 145 (II) with a tailwheel; only a project
Aero Ae-345			Ae 45 airframe with Walter Minor 6-III engines; only a project
LB P-1			Twin engine, low-wing high-speed trainer/courier; development of Hodek HK.101
LB P-3			Assault and training transport glider project; developed into the Ae-53
LB P-16			Four-engine, low-wing medium transport monoplane project (1951)
Aero B-34			Low-wing, jet attack aircraft project
Aero HC-2 Heli Baby	1954	23	Single-engine utility helicopter
Aero L-60 Brigadýr	1953	273	Single-engine monoplane utility airplane
Aero L-260			High-wing, 10-seat multipurpose aircraft project (1970)
Aero L-29 Delfín	1959	3,665	Single jet engine monoplane trainer
Aero L-229			Single-seat light attack version of L-29; only a project
Aero L-260			Derivative of L-60 with Praga M-208D engine
Aero L-360			Single-engine monoplane utility airplane
Aero L-429			Single jet engine monoplane aerobatic airplane
Aero S-102		821	Single-engine jet fighter; Mikoyan-Gurevich MiG-15 built under license
Aero S-103		620	Single-engine jet fighter; Mikoyan-Gurevich MiG-15bis built under license
Aero S-104			Single-engine jet fighter; Mikoyan-Gurevich MiG-17 built under license
Aero S-105		103	Twin-engine fighter; Mikoyan-Gurevich MiG-19 built under license
Aero S-106		194	Single-engine fighter; Mikoyan-Gurevich MiG-21 built under license
Aero L-39 Albatros	1968	2,900	Single jet engine monoplane trainer
Aero L-270			Single engine utility airplane
Aero L-59 Super Albatros	1986	71	Single jet engine monoplane trainer developed from the L-39
Aero Ae 270 Spirit	2000		Single turboprop engine monoplane utility airplane
Aero L-159 ALCA	1997	72	Single jet engine monoplane light attack airplane
Aero L-39 Skyfox	2018	32	Single jet engine monoplane trainer
Aero F/A-259 Striker			Single jet engine monoplane attack airplane

== See also ==
- Aero (automobile)
- Avia
- Beneš-Mráz
- Aircraft Industries
- Letov Kbely
- Zlin Aircraft
