= Aero A.101 =

Light bomber and reconnaissance aircraft

A.101
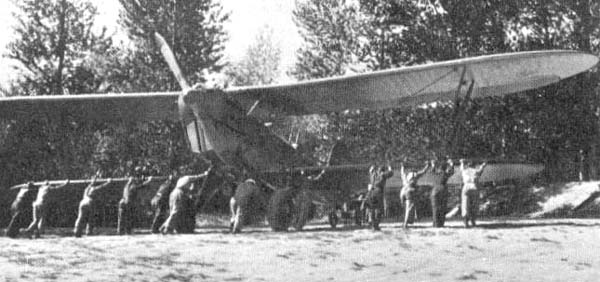

General information
- Type: Light bomber Reconnaissance aircraft
- Manufacturer: Aero Vodochody
- Number built: 95

History
- Manufactured: 1930s
- First flight: 12 December 1934

The Aero A.101 was a biplane light bomber and reconnaissance aircraft built in Czechoslovakia during the 1930s. 30 A.101s were built for the Czechoslovak Air Force in 1935–1936. The Spanish Civil War resulted in the surviving 28 aircraft being sold to the Spanish Republican forces in 1937, but a ship carrying some of the A.101s was captured by the Nationalists on the way to Spain, resulting in the type being used by both the Republican and Nationalist sides of the war. 65 more examples of a revised version, the Ab.101, were built for the Czechoslovak Air Force from 1937, and served until the German invasion in March 1939.

== Design and development ==
In 1933, the Czechoslovak Air Force had a requirement to replace ageing bombers such as the Letov Š-16 and Aero A.30, and so issued a requirement for an improved version of the Aero A.100. The new aircraft, the Aero A.101, was required to use Isotta Fraschini Asso 800 W18 engines that had been built under license by ČKD-Praga for the unsuccessful Aero A.42 monoplane bomber, instead of the license-built Hispano-Suiza 12N used by the A.100. Like the Aero A.100 upon which it was based, the A.101 was a single-engined biplane of mixed metal and wood construction, with a fixed conventional landing gear. The unequal-span single-bay wings had a wooden structure, with fabric covering over most of the wings while the leading edges were clad in plywood. The fuselage had a welded steel-tube structure. The A.101 had increased span wings and a lengthened fuselage compared to the A.100. While the Asso engine was more powerful (with a rating of 600–750 kW (800–1,000 hp) compared to 485–541 kW (650–725 hp) for the Hispano-Suiza engine), it was significantly heavier.

The prototype was completed in November 1934, and made its first flight on 12 December 1934. An order for 29 production aircraft followed in January 1935. While testing was generally successful, the use of a heavy and obsolete engine was soon recognised as a mistake by the Czechoslovak Ministry of Defence, while changes to the aircraft's specification during testing, including increasing the required bombload, and using larger tyres to increase standardisation, led to reductions in the aircraft's performance, which was disappointing.

In March 1935, the Czechoslovak Ministry of Defence issued a requirement for a revised version of the A.101, the Aero Ab.101, to be powered by a Hispano-Suiza 12Ydrs engine, which promised improved performance. An order for a prototype and 24 production aircraft was issued in September 1935. The Ab.101 was longer than the A.101, in order to maintain the aircraft's centre of gravity with the lighter Hispano-Suiza engine, while maximum bombload increased to 1100 kg. The prototype Ab-101 made its first flight on 25 March 1936. Factory testing revealed a number of problems, particularly associated with the aircraft's radiator and oil cooler. The prototype was finally accepted by the Czechoslovak Ministry of Defense on 5 October 1936. While the performance of the new type was no better than the A-101, there were no better alternatives that were available within the required timescales, and a second order for 40 more Ab-101s was placed. These had only minor changes from the first series, with the pilot's instruments being revised, with an artificial horizon and gyrocompass from the US company Sperry being fitted.

In 1937, Aero built as a private venture (i.e. without an official order), a further revised version, the Aero A.104, which kept the same fuselage as the Ab.101, but had the lower wing removed to make the aircraft a high wing monoplane, and an enclosed cockpit provided for the crew. Testing was not successful, and no production followed.

== Service history ==
The A.101 entered service with the Czechoslovak Air Force from November 1935 to January 1936, with the 29 production aircraft and the prototype joining the 6th Air Regiment, equipping four squadrons (the 71st and 72nd Squadrons at Prague and the 73rd and 74th Squadrons at Hradec Králové). During 1936, two A.101s were destroyed in accidents, both as a result of engine failures, while the aircraft suffered from degradation of the plywood covering the wing leading edges, which required repair by Aero. Consideration was given to selling the A-101s to Romania, but the outbreak of the Spanish Civil War meant that the Spanish Republican government urgently needed aircraft from whatever country was willing to sell them.

On 23 January 1937, a contract was signed to sell the Spanish Republic all 28 remaining A-101s, together with 24 Letov Š-231 fighters and spare parts, using Estonia as an intermediary. (Note: Total contract price for the A.101s and Š.231s, together with spare parts and associated armament was CZK 70,108329.25, with CSK 884,299 per A.101, compared to a price of CSK 862,000 paid by the Czechoslovak government, which made a profit on each A.101 sold.) (Note: Further attempts were made by Czechoslovakia to sell surplus aircraft, including 10 Ab.101s, in 1938, but these plans did not come to fruition.) The first batch of A-101s arrived at the port of Gdynia, Poland on 27 February 1937, but did not leave port aboard the Panamanian-flagged freighter Hordena until 8 April. The delay meant that the presence of the Aeros and their destination was well known in Gdynia before Hordena departed port, and a Nationalist agent warned that the freighter was carrying arms for the Republicans. The Nationalist cruiser Almirante Cervera was ordered to intercept the freighter, and Almirante Cervera captured Hordena in the Bay of Biscay on 16 April 1937, with the freighter taken into Ferrol. (Note: The number of A.101s captured by the Nationalists aboard the Hordena differs between accounts. While some sources suggest 22 aircraft were captured, others state that considerably fewer, possibly 12 or less, were aboard.) The captured aircraft entered service with the Spanish Nationalist Air Force, where they were known as Oca (Goose) or Praga (after the engine manufacturer). The Nationalist A.101s took part in the Battle of Brunete in July 1937, and continued to be heavily used until the end of the war, although they were obsolete, with nine A.101s lost due to enemy action or acctidents. None were lost to Republican fighters, with the A.101s usually operating away from areas where they would face significant fighter opposition, while they were usually given a fighter escort. After the end of the Civil War, the remaining Nationalist A.101s were used for observer training for the Spanish Air Force, but wear and tear and spares shortages led in them quickly being withdrawn from service, with none in service by October 1940. Delivery of the remaining A-101s that had not been captured on the Hardena was delayed by the Nationalist capture of Santander, with the aircraft shipped to the French port of Bassens, Gironde, and further by the closure of the border between France and Spain, so they did not cross the border until May 1938. Owing to the small number available and the type's poor performance, they were not deployed at the front, but instead were used for coastal patrol over the Mediterranean. The last Republican A.101s were destroyed on the ground in air raids on 5 and 6 February 1939. (Note: Accounts of Republican use are confused by the fact that the Nationalists used the same nickname (Papagayo) for Republican operated A-101s and the vaguely similar Polikarpov R-5.)

The first batch of Ab.101s were delivered from January to May 1937, with the second batch following from August 1937. Most of the Ab-101s went to the 5th Air Regiment, where they equipped three squadrons (the 75th 76th and 77th Squadrons). During the Munich crisis, the Ab.101 was the most numerous bomber in Czechoslovak service. The 5th Air Regiment's Ab-101s were deployed to airfields in western Slovakia and southern Moravia to guard against a potential attack from Hungary, as they were not considered adequate to face the German Luftwaffe. During this deployment, the Ab.101 proved poorly suited to operations in the field, with most aircraft suffering deformation of wings and tails (and particularly leading edges) due to exposure to weather, adversely affecting the aircraft's flying characteristics. It was planned to phase out the type following replacement by license-built B.71 bombers (the Czechoslovak designation for the Soviet Tupolev SB), but before this could happen, Germany occupied Bohemia and Moravia on 15 March 1939. The Germans seized 58 Ab.101s, while a single Ab.101 was in Slovakia when Slovakia seceded from Czechoslovakia on 14 March, and so came under the control of the Slovak Air Force. While at least one Ab-101 was painted in German markings, the Germans made little or no use of the captured Ab.101s. The sole Slovak Ab.101 defected to Poland on 4 June 1939, together with three Letov Š-328. It was captured by the Germans at Dęblin following the Invasion of Poland in September 1939.

== Variants ==
A.101
Two seat bomber-reconnaissance derivative of Aero A.100, powered by 588 kW (789 hp) ČKD-Praga Asso 800 engine. 30 built.
Ab-101
Revised bomber version powered by 632 kW (848 hp) Hispano-Suiza 12Ydrs engine. 65 built.
A.104
Monoplane derivative of Ab.104. No production.

== Operators ==
Czechoslovakia

- Czechoslovak Air Force

Slovakia

- Slovak Air Force (1939–1945)

Spanish Republic

- Spanish Republican Air Force

Spanish State

- Spanish Nationalist Air Force

== Specifications (A.101) ==
Data from Monografie: Aero A-101/Ab-101: Část III

General characteristics

- Crew: 2
- Length: 12.09 m (39 ft 8 in)
- Wingspan: 17.00 m (55 ft 9 in)
- Height: 3.86 m (12 ft 8 in)
- Wing area: 57.10 m^{2} (614.6 sq ft)
- Empty weight: 2,500 kg (5,512 lb)
- Max takeoff weight: 4,260 kg (9,392 lb)
- Powerplant: 1 × ČKD-Praga Asso 800 W-18 water-cooled piston engine, 588 kW (789 hp)

Performance

- Maximum speed: 265 km/h (165 mph, 143 kn) at 4,500 m (14,800 ft)
- Range: 845 km (525 mi, 456 nmi)
- Service ceiling: 5,600 m (18,400 ft)

Armament

- Guns:
  - 1× forward-firing 7.92 mm (0.312 in) vz.30 (Česká zbrojovka Strakonice) machine guns
  - 2× 7.92 mm vz.30 (Česká zbrojovka Strakonice) in ring mount for observer
- Bombs: 600 kg (1,300 lb)

== See also ==
Related development

- A.430
- A.100
- A.104

Related lists

- List of bomber aircraft
- List of interwar military aircraft
- List of aircraft of the Spanish Republican Air Force

== Bibliography ==
- Cerda, Juan Arraez (May 2003). "Les Aero A-101 en Espagne". Avions: Toute L'Aeronautique et Son Histoire... (in French). No. 122. pp. 47–56.
- Green, William (1967). War Planes of the Second World War: Volume Seven - Bombers and Reconnaissance Aircraft. London: Macdonald.
- Howson, Gerald (1999). Arms for Spain: The Untold Story of the Spanish Civil War. New York: St. Martin's Press. ISBN 0-312-24177-1.
- Kučera, Pavel; Vraný, Jiří (1988). "Monografie: Aero A-101/Ab-101: Část I". Letectví a Kosmonautika (in Czech). Vol. LXIV, no. 18. pp. 710–712. ISSN 0024-1156.
- Kučera, Pavel; Vraný, Jiří (1988). "Monografie: Aero A-101/Ab-101: Část II". Letectví a Kosmonautika (in Czech). Vol. LXIV, no. 19. pp. 750–752. ISSN 0024-1156.
- Kučera, Pavel; Vraný, Jiří (1988). "Monografie: Aero A-101/Ab-101: Část III". Letectví a Kosmonautika (in Czech). Vol. LXIV, no. 20. pp. 789–792. ISSN 0024-1156.
- Rajlich, Jiří; Majtenyi, David (2012). "Export a využití československé letecké výbroje v občanské válce ve Španělsku 1936–1939: Část I". Historie a Vojeství (in Czech). Vol. LXI, no. 1. pp. 4–33.
- Rajlich, Jiří; Majtenyi, David (2012). "Export and Use of Czechoslovak Aviation Equipment in Spanish Civil War 1936–1939 (part 1)". Historie a Vojeství. Vol. LXI, no. 1. pp. 34–35.
- Rajlich, Jiří; Majtenyi, David (2012). "Export a využití československé letecké výbroje v občanské válce ve Španělsku 1936–1939: Část II". Historie a Vojeství (in Czech). Vol. LXI, no. 2. pp. 4–27.
- Rajlich, Jiří; Majtenyi, David (2012). "Export and Use of Czechoslovak Aviation Equipment in Spanish Civil War 1936–1939 (conclusion)". Historie a Vojeství. Vol. LXI, no. 2. pp. 28–29.
