= A125 =

A125, A.125 or A-125 may refer to:

- A125 road (Great Britain), a road in England
- Aero A.125, a version of the 1920s Czechoslovak Aero A.25 military trainer aircraft
- Austin A125 Sheerline, a 1947 British luxury car
- HMAS Toowoomba (J157/B251/A125), a 1941 Royal Australian Navy Bathurst class corvette
