= Aero A.21 =

General information
- Type: Night trainer aircraft
- Manufacturer: Aero Vodochody
- Primary user: Czech Air Force

The Aero A.21 was a biplane military trainer aircraft developed in Czechoslovakia from the Aero A.11 reconnaissance-bomber. The aircraft was developed specifically as a night-trainer, to teach Czech Air Force pilots instrument flying techniques.

== Specifications (A.21) ==
Data from On "nocturne" tchéoslovaque: l'Aero A-21

General characteristics

- Crew: 2
- Length: 8.10 m (26 ft 7 in)
- Wingspan: 12.78 m (41 ft 11 in)
- Height: 3.16 m (10 ft 4 in)
- Wing area: 36.51 m^{2} (393.0 sq ft)
- Empty weight: 950 kg (2,094 lb)
- Gross weight: 1,240 kg (2,734 lb)
- Powerplant: 1 × Breitfeld & Danek Perun I 6-cyl. water-cooled in-line piston engine, 130 kW (180 hp)

Performance

- Maximum speed: 170 km/h (110 mph, 92 kn)
- Cruise speed: 150 km/h (93 mph, 81 kn)
- Range: 340 km (210 mi, 180 nmi)
- Service ceiling: 6,500 m (21,300 ft)
- Time to altitude: 21 min 3 s to 3,000 m (9,800 ft)
- Wing loading: 36 kg/m^{2} (7.4 lb/sq ft)

== Operators ==
- Czechoslovakia.

== See also ==
Related development

- Aero A.11
- Aero A.12
- Aero A.22
- Aero A.25
- Aero A.29

Related lists

- List of military trainer aircraft

== Bibliography ==
- Kudlicka, Bohumir (February 2002). "On "nocturne" tchéoslovaque: l'Aero A-21" [Czech Nightlife: The Aero A-21]. Avions: Toute l'Aéronautique et son histoire (in French) (107): 53–55. ISSN 1243-8650.
