= Aero A.38 =

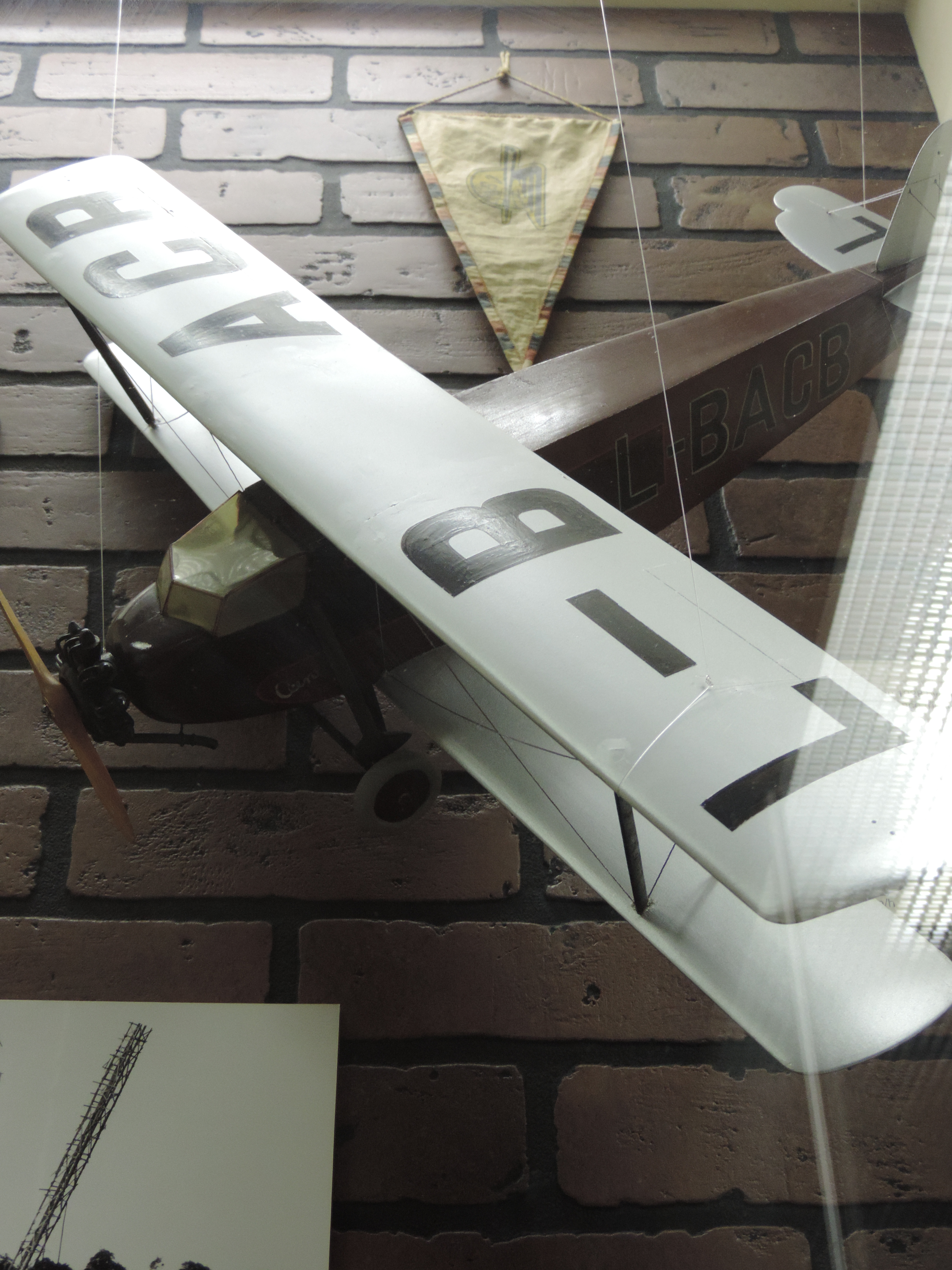

General information
- Type: Airliner
- Manufacturer: Aero Vodochody
- Primary users: Československé státní aerolinie CIDNA

History
- Developed from: Aero A.35

The Aero A.38 was a Czechoslovak biplane airliner of the 1920s and 1930s. Following the relatively modern A.35, this aircraft was something of a throwback, marrying a fuselage derived from the A.35 to wings copied from the A.23. A few served with ČSA, and others with French airline Compagnie Internationale de Navigation Aérienne. These latter aircraft were powered by a French Gnome-Rhône engine instead.

== Variants ==
- A.38-1 : Fitted with a Walter-built Bristol Jupiter radial piston engine. Three built.
- A.38-2 : Fitted with a Gnome-Rhône 9A2 Jupiter radial piston engine. Two built.

== Specifications (A.38) ==
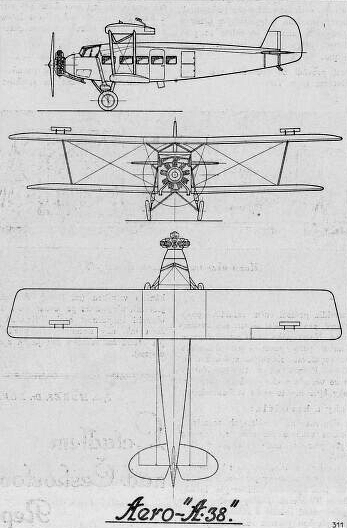
Three-view drawing

Data from http://typesofplanes.com/airplanes/Aero+A.38

General characteristics

- Crew: Two (pilot and mechanic)
- Capacity: 8 passengers
- Length: 12.8 m (42 ft 0 in)
- Wingspan: 16.6 m (54 ft 6 in)
- Height: 4.5 m (14 ft 9 in)
- Wing area: 67 m^{2} (720 sq ft)
- Empty weight: 1,740 kg (3,836 lb)
- Gross weight: 3,150 kg (6,945 lb)
- Powerplant: 1 × Walter-built Bristol Jupiter 9-cyl. air-cooled radial piston engine, 313 kW (420 hp)

Performance

- Maximum speed: 190 km/h (120 mph, 100 kn)
- Service ceiling: 4,800 m (15,700 ft)
- Rate of climb: 1.77 m/s (348 ft/min)
- Wing loading: 47 kg/m^{2} (9.6 lb/sq ft)
- Power/mass: 0.10 kW/kg (0.06 hp/lb)
