= Letov Š-6 =

Š-6
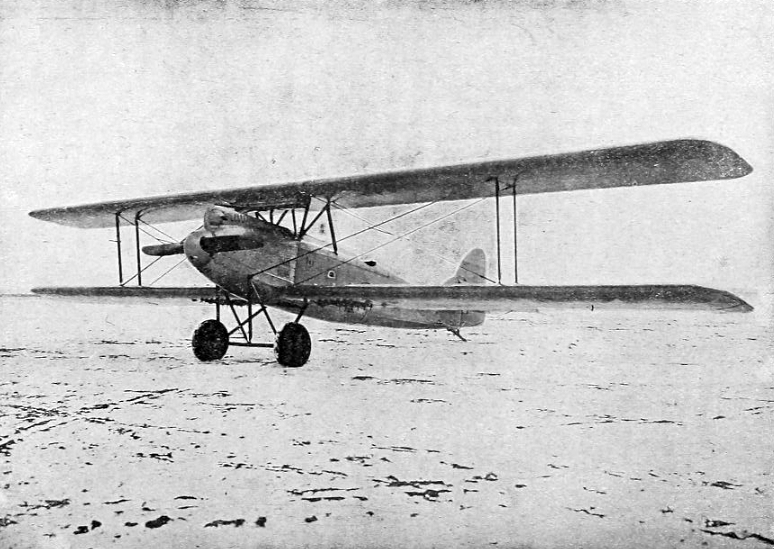
- Letov Š-6 (1923)

General information
- Type: Bomber
- National origin: Czechoslovakia
- Manufacturer: Letov
- Primary user: Czechoslovak Air Force
- Number built: 35

History
- First flight: 1923

The Letov Š-6 was a bomber aircraft produced in Czechoslovakia during the 1920s. Derived from the Š-2, it was a biplane of conventional design. The wing cellule was an all-new design with a thicker profile, and while it had been intended to build them with a metal structure, wood was used instead due to shortages. Performance during testing was so promising that in 1924 an Š-6 was used to set a new altitude record with a 500 kg payload, and (on another occasion) a national endurance record of 10 h 32 min.

The Š-6 enjoyed a long career in Czechoslovak service, remaining in use until 1934. One example was given a civil registration (L-BORA) and evaluated as an airliner for the Prague–Gothenburg route, but nothing came of this.

== Specifications ==
Data from Jane's all the World's Aircraft 1924, Flight: Goethenburg International Aero Exhibition Aero A.10

General characteristics

- Crew: 2
- Length: 8.85 m (29 ft 0 in)
- Wingspan: 15.75 m (51 ft 8 in)
- Height: 3.57 m (11 ft 9 in)
- Wing area: 43 m^{2} (460 sq ft)
- Airfoil: Jonkeroski (sic)
- Empty weight: 1,152 kg (2,540 lb)
- Gross weight: 1,848 kg (4,074 lb)
- Powerplant: 1 × Maybach Mb.IVa 6-cylinder water-cooled inline piston engine, 190 kW (260 hp)
- Propellers: 2-bladed fixed-pitch propeller

Performance

- Maximum speed: 180 km/h (110 mph, 97 kn)
- Range: 1,200 km (750 mi, 650 nmi)
- Service ceiling: 6,250 m (20,510 ft)
- Rate of climb: 2.6 m/s (510 ft/min)
- Time to altitude: 2,000 m (6,600 ft) in 14 minutes

== See also ==
Related development

- Letov Š-19

Aircraft of comparable role, configuration, and era

- Aero A.11
- Aero A.12
- Macchi M.15

Related lists

- List of Interwar military aircraft
