= Letov Š-19 =

Š-19
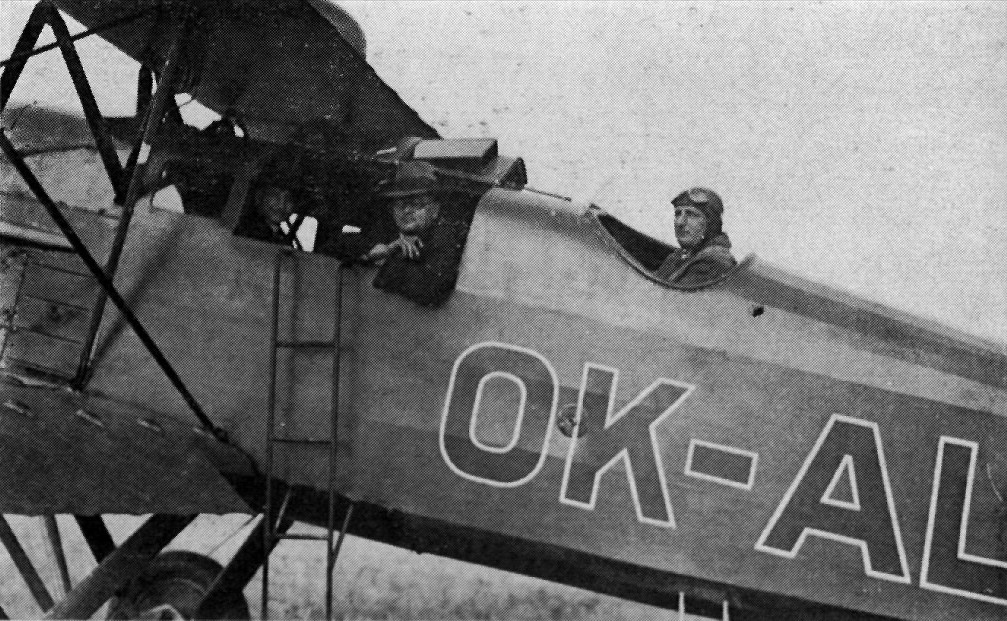

General information
- Type: Airliner
- National origin: Czechoslovakia
- Manufacturer: Letov
- Primary user: ČSA
- Number built: 7 + 2 prototype

History
- First flight: 1924
- Developed from: Letov Š-6

The Letov Š-19 was an airliner produced in small numbers in Czechoslovakia during the 1920s.

== Design and development ==
Following tests with an Š-6 bomber over domestic passenger routes, ČSA requested that a passenger-carrying version be developed. While retaining the basic layout of the Š-6, the Š-19 added a fully enclosed passenger cabin within the fuselage, with seating for four. The pilot had an open cockpit behind the cabin.

Three machines were built with the same Maybach engine that had powered the bomber version, but these were found to have poor flying characteristics, and for the other four examples produced, a Walter powerplant was used instead, along with making some refinements to the ailerons and wing bracing.

Put into service on the Prague-Košice route, the type was not a success. The passenger cabin was very noisy, since it was placed immediately behind the engine. Furthermore, this placement made boarding and disembarking awkward, and visibility for the passengers was poor. Besides this, the Š-19 could not match the performance offered by foreign aircraft, and no further production was undertaken.

== Specifications ==
General characteristics

- Crew: one pilot
- Capacity: four passengers
- Length: 8.85 m (29 ft 0 in)
- Wingspan: 14.10 m (45 ft 11 in)
- Wing area: 45.0 m^{2} (484 sq ft)
- Empty weight: 1,404 kg (3,088 lb)
- Gross weight: 2,004 kg (4,408 lb)
- Powerplant: 1 × Walter W-IV , 190 kW (260 hp)

Performance

- Maximum speed: 178 km/h (111 mph, 96 kn)
- Range: 770 km (480 mi, 420 nmi)
- Service ceiling: 4,900 m (16,100 ft)
- Rate of climb: 2.4 m/s (470 ft/min)

== See also ==
Aircraft of comparable role, configuration, and era

- de Havilland Fox Moth
