= Aero A.104 =

A.104

General information
- Type: Light bomber Reconnaissance aircraft
- Manufacturer: Aero Vodochody
- Status: Did not enter production
- Number built: 2

History
- First flight: 1937

The Aero A.104 was a parasol monoplane light bomber and reconnaissance aircraft built in Czechoslovakia during the 1930s. It was the final derivative of the Aero A.100, and was essentially an Aero Ab.101 with an enclosed cockpit and without the lower wing. Although two different prototypes flew in 1937, it was not mass-produced.

== Specifications (A.104) ==
General characteristics

- Length: 10.8 m (35 ft 5 in)
- Wingspan: 15.5 m (50 ft 10 in)
- Wing area: 35.4 m^{2} (381 sq ft)
- Gross weight: 3,100 kg (6,834 lb)
- Powerplant: 1 × ČKD-built Hispano-Suiza 12Ydrs V-12 Liquid-cooled piston engine, 642 kW (861 hp)

Performance

- Maximum speed: 330 km/h (210 mph, 180 kn)
- Range: 1,000 km (620 mi, 540 nmi)
- Service ceiling: 9,000 m (30,000 ft)
- Rate of climb: 6.8 m/s (1,340 ft/min)
- Wing loading: 88 kg/m^{2} (18 lb/sq ft)
- Power/mass: 0.21 kW/kg

Armament

- Bombs: 200 kg (440 lb)

== See also ==
Related development

- A.100
- A.101

Related lists

- List of bomber aircraft
