= Aero A.30 =

Czechoslovak light reconnaissance bomber

A.30
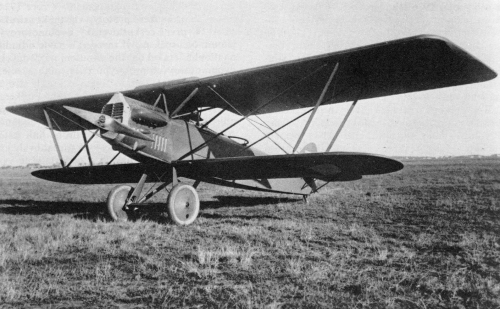

General information
- Type: Light reconnaissance bomber
- National origin: Czechoslovakia
- Manufacturer: Aero
- Number built: 79 (+116 A.32)

History
- Developed from: Aero A.11
- Variants: Aero A.100; Aero A.32
- Developed into: Aero A.100

The Aero A.30 was a biplane light bomber and reconnaissance aircraft. It was built in Czechoslovakia in the late 1920s. It originated as an attempt by Aero to improve the performance of the Aero A.11, but soon evolved into quite a different aircraft, larger and more powerful than its predecessor. The aircraft is readily distinguished from other related types, through the difference in spans between its wings – the upper set being of much greater span than the lower.

== Development ==
In 1926, the Ministry of National Defense (MNO) issued a request for a long-range reconnaissance and medium bomber aircraft. Aero entered the competition with the A.30, based on the Aero A.11, designed by Antonín Husník. The A.11 airframe was enlarged and strengthened, and fitted with a Lorraine 12E Courlis engine. Prototype test flights continued until the spring of 1927. This led to redesigns, including the tail surface, wing reinforcement system and landing gear, so that prototypes weren't considered complete until the summer of 1927.

Prototypes of the A.30 were retrospectively designated A.130, with the A.230 being the main production version. The A.330 and A.430 featured different, more powerful engines, but the latter of these did not enter production, serving instead as the prototype for the Aero A.100.

The public unveiling, organized by the Aeroclub of the Czechoslovak Republic, took place at the 4th International Air Show in Prague on 4–19 July 1927. On 10 August 1927, Josef Novák, the chief pilot at Aero, set several records in the A.30. This included nine national endurance records as well as speed records. Several of those were broken by Alois Ježek on 12 October 1927 in a Letov Š-16. Antonín Duchek set a national record flying an A.30 equipped with a Skoda L 500 hp (367 kW) engine on 23 July 1929.

== Variants ==
A-30
Early model. Three prototypes with Lorraine Dietrich 12Cc engines (450 hp) were completed in the manufacturing plant in 1926 and 1927. About five production models with Skoda L engines (500 hp) were built in 1928 and 1929.
Ab-30
with split landing gear and characteristic drop-shaped covers of rubber shock absorbers. Škoda L engine with an output of 367 kW (500 hp). 12 Ab 30s produced in 1931 and 1932.
A-130
Walter Jupiter ( Bristol Jupiter ) radial engine prototype. 1 unit was produced.
A-230
serial type with licensed Praga three-row engine (Lorraine-Dietrich 12Ccs). The type called "Lochneska" produced in series in 1930–1931 was a modification of the A-30 type and an improvement of the A-130. 25 A-230s produced.
A-330
due to constant problems with the Škoda L engines, the A-30 and Ab-30 types (18 units) were rebuilt and the 478/551 kW (650/750 hp) Praga ESV engine was used. These machines were armed with machine guns vz. 28 and vz. 30
A-30HS
one converted A-30 with 441 kW (600 hp) Hispano Suiza 12Ybrs engine
A-430
redesigned Avia Vr-36 powered aircraft project completed as Aero A-100

== Operators ==
Czechoslovakia

- Czechoslovak Air Force

Iran

- Imperial Iranian Air Force purchased one Aero A.30 from Czechoslovakia in 1923

== Specifications (A.230) ==
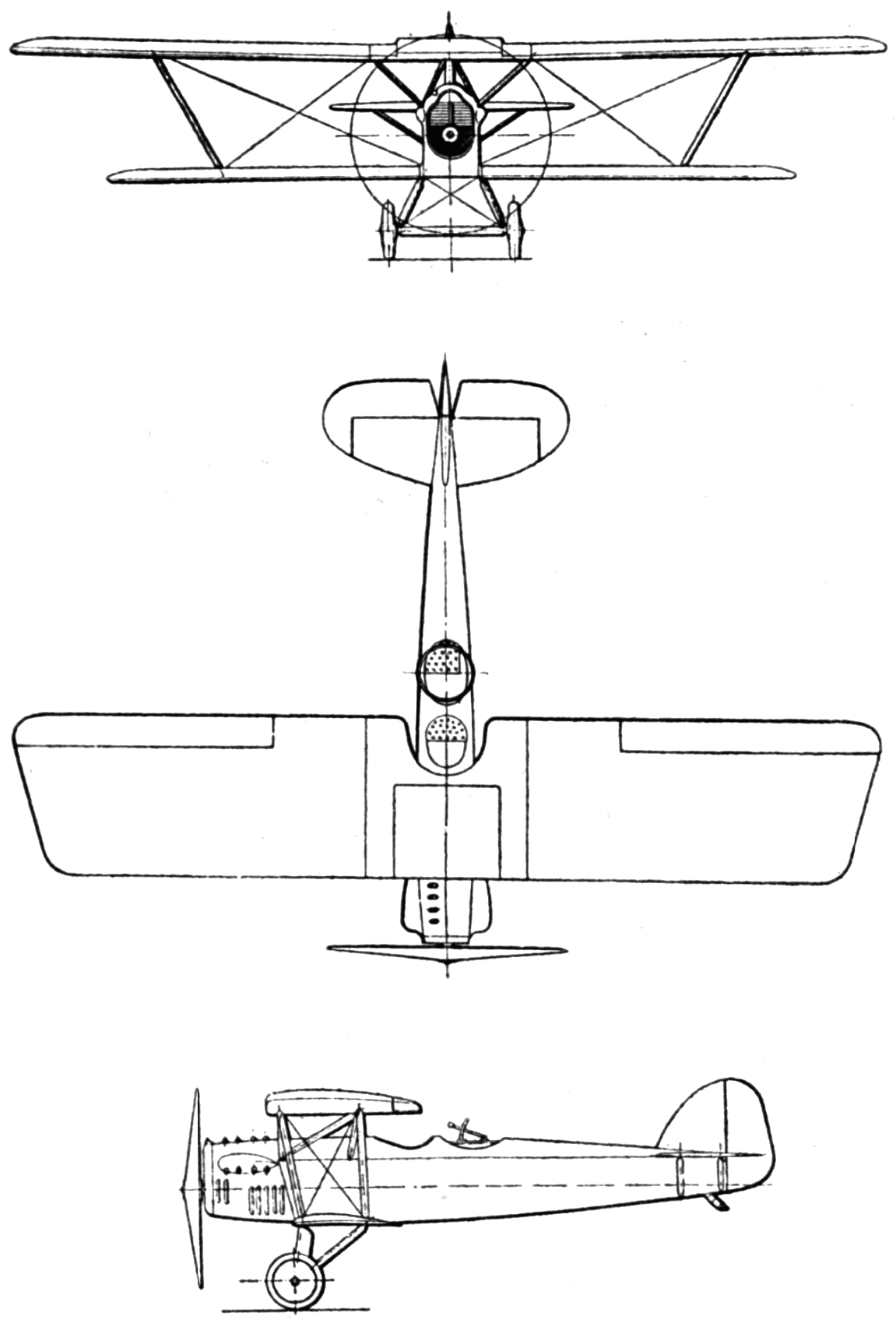
Aero A.230 3-view drawing from L'Aéronautique January,1927

Data from Jane's all the World's Aircraft 1928

General characteristics

- Crew: 2 (pilot & observer)
- Length: 10 m (32 ft 10 in)
- Wingspan: 15.3 m (50 ft 2 in)
- Wing area: 46.2 m^{2} (497 sq ft)
- Empty weight: 1,420 kg (3,131 lb)
- Gross weight: 2,375 kg (5,236 lb)
- Powerplant: 1 × Lorraine 12E Courlis W-12 water-cooled piston engine, 340 kW (450 hp)

Performance

- Maximum speed: 198 km/h (123 mph, 107 kn)
- Service ceiling: 5,800 m (19,000 ft)
- Rate of climb: 3 m/s (590 ft/min)
- Wing loading: 50 kg/m^{2} (10.2 lb/sq ft)
- Power/mass: 0.146 kW/kg (0.089 hp/lb)

Armament

- Guns:
- 1 × forward firing 7.7 mm (0.30 in) Vickers machine gun
- 2 × 7.7 mm (0.30 in) Lewis machine gun in flexible mount for observer
- Bombs: Up to 500 kg (1,100 lb) of bombs

== See also ==
Related development

- Aero A.11
- Aero A.100

Related lists

- List of military aircraft of Germany
- List of World War II military aircraft of Germany
