= Aero A.23 =

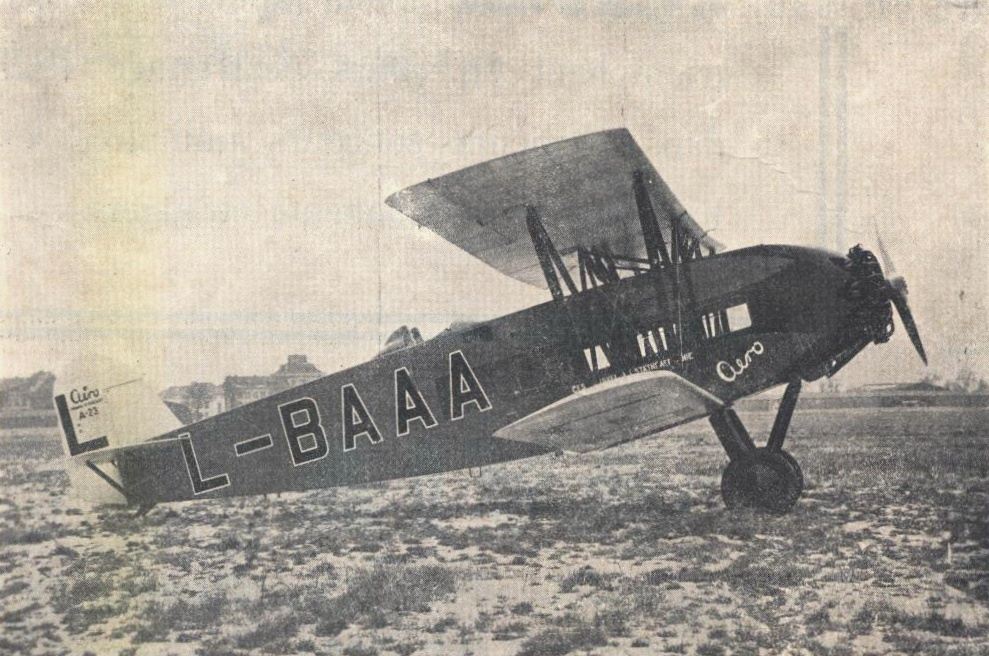

General information
- Type: Airliner
- Manufacturer: Aero Vodochody
- Primary user: Czech Airlines
- Number built: 7

History
- Manufactured: 1920s
- Introduction date: 1928
- First flight: 1926
- Retired: Late 1930s

The Aero A.23 was a Czechoslovak airliner of the 1920s. Aero Vodochody had produced the first Czech airliner, the A.10, four of which had served with ČSA, the national airline. The A.23, another biplane, was bigger, more powerful, and could carry more passengers.

== Design and development ==
The Avia A.23 was a single bay biplane with its wings mounted without stagger. Both wings were almost rectangular, though the tips were slightly angled; both carried light dihedral. The upper wing was a little larger in both span and chord and was in three parts, with a short centre-section held over the fuselage on a low cabane. The lower wing was in two parts and mounted on the lower fuselage, braced to the upper wing with a pair of outward-leaning, parallel interplane struts made of profiled steel tubes. Only the upper wings carried ailerons. The wings were two-spar wooden structures and were fabric covered.

Its single engine was an uncowled, 310 kW (420 hp) Walter-built Jupiter IV on a steel tube mounting and with a pair of long, airfoil-section fuel tanks placed on the upper wing near the ends of the centre-section. Behind its firewall, the fuselage, built from steel tubes, was rectangular in section and housed a passenger cabin 3 m (9 ft 10 in) long fitted with six permanent and two folding seats. Each passenger in the fixed places had a window in the plywood walls. There was engine access via a hatch in the front of the cabin and a toilet at the back. Doors over the wings gave access to the cabin. The A.23 was flown from an open, side-by-side cockpit in the upper fuselage aft of the cabin, with the captain on the left and the second pilot/radio operator on his right. A door below the right-hand seat gave access to the engine hatch via the cabin. The cockpit was normally accessed through a low, tetragonal, port-side door. Behind them was a baggage hold.

The A.23's straight-edged tailplane, mounted on the upper fuselage and strut-braced from below, was adjustable in flight and carried separate rounded, balanced elevators. Its fin was small, with a large, rounded, balanced rudder which extended down to the keel and worked in a gap between the elevators. All components were steel-framed and fabric-covered.

Its fixed, conventional undercarriage originally had mainwheels on a single axle, mounted on V-struts from the lower fuselage with wire cross-bracing. The rear components of the V-struts had rubber disc shock absorbers. By May 1928 the axle had gone and the landing gear was made more robust with a transverse X-strut. A castoring steel tailskid had its rubber shock absorber.

== Operational history ==
The first A.23 flew in 1926. From 1928, seven A.23s flew ČSA's Prague-Marienbad (Mariánské Lázně) and Prague-Uzhhorod; some remained in service until 1936.

== Operators ==
Czechoslovakia

- ČSA

== Specifications ==
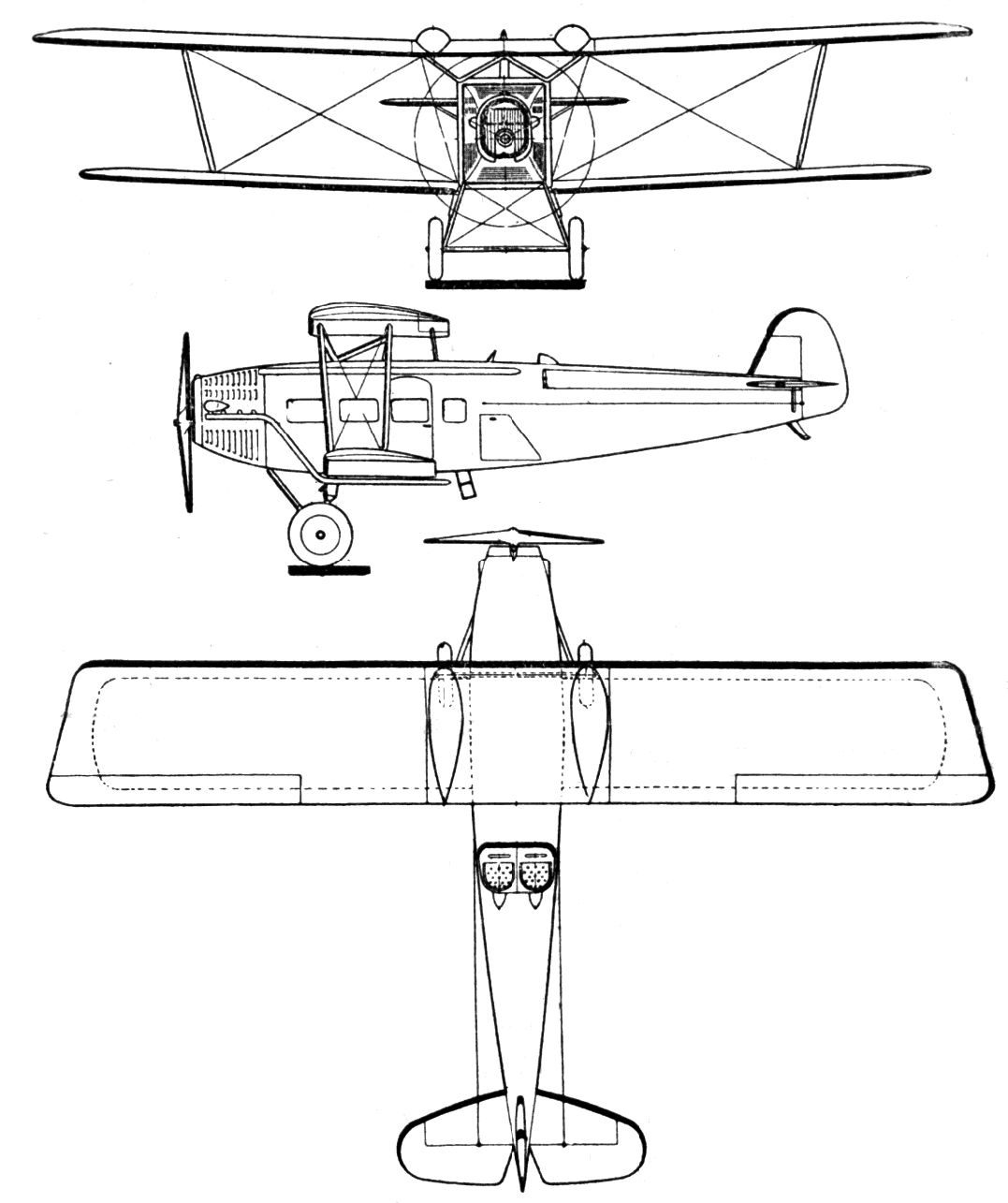
Aero A.23 as designed with a Lorraine-Dietrich 12C motor. 3-view drawing from Les Ailes May 17, 1928

Data from Les Ailes May 1928, Jane's Encyclopedia of Aircraft

General characteristics

- Crew: Two
- Capacity: Six or seven passengers
- Length: 12.20 m (40 ft 0 in)
- Wingspan: 16.60 m (54 ft 6 in)
- Height: 4.50 m (14 ft 9 in)
- Wing area: 67 m^{2} (720 sq ft)
- Empty weight: 1,790 kg (3,946 lb)
- Gross weight: 3,100 kg (6,834 lb)
- Powerplant: 1 × Walter Jupiter IV 9-cylinder radial, 310 kW (420 hp)
- Propellers: 2-bladed

Performance

- Maximum speed: 185 km/h (115 mph, 100 kn)
- Cruise speed: 155 km/h (96 mph, 84 kn)
- Stall speed: 90 km/h (56 mph, 49 kn) minimum speed
- Range: 620 km (390 mi, 330 nmi) no reserves
- Service ceiling: 5,500 m (18,000 ft)
- Time to altitude: 39 min 15 s to 5,000 m (16,000 ft)
- Take-off distance: 80 m (260 ft)
- Landing distance: 60 m (200 ft)

== See also ==
Related lists

- List of civil aircraft
