= Aero HC-2 Heli Baby =

Light utility helicopter

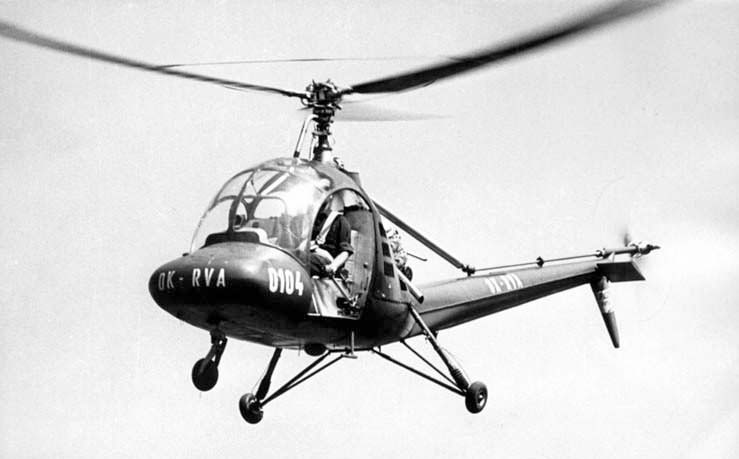
- HC-2 in flight

General information
- Type: Light helicopter
- National origin: Czechoslovakia
- Manufacturer: Aero Vodochody
- Designer: Jaroslav Šlechta
- Number built: 23 (including 2 prototypes)

History
- Manufactured: 1958-1962
- Introduction date: 1955
- First flight: December 3, 1954

The Aero HC-2 Heli Baby is a two-seat general-purpose light utility helicopter, designed by engineer Jaroslav Šlechta, and produced by the Czechoslovak company Aero Vodochody in the 1950s. It has a three-blade main rotor, and a two-blade tail rotor. The helicopter has an entirely metal frame and cockpit, and windows made of Plexiglas. It was the first and the only Czechoslovak-designed helicopter to be produced.

== Design and development ==
The HC-2 was designed by a team working at Aero Vodochody led by engineer Jaroslav Šlechta, building on experience gained in the design of Šlechta's earlier Praga XE-II prototype. Construction of the prototype began in 1951, and testing commenced in 1954. The first flight occurred on December 3, 1954, and the helicopter was introduced to the public in 1955 at the Brno Industries Fair. Production was slated to begin in 1957, however, engine problems delayed it.

An initial order of 200 of these helicopters was announced. The Czechoslovak Air Force was a user of the HC-2, as was the Czechoslovak People's Army. The Heli Baby was capable of carrying a pilot and 100 kg (220 lb) of cargo over a distance of 100 km (62 mi), while using 22.0 L (4.85 imp gal) gallons of fuel. In 1959, it was one of the world's lightest two-seated helicopters. Initially powered by an 83 hp (62 kW) Praga DH engine, the more powerful 105 hp (78 kW) Avia M 110H engine, designed specifically for use in helicopters, replaced it after approximately six years. The Heli Baby can be used for transport, training, and various "other duties in military and civil service". Cargo space is situated behind the helicopter's two seats. The non-retractable undercarriage has three wheels in a tricycle configuration.

== Variants ==
HC-2
Prototypes and initial production, powered by 62 kW (83 hp) Praga DH engine.
HC-102
Revised version, powered by 85 kW (114 hp) Avia M 110H engine.
HC-202
Proposed version powered by uprated (103 kW (138 hp) M 110H engine. Unbuilt.

== Operators ==
Czechoslovakia

- Czechoslovak People's Army
- Svazarm

== Specifications (HC-102) ==
Data from Se Značkou Zlin: Zlin HC-2/HC-102 Heli Baby

General characteristics

- Crew: 1
- Capacity: 1 passenger
- Length: 10.50 m (34 ft 5 in)
- Height: 2.57 m (8 ft 5 in)
- Empty weight: 450 kg (992 lb)
- Max takeoff weight: 680 kg (1,499 lb)
- Powerplant: 1 × Avia M 110H 4-cylinder air-cooled piston engine, 85 kW (114 hp)
- Main rotor diameter: 8.80 m (28 ft 10 in)
- Main rotor area: 60.83 m^{2} (654.8 sq ft)

Performance

- Maximum speed: 120 km/h (75 mph, 65 kn)
- Cruise speed: 100 km/h (62 mph, 54 kn)
- Range: 175 km (109 mi, 94 nmi)
- Service ceiling: 3,750 m (12,300 ft)
- Rate of climb: 3.40 m/s (669 ft/min)
- Hover ceiling: 420 m (1,380 ft)
