= Macchi M.15 =

Italian reconnaissance aircraft

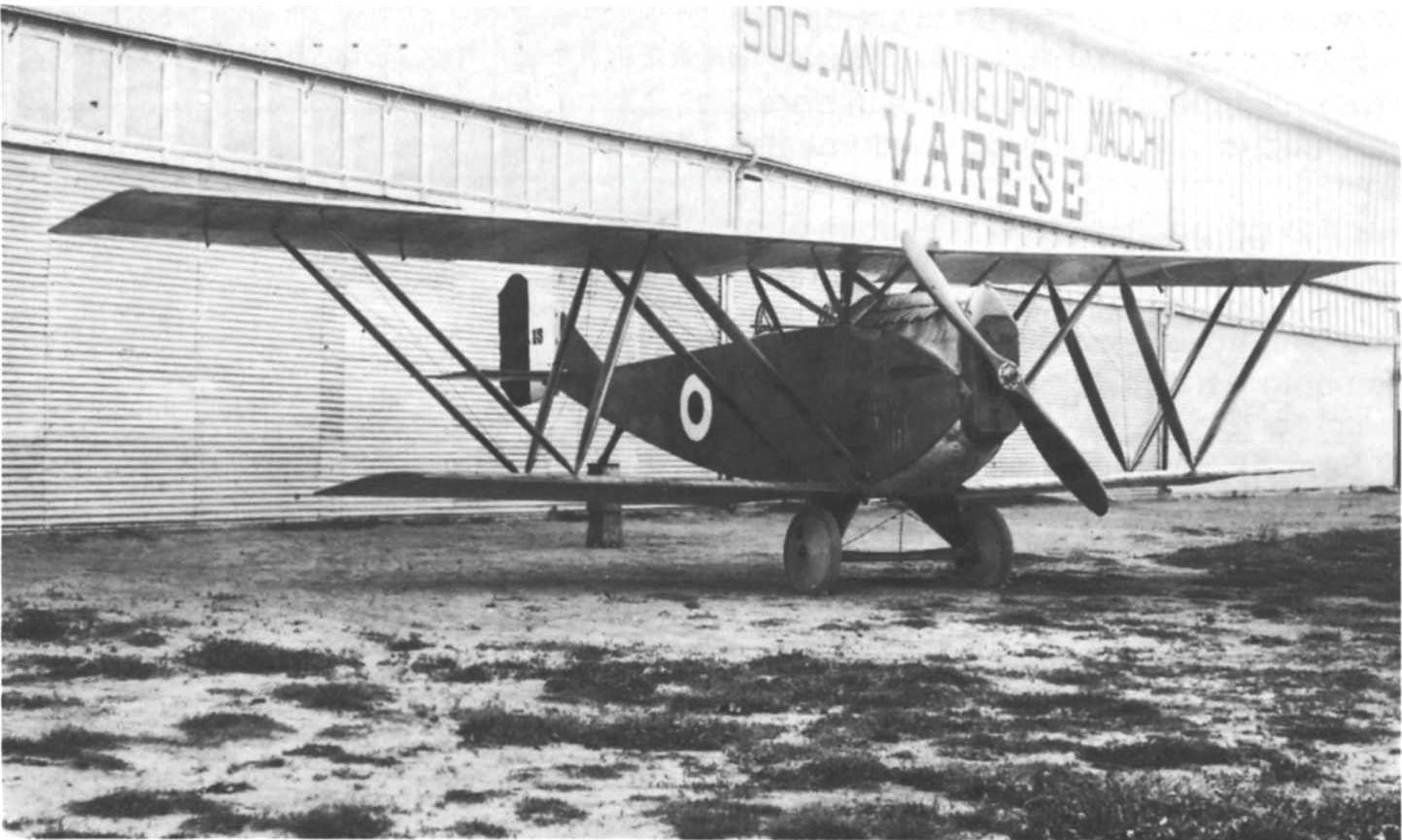

General information
- Type: Reconnaissance aircraft and trainer
- National origin: Italy
- Manufacturer: Macchi
- Designer: Ing Alessandro Tonini and Ing Piero Bergonzi
- Primary user: Italy
- Number built: 20

History
- Manufactured: 1918-1922
- First flight: 1918

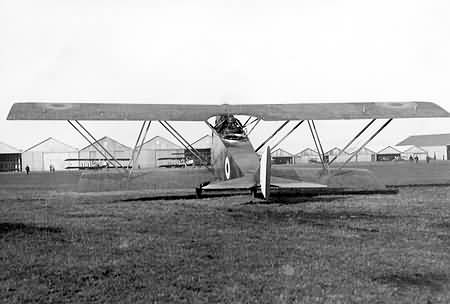

The Macchi M.15 was an Italian reconnaissance aircraft, bomber and trainer, designed by Alessandro Tonini and Piero Bergonzi and built by Macchi.

== Design and development ==
The M.15, which first flew in 1918, was a two-seat biplane with wings of unequal span, its upper wing being of wider span than its lower wing. Its interplane struts were inclined in a "V" configuration. Its 238-kilowatt (320-horsepower) Fiat A.12 engine drove a two-bladed propeller in a tractor configuration and gave it a top speed of 185 kilometers per hour (115 miles per hour). It had fixed landing gear. The Macchi M.15 Bis per trasporto passeggeri was a three-seat passenger transport with similar attributes to the M.15 that appeared from 1922, in the same year also a new reconnaissance version was released, simply called M.15 Bis. No more than 20 examples of all the models were built.

== Operational History ==
By December 1919, three aircraft were in service with the Regio Esercito.

In 1922, the M.15 were assigned to the 115th Squadron of the Corpo Aeronautico Militare (Royal Army's Air Corps) based in Bologna, part of the 15th Group stationed in Padua. In 1922 the order for 12 aircraft was placed. On 22 September 1923, one M.15 from the squadron was lost in an accident, resulting in the death of a crew member.

In 1923, the Bis version was registered for testing by the Direzione Superiore del Genio e delle Costruzioni Aeronautiche (Directorate of Engineering and Aeronautical Construction). After the establishment of the Regia Aeronautica, on 1 January 1924 18 aircraft were registered for assignment to the 30th and 115th Squadrons, which had not yet been established. In May 1924 an M.15 Bis was used by Prospero Freri for experimental launches with the parachute of his invention at Montecelio. In a subsequent summary of the planes in service dated 1 January 1925 no M.15 appears to have been used in reconnaissance units. Despite this, three examples of M.15 Bis were still in service for experiments in 1928.

== Variants ==
- M.15: First reconnaissance version designed in 1918, characterised by a very inclined fin and an ovoid-shaped radiator.
- M.15 Bis per trasporto passeggeri: Civilian version designed in 1919, equipped with a closed cabin for two passengers.
- M.15 Bis: Second reconnaissance version appeared in 1922, it was distinguished from the original M.15 by the curved profile of the fin and the different engine cowling, with a square-shaped radiator.

== Operators ==
Kingdom of Italy

- Corpo Aeronautico Militare
- Regia Aeronautica

== Specifications (M.15) ==
Data from

General characteristics

- Crew: two
- Length: 8.57 m (28 ft 1.4 in)
- Wingspan: 13.47 m (44 ft 2.3 in)
- Height: 3.37 m (11 ft 0.67 in)
- Wing area: 42.00 m^{2} (452.07 sq ft)
- Empty weight: 1,230 kg (2,712 lb)
- Gross weight: 1,743 kg (3,843 lb)
- Powerplant: 1 × Fiat A.12 , 238 kW (320 hp)

Performance

- Maximum speed: 185 km/h (115 mph, 100 kn)
- Range: 600 km (373 mi, 324 nmi)
- Service ceiling: 6,000 m (20,000 ft)

Armament

- 1 x 0.303 in Vickers cal. 7,7 fixed forward-firing synchronized machine gun
- 2 x 6.5 mm Fiat Mod.14 Avio machine guns: 1 in the dorsal position, 1 in the ventral position.

== See also ==
Aircraft of comparable role, configuration, and era

- Aero A.11
- Ansaldo SVA.10
- Fiat R.2
- Letov Š-6

Related lists

- List of Interwar military aircraft

== Notes ==
=== Bibliography ===
- Aeroplani Nieuport-Macchi (1918). Disegno N.15000 - M.15 Biplano da ricognizione. Varese.
- Aeroplani Nieuport-Macchi (1919). Disegno N.15002bis - M.15bis Biplano per trasporto passeggeri. Varese.
- Aeroplani Nieuport-Macchi (1922). Disegno N.15001A- M.15bis Biplano da ricognizione. Varese.
- Apostolo, Giorgio (2013). Ali tricolori, Parte 1: 1910-1922. Storia Militare.
- Ferrari, Massimo (2005). Le ali del ventennio: l'aviazione italiana dal 1923 al 1945. Franco Angeli.
- Gentilli, Roberto (2022). 1923-1926, L'aviazione italiana prima di Balbo. IBN Editore.
- Curami, Andrea (1981a). "Appunti sull'aviazione italiana negli anni '20 - Gli aerei da ricognizione 1ª parte". Aerofan Magazine (1).
- Curami, Andrea (1981b). "Appunti sull'aviazione italiana negli anni '20 - Gli aerei da ricognizione 2ª parte". Aerofan Magazine (2).
