= Aero A.11 =

Light bomber and reconnaissance aircraft family by Aero Vodochody

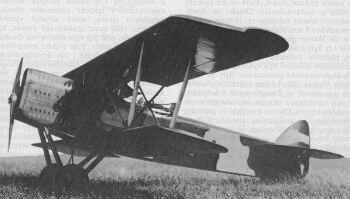

General information
- Type: Light bomber Reconnaissance aircraft
- Manufacturer: Aero Vodochody
- Designer: Antonín Husník
- Primary users: Czech Air Force Finnish Air Force
- Number built: 108

History
- Manufactured: 1924–1928
- Introduction date: 1920s
- First flight: 1924
- Retired: 1940s
- Variants: Aero A.12; Aero A.21; Aero A.25; Aero A.29

The Aero A.11 was a biplane light bomber and reconnaissance aircraft built in Czechoslovakia between the First and Second World Wars. It formed the basis for many other Czechoslovak military aircraft of the inter-war period. Around 250 were built, with some remaining in service at the outbreak of World War II.

Designed by Antonin Husnik, it was a development of the Aero A.12 (despite what the numbering of the designs might suggest). A Hispano-Suiza 8Fb-powered version, the A.11H-s was built for the Finnish Air Force, the only foreign operator of the type. The Finns had eight aircraft of this type and used them between 1927 and 1939.

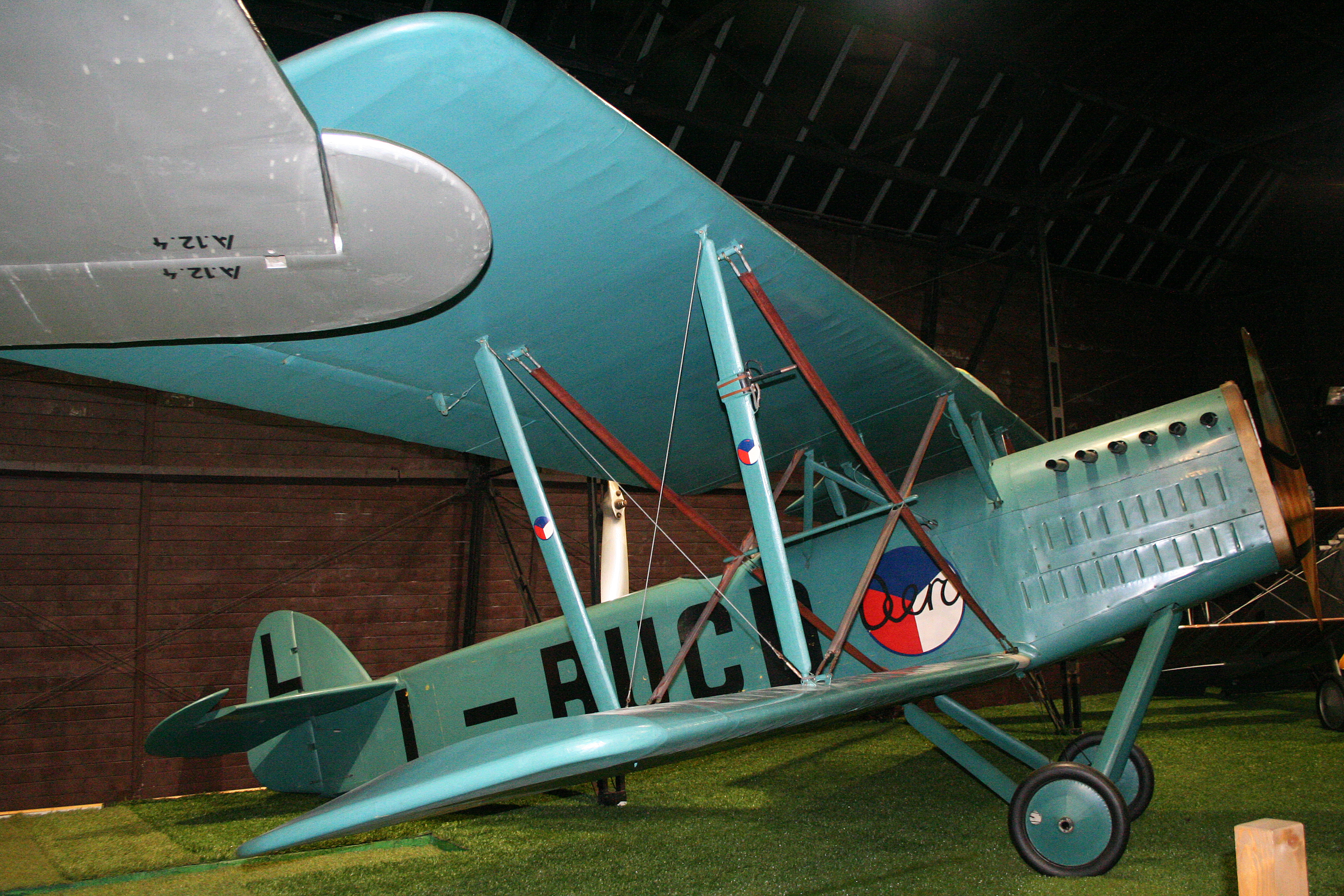
Replica Ab.11 in Prague Aviation Museum, Kbely

The Aero A.11 was the basis of the later Aero A.25 Aero A.29, Aero A.30, and Aero A.32 aircraft.

Aircraft A-11.105 was modified in 1928 with a 240 hp (176 kw) Walter Castor I engine installed, and first flown in March 1930. After undergoing military trials, 25 planes were produced as the Aero A.211 from 1930-1933. The A.211 featured advanced instrumentation in comparison to the A.11, was lengthened to 8.6m, and the weight was reduced to 880 kg. These planes carried no weapons and stayed in service until around 1939.

After the Dissolution of Czechoslovakia, the Slovak Air Force retained 3 Aš.11, 3 AP.32, 1 A.25, and 3 A.211s. The aircraft that remained in the Czech Republic were captured by Germany and A.211s were used by the Luftwaffe for training, with 4 units still on the books as of May 1940.

== Variants ==
- A.11 : Two-seat light bomber, reconnaissance biplane.
- A.11HS : Export version for Finland.
- A.11N : Night bomber version.
- Ab.11 : Light bomber version.

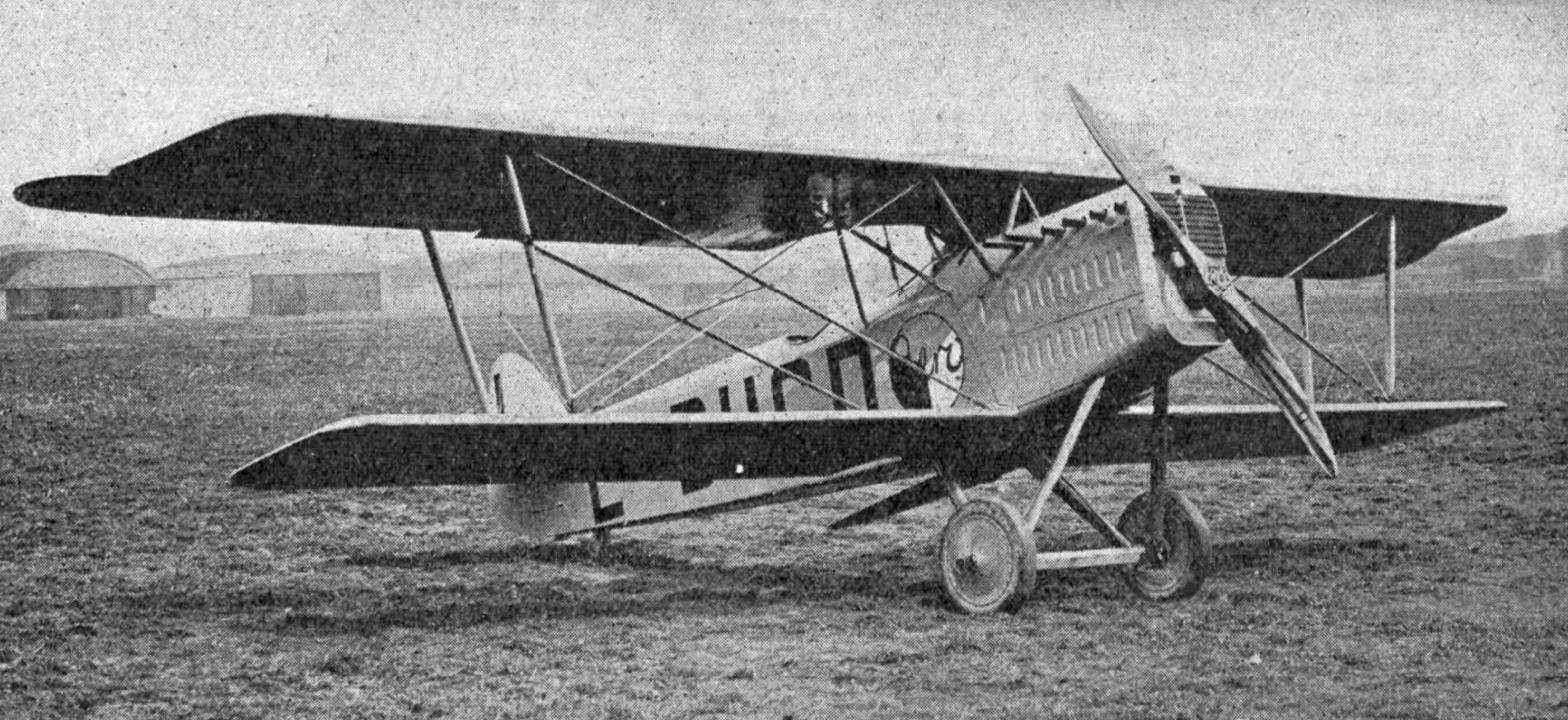
Aero Ab.11 L-BUCD

== Operators ==
Czechoslovakia

- Czechoslovak Air Force

Finland

- Finnish Air Force

== Specifications (Ab.11) ==
Data from Tschechoslowakische Flugzeuge : von 1918 bis heute

General characteristics

- Crew: 2
- Length: 8.2 m (26 ft 11 in)
- Wingspan: 12.8 m (42 ft 0 in)
- Height: 3.1 m (10 ft 2 in) (A.11}
- Wing area: 36.5 m^{2} (393 sq ft)
- Empty weight: 1,080 kg (2,381 lb)
- Gross weight: 1,588 kg (3,501 lb)

1,537 kg (3,389 lb) (A.11}

- Powerplant: 1 × Breitfield-Danek Perun II 6-cylinder water-cooled in-line piston engine, 180 kW (240 hp)

176 kW (236 hp) Walter W.IV (A.11}

- Propellers: 2-bladed fixed-pitch propeller

Performance

- Maximum speed: 216 km/h (134 mph, 117 kn)

240 km/h (150 mph; 130 kn) (A.11}

- Cruise speed: 190 km/h (120 mph, 100 kn)
- Range: 750 km (470 mi, 400 nmi)
- Service ceiling: 7,000 m (23,000 ft)

7,600 m (24,900 ft) (A.11}

- Rate of climb: 3.82 m/s (752 ft/min) (A.11}
- Time to altitude: 5,000 m (16,000 ft) in 19 minutes 30 seconds
- Wing loading: 43.7 kg/m^{2} (9.0 lb/sq ft)

42 kg/m^{2} (8.6 lb/sq ft) (A.11}

- Power/mass: 0.120 kW/kg (0.073 hp/lb) (A.11}

Armament

- Guns: ** 1× forward firing .303 in (7.7 mm) Vickers machine gun (A.11}
  - 2× .303 in (7.7 mm) Lewis machine gun in flexible mount for observer (A.11}
- Bombs: 200 kg (441 lb) (A.11}}

== See also ==
Related development

- Aero A.21
- Aero A.22
- Aero A.25
- Aero A.29
- Aero A.125

Aircraft of comparable role, configuration, and era

- Letov Š-6
- Macchi M.15

Related lists

- List of interwar military aircraft
