= Aero A.10 =

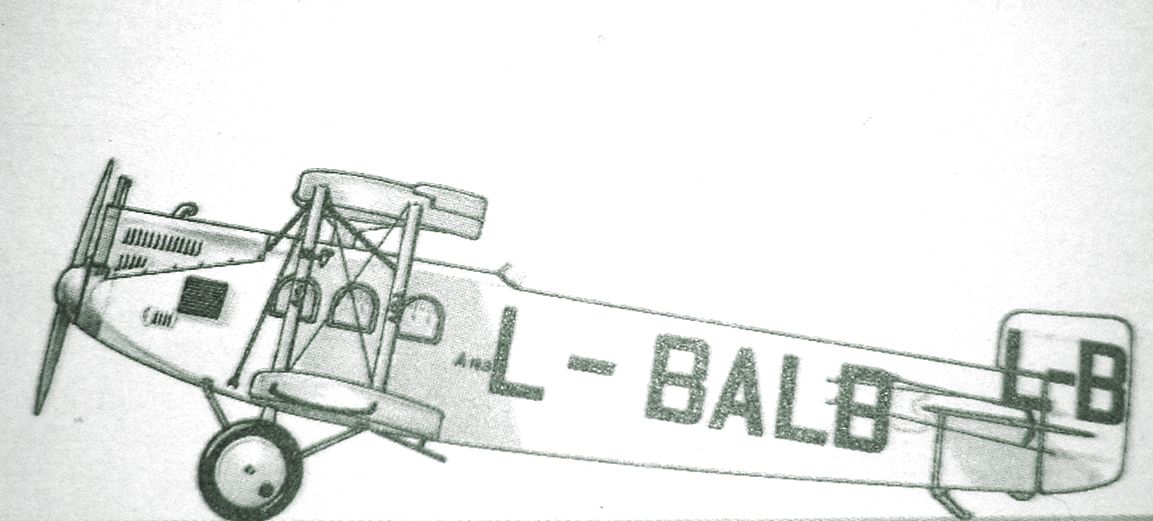

General information
- Type: Airliner
- Manufacturer: Aero Letňany
- Primary user: Czech Airlines
- Number built: 5

History
- First flight: 3 January 1922
- Retired: 1928

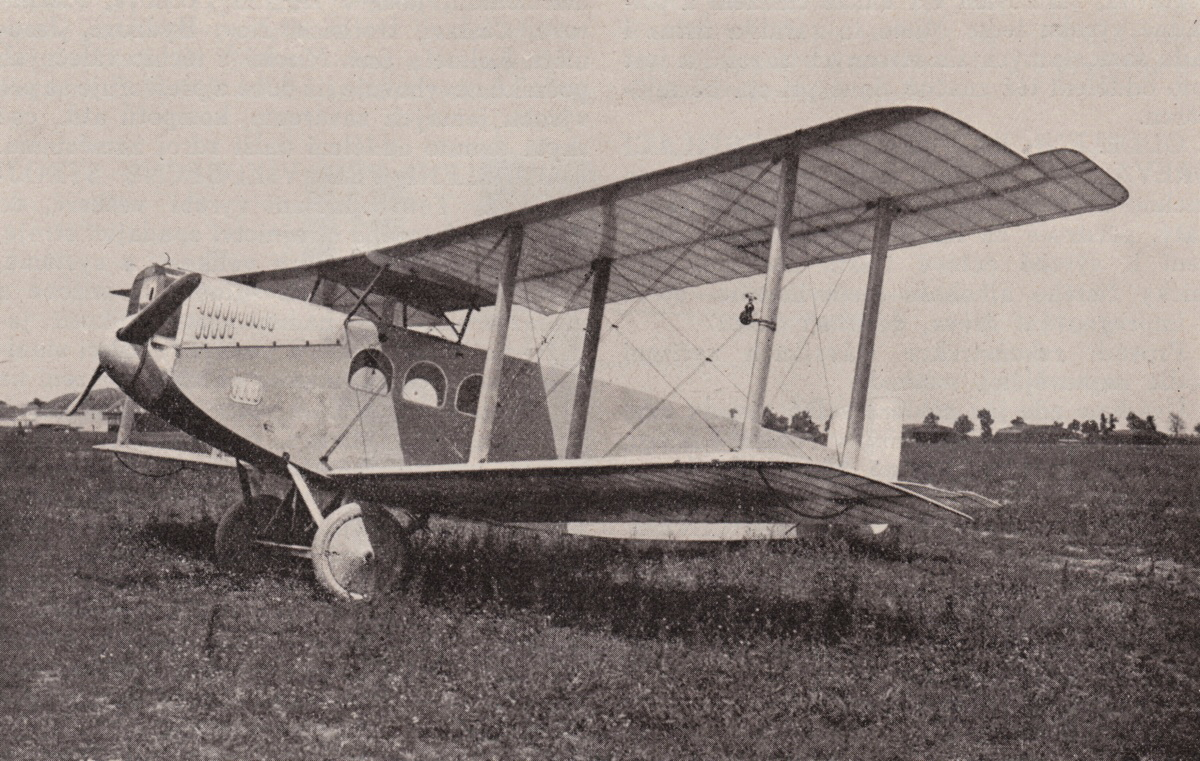
Aero A-10

The Aero Letňany A.10 was a biplane airliner produced in Czechoslovakia shortly after World War I. It was the first commercial aircraft to be built in Czechoslovakia and was known as the Ae-10 Limousine. It was designed by Husnik and Vlasak and was intended to meet the growing need for aerial communication to and from the country. Behind the single nose-mounted engine was a cabin with seats for three and two tables, upholstered on the underside, and able to be inverted to provide another two seats if required. A double skinned firewall between the engine and cabin, together with double skinned surfaces to the walls, floor and roof and Triplex windows gave a (relatively) quiet ride. A rear window gave communication with the pilot, whose open cockpit was above and behind the cabin. The cockpit also accommodated the navigator who had a seat directly behind the pilot.

The upper wings were in three sections with the small center section mounted on a tubular cabane and the lower wings were attached directly to the fuselage. Balanced ailerons were fitted to the top plane only and the petrol tank was fitted in the centre section. The fuselage was a deep rectangular section tapering to a vertical knife-edge at the rear, thus rendering a tail fin unnecessary. The tailplane carried two balanced elevators hinged to the stabilisers, and a balanced rudder was fitted to the top of the fuselage.

The first example of the A.10 flew for the first time on 3 January 1922. The A.10 was important as one of Československé Státní Aerolinie - (Czechoslovak State Airlines) first aircraft, with five examples in service with the airline from the time of its inception in 1923 until 1928, on the Prague to Bratislava route.

== Operators ==
Czechoslovakia

- Czechoslovak Airlines

== Specifications (A.10) ==
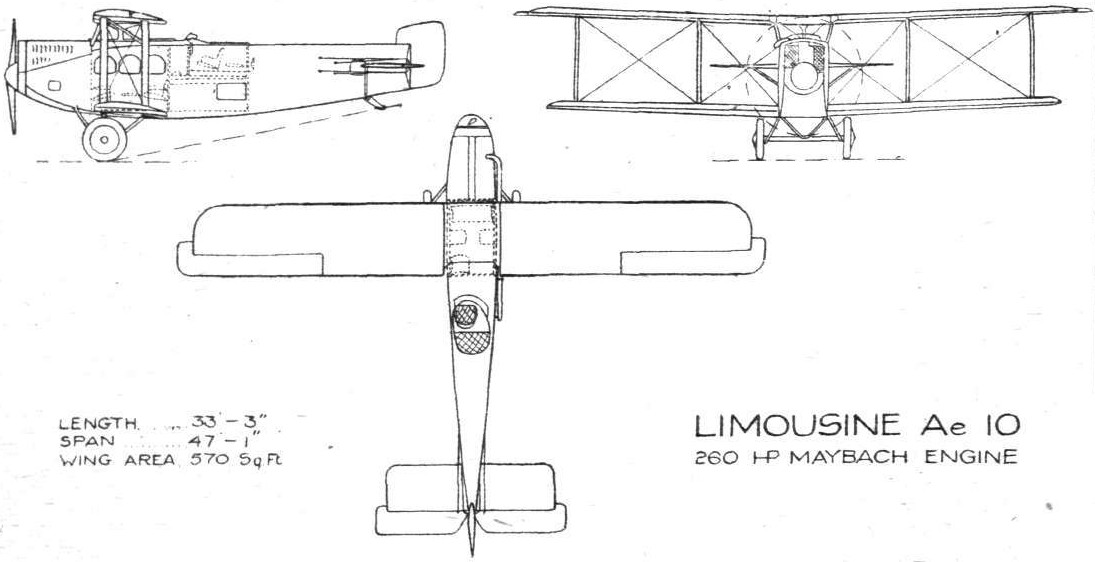
3-view drawing

Data from European Transport Aircraft since 1910,

General characteristics

- Crew: 2 (pilot, mechanic)
- Capacity: up to 5 passengers
- Length: 10.14 m (33 ft 3 in)
- Wingspan: 14.17 m (46 ft 6 in)
- Height: 3.56 m (11 ft 8 in)
- Wing area: 49 m^{2} (530 sq ft)
- Empty weight: 1,472 kg (3,245 lb)
- Max takeoff weight: 2,260 kg (4,982 lb)
- Powerplant: 1 × Maybach Mb.IVa 6-cyl. water-cooled piston engine, 190 kW (260 hp)
- Propellers: 2-bladed fixed-pitch wooden propeller

Performance

- Maximum speed: 160 km/h (99 mph, 86 kn)
- Cruise speed: 140 km/h (87 mph, 76 kn)
- Endurance: 4 hr
- Service ceiling: 6,000 m (20,000 ft)
- Time to altitude: 30 minutes to 10,000 ft (3,000 m)

== See also ==
Related lists

- List of civil aircraft
