= Árpád Habony =

Hungarian entrepreneur (born 1968)

Árpád Habony (born 1968) is a Hungarian entrepreneur, oligarch and longtime unofficial advisor to Viktor Orbán. He has been referred to as the "unacknowledged spin doctor" of Orbán, but his exact position is not formally stated. He is credited as the unofficial architect of the fake news, anti-immigration and negative propaganda campaign of Orbán's party, Fidesz. He and the late Arthur J. Finkelstein were shareholders in "Danube Business Consulting Ltd."

== Assault conviction ==
In 2006, he physically abused an elder couple on the street in Budapest for which he received two years probation.
