= Aero A.12 =

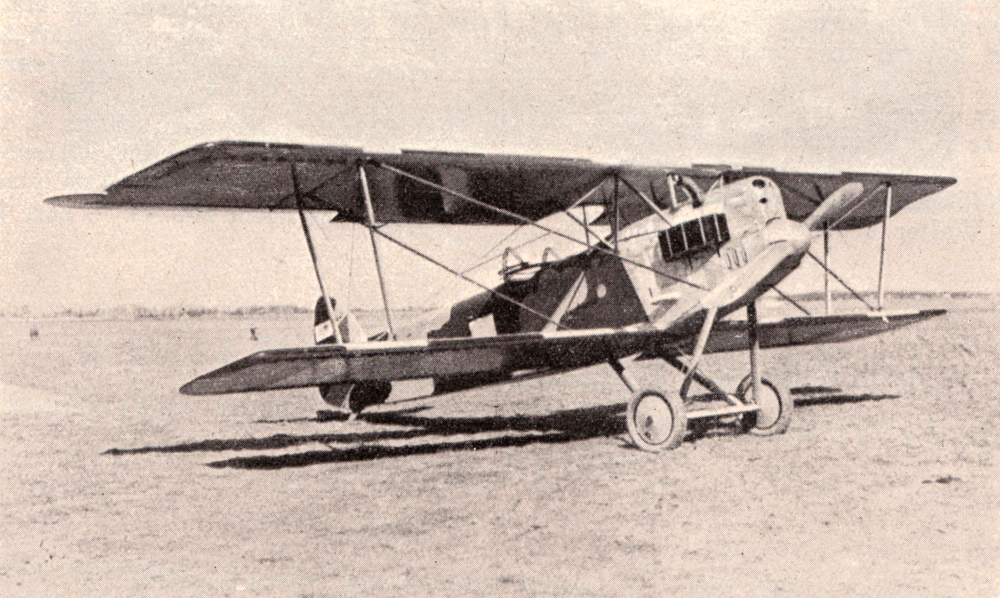

General information
- Type: Light bomber Reconnaissance aircraft
- Manufacturer: Aero Vodochody
- Status: Retired
- Primary user: Czechoslovakia

History
- Manufactured: early 1920s
- Developed from: Aero A.11

The Aero A.12 was a Czechoslovak biplane light bomber and military reconnaissance aircraft manufactured in small numbers shortly after World War I. Although reminiscent of the Hansa-Brandenburg-designed aircraft that Aero was building during the war under licence as the Ae.10, the A.12 was the company's own design. It is perhaps most significant as the direct descendant of the highly successful A.11 and its various derivatives. An example of the type is preserved at the Letecké Muzeum in Kbely.

== Operators ==
Czech Republic

- Czechoslovak Air Force.

== Specifications (A.12) ==
Data from Jane's all the World's Aircraft 1928, Aero A.12 - Specifications - Technical Data / Description

General characteristics

- Crew: 2
- Length: 8.3 m (27 ft 3 in)
- Wingspan: 12.8 m (42 ft 0 in)
- Height: 3.1 m (10 ft 2 in)
- Wing area: 36.9 m^{2} (397 sq ft)
- Empty weight: 1,080 kg (2,381 lb)
- Gross weight: 1,537 kg (3,389 lb)
- Powerplant: 1 × Maybach Mb.IV 6-cylinder water-cooled in-line piston engine, 180 kW (240 hp)
- Propellers: 2-bladed fixed pitch propeller

Performance

- Maximum speed: 201 km/h (125 mph, 109 kn)
- Range: 760 km (470 mi, 410 nmi)
- Service ceiling: 7,500 m (24,600 ft)
- Rate of climb: 3.47 m/s (683 ft/min)
- Wing loading: 42 kg/m^{2} (8.6 lb/sq ft)
- Power/mass: 0.120 kW/kg (0.073 hp/lb)

Armament

- 1× forward-firing synchronised 7.70 mm (0.303 in) Vickers machine gun in the upper forward fuselage decking
- 2× 7.70 mm (0.303 in) Lewis machine guns on a flexible mount for the observer in the rear cockpit

== See also ==
Aircraft of comparable role, configuration, and era

- Letov Š-6
- Macchi M.15

Related lists

- List of interwar military aircraft
