= Aero A.32 =

Army co-operation aircraft family

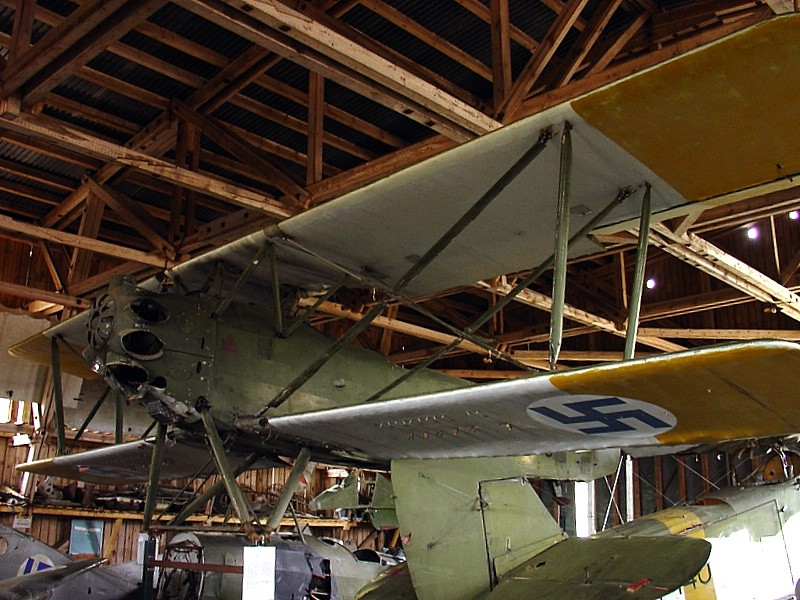
- Incomplete A.32 in the Finnish museum

General information
- Type: Reconnaissance – bomber
- Manufacturer: Aero
- Primary user: Czechoslovak Air Force; Finnish Air Force
- Number built: 116

History
- Introduction date: 1928
- First flight: 1927
- Retired: 1944

The Aero A.32 was a biplane built in Czechoslovakia in the late 1920s for army co-operation duties including reconnaissance and tactical bombing. While the design took the Aero A.11 as its starting point (and was originally designated A.11J), the aircraft incorporated significant changes to make it suited for its new low-level role.

Like the A.11 before it, the A.32 provided Aero with an export customer in the Finnish Air Force, which purchased 16 aircraft in 1929 as the A.32IF and A.32GR (which spent most of their service lives as trainers). They were assigned numbers AEj-49 – AEj-64 and were used until 1944. At least one aircraft has survived, AEj-59 is on the show of the Päijänne-Tavastia Aviation Museum.

A total of 116 of all variants were built.

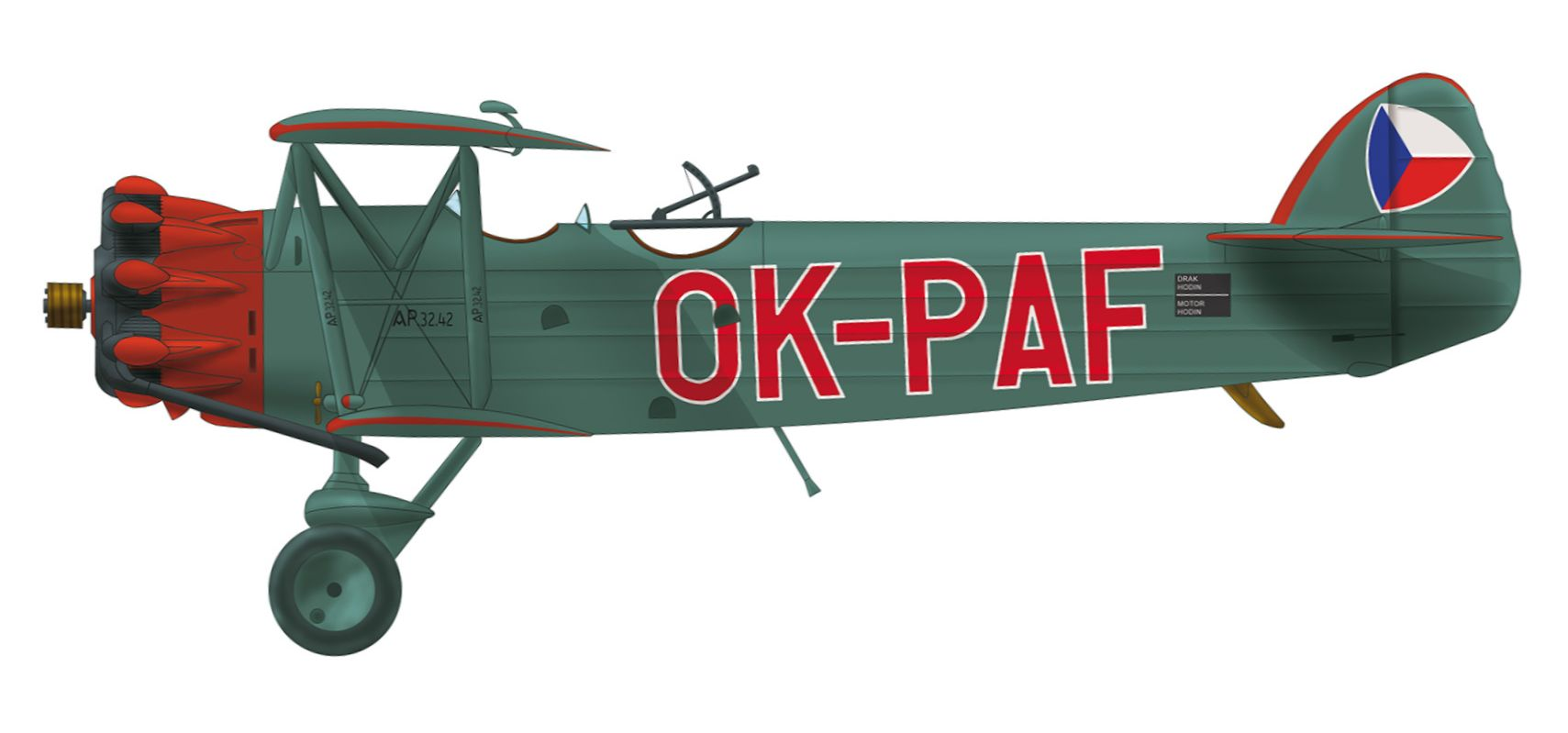
Aero Ap.32.42 used by the Czechoslovak National Security Guard in 1938

== History & Development ==
The first prototype, "A.11J", was flown in the summer of 1927. As the name suggests, it was the successor to the successful A.11 series of aircraft. Ab.11.17 was fitted with a licensed 309 kW (414 hp) nine-cylinder Walter Jupiter IV. The factory offered it to Ministry of Defence (Czechoslovakia) in April 1928 under the designation "A.32" as an escort fighter. The prototype A.32.1 was flown in October 1928 and the Air Force took it over in December. Meanwhile, it took part in demonstrations in Bulgaria and was subsequently also offered to the Turkish Air Force. The second prototype, A.32.2, was equipped with an 330 kW (440 hp) W Škoda L engine. The third prototype, A.32.3, was tested with another Walter Jupiter radial engine.

At the beginning of 1929 Aero offered the A.32 to Finland. After a successful demonstration, representatives of the Finnish Air Force brokered a contract for the delivery of 16 aircraft: one A.32IF with a 330 kW (440 hp) Isotta Fraschini Asso Caccia in-line engine and 15 A.32GR with a Gnome-Rhône 9 Jupiter radial engine. 8 aircraft were delivered in June 1929, and the rest later in 1929. 15 aircraft (designation AEj-49 to AEj-64) were delivered between August and October 1929 and one in 1930, with one serving until 30 June 1944.

On July 11, 1929, the Ministry of Defense ordered the production of six AP-32s with the Walter Jupiter IV engine (AP.32.4–AP.32.9) at the Aero factory, and on December 19, 1929, an order was placed for another 25 aircraft (AP.32.10–AP.32.34). Following the prototype tests and in cooperation with Výzkumný a zkušební letecký ústav, Aero offered an improved version, of which 45 units (AP.32.35–AP.32.79) were produced in the years 1930–1931 based on orders from August 1930 and January 1931. All of the original models were modified to an improved version at the request of the Air Force. This consisted of strengthening the fuselage, reconstruction of the landing gear, installation of brakes and new bomb hangers. In 1930, a formation of these combat and reconnaissance aircraft, led by the commander of the Czechoslovak Air Force, General Eng. Jaroslav Fajfr, successfully participated in the national aviation meeting in Bucharest.

The installation of a more powerful Walter Jupiter VI engine resulted in the APb.32 version, of which 35 units were produced until 1932 in two series (APb.32.80–APb.32.99 and APb.32.100–APb.32.114).

The AP.32/APb.32 served until the mid-1930s, when they were replaced by Letov Š.328s. By 1938 they were used only as training and second line machines. Four AP.32s loaned by the army (production numbers 7, 19, 20 and 42), along with Škoda D.1 were loaned for use by gendarmerie air patrols in July 1935.

During service with the Czechoslovak Air Force, 43 AP.32/APb.32 were written off due to crashed, in which 11 pilots and nine observers died. After the dissolution of the Czechoslovakia, five AP.32 and one APb.32 were inherited by the 3rd Aviation Regiment (replacement and 12th squadrons) in the Slovak Air Force. The others fell into the hands of the Luftwaffe, which continued to use them for a year with its training units.

Four A.32s were used by the police from 1935-1939 with the designations OK-PAD, OK-PAE, OK-PAF, & OK-PAI.

== Technical Description ==
The AP.32 and APb.32 were two-seater single-engine strut biplanes with fixed aft landing gear and open crew compartments. The metal frame of the fuselage was covered with aluminium sheets in the front part, the rest of the fuselage and the wooden frame of the wings were covered with canvas. The struts between the wings were made of steel tubes and covered with aerodynamic wood trim. A drop gasoline tank was placed in the canopy.

The AP.32 was powered by the 309 kW (414 hp) Walter Jupiter IV air-cooled radial nine-cylinder at first, then later by the 330 kW (440 hp) APb.32 Walter Jupiter VI, with a two-blade non-adjustable wooden propeller. The armament consisted of two synchronized 7.92 mm vz.28 air cooled machine guns in the hull, with the observer operating a twin mount vz. 28. The total supply of ammunition was 1100 rounds. Bombs up to a total weight of 120 kg for the AP.32 and 250 kg for the APb.32 could be hung under the lower wing.

== Existing Examples ==
The Aero AP-32 airplane is on display in the Kbely aviation museum. This aircraft is a partial replica. It was manufactured at Letecké opravny Trenčín in 1990 based on the original technical and production documentation. It is equipped with the camouflage of Aviation Regiment No. 1 of the Czechoslovak Air Force, which was based at Prague-Kbely Airport.

An incomplete Aero A-32GR (without engine) is on display at the Finnish Aviation Museum in Päijät-Häme.

== Variants ==
- A.32IF : Attack version for Finland, powered by a 450-hp (336-kW) Isotta Fraschini Asso Caccia piston engine. One machine.
- A.32GR : Attack version for Finland, powered by a 450-hp (336-kW) Gnome-Rhone built Bristol Jupiter radial piston engine. 15 machines.
- Ap.32 : Improved version for the Czech Air Force. Also known as the Apb.32.

== Operators ==
Czechoslovakia

- Czechoslovak Air Force
- Gendarmerie (Czechoslovakia)

Finland

- Finnish Air Force

Slovakia

- Slovak Air Force (1939–1945)

== Specifications (A.32) ==
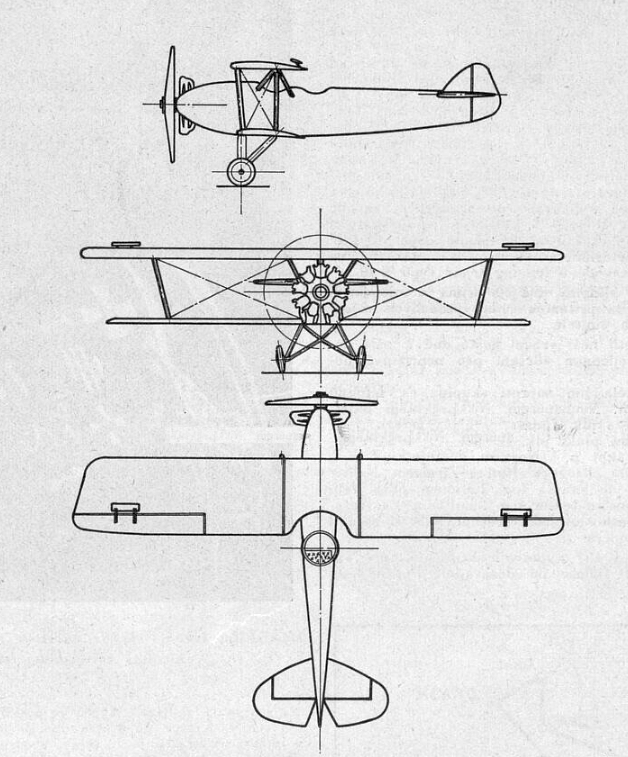
Aero AP.32, skica (Letectví, september 1930)

General characteristics

- Crew: 2 – pilot and observer
- Length: 8.2 m (26 ft 11 in)
- Wingspan: 12.4 m (40 ft 8 in)
- Height: 3.1 m (10 ft 2 in)
- Wing area: 36.5 m^{2} (393 sq ft)
- Empty weight: 1,046 kg (2,306 lb)
- Gross weight: 1,917 kg (4,226 lb)
- Powerplant: 1 × Gnome-Rhône built Bristol Jupiter 9-cyl. air-cooled radial piston engine, 313 kW (420 hp)

Performance

- Maximum speed: 226 km/h (140 mph, 122 kn)
- Range: 420 km (260 mi, 230 nmi)
- Service ceiling: 5,500 m (18,000 ft)
- Rate of climb: 2.85 m/s (561 ft/min)
- Wing loading: 53 kg/m^{2} (11 lb/sq ft)
- Thrust/weight: 0.160 kW/kg (0.10 hp/lb)

Armament

- Guns:
  - 2 × forward-firing .303 in (7.7 mm) Vickers machine guns
  - 2 × .303 in (7.7 mm) Lewis machine guns in flexible mount for observer
- Bombs: Up to 12 × 10 kg (22 lb) bombs

== Gallery ==
Aero AP.32 (Letectví, září 1930)	Aero AP.32 (Letectví, september 1930)	Aero A.32 (GR Jupiter engine)	Letecké muzeum Kbely (167)

== See also ==
Related development

- Aero A.11

Related lists

- List of interwar military aircraft
