= Aero A.25 =

General information
- Type: Trainer aircraft
- Manufacturer: Aero Vodochody
- Primary user: Czechoslovakia

History
- First flight: 1920s

The Aero A.25 was a biplane military trainer aircraft developed in Czechoslovakia from the Aero A.11 reconnaissance-bomber and generally similar to the Aero A.21 night trainer.

Some A.25s were powered by the less powerful 134 kW (180 hp) Breitfeld & Danek Perun I engines, in which case they were designated Aero A.125.

== Specifications (Aero A.25) ==
Data from Tschechoslowakische Flugzeuge : von 1918 bis heute

General characteristics

- Crew: 2
- Length: 8.1 m (26 ft 7 in)
- Wingspan: 12.8 m (42 ft 0 in)
- Height: 3.1 m (10 ft 2 in)
- Wing area: 36.2 m^{2} (390 sq ft)
- Empty weight: 985 kg (2,172 lb)
- Gross weight: 1,270 kg (2,800 lb)
- Powerplant: 1 × BMW IIIa 6-cylinder water-cooled in-line piston engine, 136 kW (182 hp)
- Propellers: 2-bladed fixed-pitch propeller

Performance

- Maximum speed: 160 km/h (99 mph, 86 kn)
- Service ceiling: 6,500 m (21,300 ft)
- Rate of climb: 4 m/s (790 ft/min)
- Wing loading: 35 kg/m^{2} (7.2 lb/sq ft)
- Power/mass: 0.110 kW/kg (0.067 hp/lb)

== Operators ==
- Czechoslovakia
