= Aéro Services Guépard Guépard 912 =

French two-seat microlight cabin monoplane

Guépard 912
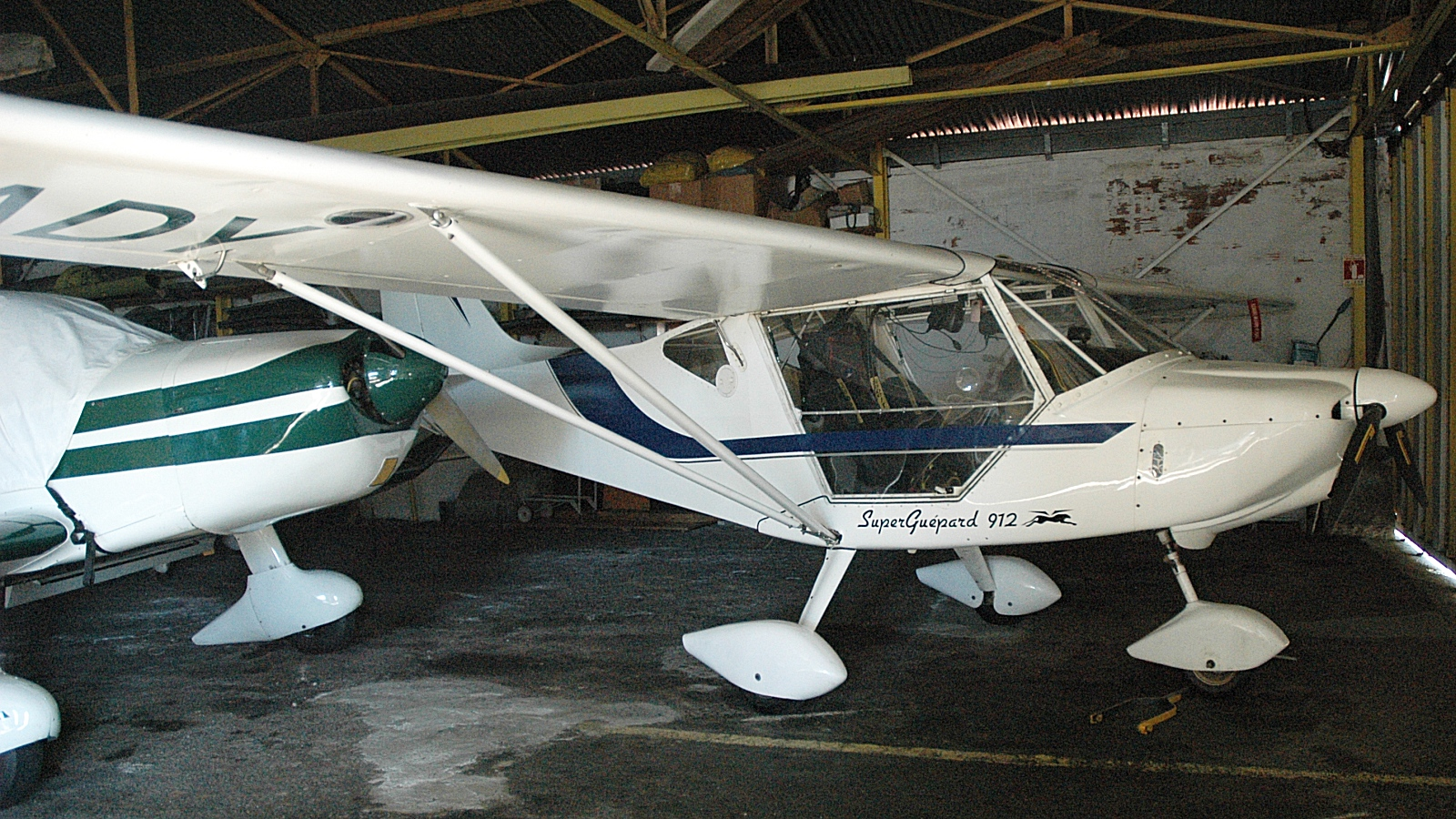

General information
- Type: Microlight cabin monoplane
- National origin: France
- Manufacturer: Aéro Services Guépard

The Aéro Services Guépard Guépard 912 (English: Cheetah) is a French two-seat microlight cabin monoplane designed and built by Aéro Services Guépard to meet the FAI Microlight standard, it is also sold as a kit of parts for amateur construction.

The Guépard 912 is a cabin monoplane with a braced high-mounted wing, it has a fixed tricycle landing gear and an enclosed cabin for two sitting in side-by-side configuration. The Guépard is built from welded steel tube with aircraft fabric covering but is also available with a riveted steel covering. Although capable of using a range of engines with power outputs from 65 to 100 hp (48 to 75 kW) the 80 hp (60 kW) Rotax 912 or the 100 hp (75 kW) Rotax 912S are normally used.

== Specifications ==
Data from World Directory of Leisure Aviation 2005/2006 and 2015/16

General characteristics

- Crew: one
- Capacity: one passenger
- Wingspan: 9.6 m (31 ft 6 in)
- Wing area: 14.60 m^{2} (157.2 sq ft)
- Empty weight: 282 kg (622 lb)
- Max takeoff weight: 472.5 kg (1,042 lb)
- Fuel capacity: 65 litres (14 imp gal; 17 US gal)
- Powerplant: 1 × Rotax 912S , 75 kW (100 hp)
- Propellers: 2-bladed composite

Performance

- Maximum speed: 190 km/h (120 mph, 100 kn)
- Cruise speed: 170 km/h (110 mph, 92 kn)
- Stall speed: 45 km/h (28 mph, 24 kn)
- Rate of climb: 5 m/s (980 ft/min)
