= Twin-boom aircraft =

Aircraft configuration utilizing two longitudinal booms for support of ancillary items

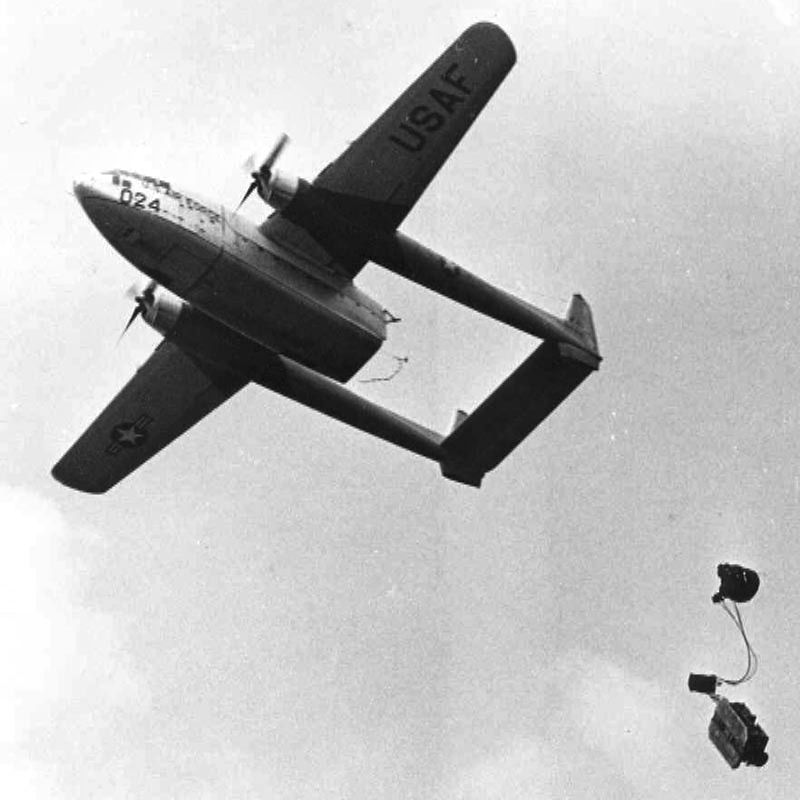
A Fairchild C-119 Flying Boxcar, doing a parachute drop from the rear

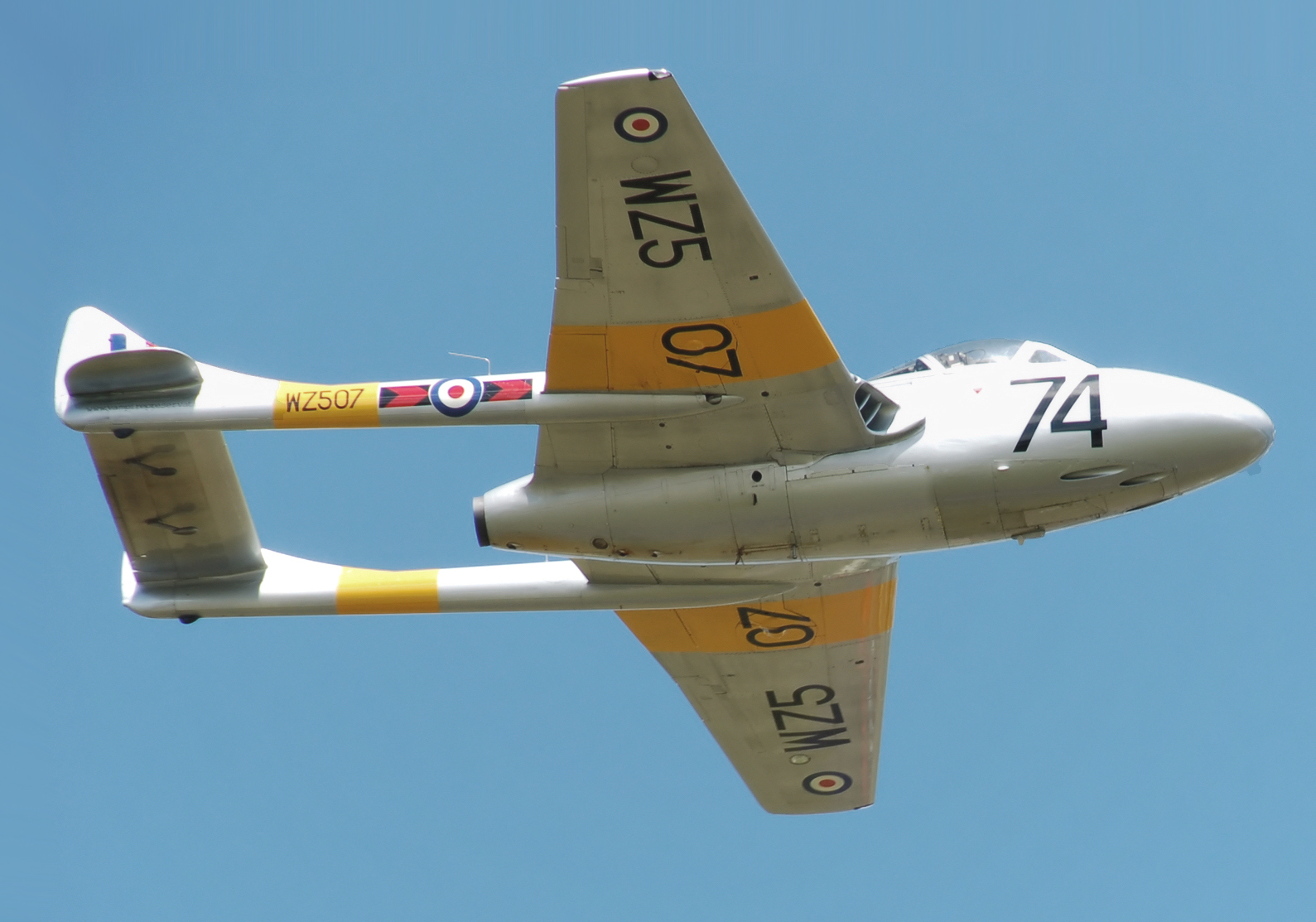
A de Havilland Vampire T.11, whose booms keep the rear fuselage clear of the jet exhaust

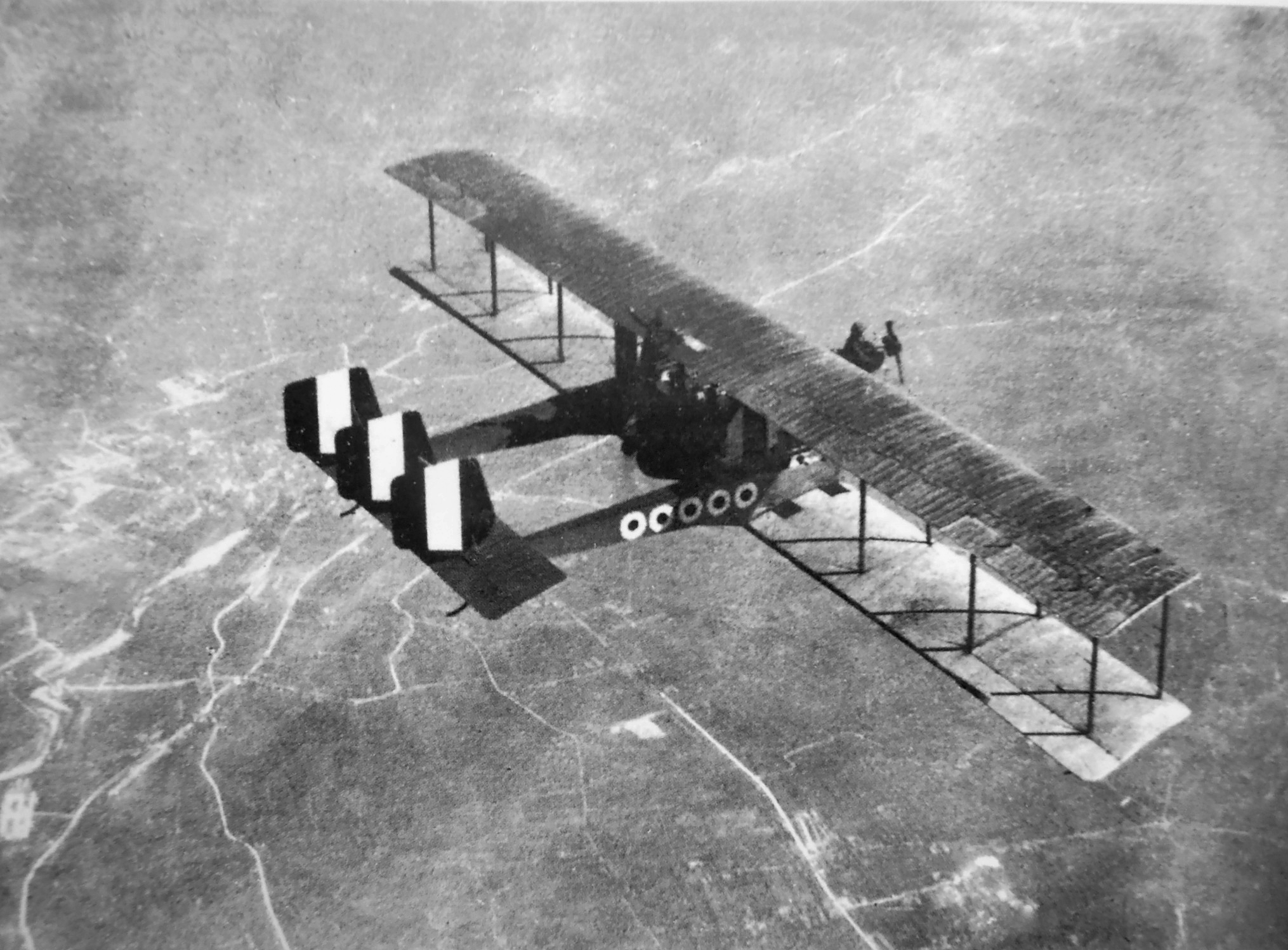
A Caproni Ca.3, whose booms provided clearance for a propeller - and a position for a gunner to fire to the rear

A twin-boom aircraft has two longitudinal auxiliary spars, or "auxiliary booms", that may contain ancillary components such as fuel tanks and/or provide a supporting structure for other items. Typically, twin tailbooms support the tail surfaces, although on some types such as the Rutan Model 72 Grizzly the booms run forward of the wing. The twin-boom configuration is distinct from twin-fuselage designs in that it retains a central fuselage.

== Design ==
The twin-boom configuration is distinct from the twin fuselage type in having a separate, short fuselage housing the pilot and payload. It has been adopted to resolve various design problems with the conventional empennage for aircraft in different roles.

=== Engine mounting ===
For a single engine with a propeller in the pusher configuration or a jet engine, a conventional tail requires the propeller or exhaust to be moved far aft, requiring either a very long driveshaft or jet pipe and thus reducing propulsive efficiency. The twin-boom configuration allows a much shorter and more efficient installation. The Saab 21 was originally built as a pusher type and was later adapted to jet power as the 21R.

In these designs, the tailplane (horizontal stabilizer) is typically high-mounted on twin tail fins to keep it clear of the engine wake. The Scaled Composites SpaceShipOne and SpaceShipTwo sub-orbital spaceplanes adopted twin booms with outboard tails or outboard horizontal stabilizers (OHS) to keep the airframe clear of the more widely-spreading rocket engine exhaust.

Twin booms have also been adopted for twin-engined designs where the engine system includes bulky additional items such as turbochargers and heat exchangers, taking up a large volume of space. Examples include the Lockheed P-38 Lightning.

=== Field of view ===
For a rear observation or gunnery position to have an unobstructed field of view, placing it at the rear of a conventional tail moves it so far aft that problems arise with the centre of mass and balancing the aircraft. Getting rid of the conventional empennage allows the rear position to be located more forward, resolving the balance problem. An example is provided by the Focke-Wulf Fw 189.

However the twin booms and bridging tailplane still obstruct the field of view to some extent and guns in this position are especially restricted in firing to the side.

=== Transport access ===
Loading and unloading large freight or cargo items such as vehicles and containers requires large access doors. In conventional designs these doors must be located at the nose or side of the fuselage, necessitating heavy reinforcement of the main structure. Side doors limit the length of an item to the width of the door and access may also be obstructed by engines or undercarriage. The twin-boom configuration allows a large door to be placed at the rear of the fuselage, free from obstruction by the tail assembly, as on the Armstrong Whitworth AW.660 Argosy.

However access to the rear door remains limited, especially for trucks backing up to it, and a high-mounted conventional rear fuselage is often preferred.

=== Efficiency ===
Twin booms typically offer greater drag than a conventional arrangement. They are also typically shallower than the fuselage and thus inherently less stiff, requiring additional reinforcement to maintain a rigid tail position in pitch. On the other hand, tip effects on the tailplane are avoided and it is supported at both ends, allowing it to be made smaller and lighter. Moreover, span loading along the wing can reduce the structural forces between the booms and thus overall weight.

Some modern high-efficiency designs have twin booms which distribute the load along the wing span and/or stiffen the overall structure. Capable of flying non-stop round the world, the Rutan Voyager was a canard design with tractor propeller, in which the twin booms extended forwards to brace the foreplane as well as aft to support twin fins. The later Virgin Atlantic GlobalFlyer was jet propelled but with a similar range, still with large twin booms to accommodate the jet fuel in a lightweight span-loaded structure, but with a small conventional tail on each boom.

== History ==
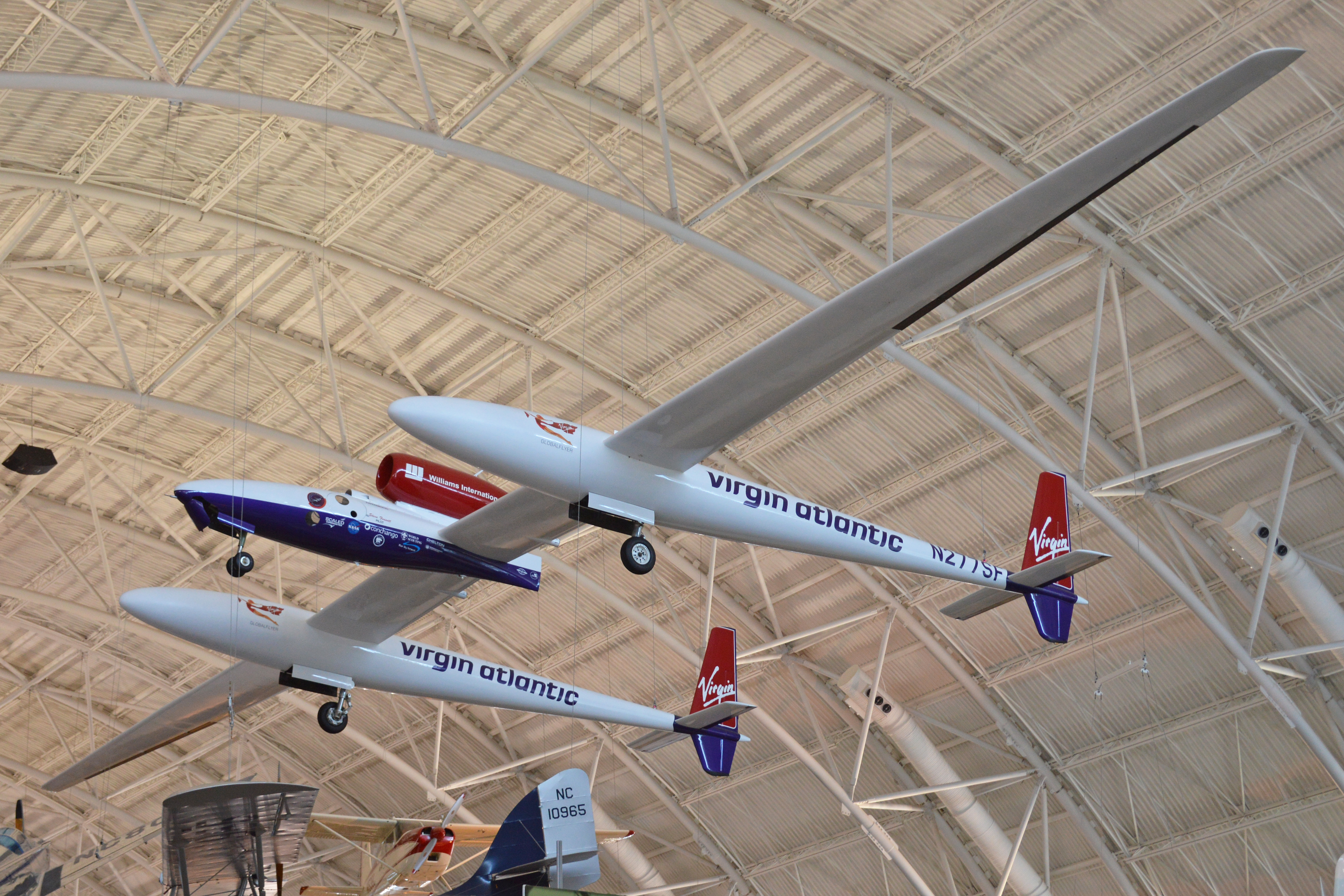
The Scaled Composites Virgin Atlantic GlobalFlyer, a twin-boom aircraft which in 2005 flew the first solo nonstop airplane flight around the world.

Twin boom designs can trace their history back to the lattices of booms used on many early boxkite aircraft. With the recognition of the tremendous drag these imposed, more compact structures covered in fabric were developed during the World War I. Prime examples include the Caproni series of trimotor bombers.

Around the same time, the first wooden monocoque fuselages appeared, and it wasn't long before this technique was applied to provide twin booms. Possibly the first of these was the pre-war Nieuport pusher, which used paper impregnated with Bakelite however the most successful were the AGO C.I and C.II which used a more conventional wooden shell, built up from strips of wood glued over a form. With the development of aluminium stressed skin monocoques later in World War I, the same technique was extended to twin boom designs, beginning in the 1920s.

Most of the early designs used twin booms to clear a rear mounted propeller, however even in World War I, several larger aircraft used them to provide a gunner with the ability to cover the underside of the tail without having to have the weight at the very extreme end of the aircraft where it posed balance and control problems.

Only in World War II, with the increasing prevalence of transporting bulky items and vehicles by air was the utility of a rear door, in line with the cabin to ease loading realized, and with it, the utility of moving the rear fuselage structure to the sides to avoid excessive height in the rear fuselage as on the Gotha Go 242 glider.

With the beginning of the jet age, the need for clearance for the propeller was replaced with the need to provide a clear path for hot exhaust gases. Jet engine efficiency was hampered by long intake and exhaust trunks, as were used on many early designs, and one solution was to use twin booms to shorten the exhaust trunking to the minimum, such as de Havilland used on their successful Vampire and Venom jet fighters.

A small number of designs used twin booms for other reasons, most notable being the Lockheed P-38 Lightning, whose booms contained the overly lengthy engine turbo-superchargers, which would have made for an unusually long nacelle. The final use for a twin boom to be developed was in tying together very high aspect ratio wings and canards as on the Rutan Voyager, to reduce flexing, and the weight needed to otherwise constrain it. Also, by having the mass from most of the fuel mid-span, it reduces the forces on the wings considerably, much in the same manner mounting the engines mid-span on most jet transports does.

Despite these anticipated benefits, twin booms remain unusual. For most cases, the booms are less efficient structurally in providing pitch stiffness, and produce more drag. In the case of those using twin booms to improve the field of fire downwards, it severely reduces it laterally, and often directly astern. For transports, the booms may facilitate access to the fuselage, but trucks then have to be extremely careful to not hit parts of the aircraft that they are then getting closer to. As a result, the C-119 remained an anomaly, and most successful post-war transports, such as the C-130 Hercules, reverted to a single rear fuselage.

== List of twin-boom aircraft ==
Type	Country	Class	Role	Date	Status	No.	Notes
AAI RQ-7 Shadow	US	UAV	UAV	1991			
Abrams P-1 Explorer	US	Propeller	Survey	1937	Prototype	1	
AD Seaplane Type 1000	UK	Propeller	Bomber	1916	Prototype	2	
Adam A500	US	Propeller	Transport	2002	Prototype	7	
Adam A700	US	Jet	Transport	2003	Prototype	2	
ADI Condor	US	Propeller	Motor glider	1981	Prototype	1	
AeroRIK Dingo	Russia	Propeller	Utility	1997	Prototype	1-5	
AGO C.I	Germany	Propeller	Reconnaissance	1915	Production	64	
AGO C.II	Germany	Propeller	Reconnaissance	1915	Production	15	
AHRLAC Holdings Ahrlac	South Africa	Propeller	Attack	2014	Prototype	1	
Air Utility AU-18	US	Propeller	Transport	1945	Prototype	1	
Airmaster Avalon 680	US	Propeller	Transport	1983	Prototype	1	
Airsport Song	Czech Republic	Propeller	Ultralight	2009	Production		
AISA GN	Spain	Autogyro	Utility	1982	Prototype	1	
Akaflieg Stuttgart fs28 Avispa	Germany	Propeller	Utility	1972	Prototype	1	
Alaparma Baldo	Italy	Propeller	Utility	1949	Production	35 ca.	
Alenia Aermacchi Sky-Y	Italy	UAV	UAV	2007			
American Gyro AG-4 Crusader	US	Propeller	Utility	1935	Prototype	1	
Antonov LEM-2/OKA-33	USSR	Propeller	Transport	1937	Prototype	1	
Anderson Greenwood AG-14	US	Propeller	Utility	1947	Prototype	5	
ANTEX-M	Portugal	UAV	UAV	2002			
Antonov A-40	USSR	Glider	Transport	1942	Prototype	1	Air towed gliding tank
Arado E.340	Germany	Propeller	Bomber	n/a	Project	0	
Armstechno NITI	Bulgaria	UAV	UAV	2006			
Armstrong Whitworth AW.660 Argosy	UK	Propeller	Transport	1959	Production	74	
Arpin A-1	UK	Propeller	Utility	1938	Prototype	1	
AVE Mizar	US	Propeller	Flying car	1973	Prototype	2	
BAE Systems Phoenix	UK	UAV	UAV	1986			
BAE Systems SkyEye	UK	UAV	UAV	1973			
BAT Crow	UK	Propeller	Ultralight	1920	Prototype	1	
Baykar Bayraktar TB2	Turkey	UAV	UAV	2014			
Baykar Bayraktar TB3	Turkey	UAV	UAV	2022	Project		
Bell XP-52	US	Propeller	Fighter	1940	Project	0	
Belyayev EOI	USSR	Propeller	Fighter	1939	Project	0	
Bendix 51 & 51A	US	Propeller	Utility	1945	Prototype	2	
Bestetti BN.1	Italy	Propeller	Utility	1940	Prototype	1	
Blériot 125	France	Propeller	Transport	1931	Prototype	1	
Blohm & Voss BV 138	Germany	Propeller	Reconnaissance	1937	Production	297	
Boeing Insitu RQ-21 Blackjack	US	UAV	UAV	2012			
Bryan Autoplane	US	Propeller	Flying car	1953	Prototype	2	
Bryant Dole Racer Angel of Los Angeles	US	Propeller	Racer	1927	Prototype	1	
Burnelli CBY-3	Canada	Propeller	Transport	1944	Prototype	1	
Burnelli GX-3	US	Propeller	Experimental	1929	Prototype	1	
Burnelli UB-14	US	Propeller	Transport	1934	Prototype	2	
Burnelli UB-20	US	Propeller	Transport	1930	Prototype	1	
Buscaylet-de Monge 7-4	France	Propeller	Experimental	1923	Prototype	1	
Buscaylet-de Monge 7-5	France	Propeller	Transport	1925	Prototype	1	
Campbell Model F	US	Propeller	Utility	1935	Prototype	1	
Canaero Toucan	Canada	Propeller	Ultralight	1983	Production	41+	
Caproni Ca.1	Italy	Propeller	Bomber	1914	Production	162	
Caproni Ca.2	Italy	Propeller	Bomber	1915	Production	9	
Caproni Ca.3	Italy	Propeller	Bomber	1916	Production	269-383	
Caproni Ca.4	Italy	Propeller	Bomber	1917	Production	44-53	
Caproni Ca.5	Italy	Propeller	Bomber	1917	Production	662	
Caproni Ca.37	Italy	Propeller	Attack	1916	Prototype	1	
Caproni Ca.61	Italy	Propeller	Bomber	1922	Prototype	1-2	
CarterCopter	US	Autogyro	Transport	1998	Prototype	1	
Celier Xenon 2	Poland	Autogyro	Utility	2005	Production	100+	
Cessna Skymaster	US	Propeller	Transport	1961	Production	2,993	
Cessna XMC	US	Propeller	Experimental	1971	Prototype	1	
Commuter Craft Innovator	US	Propeller	Transport	2015	Prototype	1	
Conroy Stolifter	US	Propeller	Utility	1968	Prototype	1	
Continental KB-1	US	Propeller	Reconnaissance	1916	Prototype	1	
Convair 106 Skycoach	US	Propeller	Utility	1946	Prototype	1	
Convair Model 48 Charger	US	Propeller	Attack	1964	Prototype	1	
Creative Flight Aerocat	Canada	Propeller	Transport	2001	Prototype	1	
Cunliffe-Owen OA-1	UK	Propeller	Transport	1939	Prototype	1	
Curtis Wright 21	US	Propeller	Utility	1947	Prototype	1	
Curtiss Autoplane	US	Propeller	Flying car	1917	Project	1	
Curtiss CT	US	Propeller	Bomber	1921	Prototype	1	
De Havilland Sea Vixen	UK	Jet	Fighter	1951	Production	145	
De Havilland Vampire	UK	Jet	Fighter	1943	Production	3,268	
De Havilland Venom & Sea Venom	UK	Jet	Fighter	1952	Production	1,431	
De Schelde S.20	Netherlands	Propeller	Trainer	1940	Prototype	1	
De Schelde S.21	Netherlands	Propeller	Fighter	1940	Project	1	
Diemert Defender	Canada	Propeller	Counter-insurgency	1989	Prototype	1	
Difoga 421	Netherlands	Propeller	Utility	1946	Prototype	1	
Dyle et Bacalan DB-70	France	Propeller	Transport	1929	Prototype	1	
Doblhoff WNF 342	Germany	Helicopter	Reconnaissance	1943	Prototype	3	
DRDO Nishant	India	UAV	UAV	1996			
Edgley Optica	UK	Propeller	Reconnaissance	1979	Production	22	
Eldred Flyer's Dream	US	Propeller	Utility	1946	Prototype	1	
Emsco B-8 Flying Wing	US	Propeller	Record	1930	Prototype	1	
Fairchild C-82 Packet	US	Propeller	Transport	1944	Production	223	
Fairchild C-119 Flying Boxcar	US	Propeller	Transport	1947	Production	1,183	
Fairchild XC-120 Packplane	US	Propeller	Transport	1950	Prototype	1	
Fieseler Fi 168	Germany	Propeller	Attack	1938	Project		
Focke-Wulf Fw 189	Germany	Propeller	Reconnaissance	1938	Production	864	
Focke-Wulf Flitzer	Germany	Jet	Fighter	1944	Project	0	
Focke-Wulf Project VIII	Germany	Propeller	Fighter	n/a	Project	0	
Fokker D.XXIII	Netherlands	Propeller	Fighter	1939	Prototype	1	
Fokker F.25	Netherlands	Propeller	Utility	1946	Production	20	
Fokker G.I	Netherlands	Propeller	Fighter	1937	Production	63	
Friedrichshafen FF.34	Germany	Propeller	Bomber	1916	Prototype	1	
General Airborne XCG-16	US	Glider	Transport	1943	Prototype	2	
General Aircraft Cagnet	UK	Propeller	Trainer	1939	Prototype	1	
General Aircraft GAL.47	UK	Propeller	Reconnaissance	1940	Prototype	1	
Ghods Mohajer	Iran	UAV	UAV	1981			
Gotha Go 242	Germany	Glider	Transport	1941	Production	1,528	
Gotha Go 244	Germany	Propeller	Transport	1942	Production	174	
Gotha WD.3	Germany	Propeller	Reconnaissance	1915	Prototype	1	
Grahame-White Ganymede	UK	Propeller	Bomber	1918	Prototype	1	
Groen Hawk 4	US	Autogyro	Utility	1997	Prototype	3	
Grokhovsky G-37	USSR	Propeller	Transport	1934	Prototype	1	
Grokhovsky G-38	USSR	Propeller	Fighter-bomber	1934	Project	0	
Grokhovsky G-39 Cucaracha	USSR	Propeller	Fighter	1935	Prototype	1	
Häfeli DH-1	Switzerland	Propeller	Reconnaissance	1916	Production	6	
Hanriot H.110 & H.115	France	Propeller	Fighter	1933	Prototype	1	
Harbin BZK-005	China	UAV	UAV	2006	Production	100+	
Henderson H.S.F.1	UK	Propeller	Transport	1929	Prototype	1	
Heston JC.6	UK	Propeller	Reconnaissance	1947	Prototype	2	
Hughes D-2	US	Propeller	Fighter-bomber	1942	Prototype	1	
Hughes XF-11	US	Propeller	Reconnaissance	1946	Prototype	2	
HWL Pegaz	Poland	Propeller	Motor glider	1949	Prototype	1	
Hydra Technologies Ehécatl	Mexico	UAV	UAV	2006			
IAI Arava	Israel	Propeller	Transport	1969	Production	103	
IAI Heron	Israel	UAV	UAV	1994			
IAI Scout	Israel	UAV	UAV	1981			
IAI Searcher	Israel	UAV	UAV	1992			
Ikarus 452M	Yugoslavia	Jet	Experimental	1953	Prototype	2	
Ion Aircraft Ion	US	Propeller	Utility	2007	Prototype	1	
I.S.T. XL-15 Tagak	Philippines	Propeller	Utility	1954	Prototype	1	
Johns Multiplane	US	Propeller	Bomber	1919	Prototype	1	
Kalinin K-7	USSR	Propeller	Experimental	1933	Prototype	1	
Kaman HH-43 Huskie	US	Helicopter	Utility	1947	Production	193	
Kamov Ka-26	USSR	Helicopter	Utility	1965	Production	816	
Kamov Ka-126	USSR	Helicopter	Utility	1988	Production	17	
Kamov Ka-226	Russia	Helicopter	Utility	1997	Production	69	
Kingsford Smith PL.7	Australia	Propeller	Agricultural	1956	Prototype	1	
Kokusai Ki-105 Otori	Japan	Propeller	Transport	1945	Prototype	9	
Kokusai Ku-7	Japan	Glider	Transport	1942	Prototype	2	
Kortenbach & Rauh Kora 1	Germany	Propeller	Motor glider	1973	Prototype	2	
Larkin Skylark	US	Propeller	Utility	1973	Prototype	1	
Lawrence Special	US	Propeller	Racer	1949	Prototype	1	
Levasseur PL.200/201	France	Propeller	Reconnaissance	1935	Prototype	1	
Lockheed P-38 Lightning	US	Propeller	Fighter	1939	Production	10,037	
Lockheed XP-49	US	Propeller	Fighter	1942	Prototype	1	
Lockheed XP-58 Chain Lightning	US	Propeller	Fighter	1944	Prototype	1	
Lloyd 40.08 Luftkreuzer	Germany	Propeller	Bomber	1916	Prototype	1	
LWF model H Owl	US	Propeller	Transport	1919	Prototype	1	
Maeda Ku-1	Japan	Glider	Trainer	1941	Production	100	
Macchi M.12	Italy	Propeller	Bomber	1918	Production	10 ca.	
Mansyū Ki-98	Japan	Propeller	Attack	1945	Prototype	1	
McCulloch J-2	US	Autogyro	Utility	1962	Production	83+	
McDonnell XV-1	US	Autogyro	Experimental	1954	Prototype	2	
McGaffey Aviate	US	Propeller	Utility	1935	Prototype	1	
Millet Lagarde ML-10	France	Propeller	Utility	1949	Prototype	2	
Mikoyan MiG-110	Russia	Propeller	Transport	1995	Project	0	
Mirach 26	Italy	UAV	UAV	1992			
Mitsubishi J4M	Japan	Propeller	Fighter	n/a	Project	0	
Moskalyev SAM-13	USSR	Propeller	Fighter	1940	Prototype	1	
Moskalyev SAM-23	USSR	Propeller	Fighter	1943	Project	0	
Myasishchev M-17 and M-55	USSR	Jet	Reconnaissance	1978	Production	8+	
New Era Model A	US	Propeller	Civil	n/a	Prototype	1	
NASA Mini-Sniffer (II and III)	US	Propeller	UAV	n/a	Prototype	2	
Nieuport seaplane pusher	France	Propeller	Reconnaissance	1913	Prototype	1	
Nord Noratlas	France	Propeller	Transport	1949	Production	425	
North American OV-10 Bronco	US	Propeller	Attack	1965	Production	360	
Northrop F-15 Reporter	US	Propeller	Reconnaissance	1945	Production	36	
Northrop Flying Wing	US	Propeller	Experimental	1929	Prototype	1	
Northrop Grumman Firebird	US	Propeller	Reconnaissance	2010	Prototype	1	
Northrop P-61 Black Widow	US	Propeller	Fighter	1942	Production	706	
NPO Molniya Molniya-1	Russia	Propeller	Utility	1992	Prototype	2	
OMA SUD Skycar	Italy	Propeller	Utility	2007	Prototype	1	
Otto C.I	Germany	Propeller	Reconnaissance	1915	Production	25	
PAL-V	Netherlands	Helicopter	Flying car	2012	Prototype	1	
Piper PA-7 Skycoupe	US	Propeller	Utility	1944	Prototype	1	
Pitcairn XO-61	US	Autogyro	Reconnaissance	1943	Prototype	2	
Pocino PJ.1A	France	Propeller	Ultralight	1989	Prototype	1	
Portsmouth Aerocar	UK	Propeller	Utility	1947	Prototype	1	
Potez 75	France	Propeller	Attack	1953	Prototype	1	
Praga E-51	Czechoslovakia	Propeller	Reconnaissance	1938	Prototype	1	
Puget Pacific Wheelair III-A	US	Propeller	Utility	1947	Prototype	1	
PZL M-15 Belphegor	Poland	Jet	Agricultural	1973	Production	175	
PZL M-17	Poland	Propeller	Trainer	1973	Prototype	1	
Raybird-3	Ukraine	UAV	UAV	2014	In service		
Rice Knowlton Volante	US	Propeller	Flying Car	1981	Prototype	1	
Rutan Grizzly	US	Propeller	Experimental	1982	Prototype	1	
Rocheville Arctic Tern	US	Propeller	Record	1932	Prototype	1	
Rotor Flight Dynamics LFINO	US	Autogyro	Experimental	2006	Prototype	1	
RTAF-5	Thailand	Propeller	Trainer	1984	Prototype	1	
RUAG Ranger	Switzerland / Israel	UAV	UAV	1999			
Rutan Voyager	US	Propeller	Record	1984	Production	1	
S-TEC Sentry	US	UAV	UAV	1986			
Saab 21	Sweden	Propeller	Fighter	1943	Production	298	
Saab 21R	Sweden	Jet	Fighter	1947	Production	64	
SAB AB-20 & 21	France	Propeller	Bomber	1932	Prototype	2	
Sadler Vampire	US	Propeller	Ultralight	1982	Production		
SAIMAN LB.2	Italy	Propeller	Utility	1937	Prototype	1	
Savoia-Marchetti S.64	Italy	Propeller	Record	1928	Prototype	2	
Savoia-Marchetti S.65	Italy	Propeller	Racer	1929	Prototype	1	
Savoia-Marchetti SM.88	Italy	Propeller	Fighter	1939	Prototype	1	
Savoia-Marchetti SM.91	Italy	Propeller	Fighter-bomber	1943	Prototype	1	
Scaled Composites ARES	US	Jet	Attack	1990	Prototype	1	
Scaled Composites ATTT	US	Propeller	Transport	1986	Prototype	1	
Scaled Composites Pond Racer	US	Propeller	Racer	1991	Prototype	1	
Scaled Composites Proteus	US	Jet	Experimental	1991	Prototype	1	
Scaled Composites SpaceShipOne	US	Rocket	Spaceplane	2003	Prototype	1	
Scaled Composites SpaceShipTwo	US	Rocket	Spaceplane	2010	Prototype	2	
Scaled Composites White Knight	US	Jet	Transport	2002	Prototype	1	
Schneider Sch-10M	France	Propeller	Bomber	1925	Prototype	1	
Schwade Kampfeinsitzer Nr 2	Germany	Propeller	Fighter	1916	Prototype	1	
Schweizer RU-38 Twin Condor	US	Propeller	Reconnaissance	1995	Prototype	5	
SECAN Courlis	France	Propeller	Utility	1946	Production	144	
Selex ES Falco	Italy	UAV	UAV	2003			
SIAI-Marchetti FN.333 Riviera	Italy	Propeller	Utility	1952	Production	29	
Siemens-Schuckert L.I	Germany	Propeller	Bomber	1918	Prototype	3	
Siemens-Schuckert R.I	Germany	Propeller	Bomber	1915	Prototype	1	
Sikorsky S-38	US	Propeller	Transport	1928	Production	101	
Sikorsky S-39	US	Propeller	Transport	1929	Production	23+	
Sikorsky S-40	US	Propeller	Transport	1931	Production	3	
Sikorsky S-41	US	Propeller	Transport	1930	Production	7	
SIPA S.200 Minijet	France	Jet	Trainer	1952	Prototype	7	
Škoda Kauba Sk V6	Czechoslovakia	Propeller	Experimental	1944	Prototype	1	
SNCAC NC.1070	France	Propeller	Attack	1947	Prototype	1	
SNCAC NC.1071	France	Jet	Attack	1948	Prototype	1	
SNCASO SO.8000 Narval	France	Propeller	Fighter	1949	Prototype	2	
SPCA 30	France	Propeller	Bomber	1931	Prototype	2	
Spectrum SA-550	US	Propeller	Utility	1983	Prototype	2+	
Stearman-Hammond Y-1	US	Propeller	Utility	1931	Production	20 ca.	
Stout Skycar	US	Propeller	Transport	1941	Prototype	4	
Sukhoi Su-12	USSR	Propeller	Reconnaissance	1947	Prototype	1	
Sukhoi Su-80	Russia	Propeller	Transport	2001	Prototype	8	
Tachikawa Ki-94-I	Japan	Propeller	Fighter	n/a	Project	0	
TAI Baykuş	Turkey	UAV	UAV	2003			
Teledyne Ryan Model 410	US	UAV	UAV	1988			
Tengden TB-001	China	UAV	UAV	2017	Production		
Terrafugia Transition	US	Propeller	Flying car	2009	Prototype	2	
THK-11	Turkey	Propeller	Utility	1947	Prototype	1	
Thomas-Morse MB-4	US	Propeller	Transport	1920	Prototype	4	
Transavia PL-12 Airtruk	Australia	Propeller	Agricultural	1965	Production	118	
Trella T-106	US	Propeller	Utility	1949	Prototype	1	
Trella T-107	US	Propeller	Transport	1954	Project	0	
Tupolev I-12/ANT-23	USSR	Propeller	Fighter	1931	Prototype	1	
Vance Viking	US	Propeller	Racer	1932	Prototype	1	
Virgin Atlantic GlobalFlyer	US	Jet	Record	2005	Production	1	
Voisin E.28	France	Propeller	Bomber	1919	Prototype	1	
Voisin Triplane	France	Propeller	Bomber	1915	Prototype	1	
Vultee XP-54	US	Propeller	Fighter	1943	Prototype	2	
Vultee XP-68 Tornado	US	Propeller	Fighter	n/a	Project	0	
Wagner Aerocar	Germany	Helicopter	Flying car	1965	Prototype	1	
Weick W-1	US	Propeller	Experimental	1934	Prototype	1	
Weymann 66	France	Propeller	Transport	1933	Prototype	1	
Willoughby Delta 8	UK	Propeller	Experimental	1939	Prototype	1	
Willoughby Delta 9	UK	Propeller	Transport	1939	Project	0	
WLT Sparrow	Czech Republic	Propeller	Ultralight	2010	Production	13	
WNF Wn 16	Austria	Propeller	Experimental	1939	Prototype	1	
Yakovlev Yak-58	Russia	Propeller	Utility	1993	Prototype	7	
Yakovlev Yak-141	Russia	Jet	Fighter	1987	Prototype	4	

== See also ==
- Twin tail
