= Aviméta 21 =

The designation Aviméta 21 is used in various sources to refer to different and unrelated aircraft built by the Aviméta company:

- Schneider Sch-10M
- Aviméta 121
