= AGO C.VIII =

German prototype reconnaissance biplane

C.VIII
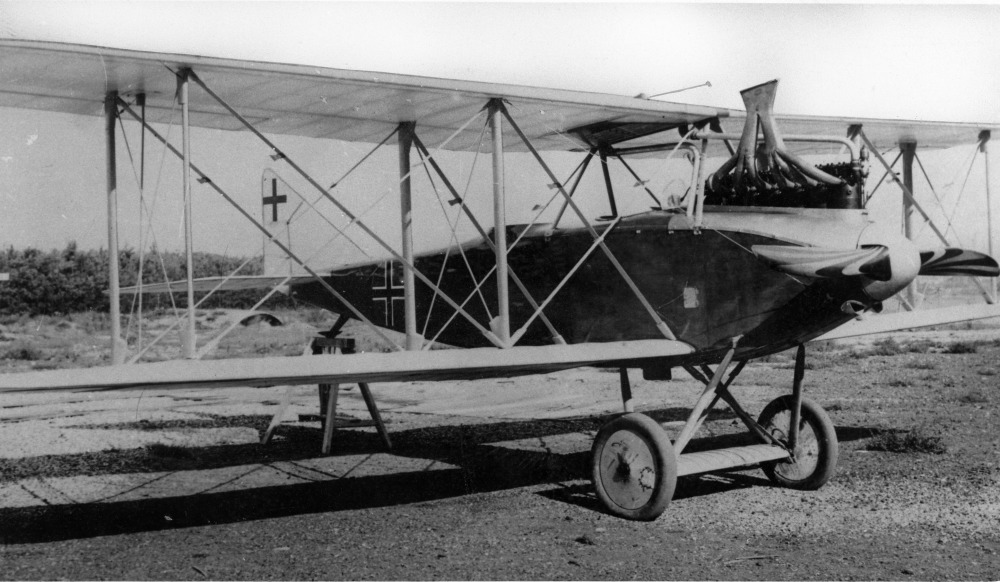
- AGO C.VIII with 2-bay struts

General information
- Type: Reconnaissance
- Manufacturer: AGO Flugzeugwerke
- Status: prototype only
- Number built: 2

History
- First flight: 1917

The AGO C.VIII was a German reconnaissance aircraft built by AGO Flugzeugwerke during World War I.

== Design ==
The C.VIII was a derivative of the AGO C.IV with a Mercedes D.IVa. Only a single prototype was built.

== Specifications ==
Data from German Aircraft of the First World War

General characteristics

- Crew: 2
- Length: 8.95 m (29 ft 4 in)
- Wingspan: 12.80 m (42 ft 0 in)
- Height: 2.80 m (9 ft 2 in)
- Powerplant: 1 × Mercedes D.IVa 6-cyl. water-cooled in-line piston engine, 190 kW (260 hp)

Performance Armament

- Guns:
- 1x 7.92 mm Parabellum gun
- 1x Spandau machine gun

== Bibliography ==
- Taylor, Michael J. H. (1989). Jane's Encyclopedia of Aviation. London: Studio Editions. p. 40.
- Gray, Peter; Owen Thetford (1970). German Aircraft of the First World War (2nd ed.). London: Putnam & Company Ltd. pp. 13–16. ISBN 0-370-00103-6.
