= Tail boom =

Tail boom might refer to:

- Empennage, the tail of an airplane
- a Helicopter tail

== See also ==
- Twin-boom aircraft
