= AGO C.VII =

German prototype reconnaissance biplane

C.VII
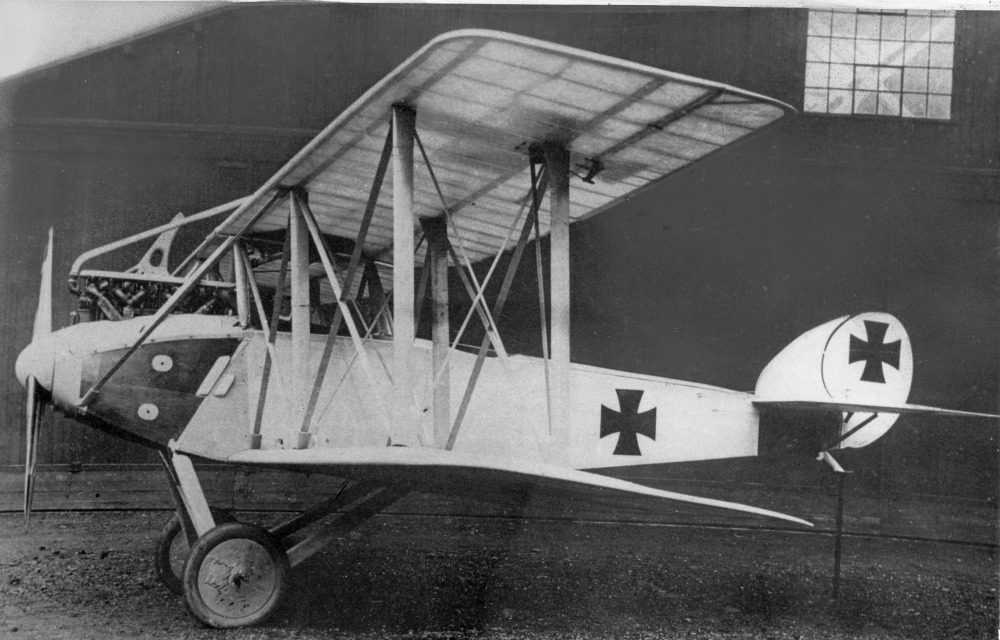
- AGO C.VII in side view

General information
- Type: Reconnaissance
- Manufacturer: AGO Flugzeugwerke
- Status: prototype only
- Number built: 1

History
- First flight: 1916

The AGO C.VII was a prototype German reconnaissance aircraft of World War I.

== Design ==
In the C.VII, AGO attempted to improve upon its C.IV design by revising the wing bracing. The vertical fin and rudder were similar to that seen on the AGO C.V and AGO C.VI.

== Operational history ==
After the end of World War I, the sole C.VII prototype was sold the Estonian Air Force.

== Operators ==
- Estonian Air Force

== Specifications ==
- Powerplant: one 200 hp Benz Bz.IV inline engine
