= Thai Aviation Industries RTAF-6 =

RTAF-6
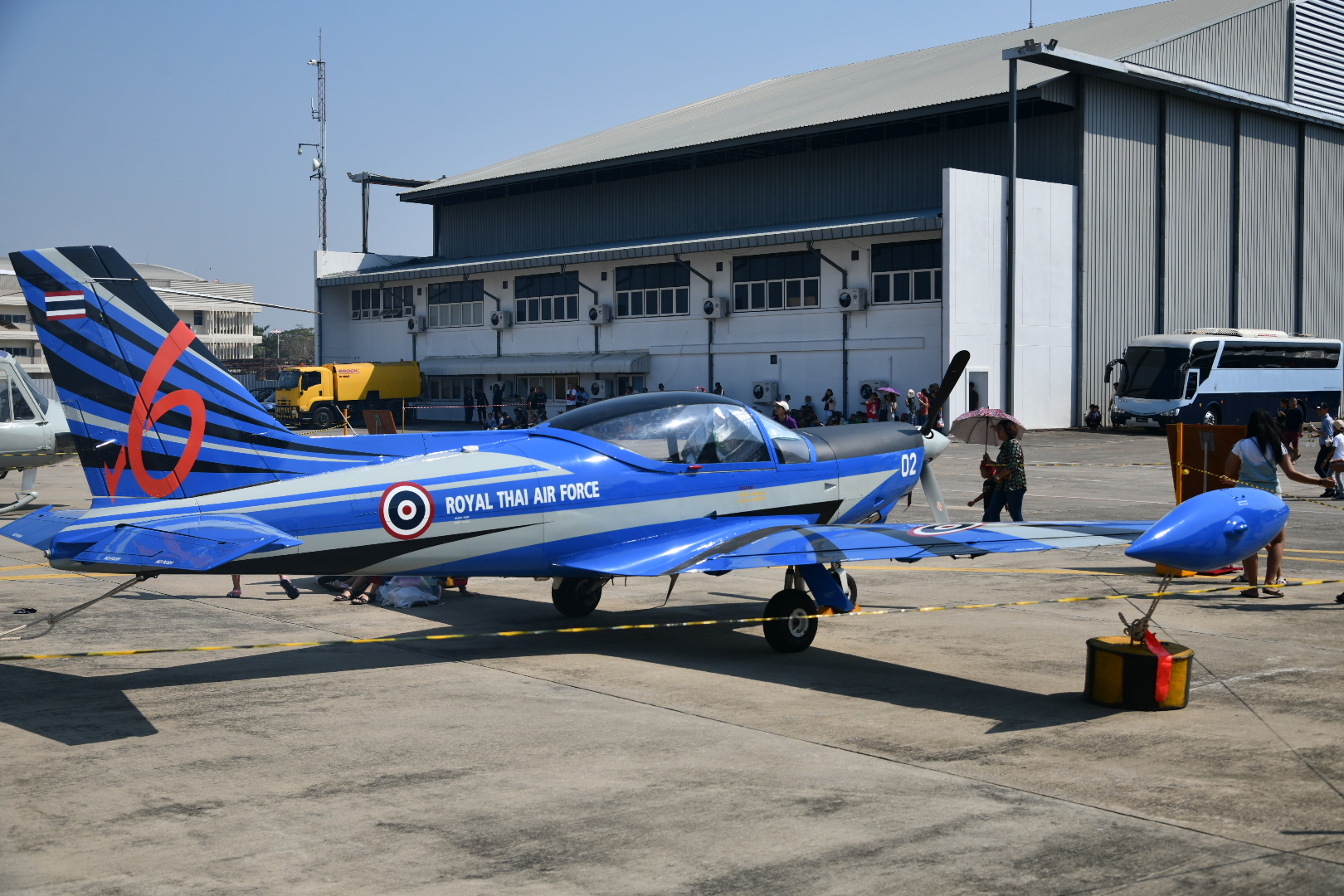

General information
- Type: Trainer aircraft
- National origin: Thailand
- Manufacturer: Thai Aviation Industry
- Status: In service, in production
- Primary user: Royal Thai Air Force
- Number built: 3 (2017), 25 reported built

History
- Manufactured: 2014–present
- Introduction date: 2014
- First flight: 14 June 2012
- Developed from: SIAI-Marchetti SF.260

The RTAF-6, officially designated B.ThO.6 (Thai: บ.ทอ.๖), is a Thai training aircraft developed from the Italian SIAI-Marchetti SF.260MT trainer, and built by Thai Aviation Industry.

== Specifications ==
Data from Air International February 2014

General characteristics

- Crew: One
- Length: 8.35 m (27.39 ft)
- Wingspan: 24.28 m (79 ft 8 in)
- Height: 2.4 m (7.9 ft)
- Powerplant: 1 × Allison 250-B17-D turboprop, 313 kW (420 hp)

Performance

- Maximum speed: 593 km/h (368 mph, 320 kn)
- Cruise speed: 414 km/h (257 mph, 224 kn) (econ cruise)
- Range: 668 km (415 mi, 361 nmi)
- Service ceiling: 7,600 m (25,000 ft)

Armament

- Hardpoints: 4 with a capacity of up to 68 kg (150 lb) on inner, 100 lb (45 kg) on outer

== Operators ==
Thailand

- Royal Thai Air Force

== See also ==
Related development

- SIAI-Marchetti SF.260
- RTAF-5

Aircraft of comparable role, configuration, and era

- Pilatus PC-9
