= AGO C.III =

German reconnaissance biplane

C.III
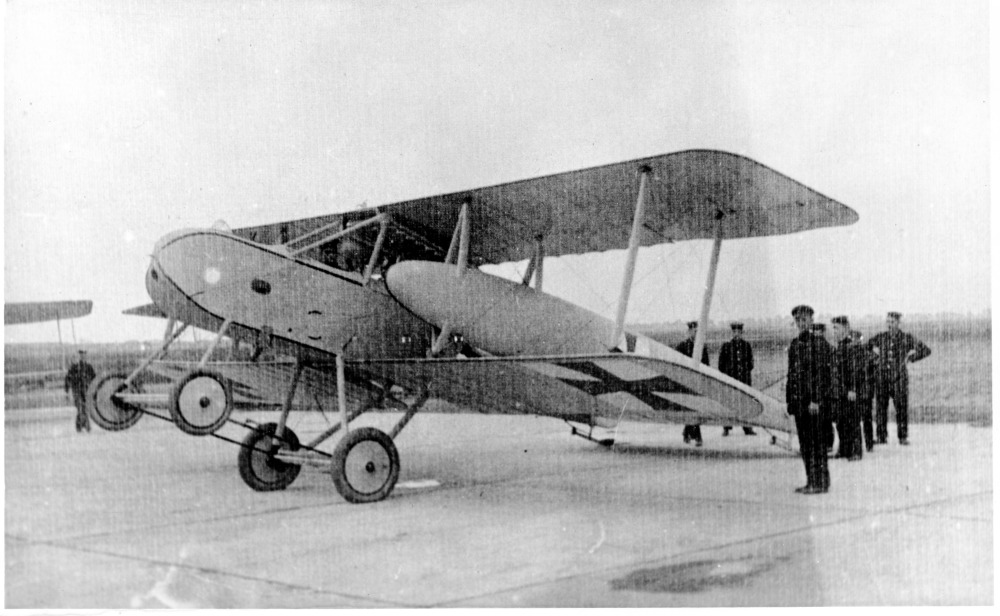

General information
- Type: Reconnaissance
- Manufacturer: AGO Flugzeugwerke
- Designer: A. Haefeli
- Primary user: Germany

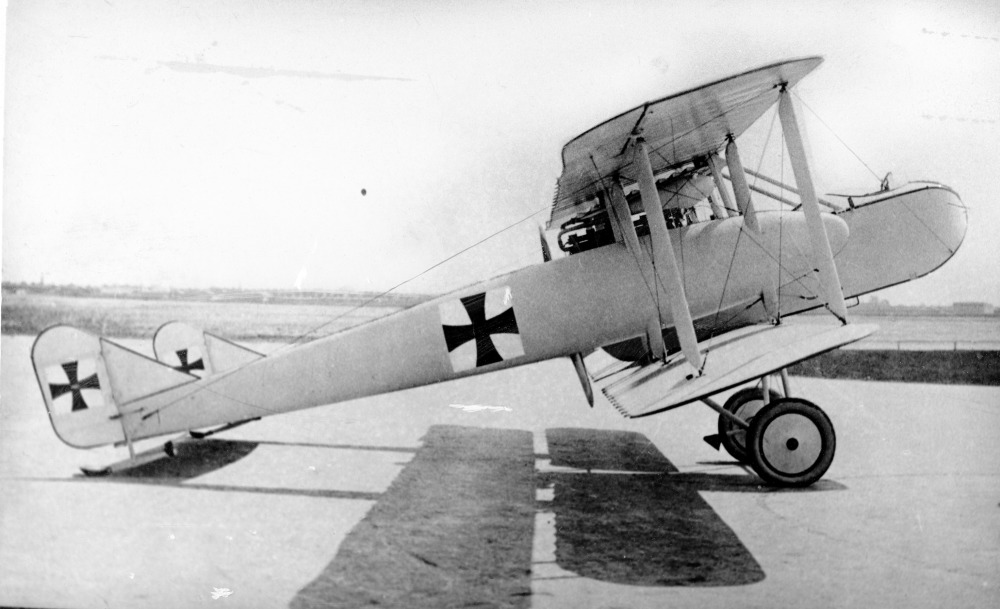
AGO C.III second version

The AGO C.III was a German reconnaissance biplane of World War I. It was a single experimental prototype derived from the manufacturer's C.I design.

== Specifications ==
General characteristics

- Crew: two, pilot and observer
- Length: 7.0 m (23 ft 0 in)
- Wingspan: 11.0 m (36 ft 1 in)
- Powerplant: 1 × Mercedes D.III , 117 kW (158 hp)

Performance

- Maximum speed: 145 km/h (90 mph, 78 kn)

Armament

- 1 × 7.92 mm Parabellum machine gun
