= Delta 8 =

Delta 8 may refer to:

- Delta-8-Tetrahydrocannabinol, a cannabinoid.
- Space Delta 8, a United States Space Force unit.
- Willoughby Delta 8, an experimental aircraft
