= Thai Aviation Industries =

Thai Aviation Industry
- Native name: บริษัท อุตสาหกรรมการบินไทย
- Industry: Aviation
- Founded: 23 September 2003; 22 years ago
- Headquarters: Bangkok, Thailand
- Products: Military aircraft

Thai Aviation Industries (TAI) (Thai ไทย: บริษัท อุตสาหกรรมการบินไทย) is Thailand's aircraft repair and maintenance service center. The Thai government approved the establishment of TAI on 23 September 2003, by the Royal Thai Air Force. TAI's headquarters is at Don Muang. TAI started its operation on 29 January 2004.

== History ==
TAI was established in 2003 in anticipation of the increasing opportunity in aviation maintenance service, driven by the surge of aviation activities resulting from the government's policy to make Thailand the aviation hub of the Asia Pacific region. Thailand had no aviation maintenance center before the company was established. The company serves the industry with more than 400 experienced engineers and aviation technicians from the Royal Thai Air Force.

On 23 September 2003, the Thai cabinet approved the project for the Transportation Ministry and Royal Thai Air Force (RTAF) to jointly establish the Thai Aviation Industries Company Limited (TAI) with registered capital of 100 million baht. The two major founding shareholders of TAI are the Office of Small and Medium Enterprises Promotion (OSMEP), 51 percent, and RTAF welfare, 49 percent.

Thai Aviation Industries Co., Ltd's headquarters at Don Muang started operation on 29 January 2004. The company's service center at Nakhon Sawan Province officially opened on 29 April 2004. The service standard follows the rules of the Department of Civil Aviation. One year later, the company expanded its services to two new maintenance services centers for light planes and aircraft for flight training at the Flying Training School (Nakhon Pathom Province) and Flight 604, Don Muang. The company also set up a tool and measurement testing and calibration center in 2005.

In 2006, TAI opened its Piston Engine Repairing Division (Donmueang), Propeller Repairing Division (DomMueang) and Aviation Electronics Repairing Division (Donnmueang). At the end of the year, the Helicopter Repair Center at Lopburi Province opened.

== Thai Aviation Industry aircraft ==
- RTAF-5
- RTAF-6
