= Aviméta 121 =

Prototype French bomber aircraft of 1928

General information
- Type: Bomber
- National origin: France
- Manufacturer: Aviméta
- Number built: 1

History
- First flight: 1928

The Aviméta 121 (sometimes referred to with the ambiguous designation Aviméta 21) was a prototype French bomber aircraft flown in 1928. It was built to a 1926 French Army requirement for a new Multiplace de Combat ("multi-seat combat") aircraft for bombing and reconnaissance. The Aviméta 121 was not selected for production, and only a single prototype was built. A proposed torpedo bomber seaplane version remained unrealised.

== Design ==
The Aviméta 121 was a shoulder-wing, strut-braced monoplane of conventional layout. Power was supplied by two W12 piston engines mounted in nacelles on the leading edge of the wings. These drove four-bladed tractor propellers. The main units of the fixed, tailskid undercarriage were enclosed in large aerodynamic sponsons. The pilot sat in an open cockpit, but the bombardier had an enclosed position in the nose. Defensive armament included two open machine-gun positions, one in the nose, and the other behind the cockpit.

Unusually for the time, construction was of metal throughout, more specifically, a special alloy developed by Aviméta and branded Alférium.

== Development ==
In 1926, the French Army issued a specification for a new Multiplace de Combat ("multi-seat combat") aircraft for bombing and reconnaissance. Several French manufacturers responded with designs including the Amiot 140, Aviméta 120, Blériot 137, Breguet 410, Dyle et Bacalan 20, Nieuport-Delage NiD.53, and SPCA 30, and the Army ordered prototypes of several of these. The Aviméta 120 was designed to be powered by Gnome-Rhône Jupiter radial engines, but the prototype ordered in 1927 as the Aviméta 121 was powered by the Lorraine 12Eb W-12 engine instead.

The prototype flew in 1928, first piloted by Adjutant Louis Moutonnier. The Aviméta 121 was found to be too heavy and unmaneuverable, and the Amiot 140 was ordered for production instead (as the Amiot 143). Losing this contract was part of the reason Aviméta withdrew from aircraft manufacturing.

A seaplane version was proposed as a torpedo bomber, and although one pontoon was constructed, this project went no further.

== Variants ==
Aviméta 120
Original design with radial engines (not built)
Aviméta 121
Prototype with W engines (1 built)
Seaplane version (proposed but not built)

== Specifications (Aviméta 121 prototype) ==
Data from Liron 1992, p.37

General characteristics

- Crew: 3
- Wingspan: 21.80 m (71 ft 6 in)
- Wing area: 70 m^{2} (750 sq ft)
- Empty weight: 2,400 kg (5,291 lb)
- Gross weight: 3,700 kg (8,157 lb)
- Powerplant: 2 × Lorraine 12Eb liquid-cooled, 12-cylinder, W engine, 336 kW (451 hp) each

Performance

- Maximum speed: 200 km/h (120 mph, 110 kn)
- Service ceiling: 5,500 m (18,000 ft)

== Notes ==
=== Bibliography ===
- Bondoux, Georges (February 2007). "Schneider et compagnie: Constructeur aéronautique" [Schneider & Co.: Aeronautical builder]. Bulletin de l'académie François Bourdon [Bulletin of the François Bourdon Academy] (in French). No. 8. Le Creusot: L'académie François Bourdon. pp. 22–28.
- Claveau, Charles (March–April 1991). "Les Constructeurs Français 1919–1945 (10)" [French builders 1919–1945 (10)]. Le Trait d'Union [The Link] (in French). No. 136. Paris: La Branche Français d'Air Britain. pp. 39–48.
- Liron, Jean (n.d.). "Les muliplaces de combat Schneider et Aviméta" [Muliplace combat aircraft of Schneider and Aviméta] (Document). unpublished essay. quoted in "Les Constructeurs Français 1919–1945: Additions et Corrections I" [French builders 1919–1945: Additions et Corrections I]. Le Trait d'Union [The Link]. No. 144. Paris: La Branche Français d'Air Britain. July–August 1992. p. 37.
- Liron, Jean; Borget, Michel; Bénichou, Michel (February 2000). "Quand le Groupe Schneider fasait de l'Aviation de Guerre" [When the Schneider Group was involved in military aviation]. Le Fana de l'Aviation [Aviation Fanatic] (in French). No. 363. Le Creusot: Editions Lariviere. pp. 14–27.
- The Illustrated Encyclopedia of Aircraft. London: Aerospace Publishing.
- Passaqui, Jean-Philippe (2020). "Schneider, les alliages légers et l'aviation (1916-1939)" [Schneider, Light Alloys and Aviation (1916-1939)]. E-Phaïstos: Revue d'histoire des techniques [e-Phaïstos: Journal of the history of technology] (in French). 8 (2). OpenEdition Journals.
