= Akaflieg Stuttgart fs28 =

fs28 Avispa

General information
- Type: Two seat light aircraft
- National origin: West Germany
- Designer: Akaflieg Stuttgart
- Number built: 1

History
- First flight: 20 December 1972

The Akaflieg Stuttgart fs28, nicknamed Avispa (Spanish: Wasp) is a single engine, twin boom pusher configuration light sports and utility aircraft designed at the University of Stuttgart in West Germany in the 1970s. Unusually, it has an inverted V-tail. The sole example remained active as of 2010.

== Design and development ==
The Akaflieg Stuttgart or Akademische Fliegergruppe Stuttgart (English: The Stuttgart Academic Flying Group) is one of some fourteen German student flying groups attached to and supported by their home Technical University. Several have designed and built aircraft, often technically advanced and leading the development of gliders in particular. The fs28 was their first powered aircraft. The project, supported by the Fraunhofer Society and the Ministry of Economics of Baden-Württemberg, was intended to transfer the knowledge about high performance aerodynamics and composite materials gained from glider design to light powered aircraft.

The fs28 is a twin-boom, pusher configuration low mid-wing monoplane. The wing has an Eppler profile, quite new in the 1970s, and is straight tapered with a swept leading edge and unswept trailing edge, resulting in 6.75° sweep at quarter chord. It is constructed from a sandwich of glass fibre and rigid foam and has 4.5° of dihedral. Fowler flaps, in two sections separated by the tail booms, fill the trailing edge out to the plain, untabbed ailerons. Accommodation and engine are in a central nacelle of glass reinforced plastic/honeycomb sandwich. Side-by-side seating is enclosed under a generous, three section canopy entered via upward, centreline hinged doors. A 115 hp (86 kW) flat four Lycoming O-235 piston engine, mounted in the rear of the nacelle with its output shaft well above the wing and booms and air-cooled via a semi-annular intake behind the cabin, drove a three-blade pusher propeller with a large spinner, designed to minimise noise. The three blade propeller was later replaced by a two-blade one.

The tail booms are slender and linked at the rear by the unusual inverted Vee empennage. The straight edged, fixed rear surfaces are constructed as the wing but the control surfaces are fabric covered, with spring tabs. The fs28 has a retractable tricycle undercarriage with glass fibre shock absorbers, mainwheel hydraulic brakes and a steerable nosewheel.

The sole fs28, V-1, D-EAFS, made its first flight on 20 December 1972.

== Operational history ==
The fs28 was seriously damaged in an accident in May 1981 and its permit to fly (PTF) lapsed that November. With no rebuild under way, the registration D-EAFS was reallocated to another type in 1990. However, V-1 was rebuilt, regaining its PTF in July 1997, when it was registered as D-EKFS. It was on the German civil aircraft register in 2010, remaining active.

== Specifications ==
Data from Jane's All the World's Aircraft 1974-75. All performance figures are at the maximum take-off weight.

General characteristics

- Crew: Two
- Length: 7.20 m (23 ft 7 in)
- Wingspan: 9.40 m (30 ft 10 in)
- Aspect ratio: 7
- Airfoil: Eppler 530
- Empty weight: 640 kg (1,411 lb)
- Max takeoff weight: 950 kg (2,094 lb)
- Fuel capacity: 115 L (25.3 I,p gal; 30.4 US gal)
- Powerplant: 1 × Lycoming O-235-E2A air-cooled flat four, 86 kW (115 hp)
- Propellers: 3-bladed Hoffmann variable pitch pusher.

Performance

- Maximum speed: 270 km/h (170 mph, 150 kn)
- Cruise speed: 250 km/h (160 mph, 130 kn) at 75% power
- Never exceed speed: 338 km/h (210 mph, 183 kn)
- Range: 1,000 km (620 mi, 540 nmi) at least, with 30 min reserve
- Wing loading: 71 kg/m^{2} (15 lb/sq ft)
- Landing speed: 85 km/h (53 mph; 46 kn)
