= AGO Ao 192 =

Airliner by AGO

Ao 192 Kurier
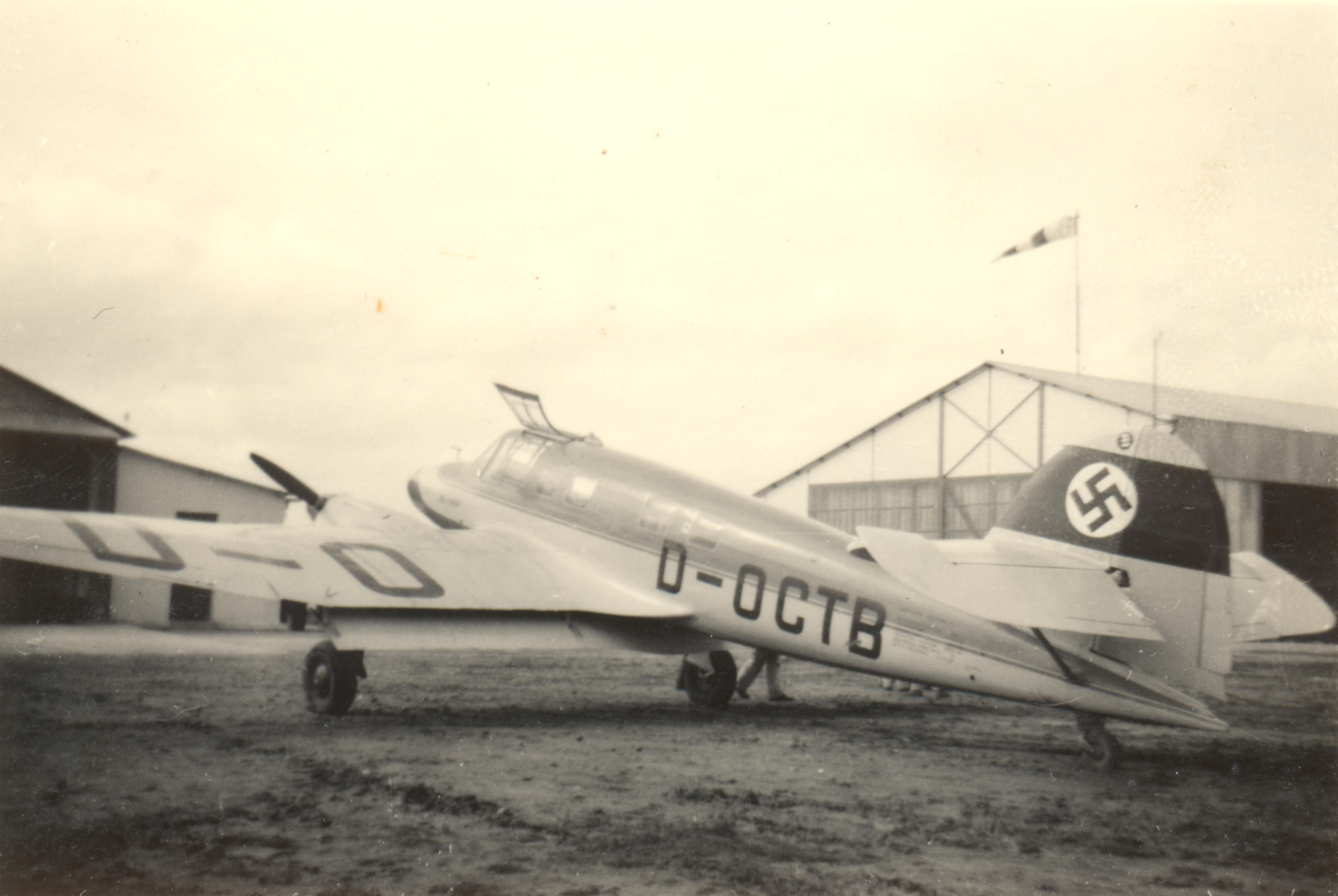
- D-OCTB in Tunisia, 1939

General information
- Type: Light transport/utility aircraft
- National origin: Germany
- Manufacturer: AGO Flugzeugwerke
- Number built: 9

History
- First flight: 1935

The Ago Ao 192 Kurier (Courier) was a small German twin-engined aircraft designed and built by AGO Flugzeugwerke in the 1930s. A small production run of six aircraft followed three prototypes, these being used as transports.

== Development and design ==
The AGO Flugzeugwerke was re-established at Oschersleben in 1934, with its first design a multi-purpose light-twin-engined aircraft offered against the same requirement for a light aircraft that produced the Gotha Go 146 and Siebel Fh 104.

AGO's design, the Ao 192, was a low-winged cantilever monoplane of all-metal construction. Its monocoque fuselage accommodated a crew of two pilots who sat side by side in an enclosed flight deck, while there were seats for five passengers in a separate cabin. It was powered by two 179 kW (240 hp) Argus As 10 and had a retractable tailwheel undercarriage.

The first prototype made its maiden flight in mid-1935, soon being followed by a second aircraft, similar to the first. A third prototype, with a deeper fuselage allowing an additional passenger to be carried, more powerful engines and a revised undercarriage, formed the basis for the planned Ao 192B civil transport, with versions planned to serve as light transports, ambulance aircraft and survey aircraft. In addition, a number of military variants were proposed, including a light reconnaissance aircraft and a light bomber.

AGO had large orders for licence-built aircraft for the Luftwaffe however, with much of their wartime work involved with Focke-Wulf, and only six AGO production aircraft could be built.

== Operational history ==
The six production aircraft were acquired by the German state, with one being used as the personal transport of Dr Robert Ley, the head of the Reichsarbeitdienst (RAD/Reich Labour Service), while others were used as transports by the Waffen-SS and at the Luftwaffe test-centre at Rechlin.

== Variants ==
Ao 192V1
First prototype. Argus As 10 C engines.
Ao 192V2
Second prototype, revised, braced, tailplane.
Ao 192V3
Third prototype. Argus As 10E engines, revised fuselage and undercarriage.
Ao 192B
Production series based on V3. Six built.

== Specifications (Ao 192B) ==
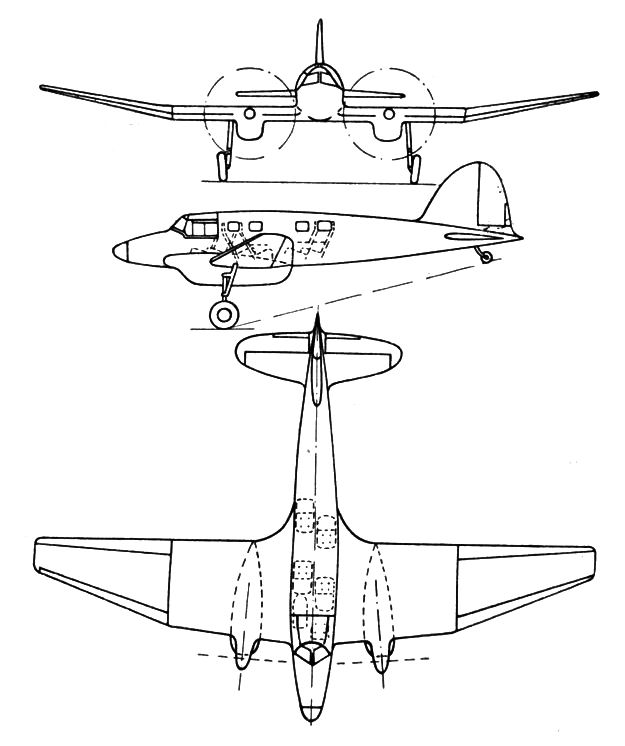
Ago 192 3-view drawing from L'Aerophile April 1937

Data from Air International June 1977, Flugzeug-Typenbuch 1941

General characteristics

- Crew: 1 pilot + 1 radio operator
- Capacity: 6 passengers
- Length: 10.98 m (36 ft 0 in)
- Wingspan: 13.54 m (44 ft 5 in)
- Height: 3.64 m (11 ft 11 in)
- Wing area: 25.04 m^{2} (269.5 sq ft)
- Empty weight: 1,640 kg (3,616 lb)
- Gross weight: 2,860 kg (6,305 lb)
- Max takeoff weight: 2,950 kg (6,504 lb)
- Fuel capacity: main tank:410 L (110 US gal; 90 imp gal); oil tank:38 L (10 US gal; 8.4 imp gal)
- Powerplant: 2 × Argus As 10E air-cooled inverted V-8 engine, 200 kW (270 hp) each
- Propellers: 2-bladed variable-pitch wooden propellers, 2.3 m (7 ft 7 in) diameter

Performance

- Maximum speed: 335 km/h (208 mph, 181 kn) at 2,000 m (6,600 ft)
- Cruise speed: 238 km/h (148 mph, 129 kn) at 2,000 m (6,600 ft)
- Landing Speed: 90 km/h (56 mph; 49 kn)
- Range: 1,360 km (850 mi, 730 nmi)
- Endurance: 3.86 hours
- Service ceiling: 5,200 m (17,100 ft) on 2 engines; 1,500 m (4,900 ft) on 1 engine
- Time to altitude: 1,000 m (3,300 ft) in 3.2 minutes; 2,000 m (6,600 ft) in 7.2 minutes; 4,000 m (13,000 ft) in 20 minutes
- Wing loading: 114.05 kg/m^{2} (23.36 lb/sq ft)
- Power/mass: 5.3 kg/hp
- Landing run: 275 m (902 ft)
- Take-off run: 235 m (771 ft)

== See also ==
Aircraft of comparable role, configuration, and era

- Siebel Fh 104
- Gotha Go 146

Related lists

- List of Interwar military aircraft
