= Pocino PJ.1A =

Single-engined pusher aircraft

PJ.1A Toucan

General information
- Type: Single seat sports aircraft
- National origin: France
- Designer: José Pocino
- Number built: 1

History
- First flight: 6 November 1989

The Pocino PJ.1A Toucan is a French, single seat, twin boom light aircraft of pusher configuration which first flew in 1989. The single example remained active until at least 2007.

== Design and development ==
José Pocino's Toucan has a pod style fuselage with the pilot enclosed under a single piece canopy that continues the fuselage profile. The pilot's seat is ahead of the wing leading edge, with the pusher engine behind it. For its first flight the Toucan was powered by a Hirth two cylinder, two stroke engine, completely enclosed within the fuselage but this was soon replaced by a 38 kW (51 hp) Rotax 503.2V engine of similar configuration, driving a three rather than two-bladed propeller. The engine change led to a slightly revised engine cowling and a decreased area of the cockpit transparency. A fixed tricycle undercarriage is mounted on the fuselage. Initially the main wheel legs were braced but have been replaced with cantilevers.

The Toucan's wing is straight edged, of constant chord and square tipped, set low on the fuselage. There is some dihedral outboard of a brief centre section. From the wing roots two slender beams extend rearwards to cropped triangular fins, linked by a straight edged tailplane at about one third fin height. The unbalanced rudders are rectangular.

The Toucan first flew on 6 November 1989, powered by the Hirth engine, and received its Certificate of Airworthiness on 9 December 1991. It flew at the RSA rallies in 2006 and 2007 and remains on the French Civil Aircraft Register in 2014.

== Specifications ==
Data from Gaillard (1991), p.248

General characteristics

- Crew: One
- Length: 5.90 m (19 ft 4 in)
- Wingspan: 7.50 m (24 ft 7 in)
- Wing area: 7 m^{2} (75 sq ft)
- Empty weight: 184 kg (406 lb)
- Gross weight: 270 kg (595 lb)
- Powerplant: 1 × Hirth F-series initially, Rotax 503.2V later. Air-cooled, two cylinder inline two strokes, 38 kW (51 hp) Rotax
- Propellers: 2 (Hirth) or 3 (Rotax)-bladed

Performance

- Cruise speed: 140 km/h (87 mph, 76 kn)
