= Henderson H.S.F.1 =

British light aircraft

H.S.F.1

General information
- Type: Six-seat monoplane
- National origin: United Kingdom
- Manufacturer: Henderson School of Flying Limited
- Designer: J. Bewsher
- Number built: 1

History
- First flight: 1929
- Retired: 1930

The Henderson H.S.F.1 was a British six-seat low-wing monoplane designed by J. Bewsher and built by the Henderson School of Flying. Only one aircraft was built and it was scrapped in 1930 following the death of the owner George Lockhart Piercy Henderson.

== Design and development ==
The H.S.F.1 (Note: Described as the H.F.S.1 on the registration entry held by the Civil Aviation Authority) was a twin-boom pusher monoplane powered by a 240 hp (179 kW) Siddeley Puma engine. Designed by J. Bewsher it was built in a shed at Byfleet in Surrey and assembled at Brooklands Aerodrome by the Henderson School of Flying in 1928. Originally built with an enclosing cabin top; this was removed and it flew its first flight at Brooklands by Henderson with an open cockpit. The aircraft carried 30 passengers in total on its first day.

In April 1930 it was tested by the Air Ministry at Martlesham Heath. Henderson died in July 1930 in the crash of a Junkers F.13 at Meopham following which the H.S.F.1 was scrapped.

== Specifications ==
Data from Jackson

General characteristics

- Crew: 1
- Capacity: 5
- Length: 38 ft 0 in (11.58 m)
- Wingspan: 51 ft 0 in (15.54 m)
- Empty weight: 3,300 lb (1,497 kg)
- Gross weight: 4,112 lb (1,865 kg)
- Powerplant: 1 × Siddeley Puma , 240 hp (180 kW)

Performance

- Maximum speed: 105 mph (169 km/h, 91 kn)
- Range: 350 mi (560 km, 300 nmi)

== See also ==
- Surrey Flying Services AL.1 – a biplane designed by Bewsher
