= AGO Flugzeugwerke =

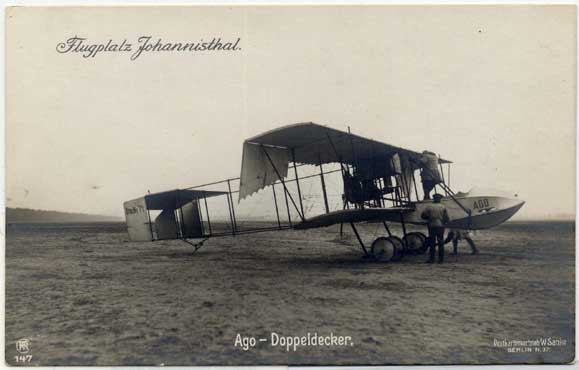
An AGO 1914 airplane in the Johannisthal aerodrome

AGO Flugzeugwerke was a German aircraft manufacturing company from 1911 until 1945. The initials AGO had a variety of meanings (such as Aktiengesellschaft Otto) during the company's lifetime, but in its final version stood for Apparatebau GmbH Oschersleben. At its peak, the company employed around 4,500 people.

== Foundation ==
AGO was founded in 1911 in Munich as Flugmaschinenwerke Gustav Otto by Gustav Otto and a Dr Herbert Alberti. Gustav, the son of Nicolaus Otto – inventor of the four-stroke engine, was a pioneer aviator (pilot's licence No. 34) and engine-builder. As was usual in those days, a flying school was attached to the business – one of its later students was Ernst Udet.

The company's first successful aircraft under head designer, Gabriel Letsch, was an observation biplane with a pusher propeller that soon became the standard equipment of the Bayerischen Fliegertruppe. The machine was powered by a 75 kW (100 hp) engine of the firm's own design, branded Aviatiker Gustav Otto.

In 1912, a separate division was set up in Johannisthal under the name Ago Flugzeugwerke, with Elisabeth Woerner and Hermann Fremery as directors. After the outbreak of World War I, AGO built a series of military reconnaissance aircraft, beginning with the AGO C.I – a pusher-powered biplane designed by August Haefeli. The most successful of AGO's wartime aircraft was the C.IV of 1916, of which 70 examples were built.

In 1916, Gustav Otto opened a new plant in Munich under the name Bayerische Flugzeugwerke, and another in Oschersleben (with Josef Schnittisser) again named AGO, this time for Aktiengesellschaft Gustav Otto. The Oschersleben plant was used to manufacture components for other manufacturers' aircraft until the end of the war.

== Between the Wars ==
After the Armistice, Otto tried automobile manufacturing, but in 1919 had to dismiss the employees of the Berlin company and divest himself of the Oschersleben factory. He himself withdrew to Lake Starnberg where he died in 1926. The company continued, and in the same year developed 20 new hectares of factory space near the Sudenburger Maschinenfabrik und Eisengießerei AG plant at Magdeburg. By 1928 this enterprise was also forced to close. On 30 July 1930, AGO's remaining assets were sold at auction by order of the court.

== 1933 – 1945 ==
The Nazi government resurrected AGO by refurbishing the Oschersleben plant for aircraft production once more. The first order was for 36 Arado Ar 65 fighters, 197 Arado Ar 66 trainers, and 71 Heinkel He 51 fighters. The first of these to fly was an Ar 65s, on 1 May 1935. This was followed by an order for 140 Henschel Hs 123 dive-bombers delivered at the end of 1937, AGO's introduction to all-metal construction. Next came orders for 241 Gotha Go 145 trainers and 187 Arado Ar 96, and then 150 Henschel Hs 126 reconnaissance aircraft. This latter order was increased to 390 units in Summer 1938. Between March 1937 and March 1938, AGO built 121 Focke-Wulf Fw 44. In 1938, production of the Messerschmitt Bf 109 began, and from 1941 onwards, the Focke-Wulf Fw 190 became the mainstay of AGO's production.

In 1935, the design department was re-established, with the first new AGO aircraft becoming the AGO Ao 192 Kurier of 1937. A design for a heavy fighter project, the Ao 225 did not progress past the wind-tunnel stage and even the 8−225 RLM airframe designator for the type was withdrawn by the RLM and reassigned to Focke-Achgelis.

From 1943 onwards, due to its key role in producing the Fw 190 the AGO factory came under attack by Allied bombing raids, suffering increasingly heavy damage up to the end of the war. In 1947, the last remains of the factory were blown up by the Red Army.

== Aircraft ==
=== Otto ===
(Gustav Otto / Flugmaschinenwerke Gustav Otto/ Aviatiker Gustav Otto)

- Otto 1913 pusher biplane
- Otto B 1914
- Otto B.I
- Otto C.I 1915
- Otto C.II

=== AGO Flugzeugwerke ===
(1912 onwards at Johannistal)

- AGO C.I
- AGO C.II
- AGO C.III
- AGO C.IV
- AGO C.VII
- AGO C.VIII
- AGO DV.3
- AGO S.I
- AGO Ao 192
- AGO Ao 225

== See also ==
- Volksflugzeug
