= Lloyd 40.08 Luftkreuzer =

World War I triplane bomber

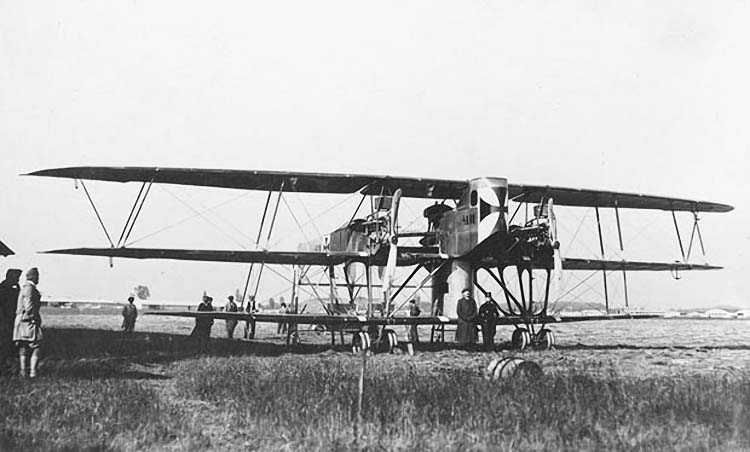
- The Lloyd 40.08 Luftkreuzer during trials at Aszód.

General information
- Type: Bomber
- National origin: Austria-Hungary
- Manufacturer: Ungarische Lloyd Flugzeug und Motorenfabrik AG
- Number built: 1

History
- First flight: October 1916

The Lloyd 40.08 Luftkreuzer (Sky Cruiser) was a three engine triplane bomber type built during World War I. The design was proven to be ineffective and development did not proceed past the prototype stage.

== Design and development ==
In August 1915, the Austro-Hungarian Imperial and Royal Aviation Troops (Luftfahrttruppen) awarded funding to Lloyd for construction of a new heavy bomber that could carry a 200 kg (440 lb) bomb-load and have endurance of at least 6 hours. The aircraft was to be powered by one powerful engine in a pusher configuration housed in a central nacelle and two smaller engines mounted in twin booms on either side. In January 1916, Lloyd received specifications and drawings for a large triplane that was to be known as the Luftkreuzer.

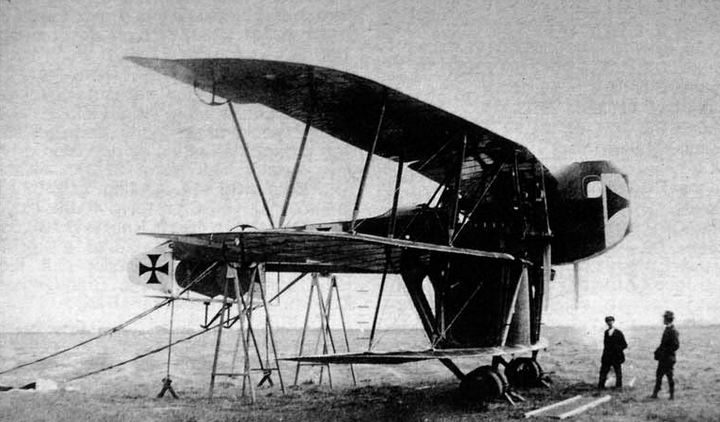
Engine testing in June 1916.

The unequal span triplane had the middle wing mounted to the lower part of the main fuselage and booms, with the upper and lower wings supported by wire braced inter-plane struts. The centre section housed a 220 kW (300 hp) Austro-Daimler V-12 water-cooled engine, driving a wooden two-bladed pusher propeller. The twin booms were constructed of modified Lloyd C.II fuselages with 120 kW (160 hp) Austro-Daimler 6 water-cooled in-line engines, and two bladed wooden propellers. Directly below the main section between the middle and lower wings, was a fully enclosed compartment with windows for the bombardier. The most forward section between the middle and upper wings also had windows and enough space for two air gunners with excellent fields of fire in all directions and was also equipped with a spotlight. The pilots position was set in the rear of the centre fuselage close to the pusher propeller and had very poor forward visibility. Defensive armament consisted of two Schwarzlose M7/12 machine guns in the gunners station and one in each boom.

Testing of the 40.08 Luftkreuzer began on 8 June 1916 at the airport in Aszód. It was immediately clear that the machine suffered from a centre of gravity that was too high and too far forward. The aircraft was damaged when it nosed over during ground testing and was redesigned with a third wheel under the nose, similar to the Zeppelin-Staaken R.XIV, to prevent tipping forward. In October 1916 Oberleutnant Antal Lany-Lanczendorfer attempted the first flight but the aircraft was unable to leave the ground. Early in November the Fliegerarsenal (FlArs) considered reducing the bomb load, and in December additional chassis rails were added to the main undercarriage. Development continued slowly but many of the design flaws would never be solved. Lloyd applied for a revision of the airplane in March 1917, but the application was denied and all work halted. The Luftkreuzer was placed in storage and on 17 January 1918 it was ordered to be transported to Fliegermaterial-Depot IV at Eger, for disposal.

== Specifications ==
Data from Austro-Hungarian Army Aircraft of World War One

General characteristics

- Crew: 4-5
- Length: 9.55 m (31 ft 4 in)
- Upper wingspan: 23.26 m (76 ft 4 in)
- Mid wingspan: 22.38 m (73 ft 5 in)
- Lower wingspan: 16.84 m (55 ft 3 in)
- Height: 5.01 m (16 ft 5 in)
- Wing area: 110.0 m^{2} (1,184 sq ft)
- Gross weight: 4,840 kg (10,670 lb)
- Max takeoff weight: 4,840 kg (10,670 lb)
- Powerplant: 1 × Austro-Daimler V-12 V-12 water-cooled piston engine, 224 kW (300 hp) mounted as a pusher in the central nacelle
- Powerplant: 2 × Austro-Daimler 6 6-cylinder water-cooled in-line piston engine, 120 kW (160 hp) each mounted as tractors in the side fuselages
- Propellers: 2-bladed fixed-pitch propellers

Performance Armament

- Guns: 4 x 7.92 mm (0.312 in) Schwarzlose M7/12 machine guns
- Bombs: 200 kg (440 lb)

== See also ==
- Gotha G.IV
