= Friedrichshafen FF.44 =

FF.44
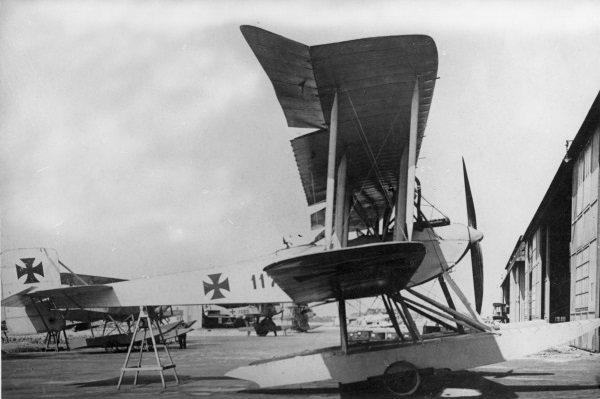

General information
- Type: Two-seat coastal patrol floatplane
- Manufacturer: Flugzeugbau Friedrichshafen
- Primary user: Imperial German Navy
- Number built: 1

History
- First flight: 1917
- Developed from: Friedrichshafen FF.34

The FF.44 was an experimental two-seat maritime reconnaissance floatplane built by Friedrichshafen Aircraft Construction Company (Flugzeugbau Friedrichshafen) for the Imperial German Navy's (Kaiserliche Marine) Naval Air Service (Marine-Fliegerabteilung) during the First World War. Completed in 1917, the aircraft was intended to evaluate the performance of its Maybach Mb.IV engine with a reduction gear in an aircraft in a tractor configuration. It did not meet expectations and the program was cancelled in early 1918.

== Design and development ==
The pusher configuration FF.34 was an earlier aircraft built to evaluate the engine in that type of aircraft in 1916, while the FF.40 used the engine mounted in the fuselage to drive two propellers mounted between the wings via driveshafts and bevel gears. The FF.44 retained the same serial number (Marine Nummer) and role as the FF.34, but sources differ about how much material from the older aircraft was used in the FF.44, if any. Aviation historian Jack Herris states that the wings and the engine were reused, but historian Siegfried Borzutzki says that the aircraft was an entirely new design.

The FF.44 was a two-bay biplane with staggered wings. The pilot's cockpit was forward of the observer's; there was a large semi-circular cutout in the upper wing to improve the pilot's view. The nose of the fuselage was streamlined to reduce drag, although the water-cooled 240-metric-horsepower (177 kW) Maybach Mb.IV straight-six engine protruded from the top of the nose. The engine drove a large two-bladed propeller fitted with a spinner through a reduction gear that reduced its speed, hopefully improving its efficiency. The radiator was suspended from the leading edge of the upper wing. The two floats were connected to the lower wing and the fuselage with a large number of struts. The aircraft's armament consisted of a 7.92-millimeter (0.312 in) Parabellum MG14 machine gun on a flexible mount for the observer. Unlike most Friedrichshafen designs, the FF.44 lacked a vertical stabilizer and used a balanced rudder.

The Navy's Seaplane Experimental Command (Seeflugzeug-Versuchs-Kommando (SVK)) returned the FF.34 to Friedrichshafen on 22 April 1916 for structural work (Note: Borzutzki states that the FF.44 made its first flight in April 1917, while Herris states that the FF.34 was still under repair until 4 May 1917.) and the FF.44 was delivered on 24 October 1917 to the SVK. The aircraft did not have the expected performance improvements and the program was cancelled on 31 March 1918.

== Specifications (FF.44) ==
Data from Flugzeugbau Friedrichshafen GmbH: Diplom-Ingenieur Theodor Kober

General characteristics

- Crew: 2
- Length: 10.85 m (35 ft 7 in)
- Upper wingspan: 18.4 m (60 ft 4 in)
- Lower wingspan: 16.8 m (55 ft 1 in)
- Height: 4.25 m (13 ft 11 in)
- Wing area: 68.5 m^{2} (737 sq ft)
- Empty weight: 1,552 kg (3,422 lb)
- Gross weight: 2,305 kg (5,082 lb)
- Powerplant: 1 × Maybach Mb.IV water-cooled straight-six engine, 180 kW (240 hp)
- Propellers: 2-bladed fixed-pitch

Performance

- Maximum speed: 145 km/h (90 mph, 78 kn)
- Range: 600 km (370 mi, 320 nmi)
- Time to altitude:

500 m (1,600 ft) in 6 minutes 48 seconds
1,000 m (3,300 ft) in 8 minutes 54 seconds
2,000 m (6,600 ft) in 22 minutes 6 seconds

Armament

- Guns: 1 × 7.92 mm (0.312 in) Parabellum MG14 machine gun for observer

== Bibliography ==
- Borzutzki, Siegfried (1993). Flugzeugbau Friedrichshafen GmbH: Diplom-Ingenieur Theodor Kober [Friedrichshafen Aircraft Company: Diploma-Engineer Theodore Kober] (in German). Burbach. ISBN 3-927513-60-1.
- Gray, Peter & Thetford, Owen (1987) [1970]. German Aircraft of the First World War (2nd ed.). Putnam. ISBN 0-85177-809-7.
- Herris, Jack (2016). Friedrichshafen Aircraft of WWI: A Centennial Perspective on Great War Airplanes. Great War Aviation Centennial Series. Vol. 21. Aeronaut Books. ISBN 978-1-935881-35-3.
- Nowarra, Heinz J.; Robertson, Bruce & Cooksley, Peter G. (1966). Marine Aircraft of the 1914–1918 War. Harleyford Publications. OCLC 123198808.
