= WLT Sparrow =

Sparrow ML

General information
- Type: Tandem seat ultralight
- National origin: Czech Republic
- Manufacturer: Wolfsberg Aircraft s.r.o.
- Designer: Alec N Clark
- Status: in production
- Number built: 13 by end-2017

History
- Introduction date: March 2013
- First flight: 24 August 2010

The Wolfsberg Aircraft Sparrow ML is a twin boom, pusher configuration ultralight aircraft seating two in tandem. Designed and built in the Czech Republic, originally by Wolfsberg Letecká Továrna (WLT) which was renamed Wolfberg Aircraft in 2017.

== Design and development ==
The Sparrow is largely built from carbon fibre. Its wing has a short span rectangular section between the tail-booms and straight-tapered outer panels with angled tips. There are short ailerons with flaps between them and the twin slender booms. Each boom carries an angled, straight edged fin and rudder; the tailplane, with a one-piece elevator fitted with an offset trim tab, is mounted on top of the fins.

The Sparrow's fuselage has a smooth profile partly defined by multipanel glazing that extends almost from the nose back beyond the wing leading edge. Access to both of the tandem seats is via a wide port-side door. The aircraft is normally flown from the front; the rear seat, placed over the leading edge, can also be provided with controls and instrumentation for an instructor (the Trainer version) or, as on the Clubman, be a passenger position. A ballistic recovery parachute is an option. The Sparrow has a fixed tricycle undercarriage; all three wheels have speed fairings and the main wheels have faired legs under the wings, raked back from the forward ends of the booms.

The Sparrow first flew on 24 August 2010 and production started in 2012. It achieved Czech certification on 1 March 2013 and by the summer of that year six had been built. French certification was obtained in January 2014 and it appeared on public display for the first time at the AERO Friedrichshafen show in 2014. The display example is a later version powered by a 75 kW (100 hp) Rotax 912 ULS flat-four, air- and liquid-cooled engine.

== Variants ==
Sparrow ML Clubman
Controls and instruments for front seat only.
Sparrow ML Trainer
Dual controls and instruments. 12 kg (26 lb) heavier than the Clubman.

== Specifications (Rotax 912 UL engine) ==
Data from Wolfsberg Aircraft

General characteristics

- Crew: one pilot
- Capacity: one passenger
- Length: 7.00 m (23 ft 0 in)
- Wingspan: 9.1 m (29 ft 10 in)
- Height: 1.76 m (5 ft 9 in)
- Wing area: 11.6 m^{2} (125 sq ft)
- Empty weight: 272 kg (600 lb)
- Max takeoff weight: 472.5 kg (1,042 lb)
- Fuel capacity: 60 litres (13 imp gal; 16 US gal)
- Powerplant: 1 × Rotax 912 UL air and water-cooled horizontally opposed 4-cylinder in pusher configuration, 60 kW (80 hp)
- Propellers: 3-bladed Woodcomp Klassic 170/3, 1.70 m (5 ft 7 in) diameter composite, with ground adjustable pitch

Performance

- Cruise speed: 210 km/h (130 mph, 110 kn)
- Stall speed: 57 km/h (35 mph, 31 kn) flaps down
- Never exceed speed: 234 km/h (145 mph, 126 kn)
- Minimum control speed: 60 km/h (37 mph, 32 kn)
- Take-off distance to clear 15 m (50 ft): 210 m (689 ft)
- Landing distance from 15 m (50 ft): 210 m (689 ft)
