= AGO C.II =

German reconnaissance biplane

C.II
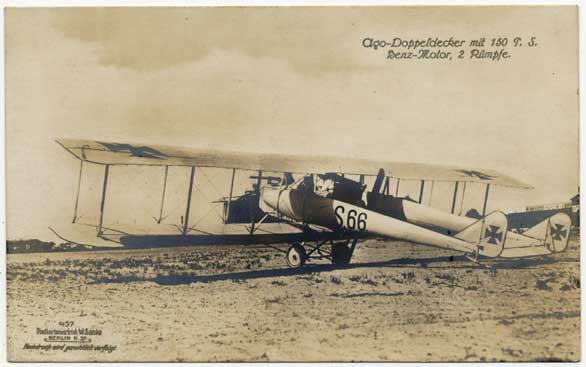
- An AGO C.II (3-bay wings)

General information
- Type: Reconnaissance
- Manufacturer: AGO Flugzeugwerke
- Designer: August Häfeli
- Primary user: Germany
- Number built: 15

History
- Introduction date: 1915

The AGO C.II was a German reconnaissance biplane of World War I. It was essentially a slightly redesigned version of the manufacturer's C.I design with a more powerful engine and 3-bay wings.

Two examples were equipped with floats (designation C.II-W) and operated by the Imperial German Navy for coastal patrol.

== Operators ==
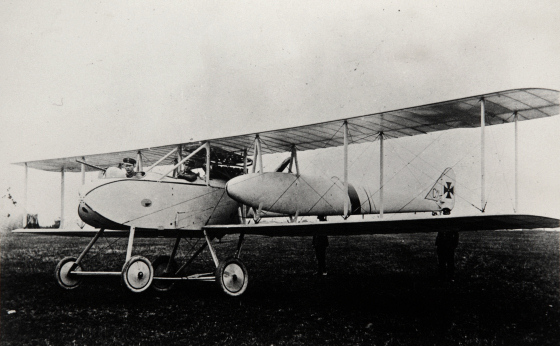
AGO C.II FQ

German Empire

- Luftstreitkräfte
- Kaiserliche Marine

== Specifications (AGO C.II (3-bay wings)) ==
Data from

General characteristics

- Crew: two, pilot and observer
- Length: 9.84 m (32 ft 3 in)
- Wingspan: 14.5 m (47 ft 7 in) ; 3-bay wings 18.3 m (60 ft)
- Height: 3.175 m (10 ft 5 in)
- Empty weight: 1,360 kg (2,998 lb)
- Gross weight: 1,946 kg (4,290 lb)
- Powerplant: 1 × Benz Bz.IV , 160 kW (220 hp)

Performance

- Maximum speed: 137 km/h (85 mph, 74 kn)
- Range: 580 km (360 mi, 310 nmi)
- Service ceiling: 4,500 m (14,800 ft)

Armament

- Guns: 1 × 7.92 mm (0.312 in) Parabellum machine gun

== See also ==
Aircraft of comparable role, configuration, and era

- Airco DH.7

== Bibliography ==
- Angelucci, Enzo (1983). Harris, S. M. (ed.). The Rand McNally encyclopedia of military aircraft 1914 - 1980. Translated by Harris, S. M. (Reprint ed.). New York: Military Press. ISBN 0-517-41021-4.
- Taylor, Michael J. H. (1989). Jane's Encyclopedia of Aviation. London: Studio Editions. p. 39.
