= Dyle et Bacalan DB-20 =

1920s French ground attack aircraft

DB-20
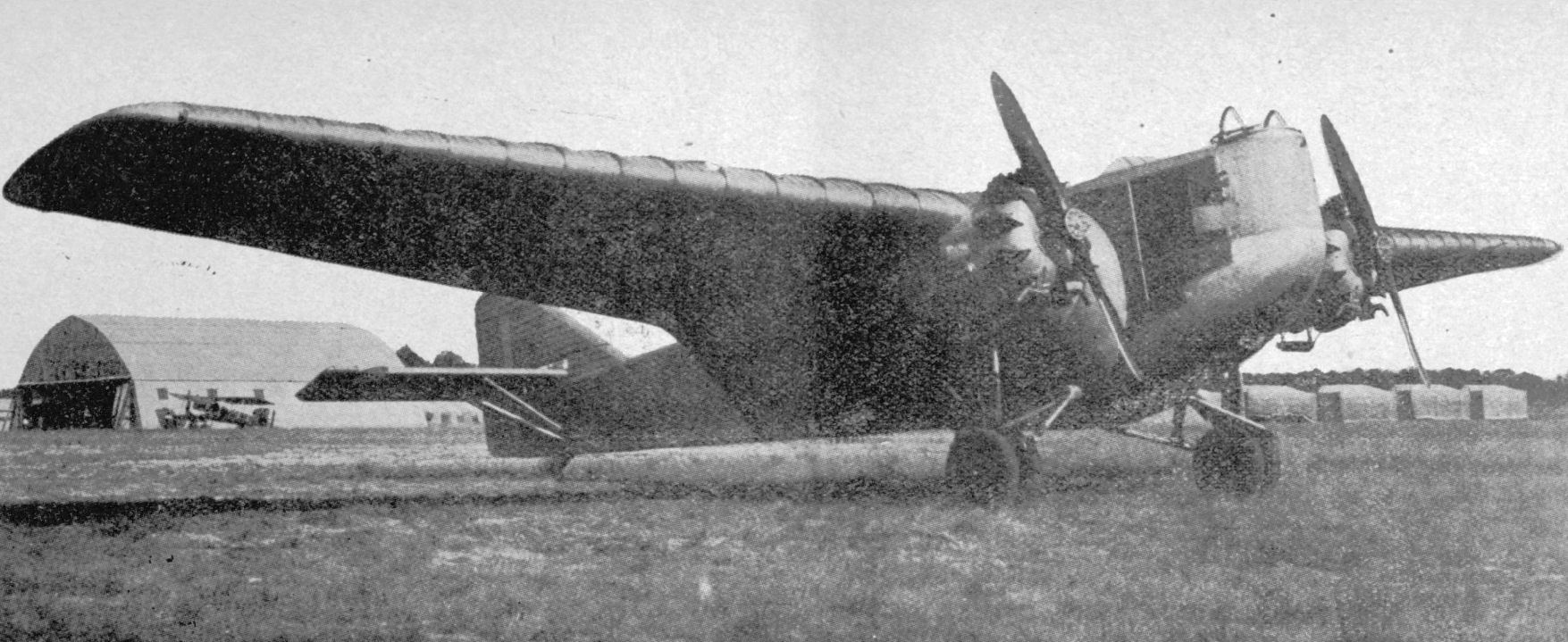

General information
- Type: Ground attack aircraft
- National origin: France
- Manufacturer: Dyle et Bacalan
- Number built: 1

History
- First flight: c. September 1929

The Dyle and Bacalan DB-20 was a heavily armoured, all-metal, French ground attack aircraft built in the late 1920s.

== Design and development ==
The DB-20 was an all-metal monoplane with a mixture of steel and duralumin tube frames and duralumin skin. Designed as a ground attack aircraft, it was heavily armoured. An earlier Dyle and Bacalan twin engine design, the DB-10 had a very deep airfoil centre section between the engines which replaced the forward fuselage. The DB-20 refined this layout; on it the section between the engines was again a single structural unit but it became thinner rapidly outwards to the engines. This large structure was built on steel frames and was duralumin skinned; internal dural frames supported armoured sheets which protected the crew from ground fire. Two 310 kW (420 hp) Gnome-Rhône Jupiter 9Ad nine cylinder radial engines on the leading edge of the centre section, closely cowled but with cylinder heads exposed, were positioned at the junction between the inner section and two outer panels. These panels were straight tapered, with blunt tips and had a novel internal structure with multiple, converging beams in place of the usual one or two spars; the beams shared flanges formed by variable section boxes which replaced the ribs in forming the airfoil section under a dural skin. Narrow chord ailerons filled almost all the trailing edges outboard of the engines.

The rest of the fuselage of the DB-20 came in two parts, each joined to the central section. The foreword section was a conventional flat-sided fuselage with an open nose-gunner's position, equipped with a machine gun on a flexible mounting. Like the centre section it was heavily armoured, with 3 mm (0.12 in) thick walls and a 4–5 mm (0.16–0.20 in) floor providing protection from ground fire at altitudes above 250 m (820 ft) The other three crew positions were in the central section, pilot and mechanic sitting side-by-side in an open cockpit at the leading edge and with a mid-upper gunner or observer, who could also drop bombs, close behind them. The rear fuselage section was a large, flat sided duralumin beam with frames and riveted skin. It carried a blunted triangular fin and deep balanced rudder. The DB-20's rectangular, high aspect ratio tailplane was mounted on the fin just above the fuselage, braced to it with V-struts and carrying overhung (balanced) elevators.

Its undercarriage was fixed and conventional with two pairs of mainwheels set 3.90 m (12 ft 10 in) apart under the engines. They were mounted on vertical V-form struts from the inner sides of the engine mountings and oblique, almost horizontal N-struts from the bottom of the fuselage. The latter were connected to a horizontal box containing the integrated oleo type shock absorbers. Its tailskid had an oil filled shock absorber.

The exact date of the first flight of the DB-20 is not known but it was not long before the beginning of October 1929, flown from Mérignac by Charles Descamps, the Dyle and Bacalan test pilot. First impressions of speed and manoeuvrability were good, though the armour had yet to be fitted. By March 1929, possibly with the armour in place, provisional, unofficial performance figures were well below the theoretical predictions of the previous October, with a speed of 180 km/h (110 mph) and a time to 1,000 m (3,300 ft) of 13 minutes.

On 23 May 1929 the DB-20 was flown from Mérignac by Descamps, with their technical director Létang as passenger, to the government testing centre at Villacoublay. Fuel consumption was higher than anticipated and they had to put down in a field about 15 km (9.3 mi) from their destination. Nonetheless, they arrived safely after about 6 hours from departure. There are no known reports on the outcome of these tests, or indeed on any other later activity of the DB.20.

== Specifications ==
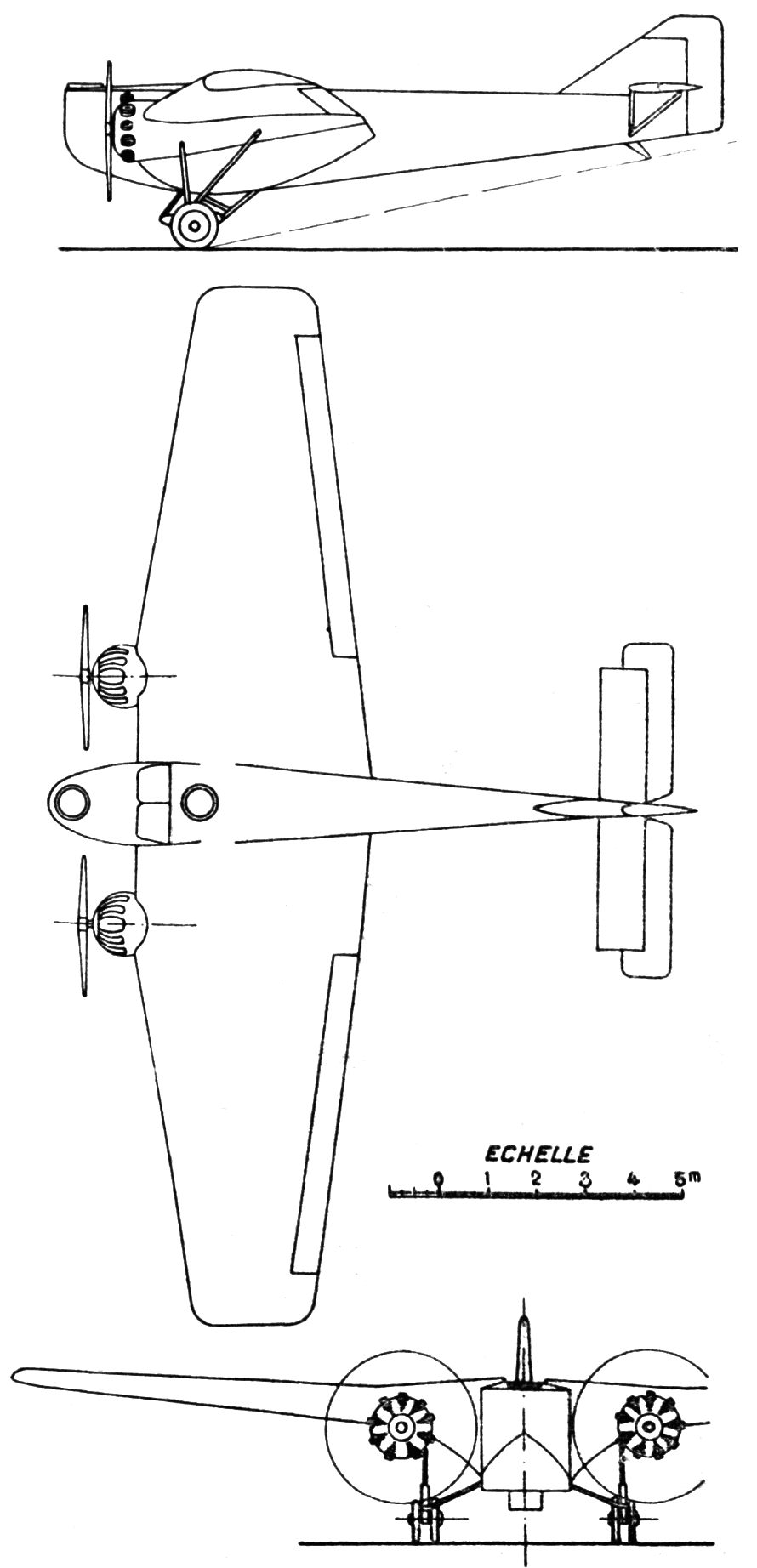
Dyle et Bacalan DB-20 3-view drawing from L'Aérophile March,1929

Data from Les Ailes October 1928. Performance figures were calculated.

General characteristics

- Crew: Four
- Length: 13.50 m (44 ft 3 in)
- Wingspan: 21.0 m (68 ft 11 in)
- Height: 4.67 m (15 ft 4 in)
- Wing area: 73 m^{2} (790 sq ft)
- Empty weight: 2,300 kg (5,071 lb)
- Gross weight: 4,700 kg (10,362 lb)
- Fuel capacity: 400 kg (880 lb)
- Powerplant: 2 × Gnome-Rhône Jupiter 9Ad 9-cylinder radial engine, 310 kW (420 hp) each
- Propellers: 2-bladed

Performance

- Maximum speed: 220 km/h (140 mph, 120 kn) at ground level
- Endurance: 2 hours
- Service ceiling: 4,400 m (14,400 ft)
- Rate of climb: 2.5 m/s (490 ft/min)
