= RTAF-5 =

Trainer / forward air controller aircraft

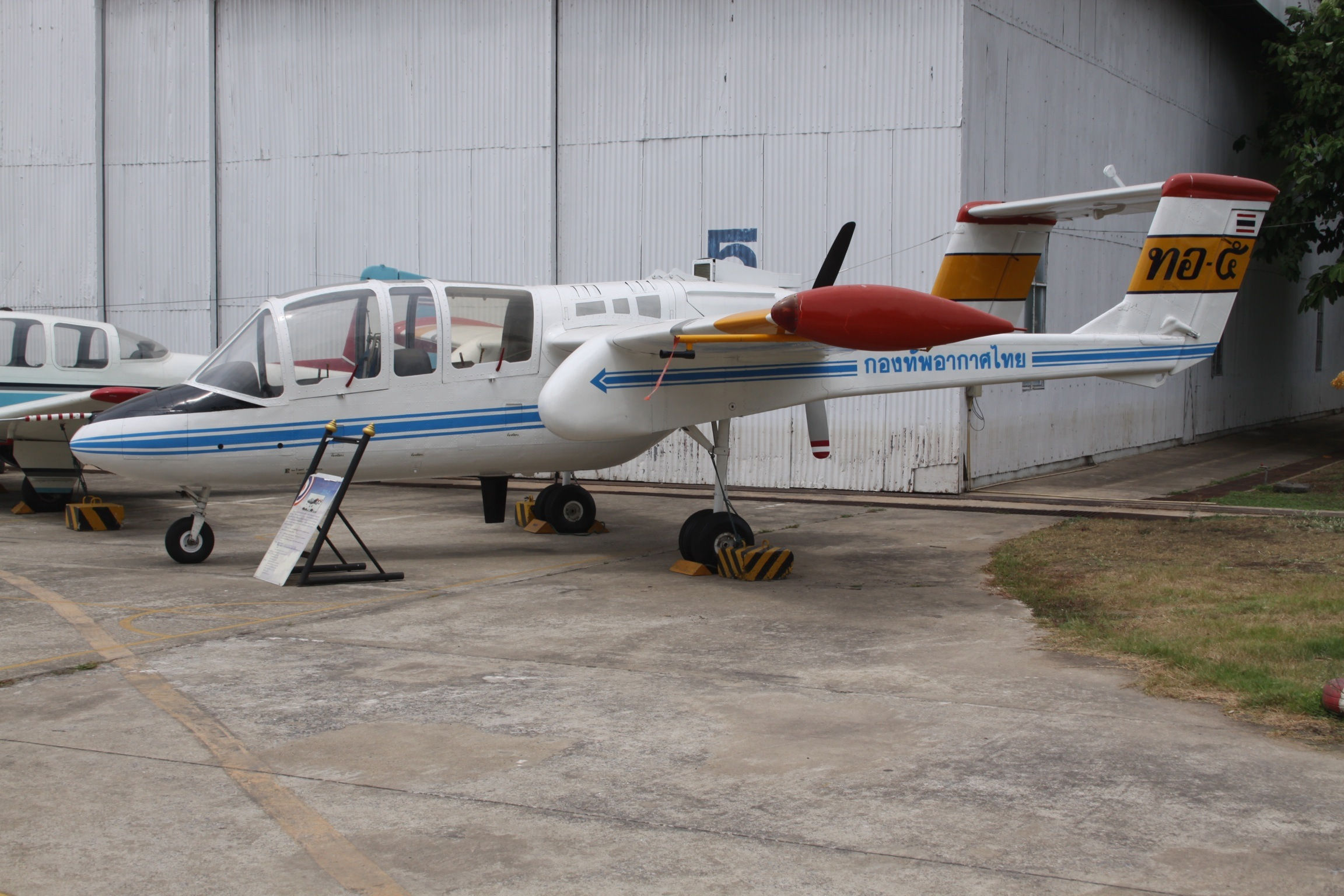

General information
- Type: Trainer/forward air controller aircraft
- National origin: Thailand
- Manufacturer: Thai Aviation Industry
- Status: Prototype
- Number built: 1

History
- First flight: 5 October 1984

The RTAF-5, officially designated B.ThO.5 (Thai: บ.ทอ.๕), is a Thai training and forward air control aircraft developed and built by the Science and Weapon Systems Development Centre of the Royal Thai Air Force in the 1980s. It was a twin-boom configuration aircraft powered by a single pusher turboprop engine, but only a single example was built.

== Development and design ==
In 1976, the Science and Weapon Systems Development Centre of the Royal Thai Air Force, based at Don Muang Air Base, Bangkok, started development of a trainer/forward air control aircraft, the RTAF-5. It was a single-engined high-wing monoplane of all-metal construction with twin booms, and with a fuselage resembling that of an OV-10 Bronco, but powered by a single Allison 250 turboprop engine at the rear of the fuselage. It had a retractable nosewheel undercarriage and had four underwing hardpoints, with wingtip fuel tanks.

The prototype first flew on 5 October 1984, with the undercarriage fixed for early testing. Development was delayed by the license production of RFB Fantrainers by the RTAF, and was eventually abandoned, only the single prototype (which is preserved at the Royal Thai Air Force Museum) being flown, with a second example being used for static testing.

== Specifications ==
Data from Air International February 1986

General characteristics

- Crew: 2
- Length: 9.96 m (32 ft 8 in)
- Wingspan: 9.55 m (3 ft 4 in) (Span over tip tanks 9.86 m (32 ft 3⅝ in)
- Height: 3.05 m (10 ft 0 in)
- Wing area: 15.67 m^{2} (168.7 sq ft) (including tip tanks)
- Empty weight: 1,645 kg (3,628 lb)
- Max takeoff weight: 2,154 kg (4,750 lb)
- Powerplant: 1 × Allison 250-B17-C turboprop, 313 kW (420 hp)

Performance

- Maximum speed: 333 km/h (207 mph, 180 kn) at 3,050 m (10,000 ft) (max cruise)
- Cruise speed: 296 km/h (184 mph, 160 kn) (econ cruise)

Armament

- Hardpoints: 4 with a capacity of up to 68 kg (150 lb) on inner, 100 lb (45 kg) on outer

== See also ==
Related lists

- COIN aircraft
