= Friedrichshafen FF.34 =

FF.34
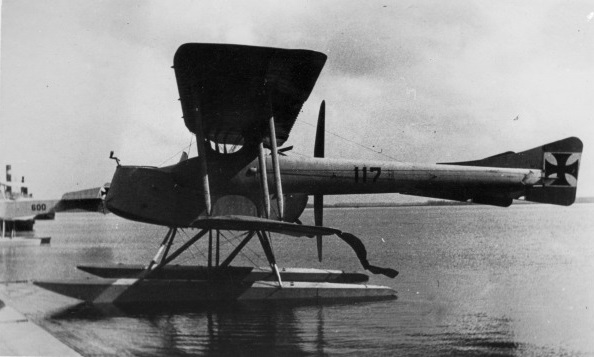

General information
- Type: Experimental maritime reconnaissance floatplane
- Manufacturer: Flugzeugbau Friedrichshafen
- Primary user: Imperial German Navy
- Number built: 1

History
- First flight: 1916
- Developed into: Friedrichshafen FF.44?

The Friedrichshafen FF.34 was an experimental two-seat maritime reconnaissance floatplane built by Friedrichshafen Aircraft Construction Company (Flugzeugbau Friedrichshafen) for the Imperial German Navy's (Kaiserliche Marine) Naval Air Service (Marine-Fliegerabteilung) during the First World War. Completed in 1916, the aircraft was intended to evaluate the performance of its Maybach Mb.IV engine in an aircraft in a pusher configuration as well as the suitability of the configuration for the maritime patrol mission. The FF.34's configuration was deemed obsolete and its design was structurally weak; some of its components may have been utilized by the FF.44 in 1917.

== Development and design ==
The FF.34 was built because the Naval Air Service wished to further evaluate the pusher configuration initially tested in the cruder Friedrichshafen FF.31 in 1915 as well as test the new and powerful water-cooled 240-metric-horsepower (177 kW) Maybach Mb.IV straight-six engine previously used aboard Zeppelins. To this end the FF.31's drag-inducing open-framework booms that connected the tail structure and single large vertical stabilizer and rudder were replaced by streamlined booms that terminated in smaller vertical stabilizers and rudders. These booms were attached to the middle of the inner interplane struts that connected with upper and lower wings; being higher off the water, the FF.31's tail float was eliminated. The configuration of the FF.34 was otherwise similar to the FF.31 with the observer's position in the nose of the central nacelle with the pilot's cockpit between it and the engine in the rear. The radiator was suspended from the upper wing between the cockpit and the engine. The aircraft's armament consisted of a 7.92-millimeter (0.312 in) Parabellum MG14 machine gun on a flexible mount for the observer.

The prototype was delivered to Seaplane Experimental Command (Seeflugzeug-Versuchs-Kommando (SVK)) on 24 January 1916 for flight testing. This revealed that the booms were too weak and the FF.34 was returned to Friedrichshafen on 22 April. The company redelivered it to the SVK on 4 May 1917, but it was still not strong enough. Aviation historian Jack Herris states that the aircraft's wings and engine were reused in the FF.44, but historian Siegfried Borzutzki says that the aircraft was an entirely new design.

== Variants ==
FF.34
Prototype twin-boom pusher floatplane.
FF.44
FF.34 converted with a conventional fuselage and tail unit.

== Operators ==
German Empire

- Imperial German Navy

== Specifications (FF.34) ==
Data from Flugzeugbau Friedrichshafen GmbH: Diplom-Ingenieur Theodor Kober

General characteristics

- Crew: 2
- Length: 10.85 m (35 ft 7 in)
- Wingspan: 18.4 m (60 ft 4 in)
- Height: 4.1 m (13 ft 5 in)
- Powerplant: 1 × Maybach Mb.IV water-cooled straight-six engine, 180 kW (240 hp)
- Propellers: 2-bladed fixed-pitch

Armament

- Guns: 1 × 7.92 mm (0.312 in) Parabellum MG14 machine gun for observer

== See also ==
Related lists

- List of military aircraft of Germany
- List of flying boats and floatplanes

== Bibliography ==
- Borzutzki, Siegfried (1993). Flugzeugbau Friedrichshafen GmbH: Diplom-Ingenieur Theodor Kober [Friedrichshafen Aircraft Company: Diploma-Engineer Theodore Kober] (in German). Burbach. ISBN 3-927513-60-1.
- Düsing, Michael (2022). German & Austro-Hungarian Aero Engines of WWI. Vol. 3. Aeronaut Books. ISBN 978-1-953201-53-9.
- Herris, Jack (2016). Friedrichshafen Aircraft of WWI: A Centennial Perspective on Great War Airplanes. Great War Aviation Centennial Series. Vol. 21. Charleston, South Carolina: Aeronaut Books. ISBN 978-1-935881-35-3.
