= Schneider Sch-10M =

French military aircraft

Schneider Sch.10M
- At the 1924 Paris Salon

General information
- Type: Bomber aircraft
- National origin: France
- Manufacturer: Schneider et Cie
- Number built: 1

History
- First flight: March 1925

The Schneider Sch.10M was an all-metal, twin-boom, twin-engine French aircraft from the mid-1920s, intended as a bomber and with strong defensive armament. Only one was built.

== Design and development ==
The Schneider Sch-10M was an unusual aircraft in several ways. It was a twin-engine, twin-boom monoplane design built entirely from metal, both its structure and skin made from Schneider's own aluminium alloy called "Alferium". It was intended for bombing, and carried photographic and radio equipment for observation, so needed strong defensive armament; the design was influenced by the need to give its two gunners the maximum field of fire.

It had a cantilever, single-piece, two-spar wing, its covering, like that of the central fuselage and empennage corrugated with a separation of about 75 mm (3 in). In plan, the wing was rectangular between the fuselage and booms and slightly straight tapered outboard. The central fuselage was rectangular in section and contained three open cockpits. The pilots sat side by side in a wide cockpit over the wing leading edge with one gunner in the extreme nose and the other where the fuselage began to fall away rapidly, ending at the wing trailing edge. To improve the defence against attacks from below, the rear gunner could also fire through a trapdoor in the floor.

The two beams were covered in smooth Alferium; behind the wing they were inverted, convex teardop-shaped in section and tapered to the tail. At the front, each had a 300 kW (400 hp) Lorraine-Dietrich 12Db water-cooled 12-cylinder upright V-12 engine driving a two-blade propeller. The radiators were placed on both sides of the cowlings, and the fuel tanks were in the booms behind the engines, seen as a relatively safe place in case of attack. Each main wheel of the wide track, tailskid undercarriage was rubber-sprung on a V strut enclosed by a bulged and tapered continuous extension of the boom underside. At the rear the booms were linked by a rectangular tailplane carrying a single elevator. The booms mounted small fins with deep, balanced rudders.

The Sch-10M appeared at the Paris Aero Show in December 1924 and flew for the first time in March 1925; only one was built. There are few contemporary reports on it after the Show.

== Specifications ==
Data from L'Aéronautique (December 1924, p.52) Performance figures estimated.

General characteristics

- Crew: Four
- Length: 11.70 m (38 ft 5 in)
- Wingspan: 18.50 m (60 ft 8 in)
- Height: 3.30 m (10 ft 10 in)
- Wing area: 57 m^{2} (610 sq ft)
- Empty weight: 2,650 kg (5,842 lb)
- Max takeoff weight: 3,650 kg (8,047 lb)
- Powerplant: 2 × Lorraine-Dietrich 12Db 12-cylinder upright V-12 engines, water cooled, 300 kW (400 hp) each
- Propellers: 2-bladed

Performance

- Maximum speed: 220 km/h (140 mph, 120 kn) at 5,000 m (16,400 ft)
- Service ceiling: 7,000 m (23,000 ft)

Armament

- Three pairs of machine guns
