= Surrey Flying Services AL.1 =

AL.1

General information
- Type: Trainer
- National origin: United Kingdom
- Manufacturer: Surrey Flying Services Ltd
- Designer: John Bewsher
- Number built: 1

History
- First flight: 1929

The Surrey Flying Services AL.1 was a single-engined side-by-side two-seat training biplane, built at a UK flying club in 1929. Only one was built, but it was flying until the outbreak of war in 1939 and remains in storage.

== Development ==
Surrey Flying Services Ltd operated a flying school from Croydon Aerodrome. In 1929 they built a biplane designed by John Bewsher, who had earlier designed the ANEC Missel Thrush. The Surrey Flying Services AL.1 was a single-engined side-by-side two-seater. It was a single-bay biplane, with considerable stagger and with wings of constant and equal chord, built using spruce and three ply construction with fabric covering. The upper wing span was slightly greater than that of the lower. Simple spruce parallel interplane struts were used, leaning slightly outwards; on the underside of the lower wing, beneath these struts, were fitted looped wire protector skids. The centre section was supported by two pairs of outward-leaning cabane struts linking the upper fuselage longerons to the front and rear wing spars. The rear pair of these was just in front of the open cockpit; above the occupants the wing trailing edge was cut back to the rear spar for improved visibility, and the lower wing had small nicks at the root for the same purpose.

The fuselage was flat sided, fabric covered over ash longerons with a rounded decking, deepest at the cockpit, from tail to nose. The tail surfaces were also fabric covered wooden structures. The fin was quite small and triangular, carrying a generous, semicircular unbalanced rudder on a hinge which leaned forward in flying attitude. The rudder continued down to the fuselage bottom, so the elevators, mounted with the tailplane on the top of the fuselage had a cut out in which it could move. The cockpit was fully upholstered, with a large luggage space behind that could alternatively have seated a child. The AL.1 was powered by a 95 hp (71 kW) seven cylinder Salmson AC.7 radial engine, mounted without a cowling and driving a two-bladed propeller. The undercarriage was a single axle unit with the main legs attached at the front spar roots. The legs were braced, unusually, by struts from the axle to the forward fuselage just behind the engine. The undercarriage legs splayed outwards to produce a large track. The wheels were wire braced, though in some images they are covered. There was a tailskid on the rear fuselage.

The AL.1 first flew in 1929. Registered G-AALP in the name of the Flying School secretary it flew occasionally until 1931. Plans to market it and a proposed Cirrus engined variant were defeated by the economic depression, and in 1931 the sole AL.1 was stored. In September 1936 there was an advertisement in Flight, offering it for sale at £65. In May 1938 it was bought by Bertram Arden of Exeter, who restored and flew it up to the outbreak of war in 1939. It is currently stored by the Arden Family Trust.

== Specifications ==
Data from Ord-Hume 2000, pp. 478

General characteristics

- Length: 20 ft 0 in (6.10 m)
- Wingspan: 28 ft 9 in (8.76 m)
- Height: 8 ft 5 in (2.57 m)
- Wing area: 216 sq ft (20.1 m^{2})
- Empty weight: 680 lb (308 kg)
- Gross weight: 1,200 lb (544 kg)
- Powerplant: 1 × Salmson AC.7 7-cylinder air cooled radial, 95 hp (71 kW)

Performance

- Maximum speed: 110 mph (180 km/h, 96 kn)
- Cruise speed: 100 mph (160 km/h, 87 kn)
- Stall speed: 42 mph (68 km/h, 36 kn)
- Range: 200 mi (320 km, 170 nmi)

== Bibliography ==
=== Cited sources ===
- Ellis, Ken. (2006). Wrecks & Relics. Hinkley, Leicestershire: Midland Publishing. ISBN 1-85780-235-7.
- Jackson, A.J. (1960). British Civil Aircraft 1919-59. Vol. 2. London: Putnam Publishing.
- Ord-Hume, Arthur W.J.G. (2000). British Light Aeroplanes. Peterborough: GMS Enterprises. ISBN 978-1-870384-76-6.
- "Aircraft for the Private Owner: A.L.1". Flight. Vol. XXII, no. 1110. 4 April 1930. p. 388.
