= AGO C.IV =

German biplane reconnaissance aircraft

C.IV
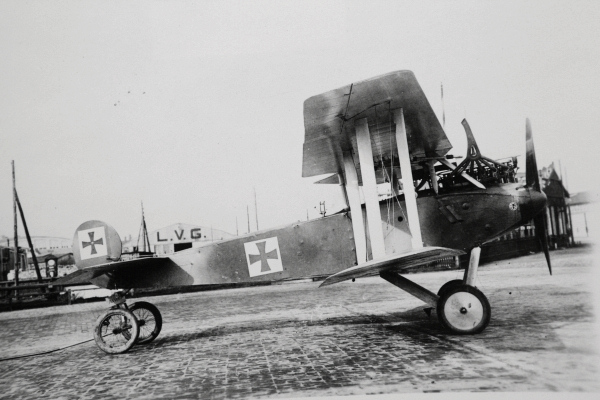

General information
- Type: Reconnaissance
- Manufacturer: AGO Flugzeugwerke
- Primary users: Luftstreitkräfte Estonian Air Force
- Number built: c. 70-100 (260 ordered)

History
- Introduction date: 1917

The AGO C.IV was a German biplane reconnaissance aircraft designed and produced by the German aircraft manufacturer AGO Flugzeugwerke. It was active with the Luftstreitkräfte during the latter half of the First World War.

The C.IV was developed as a dedicated aerial reconnaissance platform and followed a generally conventional design for the era. However, it was equipped with sharply tapered wings that had a complex structure; additionally, it was initially designed without a vertical fin, although one was promptly added when directional stability proved to be insufficient. The fuselage, while otherwise of an orthodox design, featured composite construction. Some of these design choices are thought to have made the C.IV relatively complex to manufacture, which likely hindered the type's production rate considerably.

Within the opening weeks of 1917, the C.IV was operational with the Luftstreitkräfte. Although commonly recognised as being a relatively fast and well-armed aircraft for the era, the C.IV proved to be somewhat unstable during flight, and thus was typically disliked by pilots. Its limited availability also made its impact on the war negligible at best. Despite the efforts of three separate manufacturers to produce the type, less than 100 C.IVs were completed by the enactment of the Armistice of 11 November 1918 that ended the conflict. In addition to the Luftstreitkräfte, it was also operated by the Estonian Air Force during the early Interwar period.

== Development ==
During 1916, the German aircraft manufacturer AGO Flugzeugwerke commenced work on a new combat aircraft for the Luftstreitkräfte. It was intended to be a high performance aircraft for the era, specifically to be used in the aerial reconnaissance role, yet provide a good field of defensive fire. The general configuration of the aircraft represented a departure from the manufacturer's preference for the pod-and-boom configuration. The C.IV's original design lacked a fixed vertical fin and had a comma-shaped rudder; this arrangement was revised for production, bolstering directional stability by adding a vertical fin and substantially easing the strain imposed on its pilots. The tail unit would also see considerable revision, the original cable bracing arrangement being substituted for a rigid diagonal strut supported by streamlined steel tubing. As designed, the C.IV only included a single pair of ailerons on the upper wing, yet many production aircraft would feature an additional pair on the lower wing as well.

While the design generally conformed with common conventions amongst military aircraft of the era, the C.IV was equipped with somewhat unusual wings, being sharply tapered from the center section of the wing. The main box spars supporting the wings were also atypically converged from root to tip. The I-section ribs were composed of poplar and fretted with lightening holes; the ribs of each panel were of a different size as well as being spaced at varying distances. The inner front interplane strut was deliberately omitted in order to improve the observer's forward field of fire. According to the aviation historians Peter Grey and Owen Thetford, the wings posed considerable manufacturing difficulty due to their complex design, and was a major factor in the limited production run for the type.

The C.IV had a largely conventional fuselage structure, although some use of composite construction was made in the form of wooden longerons, steel tube spacers, and internal wire bracing (aft of the cockpit only) to form a relatively strong box girder structure. The top decking was completely detachable to facilitate servicing and repairs. While metal paneling enclosed the nose, engine, and forward-firing machine gun, the majority of the fuselage was covered in plywood while the wings had a fabric covering instead. The undercarriage was supported by streamlined steel tubes and featured a claw-like brake arrangement. Fuel was housed in a main tank directly beneath the pilot; the piping to the engine cleanly ran through the center-section struts. Both the pilot and observer were provided with machine guns for self-defense purposes.

The C.IV was active in small numbers in the opening weeks of 1917. Pilots of these early examples often disliked them, commonly noting their instability during flight. It was believed that roughly 70 aircraft in total saw action with the Luftstreitkräfte; despite a considerably larger number having been ordered both from AGO and two other aircraft manufacturers who were to build the type under licence.

== Operators ==
Estonia

- Estonian Air Force

German Empire

- Luftstreitkräfte

== Specifications ==
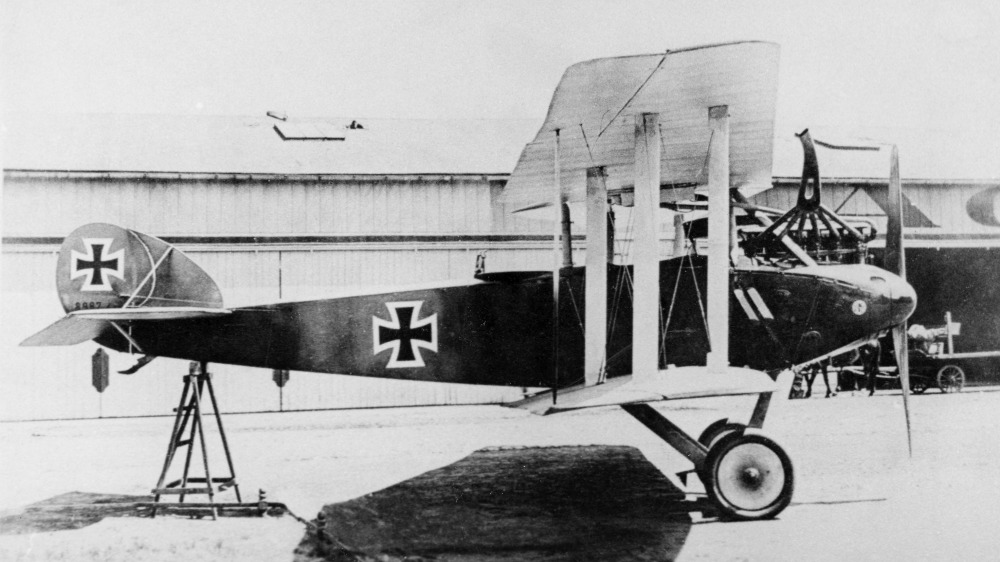
Late production AGO C.IV on trestle

Data from German Aircraft of the First World War

General characteristics

- Crew: 2
- Length: 8.25 m (27 ft 1 in)
- Wingspan: 11.9 m (39 ft 1 in)
- Height: 3.5 m (11 ft 6 in)
- Wing area: 37.5 m^{2} (404 sq ft)
- Empty weight: 900 kg (1,984 lb)
- Gross weight: 1,350 kg (2,976 lb)
- Powerplant: 1 × Benz Bz.IV six-cylinder water-cooled in-line piston engine, 160 kW (220 hp)

Performance

- Maximum speed: 190 km/h (120 mph, 100 kn)
- Endurance: Four hours
- Service ceiling: 5,500 m (18,000 ft)
- Time to altitude: 3,000 m (9,843 ft) in 22 minutes

Armament

- Guns:
  - 1 x fixed forward firing MG 08 "Spandau" machine gun fired by the pilot
  - 1 x Parabellum MG 14 machine gun aimed by the Observer.
