= AGO C.I =

German reconnaissance biplane

C.I
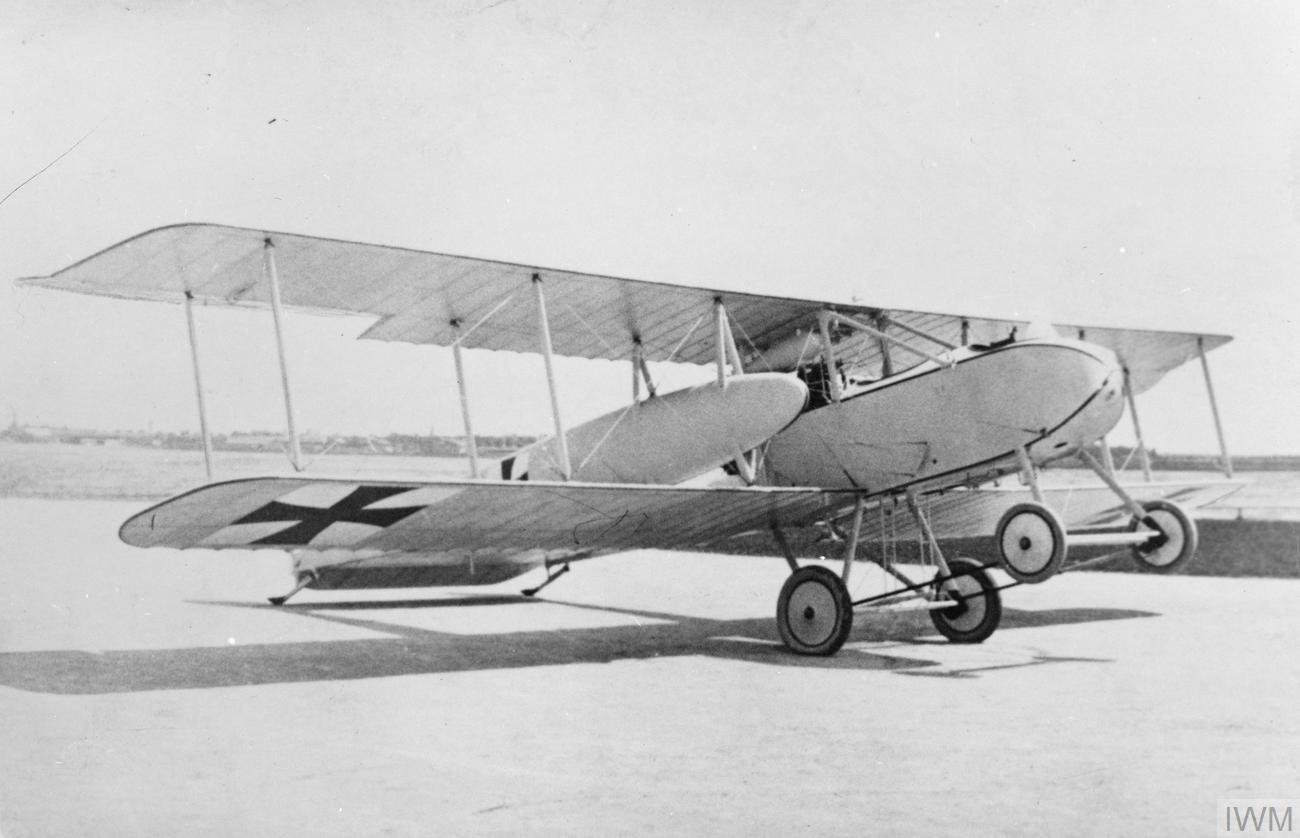
- Forward oblique view of the AGO C.I

General information
- Type: Reconnaissance
- Manufacturer: AGO Flugzeugwerke
- Designer: August Häfeli
- Primary user: Germany
- Number built: 64

History
- Introduction date: June 1915
- Variant: AGO C.II

The AGO C.I was a First World War German pusher reconnaissance biplane that used a pod-and-boom configuration.

== Development ==
The crew and pusher engine shared a central nacelle, and the twin booms carried the tail and the four-wheeled landing gear. The observer sat at the nose and was armed with a machine gun.

A single example was fitted with floats for coastal patrol duties for the Imperial German Navy (designation C.I-W).

== Operators ==
German Empire

- Luftstreitkrafte
- Kaiserliche Marine

== Specifications ==
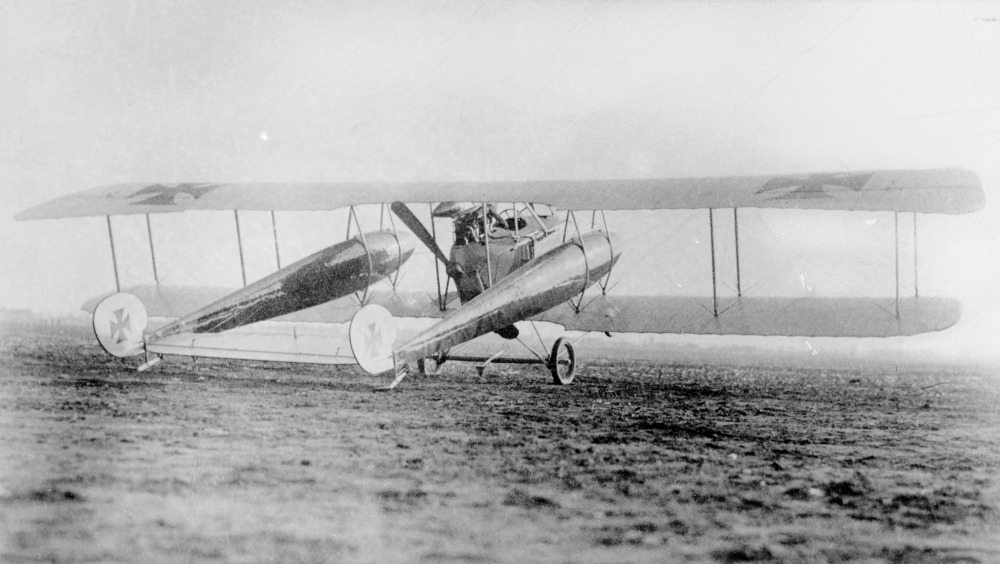
AGO C.I

Data from Ago C.I

General characteristics

- Crew: two, pilot and observer
- Length: 9.30 m (30 ft 6 in)
- Wingspan: 15.10 m (49 ft 6 in)
- Height: 3.10 m (10 ft 2 in)
- Wing area: 47.6 m^{2} (512 sq ft)
- Empty weight: 960 kg (2,116 lb)
- Gross weight: 1,495 kg (3,296 lb)
- Powerplant: 1 × Mercedes D.III , 120 kW (160 hp)

Performance

- Maximum speed: 130 km/h (81 mph, 70 kn)
- Range: 480 km (300 mi, 260 nmi)
- Endurance: 3 hr
- Time to altitude: 9.5 min to 1,000 m (3,300 ft)

Armament

- 1 × 7.92 mm Parabellum machine gun

== See also ==
Aircraft of comparable role, configuration, and era

- Farman F.40
- Gotha WD.3
- Häfeli DH-1
- Royal Aircraft Factory F.E.2
- Voisin V
