= List of interwar military aircraft =

Interwar military aircraft are military aircraft that were developed and used between World War I and World War II, also known as the Golden Age of Aviation.

For the purposes of this list this is defined as aircraft that entered service into any country's military after the armistice on 11 November 1918 and before the Invasion of Poland on 1 September 1939.

Aircraft are listed alphabetically by their country of origin. Civilian aircraft modified for military use are included but those that remained primarily civilian aircraft are not.

== List ==
=== Argentina ===
- FMA AeC.2 trainer and observation
- FMA AeMB.2 bomber

=== Australia ===
- Tugan Gannet transport
- Bristol Bulldog fighter

=== Belgium ===
- ACAZ C.2 fighter
- LACAB GR.8 reconnaissance bomber
- Renard R.31 reconnaissance
- Stampe et Vertongen RSV.22 trainer
- Stampe et Vertongen RSV.26 trainer
- Stampe et Vertongen RSV.32 trainer
- Stampe et Vertongen SV.5 Tornado trainer

=== Brazil ===
- CAP-4 Paulistinha trainer
- Muniz M-7 trainer
- Muniz M-9 trainer

=== Bulgaria ===
- DAR 1 trainer

=== Canada ===
- Canadian Vickers Vigil trainer/transport
- Canadian Vickers Vista patrol
- Canadian Vickers Vancouver patrol seaplane
- Canadian Vickers Varuna patrol seaplane
- Canadian Vickers Vedette patrol seaplane
- Curtiss Canuck trainer
- Curtiss-Reid Rambler trainer
- Fleet Fawn trainer
- Fleet Finch trainer

=== Czechoslovakia ===
- Aero A.14 reconnaissance
- Aero A.18 fighter
- Aero A.32 army co-operation
- Aero A.100 light reconnaissance bomber
- Aero A.101 light reconnaissance bomber
- Avia B.122 trainer
- Avia BH-3 fighter
- Avia BH-21 fighter
- Avia BH-33 fighter
- Avia B-534 fighter
- Letov Š-4 fighter
- Letov Š-16 bomber
- Letov Š-20 fighter
- Letov Š-28 reconnaissance
- Letov Š-31 fighter
- Praga BH-41 trainer
- Praga E-39 trainer

=== Denmark ===
- Orlogsværftet H-Maskinen reconnaissance
- Orlogsværftet O-Maskinen reconnaissance/trainer

=== Estonia ===
- Post, Tooma & Org PTO-4 trainer

=== Finland ===
- VL Sääski trainer
- VL Kotka patrol bomber
- VL Paarma trainer
- VL Tuisku trainer
- VL Viima trainer
- VL Pyry trainer

=== France ===
- Amiot 120 bomber
- Amiot 143 bomber
- ANF Les Mureaux 113 reconnaissance
- Besson MB.411 submarine observation floatplane
- Blériot 127 bomber
- Blériot-SPAD S.51 fighter
- Blériot-SPAD S.61 fighter
- Blériot-SPAD S.81 fighter
- Blériot-SPAD S.91 fighter
- Blériot-SPAD S.510 fighter
- Bloch MB.81 ambulance
- Bloch MB.120 transport
- Bloch MB.131 reconnaissance bomber
- Bloch MB.200 bomber
- Bloch MB.210 bomber
- Breguet 19 light reconnaissance bomber
- Breguet 270 Series reconnaissance
- Breguet 413 light reconnaissance bomber
- Breguet 460 light bomber
- Breguet 470 transport
- CAMS 37 reconnaissance flying boat
- CAMS 55 reconnaissance flying boat
- Caudron C.59 trainer
- Caudron C.60 trainer
- Caudron C.270 trainer
- Caudron C.440 Goéland transport
- Caudron Simoun light transport
- Caudron C.690 trainer
- Dewoitine D.1 fighter
- Dewoitine D.9 fighter
- Dewoitine D.21 fighter
- Dewoitine D.27 fighter
- Dewoitine D.371 fighter
- Dewoitine D.500 fighter
- Farman F.60 Goliath transport/night bomber
- Farman F.160 heavy bomber
- Farman F.220 heavy bomber/transport
- FBA 17 flying boat trainer
- FBA 19 flying boat bomber
- FBA 290 vip transport flying boat
- Gourdou-Leseurre GL.2 fighter
- Gourdou-Leseurre GL.30 fighter/racer
- Gourdou-Leseurre GL-812 HY reconnaissance floatplane
- Hanriot HD.14 trainer
- Hanriot HD.17 floatplane trainer
- Hanriot HD.19 trainer
- Hanriot HD.28 trainer
- Hanriot HD.32 trainer
- Hanriot H.43 trainer
- Hanriot H.180 light transport/liaison
- Latécoère 290 floatplane torpedo bomber
- Latécoère 300 maritime reconnaissance flying boat
- Latham 43 flying boat bomber
- Latham 47 transatlantic flying boat
- Levasseur PL.4 carrier-based reconnaissance
- Levasseur PL.5 carrier-based fighter
- Levasseur PL.7 torpedo bomber
- Levasseur PL.14 torpedo bomber
- Levasseur PL.15 torpedo bomber
- Lioré et Olivier LeO 20 night bomber
- Lioré et Olivier LeO 214 transport
- Lioré et Olivier LeO 25 bomber
- Loire 46 fighter
- Loire 70 maritime reconnaissance flying boat
- Loire 130 reconnaissance flying boat
- Morane Saulnier MoS.35 trainer
- Morane-Saulnier MoS.50 trainer
- Morane-Saulnier MS.130 trainer
- Morane-Saulnier MS.138 trainer
- Morane-Saulnier MS.147 trainer
- Morane-Saulnier MS.180 trainer
- Morane-Saulnier MS.225 fighter
- Morane-Saulnier MS.230 trainer
- Morane-Saulnier MS.315 trainer
- Morane-Saulnier MS.341 trainer
- Morane-Saulnier MS.406 fighter
- Nieuport 28 C.1 fighter
- Nieuport-Delage NiD 29 fighter
- Nieuport-Delage NiD 52 fighter
- Nieuport-Delage NiD 62 fighter
- Nieuport-Delage NiD-120 fighter
- Potez 15 observation
- Potez 25 fighter-bomber
- Potez 29 transport
- Potez 39 reconnaissance/observation
- Potez 452 shipboard reconnaissance flying boat
- Potez 540 bomber
- Potez 56 transport
- Potez 58 patrol
- Potez 630 heavy fighter
- Romano R.82 trainer
- Romano R.83 trainer
- Romano R.92 trainer
- SAB-SEMA 12 trainer
- SAB AB-20 bomber
- SAB AB-80 bomber
- SPAD S.XX fighter
- SPCA 30 light bomber
- SPCA 40T transport
- SPCA 90 transport
- SPCA 80 transport
- Wibault 7 fighter

=== Germany ===
- Ago Ao 192 transport
- Albatros Al 101 trainer
- Arado Ar 64 fighter
- Arado Ar 65 fighter
- Arado Ar 66 trainer
- Arado Ar 68 fighter
- Arado Ar 76 lightweight fighter
- Arado Ar 95 reconnaissance floatplane
- Arado Ar 96 trainer
- Arado Ar 196 reconnaissance floatplane
- Arado SC I trainer
- Arado SC II trainer
- Blohm & Voss Ha 137 ground attack
- Blohm & Voss Ha 140 floatplane torpedo bomber
- Bücker Bü 131 trainer
- Bücker Bü 133 trainer
- DFS SG 38 Schulgleiter training glider
- Dornier Do J seaplane
- Dornier Do Y bomber
- Dornier Do 11 bomber
- Dornier Do 17 bomber
- Dornier Do 18 flying boat patrol bomber
- Dornier Do 19 heavy bomber
- Dornier Do 22 reconnaissance torpedo bomber
- Dornier Do 23 bomber
- Dornier Do 24 patrol bomber flying boat
- Dornier Do 26 flying boat patrol bomber
- Fieseler Fi 156 observation
- Fieseler Fi 167 torpedo bomber
- Flettner Fl 265 experimental helicopter
- Focke-Wulf Fw 44 trainer
- Focke-Wulf Fw 56 advanced trainer
- Focke-Wulf Fw 58 trainer
- Focke-Wulf Fw 61 experimental helicopter
- Focke-Wulf Fw 187 heavy fighter
- Focke-Wulf Fw 200 transport/bomber
- Gotha Go 145 trainer
- Heinkel He-2 reconnaissance floatplane
- Heinkel HE 8 reconnaissance floatplane
- Heinkel HD 17 reconnaissance
- Heinkel HD 24 trainer floatplane
- Heinkel HD 25 reconnaissance floatplane
- Heinkel HD 36 trainer
- Heinkel HD 37 fighter
- Heinkel HD 38 fighter
- Heinkel HD 55 reconnaissance flying boat
- Heinkel He 42 trainer
- Heinkel He 45 light bomber
- Heinkel He 46 army co-operation/reconnaissance
- Heinkel He 50 dive bomber
- Heinkel He 51 fighter
- Heinkel He 59 torpedo bomber/reconnaissance floatplane
- Heinkel He 60 shipboard reconnaissance floatplane
- Heinkel He 70 transport/bomber
- Heinkel He 72 trainer
- Heinkel He 111 bomber/transport
- Heinkel He 112/A7He fighter
- Heinkel He 114 reconnaissance floatplane
- Heinkel He 116 long range transport
- Heinkel He 118 dive bomber
- Henschel Hs 123 dive bomber
- Henschel Hs 126 observation
- Junkers A 20 fighter
- Junkers A 35 trainer
- Junkers A 48/K 47 trainer/dive bomber
- Junkers F.13 transport/trainer
- Junkers Ju 52 transport
- Junkers Ju 86 bomber/transport
- Junkers Ju 87 dive bomber
- Junkers Ju 90 transport
- Junkers K 30 bomber
- Junkers K 37 bomber/reconnaissance
- Junkers T.21 reconnaissance
- Junkers W.34/K 43 transport
- Klemm Kl 25 trainer
- Klemm Kl 35 trainer
- Messerschmitt Bf 108 trainer
- Messerschmitt Bf 109 fighter
- Messerschmitt Bf 110 heavy fighter
- Messerschmitt Bf 161 reconnaissance
- Rohrbach Roland transport/trainer
- Siebel Fh 104 transport
- Udet U 12 trainer

=== Hungary ===
- Weiss WM-10 Ölyv trainer
- Weiss WM-16 reconnaissance/bomber
- Weiss WM-21 Sólyom reconnaissance/bomber

=== Italy ===
- Ansaldo A.120 reconnaissance
- Breda A.4 trainer
- Breda A.7 reconnaissance
- Breda A.9 trainer
- Breda Ba.25 trainer
- Breda Ba.27 fighter
- Breda Ba.64 ground-attack/light bomber
- Breda Ba.65 ground-attack/light bomber
- Breda Ba.88 ground-attack/light bomber
- CANT 25 flying boat fighter
- CANT Z.501 reconnaissance flying boat
- CANT Z.506 transport floatplane
- CANT Z.1007 bomber
- Caproni Ca.73 transport/bomber
- Caproni Ca.100 trainer
- Caproni Ca.101 transport/bomber
- Caproni Ca.111 reconnaissance bomber
- Caproni Ca.113 trainer
- Caproni Ca.114 fighter
- Caproni Ca.133 transport/bomber
- Caproni Ca.135 medium bomber
- Caproni Ca.164 trainer
- Caproni A.P.1 attack/light bomber
- Caproni Ca.310 reconnaissance bomber
- Fiat R.2 reconnaissance
- Fiat B.R. bomber
- Fiat BR.20 Cicogna bomber
- Fiat CR.1 fighter
- Fiat CR.20 fighter
- Fiat CR.30 fighter
- Fiat CR.32 fighter
- Fiat CR.42 fighter
- Fiat RS.14 maritime reconnaissance floatplane
- IMAM Ro.30 observation
- IMAM Ro.37 reconnaissance
- IMAM Ro.41 fighter
- IMAM Ro.43 reconnaissance floatplane
- IMAM Ro.44 floatplane fighter
- Macchi M.14 fighter
- Macchi M.15 reconnaissance bomber/trainer
- Macchi M.18 flying boat bomber
- Macchi M.24 flying boat bomber
- Macchi M.41 bis flying boat fighter
- Macchi M.71 flying boat fighter
- Nardi FN.305 liaison/trainer
- Nardi FN.315 trainer
- Piaggio P.6 reconnaissance floatplane
- Piaggio P.10 reconnaissance floatplane
- Piaggio P.32 bomber
- Savoia-Marchetti S.55 flying boat transport/bomber/record aircraft
- Savoia-Marchetti S.57 reconnaissance flying boat
- Savoia-Marchetti S.59 reconnaissance bomber flying boat
- Savoia-Marchetti SM.62 maritime reconnaissance flying boat
- Savoia-Marchetti S.72 bomber/transport
- Savoia-Marchetti SM.78 reconnaissance bomber flying boat
- Savoia-Marchetti SM.79 bomber
- Savoia-Marchetti SM.81 bomber/transport
- SIAI S.16 reconnaissance bomber flying boat
- SIAI S.67 flying boat fighter

=== Japan ===
- Aichi D1A carrier-based dive bomber
- Aichi E3A reconnaissance floatplane
- Aichi E10A reconnaissance seaplane
- Hiro H1H maritime reconnaissance bomber flying boat
- Hiro H2H maritime reconnaissance bomber flying boat
- Hiro H4H maritime reconnaissance bomber flying boat
- Hiro G2H long-range reconnaissance bomber
- Kawanishi E7K reconnaissance floatplane
- Kawanishi H3K maritime reconnaissance bomber flying boat
- Kawasaki Army Type 88 reconnaissance
- Kawasaki Army Type 92 fighter
- Kawasaki Ka 87 night bomber
- Kawasaki Ki-3 light bomber
- Kawasaki Ki-10 fighter
- Kawasaki Ki-32 light bomber
- Mitsubishi 1MF carrier-based fighter
- Mitsubishi 1MT torpedo bomber
- Mitsubishi 2MB1 light bomber
- Mitsubishi A5M carrier-based fighter
- Mitsubishi B1M carrier-based bomber
- Mitsubishi B5M carrier-based bomber
- Mitsubishi F1M reconnaissance float plane
- Mitsubishi G3M heavy bomber
- Mitsubishi K3M trainer
- Mitsubishi Ki-1 heavy bomber
- Mitsubishi Ki-2 heavy bomber
- Mitsubishi Ki-15 light reconnaissance bomber
- Mitsubishi Ki-20 heavy bomber
- Mitsubishi Ki-21 heavy bomber
- Mitsubishi Ki-30 light bomber
- Nakajima A1N carrier-based fighter
- Nakajima A2N carrier-based fighter
- Nakajima B5N torpedo bomber
- Nakajima E2N reconnaissance floatplane
- Nakajima E4N reconnaissance floatplane
- Nakajima E8N reconnaissance floatplane
- Nakajima Type 91 fighter
- Nakajima Ki-4 reconnaissance
- Nakajima Ki-6 transport
- Nakajima Ki-27 fighter
- Nakajima Ki-34 light transport
- Tachikawa Ki-9 trainer
- Tachikawa Ki-17 trainer
- Tachikawa Ki-36 army cooperation
- Yokosuka B3Y carrier-based torpedo bomber
- Yokosuka B4Y carrier-based bomber
- Yokosuka E1Y reconnaissance floatplane
- Yokosuka E5Y reconnaissance floatplane
- Yokosuka H5Y maritime reconnaissance bomber flying boat
- Yokosuka K4Y floatplane trainer
- Yokosuka K5Y trainer
- Yokosuka Ro-go Ko-gata reconnaissance floatplane

=== Latvia ===
- VEF I-12 trainer
- VEF I-14 sport
- VEF I-15 trainer
- VEF I-16 fighter
- VEF I-17 trainer

=== Lithuania ===
- Dobi-II reconnaissance
- ANBO III trainer
- ANBO IV reconnaissance/light bomber
- ANBO 41 reconnaissance/light bomber
- ANBO V trainer
- ANBO 51 trainer
- ANBO VI trainer/liaison
- ANBO VIII bomber

=== Netherlands ===
- Fokker C.I reconnaissance
- Fokker C.IV reconnaissance
- Fokker C.V light reconnaissance bomber
- Fokker C.VIIW reconnaissance floatplane
- Fokker C.Xlight bomber
- Fokker C.XIW
- Fokker D.X fighter
- Fokker D.XI fighter
- Fokker D.XIII fighter
- Fokker D.XVI fighter
- Fokker D.XVII fighter
- Fokker D.XXI fighter
- Fokker F.VII transport
- Fokker F.IX bomber
- Fokker S.II trainer
- Fokker S.III trainer
- Fokker S.IV trainer
- Fokker S.IX trainer
- Fokker T.IV torpedo bomber
- Fokker T.V torpedo bomber
- Koolhoven F.K.51 trainer
- Koolhoven F.K.56 trainer
- NVI F.K.31 fighter

=== Norway ===
- Marinens Flyvebaatfabrikk M.F.4 floatplane trainer
- Marinens Flyvebaatfabrikk M.F.5 maritime reconnaissance floatplane
- Marinens Flyvebaatfabrikk M.F.6 floatplane trainer
- Marinens Flyvebaatfabrikk M.F.7 floatplane trainer
- Marinens Flyvebaatfabrikk M.F.8 floatplane trainer
- Marinens Flyvebaatfabrikk M.F.9 floatplane fighter
- Marinens Flyvebaatfabrikk M.F.11 maritime reconnaissance floatplane

=== Poland ===
- Lublin R-VIII reconnaissance bomber
- Lublin R-XIII army-cooperation
- PWS-5 liaison aircraft
- PWS-10 fighter
- PWS-14 trainer
- PWS-16 trainer
- PWS-26 advanced trainer
- PZL P.7 fighter
- PZL P.11 fighter
- PZL.23 Karaś light bomber/reconnaissance
- PZL P.24 fighter
- PZL.37 Łoś medium bomber
- RWD 8 trainer
- RWD-14 Czapla army-cooperation

=== Romania ===
- IAR 14 fighter-trainer
- IAR 37 light reconnaissance bomber
- SET 3 trainer
- SET 7 trainer/reconnaissance

=== Siam (Thailand) ===
- Boripatra bomber

=== Spain ===
- AME VI reconnaissance and light attack
- CASA III trainer
- González Gil-Pazó GP-1 trainer
- Hispano E-30 intermediate trainer
- Hispano HS-34 basic trainer
- Loring R-I reconnaissance and light attack
- Loring R-III reconnaissance and light attack

=== Sweden ===
- FVM J.23 fighter
- Sparmann P1 advanced trainer
- Svenska Aero Jaktfalken fighter

=== Switzerland ===
- EKW C-35 reconnaissance
- Häfeli DH-5 reconnaissance

=== USSR ===
- Beriev Be-2 reconnaissance floatplane
- Beriev MBR-2 reconnaissance flying boat
- Bolkhovitinov DB-A bomber
- Grigorovich I-2 fighter
- Grigorovich I-Z fighter
- Grigorovich IP-1 fighter
- Kharkiv KhAI-5/Neman R-10 light reconnaissance bomber
- Polikarpov I-3 fighter
- Polikarpov I-5 fighter
- Polikarpov I-15 fighter
- Polikarpov I-153 fighter
- Polikarpov I-16 fighter
- Polikarpov P-2 trainer
- Polikarpov Po-2 trainer
- Polikarpov R-5 light reconnaissance bomber
- Polikarpov R-Z light reconnaissance bomber
- Shavrov Sh-2 small amphibian
- Tupolev ANT-3 reconnaissance
- Tupolev ANT-7 bomber/reconnaissance/transport
- Tupolev ANT-20 8 engine transport
- Tupolev I-4 fighter
- Tupolev TB-1 bomber
- Tupolev TB-3 bomber
- Tupolev SB bomber
- Yakovlev UT-1 trainer
- Yakovlev UT-2 trainer

=== United Kingdom ===
- Airspeed Oxford trainer
- Armstrong Whitworth A.W.16 fighter, evaluated by UK but only sales were to Nationalist Chinese
- Armstrong Whitworth Atlas army co-operation
- Armstrong Whitworth Scimitar fighter
- Armstrong Whitworth Siskin fighter
- Armstrong Whitworth Whitley bomber
- Avro 504N trainer
- Avro 549 Aldershot bomber
- Avro Anson bomber/trainer
- Avro Bison fleet spotter/reconnaissance
- Avro 621 Tutor trainer
- Avro 626 Prefect trainer
- Avro 643 Cadet trainer
- Blackburn F.1 Turcock fighter
- Blackburn F.2 Lincock fighter
- Blackburn F.3 fighter
- Blackburn 2F.1 Nautilus fighter
- Blackburn R.1 Blackburn spotter/reconnaissance
- Blackburn R.2 Airedale reconnaissance
- Blackburn R.B.1 Iris maritime patrol flying boat
- Blackburn R.B.2 Sydney maritime patrol flying boat
- Blackburn R.B.3 Perth maritime patrol flying boat
- Blackburn T.1 Swift torpedo bomber floatplane
- Blackburn T.2 Dart torpedo bomber
- Blackburn T.3 Velos bomber floatplane
- Blackburn T.4 Cubaroo torpedo bomber
- Blackburn T.5 Ripon reconnaissance/torpedo bomber
- Blackburn T.7B bomber/reconnaissance
- Blackburn T.8 Baffin torpedo bomber
- Blackburn T.9 Shark torpedo bomber
- Blackburn B-2 trainer
- Blackburn B-3 M.1/30 torpedo bomber
- Blackburn Baffin torpedo bomber
- Blackburn B-6 Shark torpedo bomber
- Blackburn Skua fighter/dive bomber
- Blackburn Roc fighter/dive bomber
- Boulton Paul Sidestrand bomber
- Boulton Paul Overstrand bomber
- Bristol Blenheim bomber
- Bristol Bombay bomber/transport
- Bristol Bulldog fighter
- Bristol F.2B Mk.IV Fighter fighter
- Fairey III.F reconnaissance
- Fairey Battle bomber
- Fairey Fawn bomber
- Fairey Firefly II fighter
- Fairey Flycatcher fighter
- Fairey Fox fighter
- Fairey Gordon light bomber
- Fairey Hendon bomber
- Fairey Seafox reconnaissance floatplane
- Fairey Seal fleet spotter/reconnaissance
- Fairey Swordfish torpedo bomber
- Gloster Gamecock fighter
- Gloster Gauntlet fighter
- Gloster Gladiator fighter
- Gloster Grebe fighter
- Gloster Nightjar fighter
- Gloster Sparrowhawk fighter
- Handley Page Hampden bomber
- Handley Page Harrow bomber/transport
- Handley Page Heyford bomber
- Handley Page Hyderabad bomber
- Handley Page Hinaidi bomber
- Hawker Fury fighter
- Hawker Hart light bomber
- Hawker Hind light bomber
- Hawker Horsley bomber
- Hawker Hurricane fighter
- Hawker Nimrod fighter
- Hawker Woodcock fighter
- Saro London maritime reconnaissance seaplane
- Short Rangoon maritime reconnaissance seaplane
- Short Singapore maritime reconnaissance seaplane
- Short Sunderland maritime reconnaissance seaplane
- Supermarine Scapa maritime reconnaissance seaplane
- Supermarine Seagull
- Supermarine Southampton maritime reconnaissance seaplane
- Supermarine Spitfire fighter
- Supermarine Stranraer maritime reconnaissance seaplane
- Supermarine Walrus spotter and reconnaissance amphibian
- Vickers Valentia transport
- Vickers Valparaiso light bomber
- Vickers Vernon transport
- Vickers Victoria transport
- Vickers Viking utility amphibian
- Vickers Vildebeest/Vincent army cooperation and torpedo bomber
- Vickers Vimy heavy bomber
- Vickers Virginia heavy bomber
- Vickers Vixen fighter/bomber
- Vickers Wellesley bomber
- Vickers Wellington bomber
- Westland Lysander army co-operation
- Westland Wallace army co-operation
- Westland Walrus fleet spotter/reconnaissance
- Westland Wapiti army co-operation

=== United States ===
- Beechcraft Model 18 transport & trainer
- Berliner-Joyce F2J carrier-based fighter
- Berliner-Joyce OJ observation
- Berliner-Joyce P-16 fighter
- Boeing B-17 heavy bomber
- Boeing XB-15 heavy bomber
- Boeing FB/PW-9 fighter/carrier-based fighter
- Boeing F2B carrier-based fighter
- Boeing F3B carrier-based fighter
- Boeing F4B fighter/carrier-based fighter
- Boeing NB trainer
- Boeing P-12 fighter
- Boeing P-26 Peashooter fighter
- Consolidated O-17 Courier observation
- Consolidated P-30 fighter
- Consolidated P2Y patrol flying boat
- Consolidated PBY Catalina patrol flying boat
- Consolidated PT-1 trainer
- Consolidated PT-11 trainer
- Curtiss A-8 light bomber
- Curtiss A-12 Shrike light bomber
- Curtiss BF2C Goshawk carrier-based fighter-bomber
- Curtiss F5L patrol flying boat
- Curtiss F6C Hawk carrier-based fighter
- Curtiss F7C Seahawk carrier-based fighter
- Curtiss F9C Sparrowhawk carrier-based fighter
- Curtiss F11C Goshawk carrier-based fighter/fighter-bomber
- Curtiss Falcon observation/bomber/fighter-bomber
- Curtiss Fledgling trainer
- Curtiss P-1 Hawk fighter
- Curtiss P-6 Hawk fighter
- Curtiss P-36 Hawk fighter
- Curtiss SBC Helldiver carrier-based dive bomber
- Curtiss SOC Seagull observation
- De Havilland USD-4 bomber
- Douglas B-18 Bolo heavy bomber
- Douglas C-1 transport
- Douglas Dolphin utility/transport amphibian
- Douglas DT torpedo bomber
- Douglas O-2 observation
- Douglas O-35 observation/bomber
- Douglas O-38 observation
- Douglas O-43 observation
- Douglas O-46 observation
- Douglas T2D torpedo bomber
- Douglas TBD Devastator torpedo bomber
- Fokker PW-5 fighter/trainer
- General Aviation PJ air-sea rescue flying boat
- Great Lakes BG carrier-based dive bomber
- Grumman FF fighter
- Grumman F2F fighter
- Grumman F3F fighter
- Grumman Goose utility flying boat
- Grumman JF Duck utility amphibian
- Grumman J2F Duck utility amphibian
- Hall PH patrol flying boat
- Huff-Daland TW-5 trainer
- Huff-Daland LB-1 light bomber
- Keystone B-3 bomber
- Keystone B-4 bomber
- Keystone B-5 bomber
- Keystone B-6 bomber
- Keystone LB-5 light bomber
- Keystone LB-6/LB-7 light bomber
- Loening OL amphibious observation
- Lockheed Model 212 transport/bomber
- Martin B-10 bomber
- Martin BM bomber
- Martin NBS-1 night bomber
- Martin T3M torpedo bomber
- Martin T4M torpedo bomber
- Martin MO observation
- Naval Aircraft Factory N3N Canary trainer
- Naval Aircraft Factory PN patrol seaplane
- Naval Aircraft Factory TS fighter
- North American BT-9 trainer
- North American BT-14 trainer
- North American NA-16 trainer
- North American O-47 observation
- Northrop A-17 light bomber
- Northrop BT dive bomber
- Northrop Delta transport/patrol
- Orenco D fighter
- Packard-Le Peré LUSAC-11 observation
- Seversky P-35 fighter
- Stearman 75 trainer
- Stearman 76 armed trainer
- Thomas-Morse MB-3 fighter
- Thomas-Morse O-19 observation
- Verville-Sperry M-1 Messenger communications
- Verville-Packard R-1 racer
- Verville-Sperry R-3 racer
- Vought FU fighter
- Vought O2U Corsair observation
- Vought SBU Corsair carrier-based fighter/dive bomber
- Vought SB2U Vindicator carrier-based dive bomber
- Vought VE-7 trainer
- Vultee V-1 transport/bomber
- Waco Custom Cabin Series light transport
- Waco Standard Cabin series light transport
- Waco D Series observation/bomber
- Waco F series trainer

=== Yugoslavia ===
- Ikarus ŠM flying boat trainer
- Ikarus IK 2 fighter
- Ikarus IO reconnaissance flying boat
