= SPCA 30 =

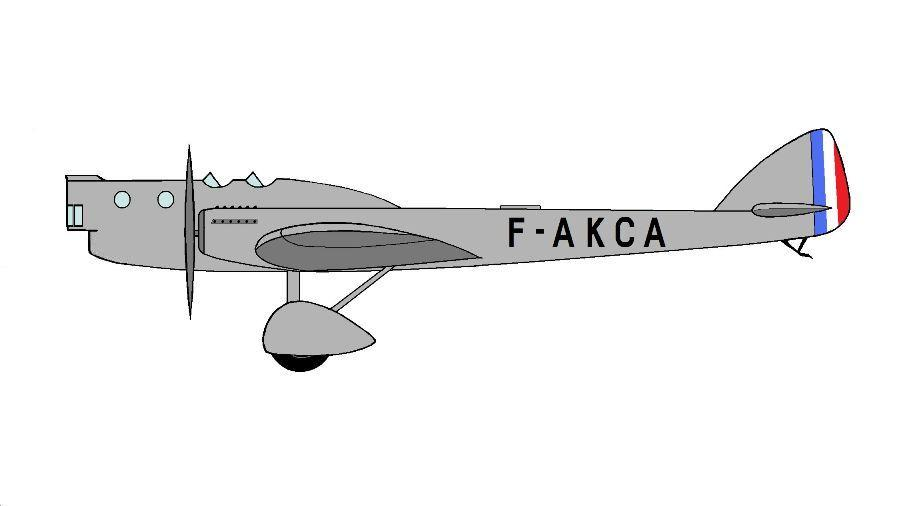
- SPCA 30 with the original landing gear

General information
- Type: Bomber monoplane
- National origin: France
- Manufacturer: Société Provençale de Constructions Aéronautiques (SPCA)
- Number built: 2

History
- First flight: 1931

The SPCA 30, also known as SPCA Type III, was a bomber aircraft designed and produced by the French aircraft manufacturer Société Provençale de Constructions Aéronautiques (SPCA).

== Development and design ==
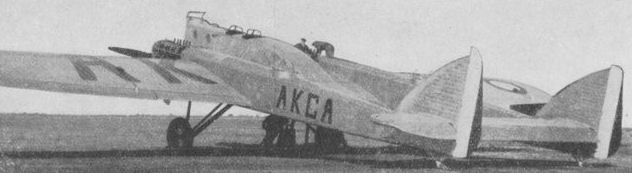
SPCA III photo from L'Aerophile February 1931

During 1928, the French Service Technique de l'Aéronautique (the government body responsible for producing specifications for aircraft for the French armed forces) drew up requirements for a four-seat Multiplace de Combat, a multi-role aircraft capable of day and night bombing, reconnaissance and long–range escort duties. In response, SPCA designed an all-metal twin boom low wing monoplane, the SPCA 30, the only twin boom aircraft entered into the contest. The aircraft's central fuselage had two open cockpits offset to port, and a machine gun mount in the nose, while two more machine gun mounts were in the tailbooms. This arrangement of its firing stations, which left no field uncovered by defensive fire, was intended to permit the aircraft to effectively defend itself from would-be attackers. In particular, the effectiveness of its downwards firing arcs was bolstered by the narrowness of the fuselages.

The SPCA 30 employed all-metal construction, which enabled it to fly under virtually all weather conditions. Many elements of the aircraft were designed to be readily demountable and, where feasible to do so, interchangeable; this eased maintenance and repair tasks. When configured for this role, it could be fully equipped to function as a day or night bomber. It was even envisioned for use as a heavy fighter, for which it was intended to escort bombardment squadrons and carry out aerial observation. One of the more unusual features of the SPCA 30 was the ability to install and remove a detachable cabin from the underside of the fuselage. While the aircraft was on the ground, the cabin was to be detached and towed away by a tractor. It was suggested that this function would be useful in the air ambulance role.

The aircraft was furnished with a cantilever wing that comprised three separate sections, all of which were demountable. Specifically, there was a central section of uniform section that supported the cabin, fuselages, engine bearers, and landing gear; the central section was joined to the two lateral sections via a total of four bolts each. The wing covering was composed wholly of corrugated sheet metal and was reinforced internally using additional metal sections. Multiple panels across this covering were attached using screws that permitted rapid removal for ease of inspection of elements within the wing’s interior, such as the supports for the flight controls.

The wing’s structural elements comprised a pair of lattice girder spars which had a uniform height across the central section but progressively tapered in the lateral section. Each spar flange consisted of a pair of continuous semi-cylindrical duralumin plates and a U-shaped member that was riveted together as to form an almost circular cross section. These flanges tapered uniformly across the lateral wing sections so that they formed elongated cones. The spar webs were formed by box cross section lattices. The covering of the wing was supported directly by the ribs, which conformed to a lattice girder style. Rigid triangular bracing in the planes of the upper and lower spar flanges, the bracing members being extruded in the form of omega. The ailerons were hinged to auxiliary lattice spars.

The central portion of the wing was attached to the two fuselages by no more than four bolts each. The framework of each fuselage consisted of a pair of triangularly-braced girders that joined at intervals to transverse frames. The fuselage covering was smooth sheet metal. Both the floor and ceiling of the fuselages were reinforced using stringers that ran throughout their whole length. Each fuselage contained a central corridor that connected the machine gun station, the engine compartment and the central cabin.

The central cabin was extended by a balcony that projected roughly 13 foot in front of the wing, it shared a similar structure to that of the fuselages. It had a continuous floor that was interrupted by a trapdoor (used for access) as well as a series of other openings that were used either by the navigator or the aerial observer. The cabin was divided lengthwise into two separates compartments by a partition with a connecting door. The forward compartment accommodated for the chief observer, being furnished with all of the requisite instruments for navigation, observation, and bombardment, as well as a single ring mount for a machine gun. The aft compartment contained the two pilot stations, which were arranged in tandem and provided with dual flight control and supported by a pair of raised girders. Each station could be disconnected by the pilot of the other station. The flight controls were rigid and are mounted on ball bearings. The supporting frame for the bomb rack was positioned between the spars of the central part of the wing within the lowest point of the aft compartment; this frame was also able to function as a camera support during photographic missions.

The horizontal stabilizer connected the two fuselages with an overhang at each end. The elevator was mounted on ball bearings. The vertical empennage comprised a fin and a rudder at the tail of each fuselage. Both the horizontal stabilizer and vertical empennage shared an identical structure to that the wing.

The landing gear was composed of two independent symmetrical parts, each being fitted with a special steel axle, a tube of variable thickness attached by a ball-and-socket joint to the lower flange of the front spar of the central section of the wing under the side of the cabin. An oblique fore-and-aft steel strut was attached to the lower flange of the rear wing spar under the centre of each fuselage. A vertical strut provided with a Messier-supplied oleo-pneumatic shock absorber was attached to the lower flange of the front spar beneath the centre of the engine bearer. The lower ends of these three members were joined to form a trihedral; at the apex of this trihedral and constituting the end of the axle, there was a spindle that carried a wheel. Each fuselage carried a swivelling tail skid that was furnished with a Messier oleo-pneumatic shock absorber.

Fuel was housed within a pair of protected drop fuel tanks, composed of L2R alloy, that were located inside the central part of the wings, one on either side of the cabin. The fuel system enables each engine to be supplier from either or both of these tanks. Dependent on the engine used, radiators fitted were either of the frontal honeycomb style or retractable plate-type radiators located in the leading edge of the wing.

== Prototypes and into flight ==
During late 1930, a pair of prototypes were completed. The first one, registration F-AKCA was powered by a pair of 485 kW (650 hp) Lorraine-Dietrich 18Kd water-cooled W engines engines, and made its first flight on 1 February 1931. On 7 August, F-AKCA was being demonstrated at Villacoublay airfield when the aircraft suffered severe vibration when the engines were brought back to full power, with the tailbooms being displaced by more than a metre, leading to tearing of the skin of the aircraft's tailbooms. Despite the damage, the pilot managed to land the aircraft. The accident was eventually found to be due to flutter, caused by weakness of the wings in torsion (i.e. twisting), which was exacerbated by the unbalanced control surfaces. The second prototype, F-AKCB, with two 650 hp Hispano-Suiza 12Nb engines, flew on 6 May 1933. The original bulky landing gear was later replaced by a lighter one.

The SPCA 30, together with other competing aircraft such as the Blériot 137 and the Breguet 410, were rejected in favour of Amiot's proposal, the Amiot 140, which later entered production as a five-seat night bomber, the Amiot 143.

== Specifications ==
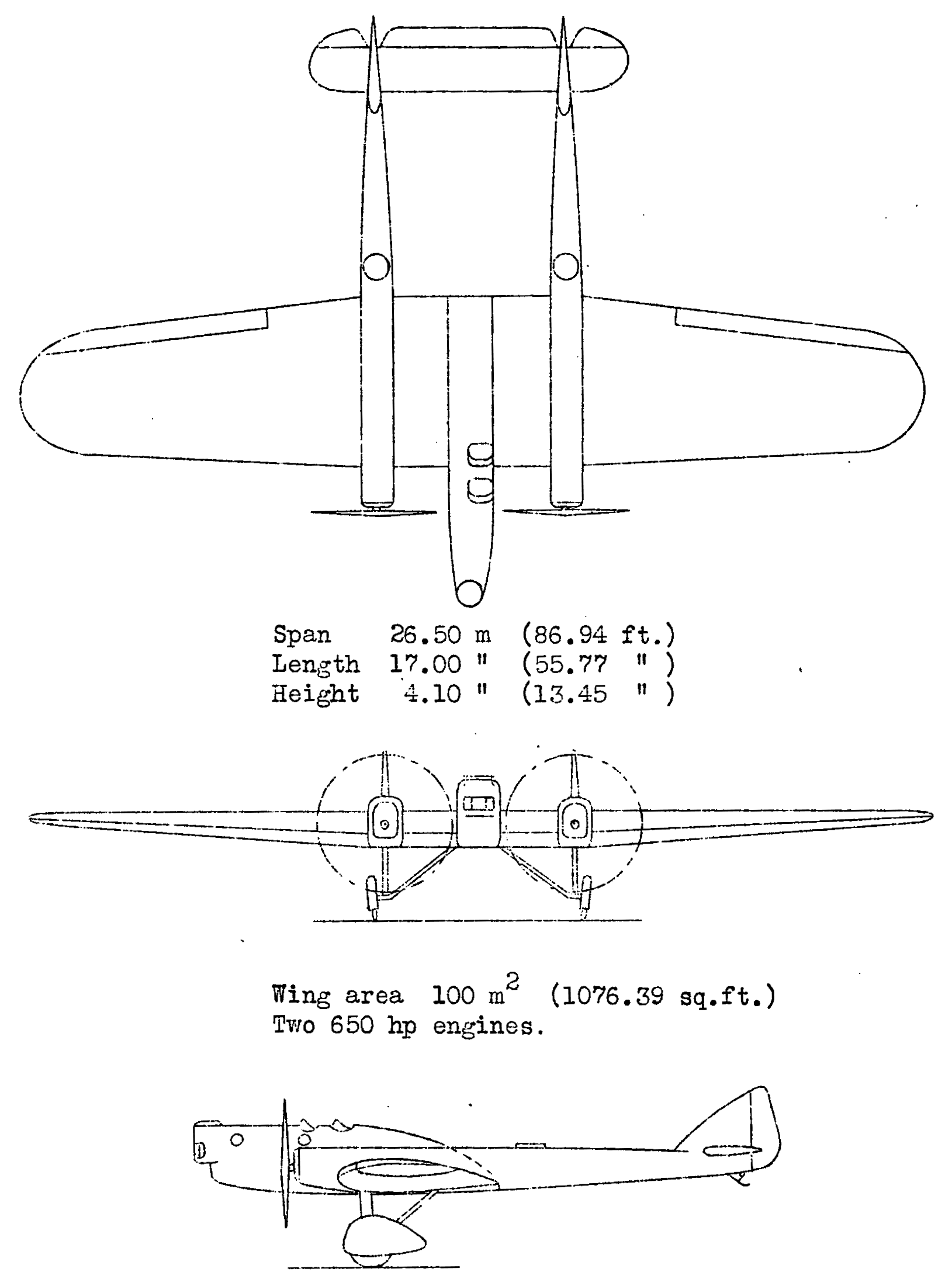
SPCA 30 M4 3-view drawing from NACA-AC-171

Data from Parmentier, National Advisory Committee for Aeronautics

General characteristics

- Crew: four
- Length: 17 m (55 ft 9 in)
- Wingspan: 26.5 m (86 ft 11 in)
- Height: 4.10 m (13 ft 5 in)
- Wing area: 100 m^{2} (1,100 sq ft)
- Empty weight: 1,750 kg (3,858 lb)
- Gross weight: 6,500 kg (14,330 lb)
- Powerplant: 2 × Lorraine-Dietrich 18Kd W-18 water-cooled piston engines, 480 kW (650 hp) each

Performance

- Maximum speed: 255 km/h (158 mph, 138 kn)
- Range: 650 km (400 mi, 350 nmi)
- Service ceiling: 7,500 m (24,600 ft)
- Time to altitude: 2,000 m (6,600 ft) in six minutes

== See also ==
Aircraft of comparable role, configuration, and era

- Amiot 143
- Blériot 137
- Breguet 410
- SAB AB-80

Related lists

- List of Interwar military aircraft
