= Bréguet 460 Vultur =

French aircraft

Bréguet 460
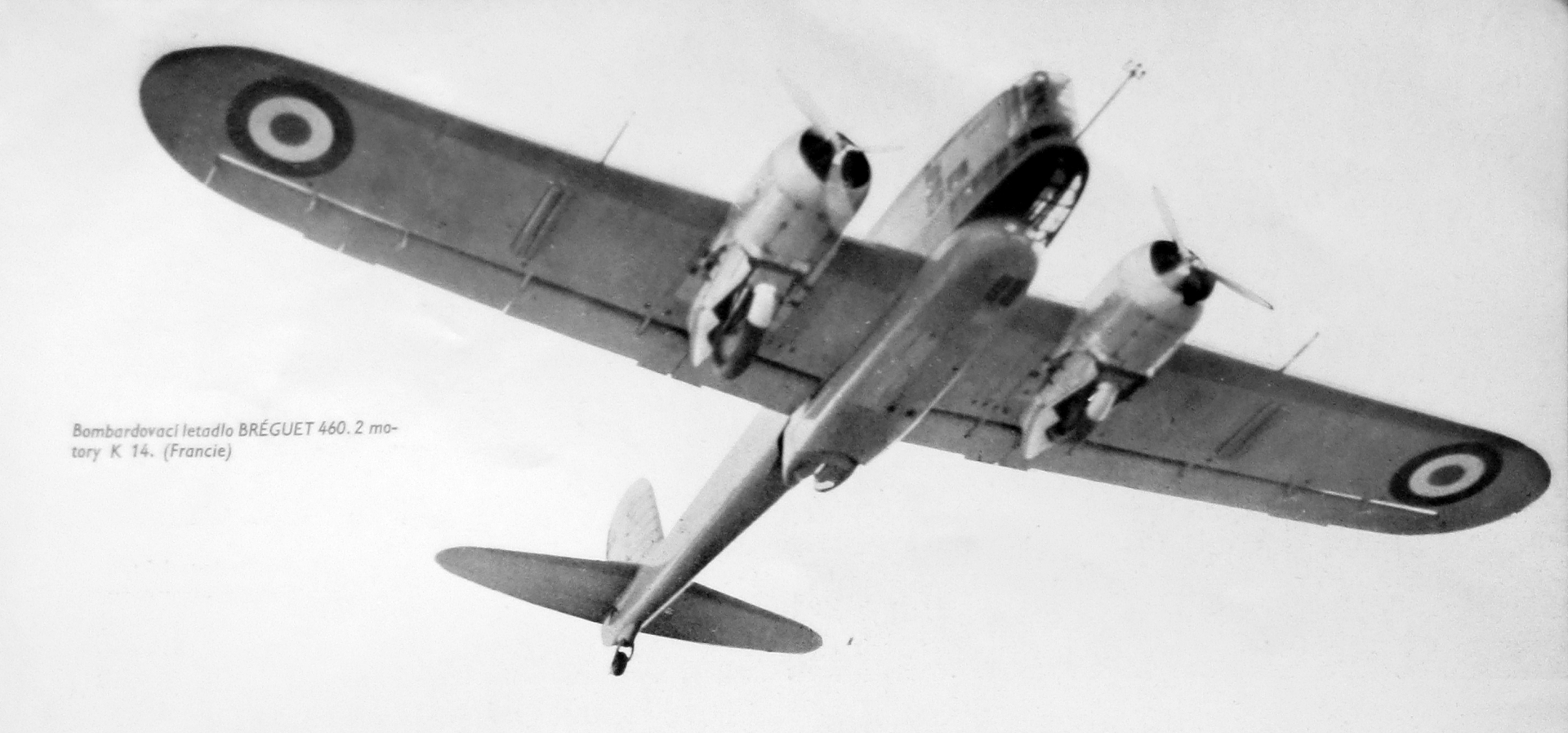

General information
- Type: Bomber aircraft
- National origin: France
- Manufacturer: Bréguet
- Number built: 3

History
- First flight: January 1935

The Bréguet 460 Vultur was a French bomber of the 1930s. Few of these twin-engined monoplanes and its variant, the Breguet 462 Bréguet, were built. At least one Breguet 460 was sold to the Spanish Republican Air Force during the Spanish Civil War.

== Development and design ==
Breguet 462

In August 1933, the French Air Ministry issued a requirement for a multi-purpose aircraft (BCR - Bombardement, Combat, Reconnaissance). A maximum speed of 350 km/h (190 kn; 220 mph) was required, with a combat radius of 600 km (320 nmi; 370 mi) carrying 1,000 kg (2,200 lb) of bombs. Breguet's design to meet this requirement, the Breguet 460, was a twin-engined monoplane of all metal construction, with a retractable tailwheel undercarriage. It was powered by two Gnome-Rhône 14K radial engines (originally 14 Kdrs rated at 825 hp (615 kW), which were later replaced by 900 hp (670 kW) Kirs/Kjrs engines). An enclosed cockpit, seating two pilots in tandem, was offset to the left, there were three positions for defensive 7.5 mm Darne machine guns, one in the nose, one ventral position (manned by the radio operator), and a dorsal position behind the cockpit. Up to 1,800 kg (4,000 lb) of bombs could be carried in a fuselage bomb bay and under the wings.

The prototype Breguet 460 made its first flight at Villacoublay in January 1935. Following initial testing, it was rebuilt with a longer rear fuselage and revised tail surfaces, flying again in April 1935. (The original rear fuselage from the Bre 460 was later fitted to the Breguet 414 to produce the Breguet 420.) The Breguet 460 was demonstrated to the Spanish Air Force at Madrid in early June, before returning to France for official testing. While relatively fast, with a maximum speed of 385 km/h (208 kn; 239 mph), the aircraft had poor handling and was prone to ground looping, and was rejected by the test pilots of the Service Technique de l'Aéronautique. Following this rejection, the Breguet 460 was again modified, with the engine nacelles lengthened and the tail surfaces revised. These changes improved the Breguet 460's handling, and it was now considered airworthy, but attracted no further interest from the French government, and the aircraft was stored. Following the outbreak of the Spanish Civil War, the Breguet 460 prototype was sold to the Spanish Republican Air Force in 1936.

In 1934, the French Air Ministry issued a new requirement for a four-seat fast bomber, required to reach a speed of 400 km/h (220 kn; 250 mph), and to meet this requirement, Breguet proposed the Breguet 462, a refined derivative of the Breguet 460. The Breguet 462, while structurally similar to the Bre 460, and incorporating the modifications made to the earlier aircraft as a result of testing, was more streamlined and was intended to be powered by more powerful (940 hp (700 kW) Gnome-Rhône 14N radial engines. However, these engines were not initially available, and when the first prototype was first flown in October 1936, it was powered by two Gnome-Rhône 14 Kirs/Jjrs engines, as used by the Bre 460. Defensive armament was three 7.5 mm MAC 1934 machine guns, mounted in nose, dorsal and ventral positions as in the Bre 460, although the nose and dorsal guns could be replaced by 20 mm Hispano-Suiza HS.404 cannon. Breguet claimed that a speed of about 480 km/h (260 kn; 300 mph) if 1,325 hp (988 kW) engines were fitted. The Breguet 462 was exhibited at the 1936 Paris Air Show, and as a result, the first prototype was purchased by Japan, and after removal of sensitive equipment, and replacement of the Gnome-Rhône 14 Kirs/Jjrs engines with older Kdrs engines (possibly the actual engines originally fitted to the Bre 460 prototype, it was shipped to Japan late in 1936.

The second prototype, powered by the intended Gnome-Rhône 14N engines, first flew on 23 February 1937. While the Breguet 462 was the first French bomber capable of speeds of 400 km/h, requirements had moved on, and the Air Ministry's plans were concentrated on the much faster Amiot 350 and Lioré et Olivier LeO 45. No further production of the Breguet bomber took place.

== Operational history ==
The Breguet 460 was flown to Barcelona on 20 November 1936. The sole Breguet 460 was assigned to Groupo 11 de Vuelo Nucturno (Night Flying Group 11) which fielded a mixed inventory of French types, including two Bloch MB.210s and two Potez 54s. The Breguet was used for Maritime patrol flights, piloted by Ramón Torres, who had made his name carrying out a series of civil long range flights prior to the outbreak of the war. On 7 March 1937, the Breguet 460 took off on a patrol over the Mediterranean, and later that day crashed into the sea near Barcelona, killing all aboard. The cause of the aircraft's loss was uncertain, although an aircraft trailing smoke flying at low level was spotted by Fishermen, and rumours circulated that the Breguet had been hit by anti-aircraft fire from the Nationalist cruiser Canarias.

Little is known of Japanese use of the first Breguet 462 after it arrived in Japan, although the aircraft appears to have been studied closely. The second prototype was purchased by the French government, and used as a test bed for the Gnome-Rhône 14N engines and as a platform for dropping parachutes.

== Variants ==
Bre 460 M5
Five-seat Multi-role aircraft, powered by Gnome-Rhône 14K engines. One prototype built.

Bre 462 B4
A modernized four-seat bomber derivative of Bre 460. Two built.

== Operators ==
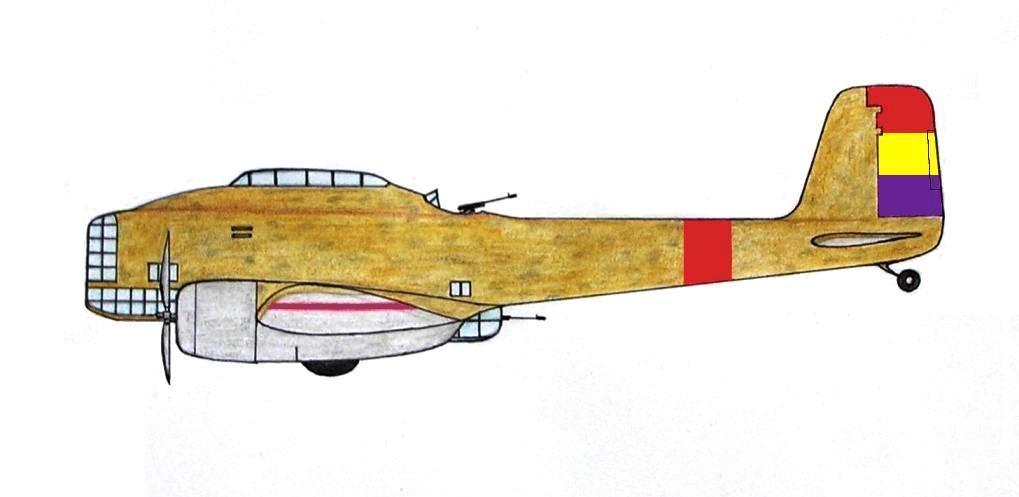
Breguet 460 Vultur of the Spanish Republican Air Force

France

- Armée de l'Air

Spain

- Spanish Republican Air Force

== Specifications (Bre 462 B4) ==
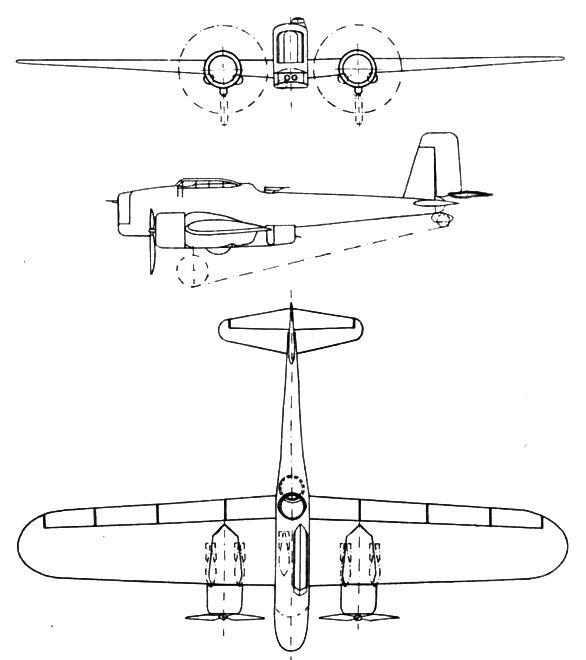
Breguet 460 3-view drawing from L'Aerophile March 1936

Data from Les multiplaces de combat Breguet 460/462 Vultur

General characteristics

- Crew: four
- Length: 14.825 m (48 ft 8 in)
- Wingspan: 20.55 m (67 ft 5 in)
- Height: 4.20 m (13 ft 9 in)
- Wing area: 56.91 m^{2} (612.6 sq ft)
- Empty weight: 4,350 kg (9,590 lb)
- Gross weight: 8,200 kg (18,078 lb)
- Powerplant: 2 × Gnome-Rhône 14N-0/N-1 14-cylinder air-cooled radial engine, 700 kW (940 hp) each

Performance

- Maximum speed: 402 km/h (250 mph, 217 kn) at 4,000 m (13,000 ft)
- Range: 2,000 km (1,200 mi, 1,100 nmi) with 1,000 kg (2,200 lb) bombs
- Service ceiling: 8,300 m (27,200 ft)
- Time to altitude: 9 min 15 s to 4,000 ft (1,200 m)

Armament

- Guns: 3 × 7.5 mm (0.295 in) MAC 1934 machine guns
- Bombs: 1,500 kg (3,300 lb)

== See also ==
Related development

- Breguet 470

Aircraft of comparable role, configuration, and era

- Amiot 140
- Bloch MB 130
- Potez 540

Related lists

- List of Interwar military aircraft
- List of aircraft of the Spanish Republican Air Force

== Bibliography ==
- Cortet, Pierre (December 2001). "Les multiplaces de combat Breguet 460/462 Vultur" [The Multi-seat Combat Aircraft Breguet 460/462 Vulture]. Avions: Toute l'Aéronautique et son histoire (in French). No. 105. pp. 45–49. ISSN 1243-8650.
- Cortet, Pierre (January 2002). "Les multiplaces de combat Breguet 460/462 Vultur". Avions: Toute l'Aéronautique et son histoire (in French). No. 106. pp. 47–55. ISSN 1243-8650.
- Cuny, Jean; Danel, Raymond (1986). Leo 45, Amiot 350, et autres B4. Collection Docavia (in French). Vol. 23. Paris: Éditions Larivière.
- Howson, Gerald (1999). Arms for Spain: The Untold Story of the Spanish Civil War. New York: St. Martin's Press. ISBN 0-312-24177-1.
- Lacaze, Henri (2016). Les avions Louis Breguet Paris [The Aircraft of Louis Breguet, Paris] (in French). Vol. 2: le règne du monoplan. Le Vigen, France. ISBN 978-2-914017-89-3.
- "Military Types at the Show". Flight. Vol. 30, no. 1456. 19 November 1936. pp. 542–549.
