= Amiot 143 =

French Medium Bomber

Amiot 140 family
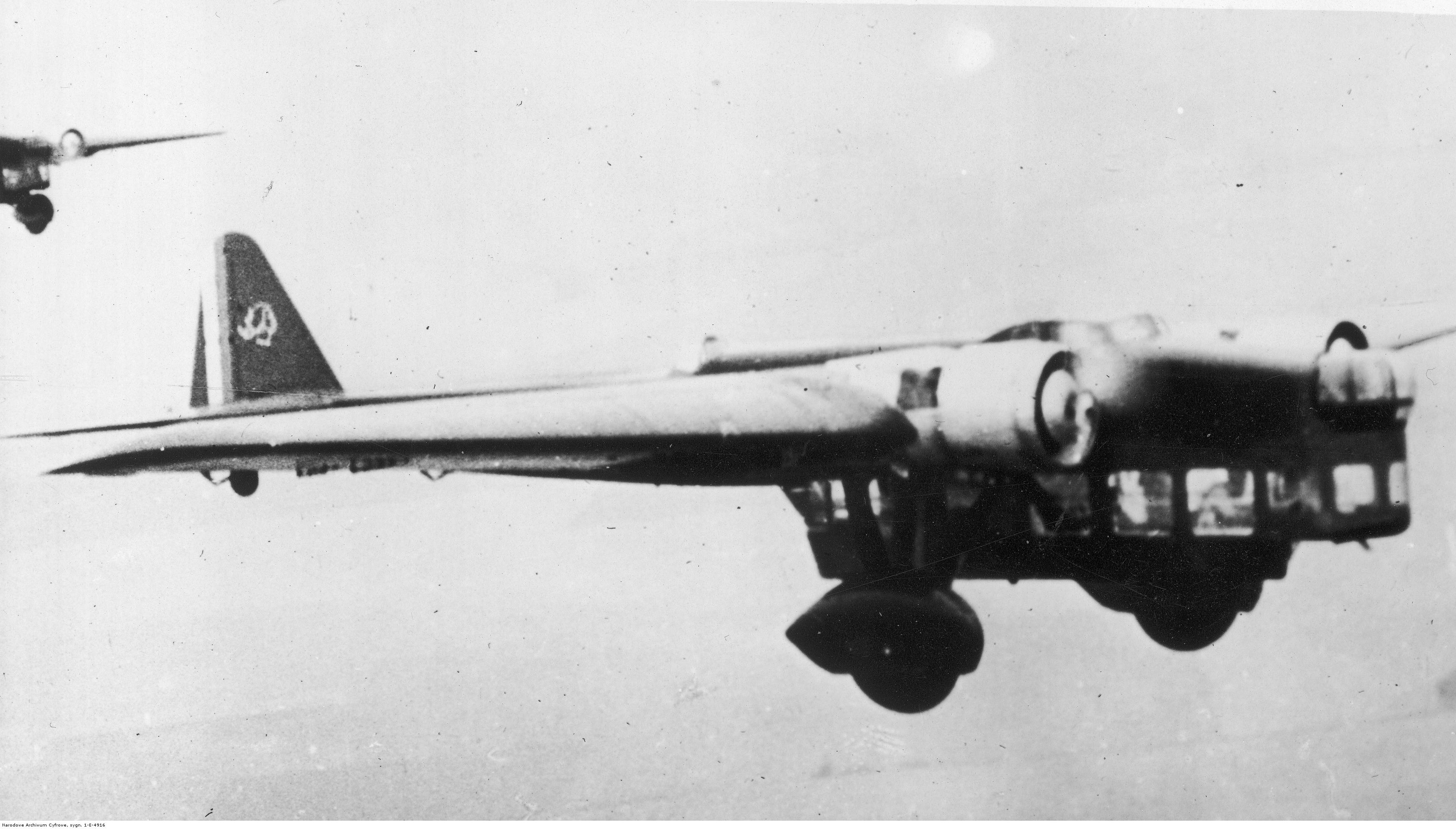

General information
- Type: Medium bomber
- Manufacturer: Avions Amiot
- Designer: Félix Amiot
- Primary user: French Air Force
- Number built: 138

History
- Manufactured: 1935-1937
- Introduction date: July 1935
- First flight: 12 April 1931
- Retired: 1944

The Amiot 143 (sometimes written as 143M or 143 M.5) was a 1930s French five-seat Multiplace de Combat (M.5) designed to meet 1928 specifications for a monoplane capable of day and night bombing, long-range reconnaissance and bomber escort.

== Design and development ==
In 1928, the French Air Ministry issued a specification for a four-seat Multiplace de Combat, a multi-seat combat aircraft to act as a light bomber, reconnaissance aircraft and long-range escort fighter. Amiot received an order for two prototype Amiot 140s, to be evaluated against the competing Bleriot 137, Breguet 410 and SPCA 30. The Amiot 140 was a high-winged cantilever monoplane of all-metal construction, with corrugated wing skinning and a fixed tail wheel undercarriage. The pilot sat in an open cockpit, with positions for gunners in the nose and dorsal positions. A glazed gondola under the forward fuselage carried a bombardier/gunner, ensuring that the gunners had a clear field of fire all around the aircraft. The Amiot was intended to be powered by two 515 kW (691 hp) Lorraine 18G Orion water-cooled W engines but these were unavailable and the first prototype was fitted with Hispano-Suiza 12Nbr engines to allow flight testing, making its maiden flight on 12 April 1931. The second prototype was completed in February 1932 but the continued unavailability of its intended engines, either the original Lorraine-Dietrichs or turbocharged Hispano-Suizas, meant that it never flew. Despite this, on 23 November 1933 an order was placed for 40 Amiot 140s, to be powered by 662 kW (888 hp) Lorraine 12Q Eider engines.

The French Air Ministry had meanwhile revised its requirements, concentrating on the bombing role and asking for better performance. Amiot redesigned the aircraft to meet these requirements and incorporate lessons learned during testing of the Amiot 140. The gondola under the fuselage was enlarged, allowing easier operation of the aircraft's guns and a radio-operator was added, bringing the crew to five. Manually operated gun turrets were provided in the nose and dorsal positions. Orders were placed for two prototypes, differing only in the engines fitted, with the Amiot 142 having Hispano-Suiza 12Y engines and the Amiot 143 having Gnome-Rhone 14K radial engines. The 143 flew first, on 1 August 1934, while the 142 didn't fly until January 1935. As it was decided to allocate the Hispano-Suiza engines to fighters, the Amiot 143 was selected, and the existing order for 40 Amiot 140s was converted to 143s.

The Amiot 143 had the same high-wing and fixed undercarriage as the Amiot 140, with the wing thick enough to allow crew access to the engines by a tunnel between the wing spars. The pilot sat in an enclosed cockpit, level with the leading edge of the wing and the navigator-bombardier, who was also provided with flying controls, sat in the extensively glazed gondola beneath the pilot. The radio operator sat towards the rear of the gondola and in early aircraft operated two 7.7 mm (0.303 in) Lewis guns. Nose and dorsal turrets, each carrying a Lewis gun, completed the defensive armament, while the gondola also housed an internal bomb-bay. After 40 aircraft had been completed, the design was revised, with the aircraft being fitted with a longer nose (increasing overall length from 17.94 to 18.24 m (58.9 to 59.8 ft), a revised fuel system and with the Lewis guns in the nose, dorsal turrets and ventral position each being replaced by single 7.5 mm (0.295 in) MAC 1934 machine guns, with a fourth gun for the navigator-bombardier firing through a hatch in the floor.

Deliveries of the design began in April 1935 and continued until March 1937, with a total of 138 being built. An improved version, the Amiot 144 was built to meet a 1933 requirement for a Multiplace de Combat, fitted with a retractable undercarriage. First flying on 18 January 1936, only one was built.

== Operational history ==
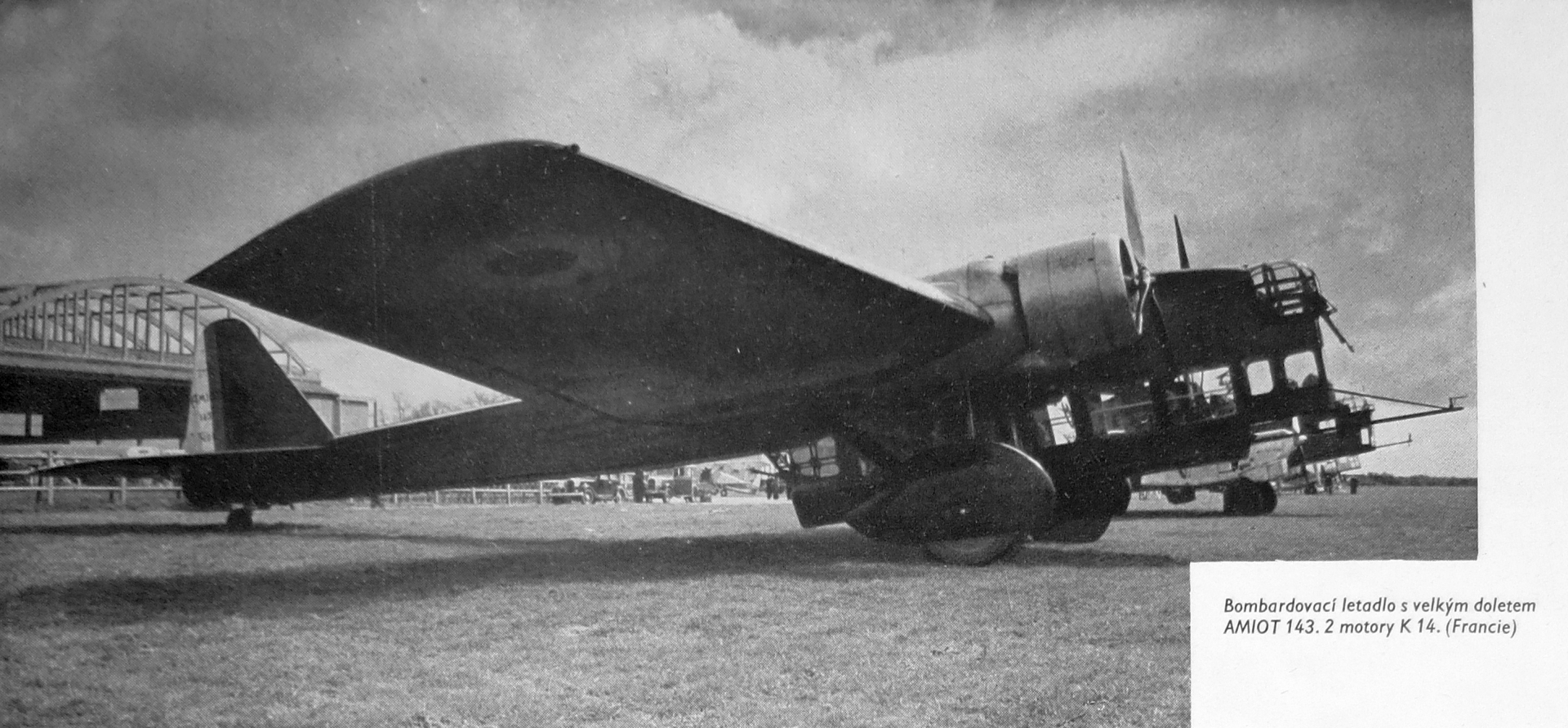
An Amiot 143 in 1938

The Amiot 143 entered service in July 1935, with deliveries continuing until 1938. Six were going to be delivered to the Spanish Republican Air Force during the Spanish Civil War. However, there is no evidence that these were delivered during the war. By the time the last deliveries were made in March 1938, the Amiot was obsolete and was already being replaced by more modern aircraft such as the Bloch MB.131. At the outbreak of the Second World War, Amiot 143s still equipped five groupes in Metropolitan France together with an African-based groupe.

During the Phoney War, Amiot 143 groupes carried out reconnaissance and leaflet raids over Germany. Eighty-seven Amiot 143s remained in front line service when the Battle of France began on 10 May 1940, of which 50 equipped four metropolitan groupes: GBs I/34 and II/34 in the north, GBs I/38 and II/38 in the East and 17 equipped one African groupe, GB II/63, which was in the process of re-equipping with Martin 167Fs. Following the start of the Battle of France, the Amiot 143 was mainly used in night attacks against German airfields and lines of communications, and experienced relatively low losses. An exception was a daylight raid by 10 Amiots from GBs I/34, II/34 and II/38 against German bridgeheads near Sedan on 14 May 1940. Despite having a fighter escort, two Amiots were shot down while a third force-landed before returning to base.

Fifty-two Amiot 143s were in the Unoccupied Zone and 25 were in French North Africa. They were reorganized into GBs I/38 and II/38 and were used until July 1941 when they were replaced by LeO 451 bombers. Some Amiots of II/38 served as transports for the French in Syria. This groupe later joined the Allies after their landings in Africa. The last Amiot 143 was retired from service in February 1944. A few Amiot 143 are reported to have been commandeered by the Germans and used as transports. Only 11 were left in the Unoccupied Zone when it was occupied by the Germans in 1943 and only three were airworthy. Had the war gone on a little longer for France, it is likely that all of the Amiot 143 would have become trainers, having been replaced by more modern bombers such as the LeO 451.

== Variants ==
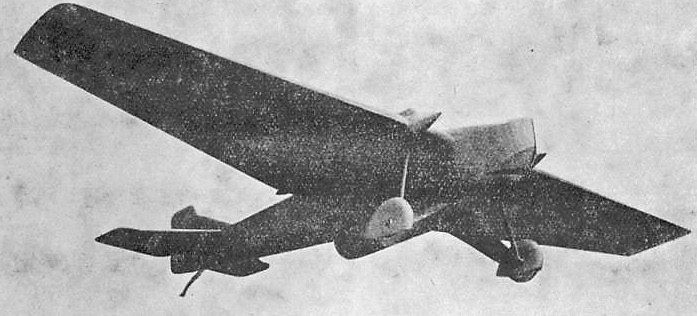
Amiot 140M photo from Annuaire de L'Aéronautique 1931

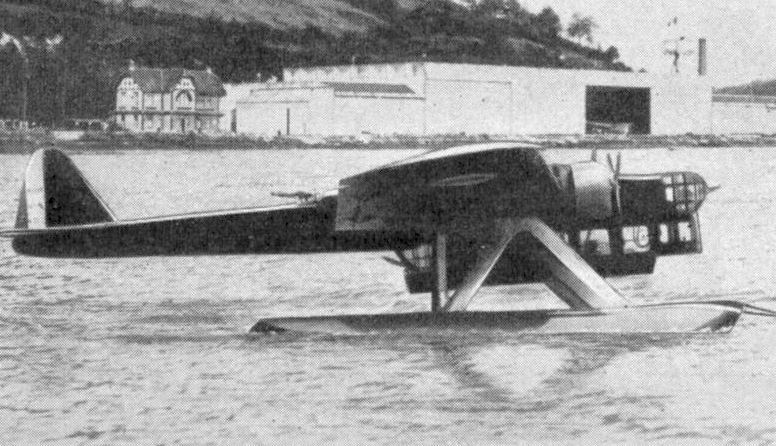
Amiot 150 photo from L'Aerophile July 1937

Amiot 140 M.4
Prototype with 2 x 485 kW (650 hp) Hispano-Suiza 12Nbr V-12 engines. Two built, of which only one flown, followed by orders for 40, to be powered by 2 x 662 kW (888 hp) Lorraine 12Q Eider W-12 engines, which were built as Amiot 143s. Optional M.5 suffix refers to bomber role, and seating for 4 crew.
Amiot 141
Powered by three 520 kW (700 hp) Lorraine-Dietrich 18G Orion W-18 water-cooled piston engines.
Amiot 142
prototype with 499 kW (669 hp) Hispano-Suiza 12Ybrs V-12 engines (1 built)
Amiot 143 M.5
production version with 649 kW (870 hp) Gnome-Rhône 14Kirs/14Kjrs (left and right hand rotation) radial engines (138 built, including 40 ordered as Amiot 140 and 25 ordered as Amiot 144)
Amiot 144
version with reduced wing area, flaps and retractable undercarriage and no front turret, powered by 2x 664 kW (890 hp) Gnome-Rhône 14Kirs/14Kjrs (left and right hand rotation) (1 built, orders for 25 produced as Amiot 143 instead)
Amiot 145
Amiot 144 with Hispano-Suiza 14AA radial engines (not built)
Amiot 146
Amiot 144 with Gnome-Rhône 18Lars radial engines (not built)
Amiot 147
Amiot 144 with Hispano-Suiza 12Ydrs/12Yfrs (left and right hand rotation) V-12 engines (not built)
Amiot 150
Reconnaissance, torpedo bomber, for Aeronavale. developed from Amiot 143 with a 10% larger wing, interchangeable wheel or float landing gear, and powered by two 750 hp (560 kW) Gnome-Rhône 14Kdrs radials (1 prototype built)

== Operators ==
Independent State of Croatia

- Air Force of the Independent State of Croatia operated one example.

France

- Armee de l'Air operated 138 aircraft.
- French Navy

Vichy France

- Vichy French Air Force

Nazi Germany

- Luftwaffe operated a few captured aircraft.

Poland

- Polish Air Forces on exile in France
  - Groupe de Bombardement Marche Polonais in Lyon-Bron had assigned 3 aircraft in late May until 1 June, others were used for training in other units.

== Specifications (Amiot 143) ==
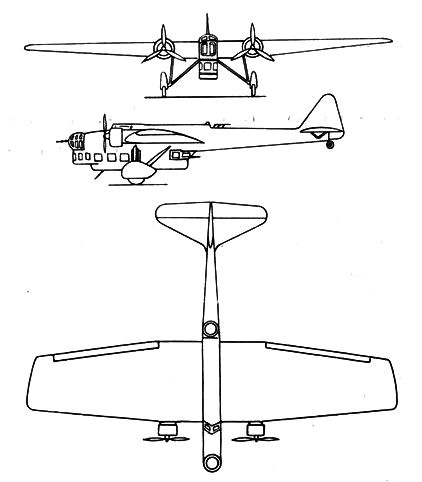
Amiot 143 3-view drawing from L'Aerophile October 1934

Data from

General characteristics

- Crew: Five (pilot, navigator/bombardier, radio operator, nose and dorsal gunners)
- Length: 18.24 m (59 ft 10 in)
- Wingspan: 24.53 m (80 ft 6 in)
- Height: 5.68 m (18 ft 8 in)
- Wing area: 100 m^{2} (1,100 sq ft)
- Empty weight: 5,455 kg (12,026 lb)
- Gross weight: 8,611 kg (18,984 lb)
- Max takeoff weight: 10,360 kg (22,840 lb)
- Powerplant: 2 × Gnome-Rhône 14Kirs/Kjrs 14-cyl. air-cooled radial engines, 640 kW (858 hp) each

Performance

- Maximum speed: 295 km/h (183 mph, 159 kn)
- Range: 1,300 km (810 mi, 700 nmi)
- Ferry range: 1,995 km (1,240 mi, 1,077 nmi)
- Service ceiling: 7,500 m (24,600 ft)
- Time to altitude: 2,000 m (6,600 ft) in 6.8 minutes

Armament

- Guns: 4 × 7.5 mm (0.295 in) MAC 1934 machine guns (one each in nose and dorsal turrets, forward gondola and rear gondola)
- Bombs: 800 kg (1,800 lb) internally plus 800 kg (1,800 lb) externally

== See also ==
Aircraft of comparable role, configuration, and era

- Bristol Bombay
- Junkers Ju 86
- Heinkel He 111B
- Martin B-10

Related lists

- List of interwar military aircraft
- List of aircraft of World War II
- List of aircraft of the French Air Force during World War II
- List of bomber aircraft
