= Blériot 117 =

General information
- Type: escort fighter aircraft
- National origin: France
- Manufacturer: Blériot Aéronautique S.A.

History
- First flight: 19 June 1924
- Developed into: Blériot 127

The Blériot 117 or B-117 was a large, twin-engined French aircraft from the mid-1920s. Heavily armed with three gun positions, it was designed to defend bomber formations against fighter attack. It did not reach production but was developed into the more successful Blériot 127.

== Design and development ==
The problem of protecting groups of day-bombers from fighter attack was recognised in the 1920s. One possible solution was, rather than arm individual aircraft with vulnerable gunners, to have heavily armed escorts. Blériot's analysis led them to prefer this conclusion and the bomber-like Blériot B-117 was the result. It was a twin-engined, mid-wing monoplane with three gunner's position providing a wide field of fire.

Its thick section, cantilever wing was in three parts, with a centre section between the engines and twin outer panels. The centre section was rectangular in plan and the outer panels were straight-tapered, square-tipped and constantly decreased in thickness outwards. The centre section had a steel tube structure which carried the engine mountings and the outer wings and was plywood-covered. Each outer panel was built around two spruce, ash and ply spars and had an aileron at its tip.

The fuselage of the B-117 had a rectangular cross-section defined by four spruce longerons and was entirely ply-covered over its central part, though elsewhere the upper and lower surfaces were canvas covered. There was a flexibly-mounted machine-gun position in the nose, whose operator was also the navigator, radio operator and photographer. An open cockpit at the wing leading edge housed the pilot and mechanic side-by side.

The B-117 was powered by a pair of 300 kW (400 hp) water-cooled Lorraine-Dietrich 12D V12 engines cooled with Vincent André radiators mounted on the undercarriage legs. Its engine mountings and square-sided nacelles were constructed from spruce and plywood. Under the wings, a pair of near-parallel struts on each side braced the bottom corner of the nacelle to the lower fuselage. The nacelles extended rearwards just beyond the wing trailing edge, where each housed a gunner with a flexibly-mounted machine gun. A corridor within the wing allowed access from the fuselage.

The B-117 had a slightly tapered tailplane mounted a little above the fuselage and carrying unbalanced elevators. The twin broad-chord balanced rudders were on small fins, mounted close together over the fuselage sides.

It had a conventional, fixed, tailskid undercarriage. Under each engine there was a pair of mainwheels on a single axle mounted on two vertical V-struts from the nacelle.

The B-117 flew for the first time on 19 June 1924. It did not reach production but was developed into the B-127, which had a very similar layout and dimensions though with more powerful engines and a single fin and rudder. Forty-two of these served with the Service Aéronautique.

== Specifications ==
Data from Les Ailes, April 1925

General characteristics

- Crew: Five
- Length: 14.53 m (47 ft 8 in)
- Wingspan: 23 m (75 ft 6 in)
- Height: 3 m (9 ft 10 in)
- Wing area: 86.50 m^{2} (931.1 sq ft)
- Empty weight: 3,000 kg (6,614 lb)
- Gross weight: 4,400 kg (9,700 lb)
- Powerplant: 2 × Lorraine-Dietrich 12D water-cooled V12 engine, 300 kW (400 hp) each
- Propellers: 2-bladed

Performance

- Maximum speed: 180 km/h (110 mph, 97 kn) at ground level
- Range: 800 km (500 mi, 430 nmi)
- Service ceiling: 5,000 m (16,000 ft)
