= Bréguet 410 =

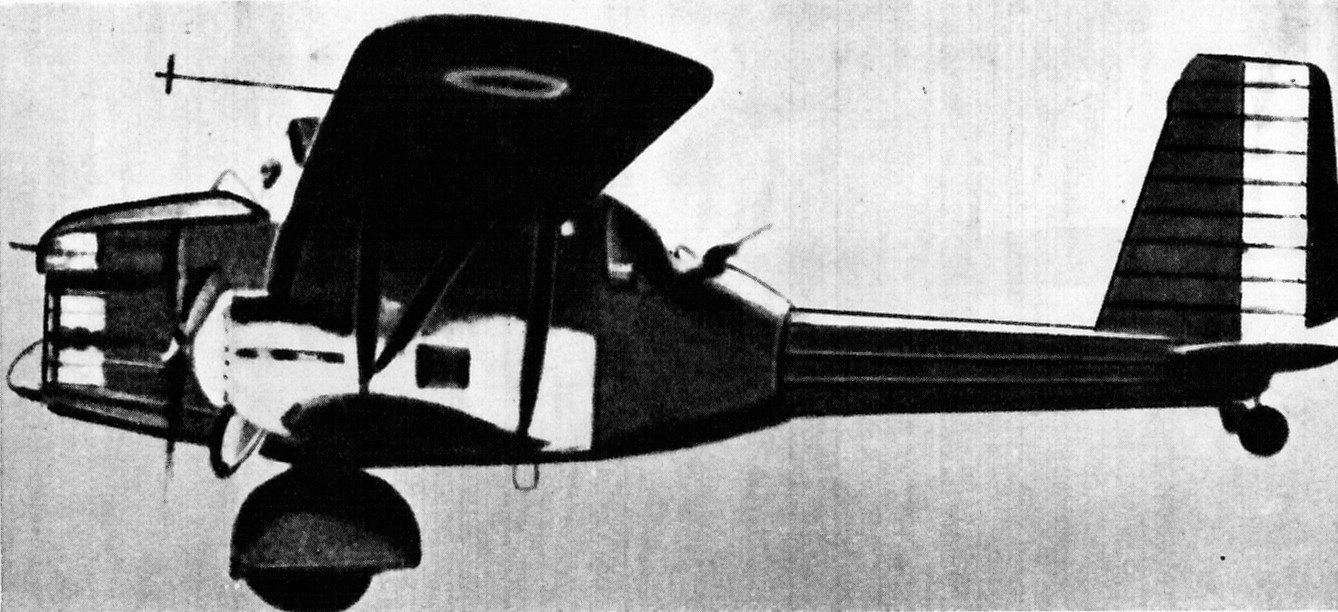

General information
- Type: Bomber aircraft
- National origin: France
- Manufacturer: Bréguet
- Primary users: Armée de l'Air Spanish Republican Air Force

History
- First flight: 1931
- Variant: Breguet 460

The Bréguet 410 was an all-metal sesquiplane biplane bomber that was designed and produced by the French aircraft manufacturer Bréguet.

It was developed during the late 1920s and early 1930s to meet the needs of the Technical Aeronautic Service ( Service Technique de L'Aéronautique ) of the French government. First flown in 1931, the Bréguet 410 had a steel frame covered with duralumin; its armament was two front and two rear 7.7 mm Lewis machine guns and it could carry a bombload up to 1300 kg. Despite the competing Amiot 143 being selected, production of the type proceeded nonetheless. Although quantity production did commence, the type was not produced in large numbers.

The Armée de l'Air procured several aircraft for its own uses. At least one Breguet 413, one of its variants, was sold to the Spanish Republican Air Force and saw action during the Spanish Civil War.

== Development ==
The Bréguet 410 was a sesquiplane prototype designed by Breguet Aviation in order to meet the requirements of the Technical Aeronautic Service ( Service Technique de L'Aéronautique ) of the French government towards the end of the 1920s, for a bomber and reconnaissance aircraft, which it referred to as Multiplace de Combat. Only one unit of the first variant, the Bréguet 410, was built, which was passed in favour of the competing Amiot 143 despite its combat qualities. Other prototypes, such as the Blériot 137 and the SPCA 30, underwent a similar fate as the Bréguet 410. Most of its later developments or variants never went past the prototype stage.

== Design ==
Breguet 410 in flight

The Bréguet 410 was an all-metal sesquiplane biplane bomber; the primary materials from which the fuselage was constructed included high-tensile steel and duralumin. The technical methods of its construction were quite similar to those of the earlier Breguet 270. While typically operated by a crew of three, some combat missions would have been performed using up to five people. The bombardier, who also doubled as the navigator, had a folding seat with a trapdoor directly in front of them; this was used both for aiming or for emergency egress, for which they were provided with a parachute. Some versions of the aircraft were equipped for night flying.

In order to provide favourable fields of fire for the gunners aft of the wing led to the adoption of relatively novel devices. Specifically, the shape of the fuselage is discontinuous in terms of both plan and profile to accommodate a constriction just behind the aft gun ring, which was claimed to considerably increase the position's field of fire, especially downwards. On some later-built versions of the aircraft, a third gun ring was present underneath the fuselage. Glass hoods were typically present around the gun rings.

The upper wing of the aircraft was directly attached to the top of the fuselage via its steel spars. Each half-wing comprised an elastic aileron/flap close to the fuselage, which increased the effective speed range as well as automatically stabilised the aircraft, as well as a separate differentially-controlled aileron towards the elliptical tip; the latter facilitated the constant application of force to the control stick across different flight speeds as well as increased effectiveness of the ailerons while travelling at low speed. The upper wing had an aspect ratio of nearly nine, which was uncommon for a thin semi-cantilever wing at that time.

The lower wing's structure comprised a single box spar, which was composed of steel, along with two parallel corrugated webs; the leading edge, which was made of duralumin, formed part of the box spar. The leading edges of the ribs consisted of stamped frames of either duralumin or steel, which were placed either in pairs or individually. The web and the covering were joined via reinforcing strips that formed flanges of variable thickness while continuous reinforcing strips of duralumin followed the line of the leading edge inside the girder. The after section of each half-wing had a framework of duralumin ribs, both plain and lattice ribs were used along with circular lightening holds. The trailing edge was attached using pins to the rear girder and closed by an auxiliary spar.

The spar of the lower wing was continuous and formed the main support of the whole structure. This spar directly attached via by steel brackets to various other elements, including steel triangular fuselage supports, tubular steel undercarriage fittings, strut fittings, and the duralumin engine bearers. The undercarriage was equipped with oleopneumatic shock absorbers while brakes were present to help slow the aircraft during landings. The tail boom, which had a similar structure to that of the lower wing, was attached to the fuselage using four bolts. Both the elevator and rudder were equipped with balancing flaps and were actuated using relatively rigid controls.

The Bréguet 410 was typically powered by a pair of Hispano-Suiza-built V-12 engines. A water cooling system, which used a large flexible tube, was present. Fuel was stored within two cylindrical fuel tanks located within the lower wing; fuel was supplied to the engine using pumps. If one of these tanks was compromised, both engines could be run from a single tank; fuel management was performed by the pilot. A fuel dumping mechanism was present, which used pipes present in the wing's trailing edge that connected the tanks. Oil was housed in a tank directly behind the fuel tanks.

The bombs were housed on vertical racks within the fuselage interior.

== Operational history ==
Breguet 411

The sole Bréguet 410 flew in 1931 powered by two Hispano-Suiza 12Nb engines. Developments followed though, with an upgraded and slightly modified version, the Bréguet 411, which flew in 1932. Like its predecessor this Bréguet aircraft was again rejected by the French government.

The Bréguet 413 was an improved version, fitted with more powerful Hispano-Suiza 12Ybrs engines. Four units were constructed for the Armée de l'Air, the first one of which flew in February 1933. At least one of these became part of the Escadrille Internationale and was sent to the Spanish Republican Air Force at the beginning of the Civil War in that country, but its fate is unknown.

A further development followed, the Bréguet 414, fitted with Gnome-Rhône 14Kdrs engines and first flew in November 1933. The sole 414 crashed in 1940.

The improved Bre 420 first flew on 13 August 1936, but failed to improve performance and handling enough to warrant production.

== Variants ==
Bre 410 M4
Light bomber with two HS12Nb engines (1931)
Bre 411 M5
Light bomber with two HS12Nb engines, (1932 - one built).
Bre 413
Light bomber with two HS12Ybrs engines (1933)
Bre 413 M4
Light bomber with two HS12Ybrs engines
Bre 414
Light bomber with two GR14Kirs radial engines (1933).
Bre 420
An improved 414 with modified rear fuselage and tail section.

== Operators ==
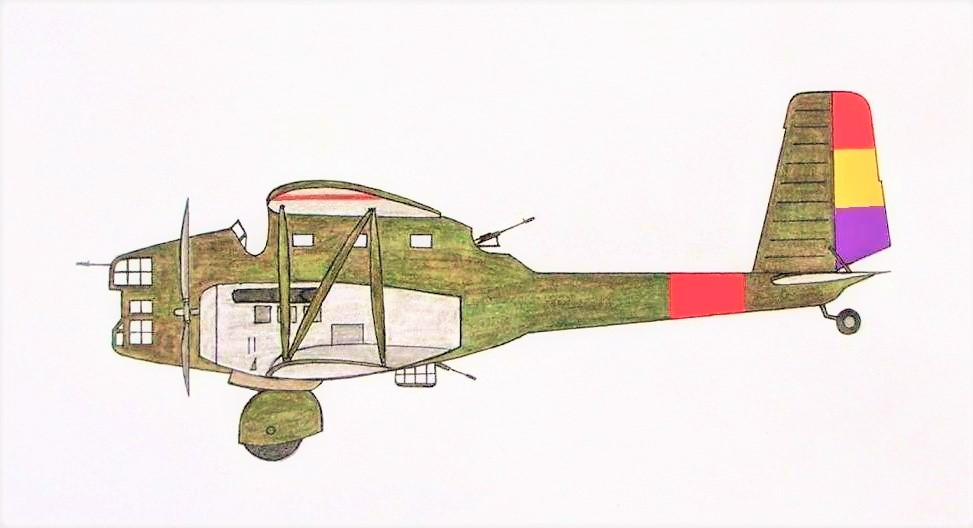
Breguet 413 of the Spanish Republican Air Force

France

- Armée de l'Air

Spain

- Spanish Republican Air Force

== Specifications ==
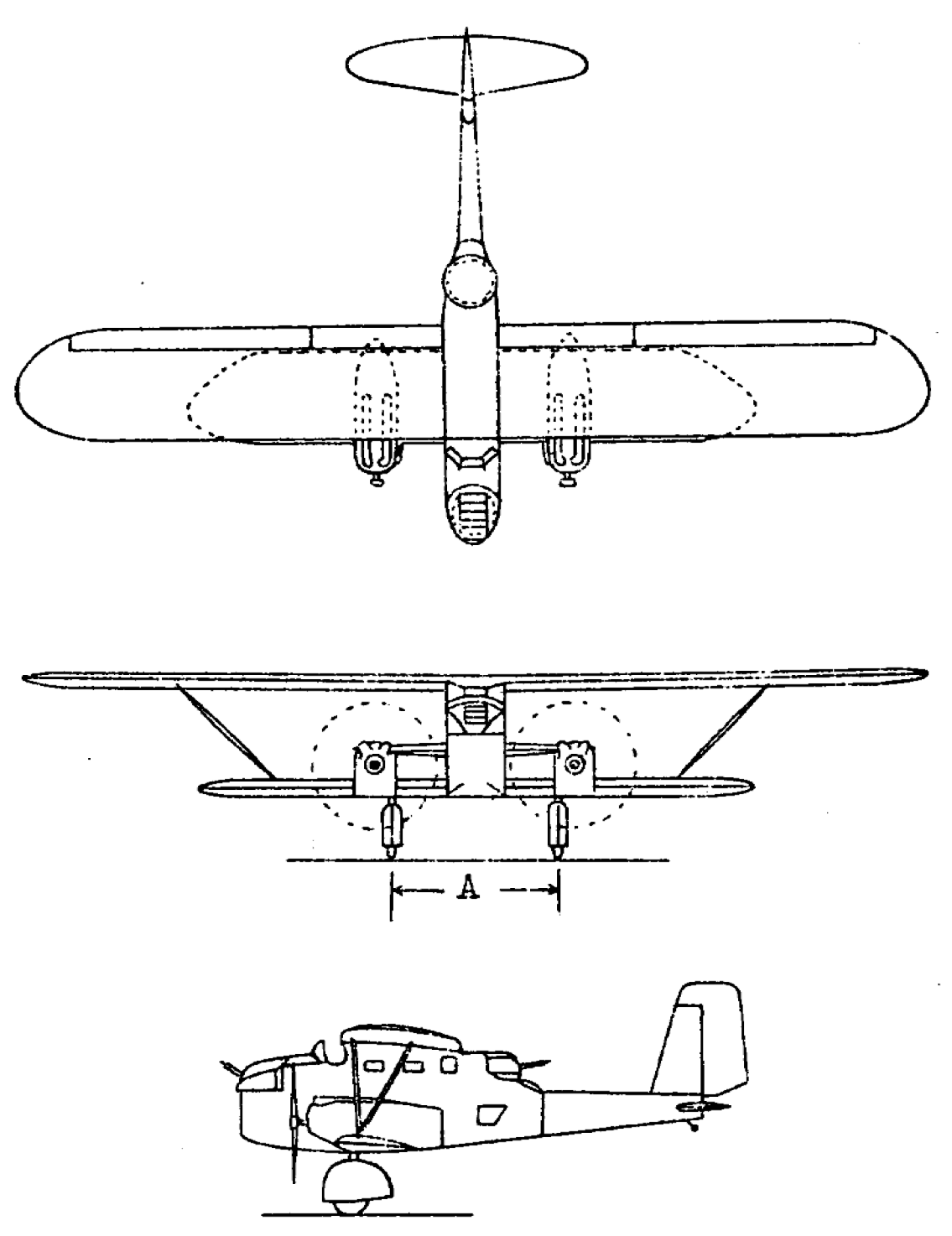
Breguet 411 M3 3-view drawing from NACA-AC-163

Data from .

General characteristics

- Crew: four
- Length: 11.30 m (37 ft 1 in)
- Wingspan: 20.20 m (66 ft 3 in)
- Height: 5.09 m (16 ft 8 in)
- Wing area: 67.15 m^{2} (722.8 sq ft)
- Empty weight: 3,500 kg (7,716 lb)
- Max takeoff weight: 7,200 kg (15,873 lb)
- Powerplant: 2 × Hispano-Suiza 12Y 36-litre water-cooled V12 engine, 480 kW (650 hp) 650 cv each

Performance

- Maximum speed: 310 km/h (190 mph, 170 kn)
- Cruise speed: 285 km/h (177 mph, 154 kn)
- Range: 1,300 km (810 mi, 700 nmi)
- Service ceiling: 10,000 m (33,000 ft)
- Rate of climb: 7.24 m/s (1,425 ft/min)

Armament

- Guns: 4 × 7.7 mm Lewis machine guns (two forward and two rearward)

== See also ==
Related development

- Breguet 460

Aircraft of comparable role, configuration, and era

- Amiot 143
- Blériot 127
- SAB AB-80
- SPCA 30

Related lists

- List of Interwar military aircraft
- List of aircraft of the Spanish Republican Air Force

== Bibliography ==
- Cortet, Pierre (August 2000). "Les bimoteurs à "poutre" Breguet 41" [The Beamy Twin-engined Breguet 41]. Avions: Toute l'Aéronautique et son histoire (in French) (89): 44–50. ISSN 1243-8650.
- Cortet, Pierre (October 2000). "Courrier des Lecteurs" [Readers' Letters]. Avions: Toute l'Aéronautique et son histoire (in French) (91): 3–4. ISSN 1243-8650.
- Cortet, Pierre (February 2000). "Rétros du Mois" [Retros of the Month]. Avions: Toute l'aéronautique et son histoire (in French) (83): 5. ISSN 1243-8650.
- "The Breguet 410 and 411 Military Airplanes (French): Multiplace Sesquiplane Fighters" National Advisory Committee for Aeronautics, 1 May 1932. NACA-AC-163, 93R19755.
