= Félix Amiot =

French industrialist (1894–1974)

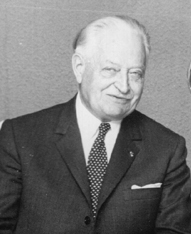
Amiot in 1968

Félix Amiot (English: /ˈæmioʊ/, French: [feliks amjo]; October 17, 1894 – December 21, 1974) was a French industrialist and aircraft constructor based in Colombes, France. Some of the aircraft models he designed served in the French Air Force during the Second World War. His second industrial activity was shipbuilding for fishing boats, sailing, and warship in Cherbourg. He became famous for designing and producing Missile Boat (fast attack craft) type "Combattante" which he sold worldwide.

== Biography ==
Born to a family of Christian background, in a small shopkeepers' family, his father being a grocer, Félix Amiot spent his childhood in Cherbourg, where he studied at the local public High School: Lycée Victor Grignard. During his childhood, he became passionate about mechanics and aviation. In 1908, his family left Cherbourg to settle down in Issy-les-Moulineaux, in the Paris suburbs, where the pioneers of the French aviation – Blériot, Voisin, the Farman brothers – had built aviation sheds and proceeded to fly trials of their engines on a nearby exercise ground. The proximity of the site was a strong inspiration for Amiot. In 1912, at the age of 18, he built his first plane in a garage near the training ground of Issy-les-Moulineaux. It was a two-seater monoplane, named after him: Amiot 01. In spite of the short-lived existence of this plane, damaged during a flight in 1913, Félix Amiot persevered with designing new planes. In September 1913, he registered his first patent for a "distribution system for fixed or rotary 2 or 4 times combustion engines ".

In September 1914, Félix Amiot served in the army and was sent to the war front, where he stayed until October 1915. He was then requested to work for Morane-Saulnier, away from the front lines. He developed an assembly process for metallic parts using a stamping technique. The aircraft industry was very interested in the development of this technology; it attracted the attention of Louis Loucheur, who was, at the time, Secretary of Armaments. Loucheur suggested that Amiot become director of an aircraft manufacturing factory. Pierre Wertheimer, owner of Chanel and Bourjois, financed Amiot's first company: "La Société d'Emboutissage et de Constructions Mécaniques" (SECM), based on the Avenue des Ternes, in Paris. SECM fabricated and repaired Morane-Saulnier, Breguet or Sopwith planes. At the end of 1917, a second workshop was created in Colombes.

In 1919, the SECM left the workshop at avenue des Ternes to settle down in a brand new factory in Colombes, in the close suburbs of Paris. In 1921, the SECM launched a design cabinet and began developing light passenger aircraft while at the same time, manufacturing planes under license – Breguet XIV, Breguet XIX, Farman F. 50, Dewoitine D1, etc. In 1926, the SECM produced the Amiot 120 family of planes, among which was the military by-product, the Amiot 122, which was the first plane of the firm to be ordered in series by the French Army. The model became famous in 1927 and 1928 for a series of successful raids – Circuit of the Mediterranean Sea and Saharan circuit – and a double attempt, with an Amiot 123, at crossing the Atlantic Ocean in 1928 and 1929, piloted by the Polish crew – Idzikowski and Kubala. In 1928, in order to increase his activity, Félix Amiot acquired the seaplanes firm Latham, based in Caudebec-en-Caux. In 1929, the SECM merged with several aircraft manufacturers around Lorraine-Dietrich to form the "Société Générale Aéronautique" (SGA). The Wertheimer brothers and Amiot, as well as the shareholders, won impressive dividends. But in 1934 the company faced a financial crisis. To avoid bankruptcy, the French State authorized Amiot and Marcel Bloch to buy back the bankrupt company. Amiot and the Wertheimer brothers acquired it for a small amount of money.

In 1937, the SECM was partially nationalized: the Colombes factory was kept by Amiot, whereas Caudebec-en-Caux became a state-owned company, becoming the SNCAN. To compensate for the loss, Félix Amiot created in 1938 a new factory in his hometown Cherbourg. At Colombes and Cherbourg, he developed the Amiot 340, 350 and 370, a series of bombers succeeding Amiot 143 which he had just produced in series for the French Air Force. These new models broke several records and acquired recognition: – September 1937 to August 1939: an Amiot 370 piloted by Commander Maurice Rossi, broke a series of speed records for 1 000 km, 2 000 km, and 5 000 km distance with different loads of 500, 1000, and 2000 kilos. – August 1938: the prototype Amiot 340 was chosen by General Vuillemin, Chief of Air Force Staff, on a diplomatic visit to Berlin. – From 1938: the French Air Force ordered 1 800 Amiot 350 and by-products. The SECM received numerous requests to acquire the manufacturing license. However, the planes mass production was affected by Amiot's bad relations with the Air Ministry, and the constant technical changes required by the Service Technique de l'Aéronautique. In January 1939, Pierre Wertheimer left for the United States, aiming at establishing a factory in New Orleans.

=== WWII ===
In June 1940, the Wertheimer brothers urgently left France for Brazil, then settled down in New York. They asked Amiot to take care of their assets and business based in France and handed over to him all their SECM shares and a majority stake in Chanel and Bourjois Perfumes. On June 3, 1940, in Le Bourget, Amiot workshops were severely bombarded. Two days later, it was the turn of Cherbourg. On June 10, Amiot evacuated his 3,000 workers staff to the south of France. He obtained 3 million Francs from the government, then based in Bordeaux, in return for his pre-war orders. On June 13, 1940, the French army, in violation of free city status, ordered the destruction by fire of the Colombes workshops. In retribution, the German Army occupied the factory which had been partially destroyed by the French army and looted by the German army, stole what was left, and moved the workshop machines to Junkers, a firm based in Dessau in Germany.

After the Armistice, Amiot repatriated his staff to Paris. "Though", as he wrote in his Memoirs from the Occupation, "I managed to subtract the design office and to keep it in the free zone". In order to recuperate late payments and to be financed by the French state, he settled his company in Vichy. From Vichy, Amiot contacted the Resistance, they advised him to pursue his activity. In 1940, the German state contacted Amiot to request Junkers' planes. Unsure if he should comply with the German's request and collaborate, Amiot wrote to Marshall Pétain to ask for instructions. Forced to work for the German occupiers, he decided, however, not to get personally involved and left his company's management with two orders. Firstly, to slow down production as much as possible without attracting the attention of the German Occupant and put his staff in danger. Secondly, to enroll everyone who would ask for work at the factory without any discrimination: STO objectors, resistants, Communists, or French Jews who were in hiding such as Marie-Claire Servan-Schreiber. Amiot reconstituted a factory in Marseille and employed numerous workers who wanted to escape the STO (forced labor in Germany). After the war, his behavior was taken into consideration when his case was examined to assess his collaboration with the German forces.

In the spring of 1942, Amiot employees aimed at recreating the industrial activity which had been disrupted by the war. They turned to Pierre Wertheimer, who, in the meanwhile, had become an administrator to the aircraft manufacturer Bell in the United States. It was impossible to coordinate the two companies as they tried to establish a squadron at the colors of Free France in North Africa. Félix Amiot personally financed a resistance network that clandestinely helped 10 persons to escape to North Africa and sent information to the Allies. Unfortunately, the network was dismantled in May 1943, leading to the arrest by the Gestapo of Yves Maurice, head of design and close collaborator to Amiot, in Perpignan.

However, Amiot was busy defending the interests of the Wertheimer brothers; he bought back their perfume and beauty companies. At the end of the War, when Chanel and Bourjois accounts were settled, the Wertheimer brothers contested Amiot's decision. Amiot had made fake documents to prove that the Wertheimer companies complied with Aryan regulations imposed by the Nazi regime, whereas at the same time associating himself with Junkers Flugzeug-und-Motorenwerke to build 370 Junkers Ju 52 transport planes. After the Liberation, the Colombes company built its devices under the name AAC 01 Toucan. Amiot was questioned by the Gestapo, in September 1942. Amiot had held back the management of the Wertheimer's factories, in spite of Coco Chanel's attempts to take control of the perfumes bearing her name, helped by the relations she had with the Occupation German authorities. Soon after the Liberation of Paris, Amiot received General Bradley at his castle of Boissière-Beauchamps in Lévis-Saint-Nom. Amiot sent a telegram to the Wertheimer brothers informing them of the liberation of France from Nazi Germany.

After the war, Pierre Wertheimer launched judicial procedures against Amiot to recover some benefits. Amiot at the end of the war was in a good financial situation. However, he was arrested on 6 September 1944 with the direction of the SECM accused of collaboration and "antisocial conduct". Quickly released, the charges were abandoned in 1947 after the tribunal cleared his name. The SECM, which had been requisitioned in 1944, was nationalized in 1946, through a private sale to the Government, ending its aeronautics activities.

=== After WWII ===
Amiot dedicated himself to the reconstruction of his factory in Cherbourg, which became the "Constructions Mécaniques de Normandie" (CMN) developing into shipbuilding. In 1948, the CMN launched their first ship: the trawler "Annie" for the "Chalutiers Cherbourgeois" ' fleet, taken back by Félix Amiot in 1946. He built various types of light military ships, minesweepers, and mine hunters, patrol boats, etc.

He was also interested in the sailing market, which started booming and produced the Maïca's series, long-distance yachts using glued laminated timber technology, which had been designed by English naval architects John Illingworth and Angus Primrose, it became famous during the Fastnet race. CMN shipbuildings counted among his customers known skippers such as Olivier de Kersauson or Eric Tabarly. A skillful businessman, Amiot conceived La Combattante-class, a missile-boat which was exported all over the world thanks to good market analysis.

A few of his missile-boats became part of the famous event known as the boats of Cherbourg. On 1969 Christmas Christmas Eve, 5 boats were illegally delivered to Israel, breaking the French embargo proclaimed by the General de Gaulle in 1969. Amiot was then 75 years old.

Félix Amiot was also a talented engineer-inventor who holds 100 patents to his name. One of the most important ones is the stamping technology used to assemble metallic parts. Another one is the 1950 patent related to the improvement of fish preservation. At the beginning of the 1950s, he worked on improving deep-sea trawlers. In 1960, he became one of the first in France to develop a license for rear operating trawlers boats.

At his death on 21 December 1974, Félix Amiot left a worldwide recognized company employing more than 1,400 workers with booking orders for the 4 years to come. He was buried at Lévis-Saint-Nom cemetery, near his Boissière-Beauchamps property mansion.

== See also ==
- Avions Amiot
- Constructions Mécaniques de Normandie
- Cherbourg Project
