= Avions Amiot =

Defunct French aircraft manufacturer

- Industry: Aeronautics, defence
- Founded: 1916
- Founder: Félix Amiot
- Defunct: 1945
- Fate: Merged
- Successor: Constructions Mécaniques de Normandie
- Headquarters: Cherbourg, France
- Products: Aircraft

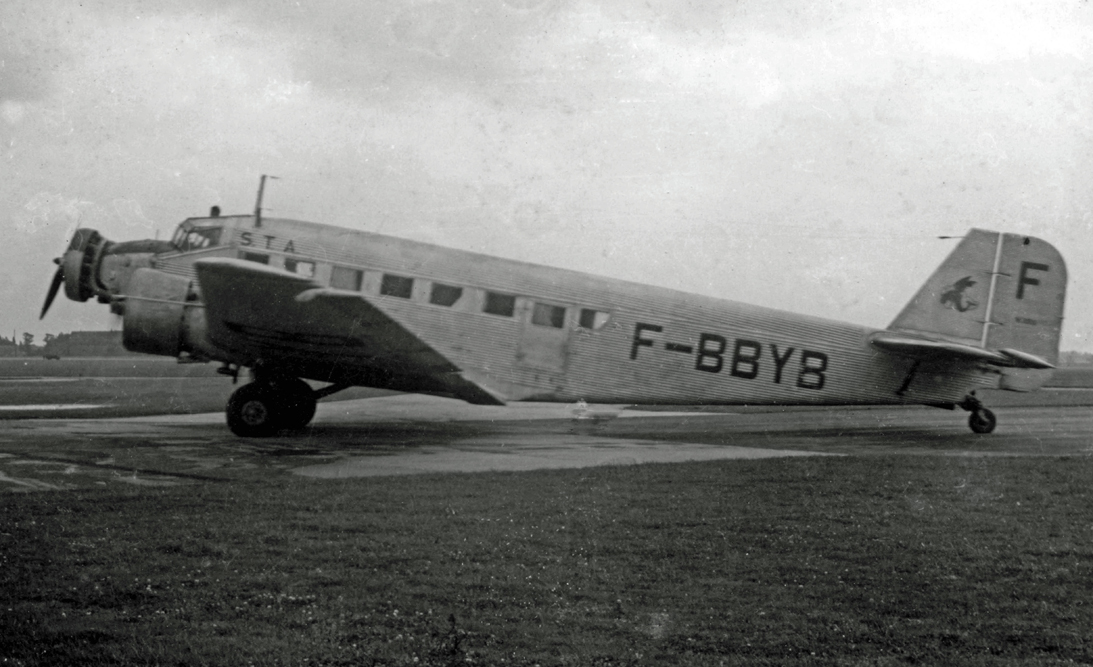
Amiot AAC.1 of Societe Trans Atlantique (STA) at Manchester Airport in 1948

Avions Amiot was a former French aircraft manufacturer. The company was formed in 1916 by Félix Amiot as the Society of Mechanical Drawing and Construction (SECM).

== History ==
Félix Amiot's first aircraft was built in a Paris garage in 1913, but it was not until 1916, during the First World War, that he became seriously involved in construction. The Minister of Defence granted a contract to SECM (French: Société d’emboutissage et de constructions mécaniques), owned by the Wertheimer brothers, Paul and Pierre, together with Félix Amiot. SECM and Amiot functioned as sub-contractors and assemblers only, and did not produce their own designs.

After the war, SECM and Amiot constructed light aircraft. In 1929 the company made a large sum of money selling its interest in the Lorraine-Dietrich engine company to the government. In 1934, controversially, the Lorraine company, then known as SGA, was sold to Amiot-SECM and Marcel Bloch for a fraction of the price the government had paid five years earlier.

As well as SGA, and the original SECM-Amiot works at Le Bourget, Amiot controlled the CAN (French: Chantiers aéronautiques de Normandie) at Cherbourg. In the early phases of rearmament, Amiot scored a considerable success with the Amiot 143, widely considered one of the ugliest aircraft, along with its contemporary the Potez 542, to have flown.

As the pace of rearmament increased in the late 1930s, Amiot scored another success, this time with the elegant Amiot 354 bomber. With the fall of Paris in June 1940, Amiot and 3000 of his workers headed south, to the unoccupied zone, where he established a new factory at Marseille. During the war, Amiot co-operated with the German occupiers to protect his interests, and those of the exiled Wertheimers, then working in the United States. Amiot became a subcontractor for the Junkers company, building 370 aircraft. Licence production of the Junkers Ju 52 trimotor continued after the war under the designation Amiot AAC.1 Toucan. Over 400 units were built for the French military and for airline use in France and its overseas territories.

== Aircraft ==
- Amiot 110 - 1928
- Amiot 110-S (Seaplane) - 1931
- Amiot 120 Series - 1925
- Amiot 140/150 Series - 1931
- Amiot 340/350 Series - 1940
- Amiot AAC.1 Toucan - (Junkers Ju 52)
