= Blériot 127 =

French bomber (first flight 1926)

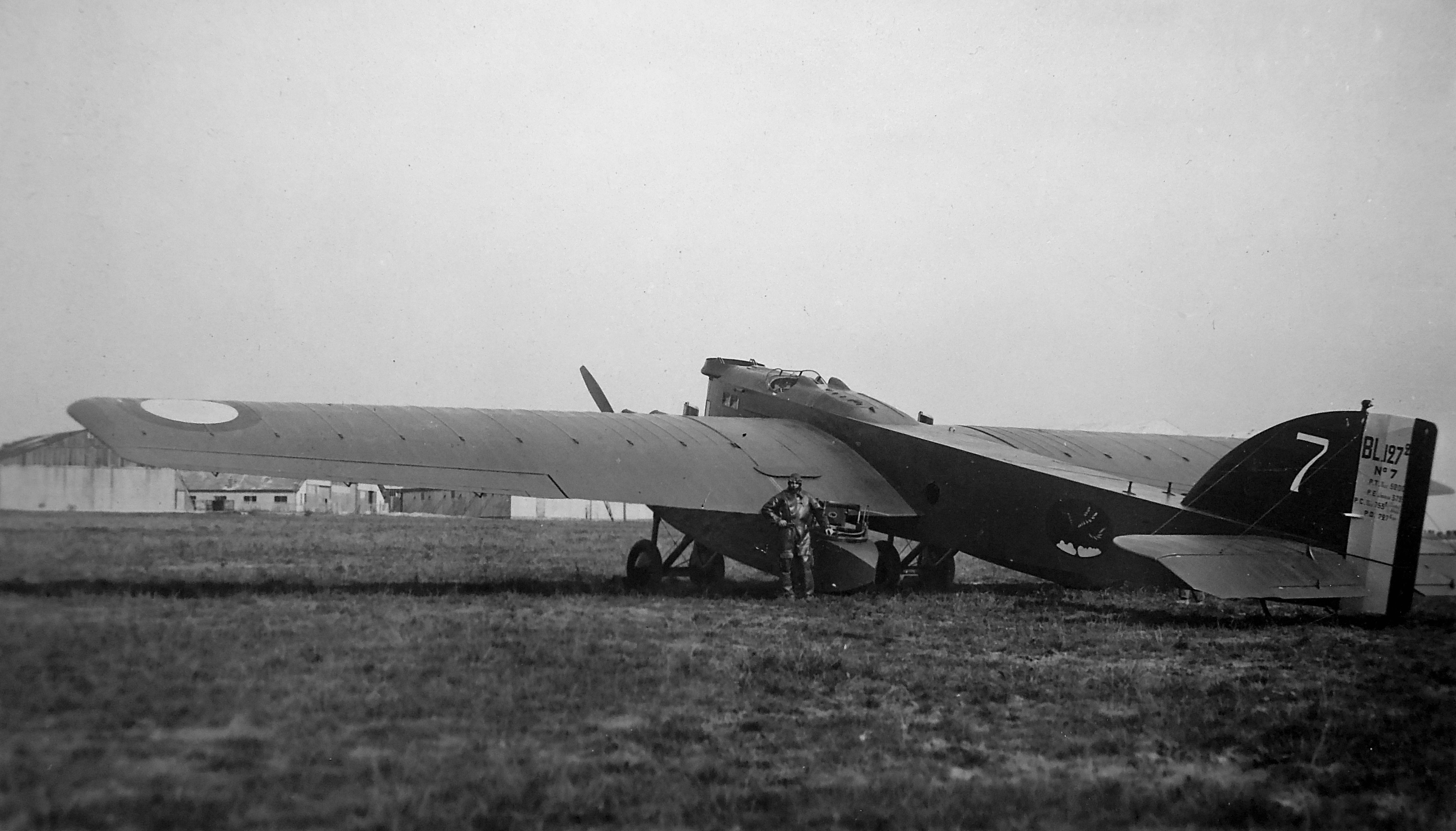
- Blériot 127

General information
- Type: Bomber
- Manufacturer: Blériot
- Designer: Leon Kirste
- Primary user: Armée de l'Air
- Number built: 44

History
- Introduction date: April 1929
- First flight: 7 May 1926
- Retired: 1934

The Blériot 127 (or Bl-127) was a monoplane bomber aircraft developed and produced by the French aircraft manufacturer Blériot.

It was derived from the Blériot 117 escort fighter during the mid 1920s. The Blériot 127 was a relatively large aircraft for the era, featuring a conventional basic configuration and open gunner's positions in its nose and at the rear of its two underwing engine nacelles. The wing airfoil was of sufficient thickness that the engines could be entered from the fuselage in flight.

Forty-two aircraft were operated by the Armée de l'Air from 1929 until 1934, by which time they were obsolete.

== Design ==
The Blériot 127 is a cantilever monoplane bomber aircraft; it was specifically designed, in addition to its primary bombing role, to accompany and defend other ground-attack and aerial observation aircraft. The interior of the aircraft was divided into several sections, one of which formed a dedicated compartment for the navigator. Various navigational facilities were provisioned, including a compass, drift indicator, speed indicator, and a table. Other equipment included a radio set, and a camera with a radius of 50 cm (19.7 inches) that was suitable for both vertical and oblique photography, controls for the vertical bomb rack, electrical generator, and suitable lighting for conducting night flights.

The structure of the fuselage was formed from box girders along with interior bracing members of turned wood. Both the floor and ceiling were primarily composed of plywood strengthened by cross pieces as the joints and occasionally at other areas. Plywood gussets provided sufficient joint rigidity while and bracing wires held the whole arrangement in shape. Upright duralumin tubing was used to connect the planes. The rear of the fuselage ended in a box girder, which supported the tail skid and empennage. The vertical empennage comprised a rounded fin and the rudder, while the horizontal empennage comprises a conventional stabilizer and elevator arrangement. Both the rudder and elevator were provided with compact regulating planes similar to those present pm the ailerons while actuation was achieved via a series of flexible cables.

The wing of the Blériot 127, which lacked any external bracing, had a trapezoidal shape with a straight leading edge that was optimised both for aerodynamic efficiency and to minimise its obstruction to the firing arcs of the aircraft's self-defence gunners. Near the fuselage, this wing was relatively thick of 17.5% at the point where the wing joins the fuselage. The structure of the wing comprised a pair of narrow box spars that used a series of open-work box ribs as compression members for the internal bracing. Support for the intermediate ribs came for a pair of strips that ran parallel to the spars. Due to the wing's relatively thick profile, both the upper and lower flanges were independent of one another and functioned as a continuous girder. In the thinner areas of the wing, the ribs were strengthened with a lattice structure. The leading edge was covered with a bent sheet of plywood which extended behind the front spar to form large gussets close to the box ribs; a similar arrangement was present for the rear spar as well. The section of the wing aft of the rear spar was an independent element that was attached at 12 points to both the upper and lower flanges of the spar; this section supported the relatively narrow aileron, which extended to the tip of the wing, along with a compact regulating plane that was embedded into the trailing edge.

It was powered by a pair of Hispano-Suiza 12Hb engines, each capable of providing up to 500 HP, which were installed within lateral nacelles placed at either side of the fuselage. Each of these nacelles contains a pair of box girders that were extensions of the wing structure. A combination of box girders and oblique tubular struts supported the engine bed, the suspension plane of which corresponded to the lower part of the wing. Cooling was provided by water radiators that were positioned either in front of the W-type engines or underneath the wing between the fuselage and the nacelles with the V-type engines. Due to the positioning of the fuel tanks within the fuselage, at a relatively far distance from the engines, the risk posed by fire was considered to be low.

Self-defence measures comprised a machine gun mounted on the bow of the fuselage along with a pair of distinctive gun mounts, one at the stern of each engine nacelle. The fields of fire of these machine guns are free from any dead angles, the gunners were even capable of crossing their fire within only few yards to the rear of the aircraft. The relatively high speed of the aircraft for the era posed some challenges to the effective firing of defensive guns, although Blériot made attempts to compensate for the sighting difficulties. To this end, the forward gunner's position was protected by the circular cowling while the other gun mounts were provisioned with windshields on the top of the wing, which would only be raised while firing. To assist the crew in effectively communicating within one another, aviophones, along with a calling device, were provisioned for the different posts.

The undercarriage of the aircraft consisted of two independent legs, one under each nacelle, that were of a then-conventional V-shaped arrangement. It featured a false axle along with a pair of wheels, double cross-bracing that mitigated the stresses from skidding, and shock absorbers that used a combination of rubber and cables. Provision was made for the substitution of a Blériot-designed elastic wheel in place of each two-wheel landing gear.

== Variants ==
- 127/1 - Prototype with Hispano-Suiza 12Gb W-12 piston engines.
- 127/2 - Main production version, fitted with two Hispano-Suiza 12Hb V-12 piston engines.
- 127/3 - Single prototype of night bomber version.
- 127/4 - Single conversion of 127/4 with revised undercarriage.
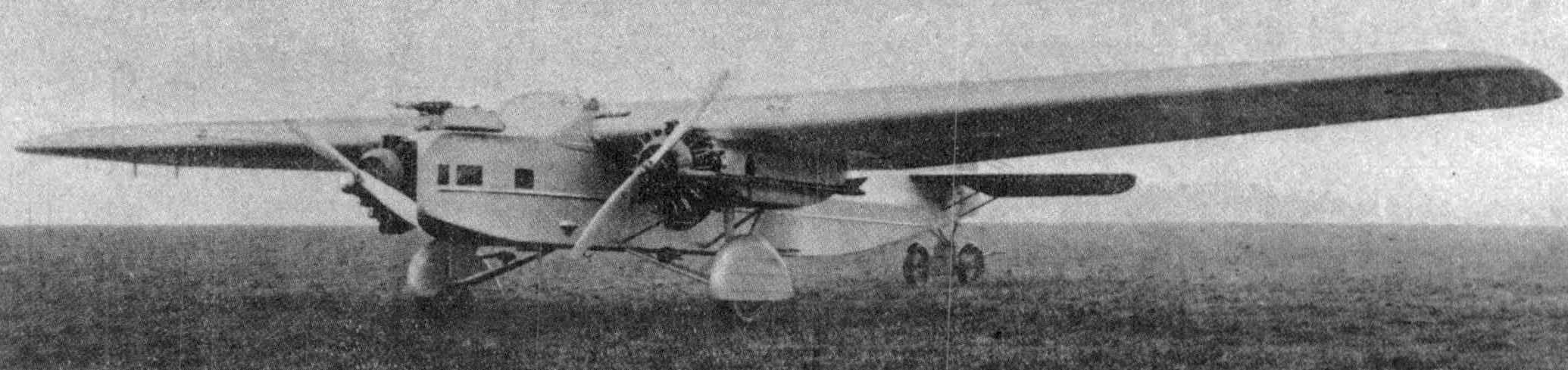
  Blériot 137 photo from NACA-AC-169
- 137 - All-metal high-wing prototype designed in order to meet the requirements of the Service Technique de l'Aéronautique (STAé) of the French government towards the end of the 1920s for a light bomber and reconnaissance plane type designated as Multiplace de Combat. The two aircraft built, (Bl-137 M0 and M1), were eliminated from competition in favour of the competing Amiot 143. Other Multiplace de Combat prototypes built at the time, such as the SPCA 30 and the Breguet 410, underwent a similar fate to the Blériot 137.

== Operators ==
France

- French Air Force

== Specifications (Blériot Bl-127/2) ==
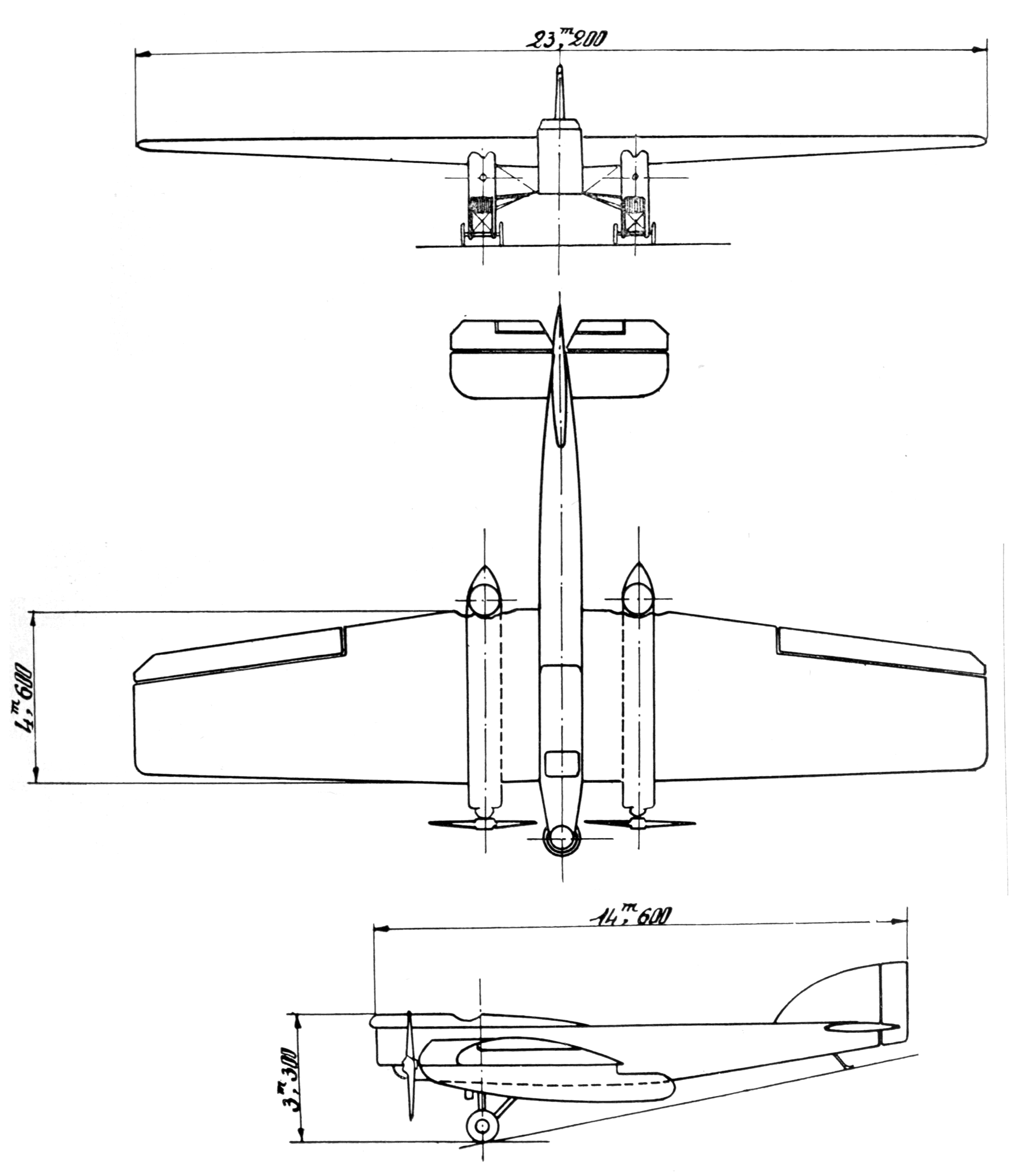
Blériot 127 3-view drawing from L'Air May 15, 1928

Data from Jane's all the World's Aircraft 1928, Aviafrance:Bl-127/2

General characteristics

- Crew: 4 to 6
- Length: 14.5 m (47 ft 7 in)
- Wingspan: 23.2 m (76 ft 1 in)
- Height: 3.41 m (11 ft 2 in)
- Wing area: 88 m^{2} (950 sq ft)
- Empty weight: 3,252 kg (7,169 lb)
- Gross weight: 4,466 kg (9,846 lb)
- Fuel capacity: 520 kg (1,150 lb)
- Powerplant: 2 × Hispano-Suiza 12Hb V-12 water-cooled piston engine, 410 kW (550 hp) each
- Propellers: 2-bladed fixed pitch wooden propellers

Performance

- Maximum speed: 221 km/h (137 mph, 119 kn) at 2,000 m (6,600 ft)

216 km/h (134 mph; 117 kn) at 4,000 m (13,000 ft)
207 km/h (129 mph; 112 kn) at 6,000 m (20,000 ft)

- Range: 1,500 km (930 mi, 810 nmi)
- Service ceiling: 8,100 m (26,600 ft)
- Time to altitude: 4,000 m (13,000 ft) in 12 minutes and 21 seconds
- Wing loading: 50.7 kg/m^{2} (10.4 lb/sq ft)
- Power/mass: 0.168 kW/kg (0.102 hp/lb)

Armament

- 2 × forward trainable 7.7 mm (0.30 in) Lewis guns in nose
- 2 × rearward trainable 7.7 mm (0.30 in) Lewis guns in each of two engine nacelles
- 1,000 kg (2,200 lb) of bombs carried in an internal bay
