= Amiot 120 =

French single-engined biplane aircraft family

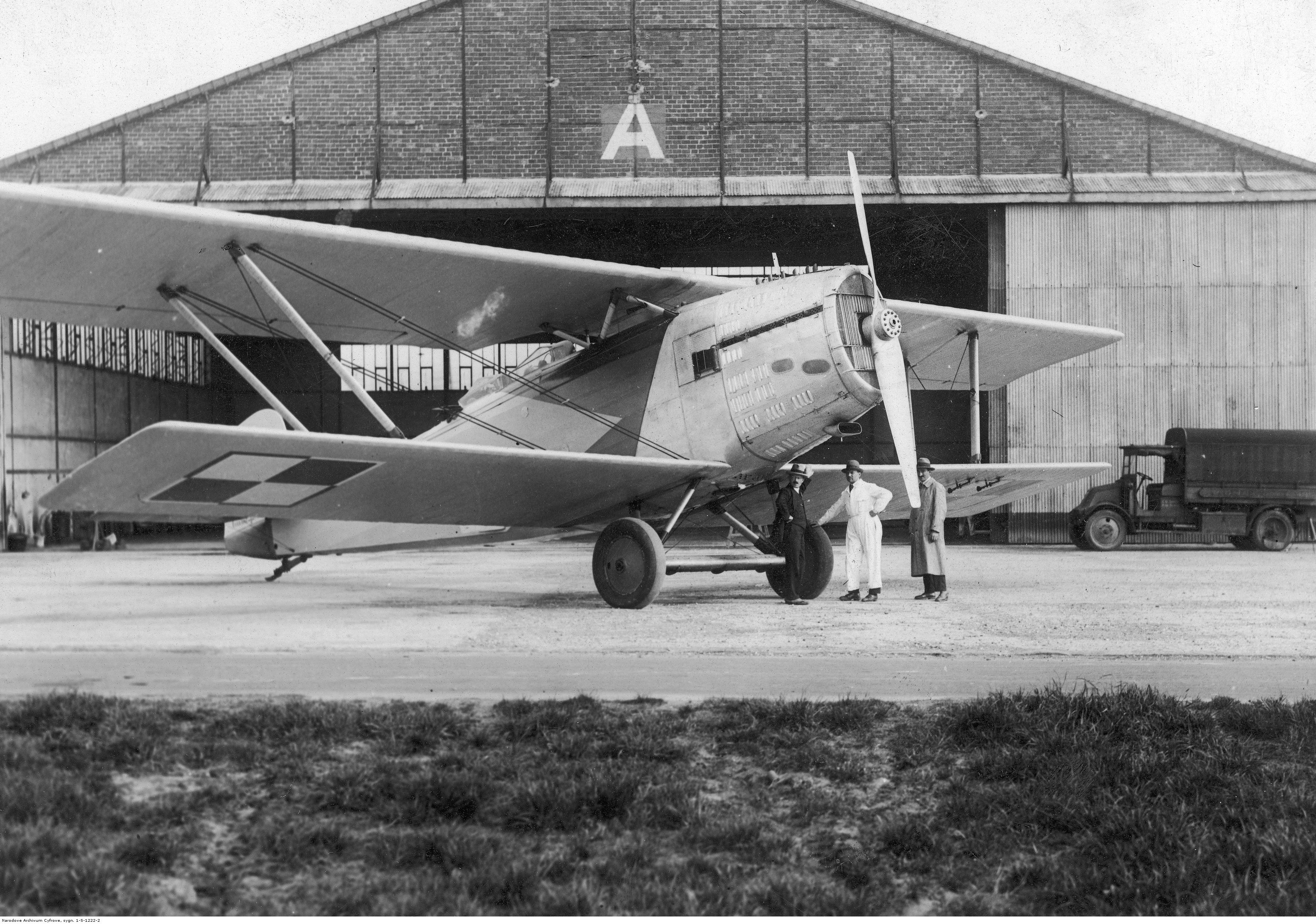

General information
- Type: Bomber aircraft
- Manufacturer: Amiot
- Primary users: French Air Force Brazilian Air Force; Polish Air Force

History
- Manufactured: ~85+6
- First flight: 1925

The Amiot 120 was a family of single-engine biplane bomber aircraft designed and produced by the French aircraft manufacturer SECM-Amiot.

The Amiot 120 was designed during the early to mid-1920s. As a result of a design to incorporate a high proportion of metal in its construction, years of detailed studies and testing, overseen by French officials, were conducted in advance of the detailed design phase. During 1925, the Amiot 120 BN2 performed its maiden flight, however, orders were not immediately forthcoming. Further development of the type proceeded throughout the latter half of the 1920s. During this time, the prototype Amiot 122 was used as a long-distance sports aircraft, carrying out a 10,800 km (6,710 mi; 5,830 nmi) tour around the Mediterranean Sea.

The only series-built variant was Amiot 122 BP3 medium bomber, the majority being acquired by the French Air Force. The Amiot 123 was a long-distance variant that achieved record-breaking performance during the late 1920s; it was this model that was purchased by the Polish Air Force, seeking to conduct its first westbound transatlantic flight. However, both aircraft were lost during the two attempts made. The Brazilian Air Force also operated the type.

== Development ==
The aircraft was designed from the onset to be operated a medium-sized single-engine biplane bomber; while otherwise conforming to the prevailing conventions of the era, it made use of metal construction. To support the aircraft's development, a three year period of in-depth studies into metal construction was conducted along with two years of practical testing; the results were overseen by numerous French official committees. These practical tests led to various refinements and alterations being made to the aircraft's design.

The first of the series was Amiot 120 BN2, a twin-seat prototype bomber, which was powered with a Renault 12Ma 580 hp inline engine (registration F-AHCR). It was not ordered by the French Air Force and only one example was built. More successful was the next slightly enlarged variant, the Amiot 122, of 1927, powered by a single Lorraine 18 Kd engine. While the initial production variant was the Amiot 122 BP2 twin-seat bomber (registration F-AIUQ), quantity production did not truly proceed until the arrival of the Amiot 122 BP3, a three-seat bomber. A total of 80 aircraft were built for the French Air Force and five for Brazil.

Further variants were developed. The Amiot 123 had been designed as a bomber, designated the Amiot 123 BP3 (one was built) but the French Air Force showed no interest in it. At that time, Polish authorities were looking for a long-distance record aircraft for transatlantic flights. In 1928 and 1929, two modified Amiot 123s were built as a long-distance variant, being equipped with enlarged fuel tanks (first had Lorraine 18 Kdrs 710 hp engine, the second Lorraine 18 Kdrs 785 hp engine).

The last two variants, the Amiot 124 BP3 and Amiot 125 BP3 were bomber prototypes in 1931, fitted with Hispano-Suiza 18Sbr 1000 hp and Renault 18Jbr 700 hp engines respectively, but not ordered by the French Air Force. Some sources claim, that Amiot 121 with a Lorraine 18 Kd 650 hp engine and Amiot 126 prototypes with a Lorraine 18 Gad 700 hp engine were also built.

== Design ==
The Amiot 120 was a family of single-engine biplane bomber aircraft. In terms of its configuration, it was a largely conventional aircraft, although its construction made use of a relatively high level of metal amongst its contemporaries. The fuselage consisted of a frame of duralumin tubing. All structural elements were designed to withstand excessive loading, having been calculated with a high safety factor. These tubes were intentionally standarised, making them relatively ease to repair and replace locally. Stamped sheet metal, typically composed of duralumin, was used as a covering for key areas, such in the immediate vicinity of the engine, although much of the aircraft actually had a fabric covering. The aircraft was equipped with a fixed conventional undercarriage along with a rear skid. The wheels of the main landing gear could be adjusted, such as to compensate for deformations sustained during hard landings; stronger wheels could also be fitted for situations such as taking off from very soft ground while heavily loaded.

A crew of three (typically comprising a pilot, gunner, and bombardier) were seated in tandem in open cockpits. The bombardier was seated within the same bay at the gunner, the former being directly behind the latter in a lower position that protected their position from the wind so they could better operate the various sighting instruments. In addition to a bombsight and a drift meter, a 3.6 meter trap door was provided so that the bombardier had a generous forward-facing field of view. The bombardier was able to directly control the aircraft's direction for aiming purposes via an auxiliary rudder bar, although the pilot's control authority remained active at all times. Favourable visibility was available for both navigation and for bombing purposes, including via the use of various lateral openings that were protected by windshields; the bombardier could assist with observation when not occupied by their primary bombing role.

It was typically powered by a single engine, usually a Lorraine-Dietrich 18Kd, capable of providing up to 650 hp. However, the aircraft had been designed to be furnished with virtually any engine in the 650-1000 hp range, including both French-built engines by Farman and Renault as well as foreign engines from Rolls-Royce, Fiat, and BMW. When powered by the Lorraine engine, the aircraft could achieve a relatively high cruising speed for the era of 190 kmh (118 mph) at 70 percent of the engine's power. To permit ground crew to more easily service the engine, the hood contained a total of six removable panels that could be quickly replaced if damaged. Somewhat unusually, the engine could be accessed mid-flight via a door in the firewall; this arrangement permitted a general inspection of the engine, including the various pipes carrying water, fuel, and oil, as well as slight repairs such as plugging in a spark plug.

The Amiot 120 was a fairly manoeuvrable aircraft for a bomber, being relatively rapid and precise while also reportedly easy to manage across all altitudes. It was provisioned with quite smooth flight controls, which permitted the pilot fly long-range missions even through inhospitable weather conditions without becoming overly fatigued. Various inspection ports in the wings permitted the control rods to be easily inspected. The use of large tail surfaces allowed for effective control to be maintained even below the aircraft's documented minimum flight speed, which facilitated short landings as well as being particularly beneficial when approaching stall conditions.

The aircraft was equipped with various defensive armaments. In addition to a pair of pilot-operated forward-facing machine guns that fired through the propeller arc, the gunner's position had a flexibly-mounted twin-Lewis guns that could be fired at almost any area above the aircraft. In addition to these upper machine guns, the gunner had a further two machine guns, one forward-facing and the other aft-facing, which were intended to cover the dead angles underneath the aircraft that were not covered by the upper guns. When equipped with supplementary fuel tanks, for which the aircraft had been designed from the onset to be attached when applicable, the aircraft could perform bombardments while carrying 590 kg (1,300 lb.) of bombs at a maximum distance of roughly 1,700 km (1,056 miles).

== Operational history ==
The Amiot 122 was first used as a long-distance sports aircraft. From 13 September 1927, the prototype carried out a 10,800 km tour around the Mediterranean Sea, from Paris, through Vienna, Beirut, Cairo, Benghazi, Tunis, Casablanca to Paris. From 3–5 April 1928, Lieutenant Girardot flew it across the Sahara, on the Paris-Timbuktu-Dakar-Paris 10,100 km route.

A total of 80 Amiot 122 BP3s were used by the French Air Force as reconnaissance bombers, starting in 1930. They were used in the 11th Aviation Regiment, based in Metz. They were nicknamed by pilots La Grosse Julie (Big Julie).

During 1931, Brazil ordered five aircraft (four, according to Brazilian publications). One aircraft was used on the government side during a coup d'etat in July 1932. They were lasted recorded as being used during 1936.

=== Transatlantic flights ===
French Navy aviation pioneer Capitaine de frégate (Frigate Captain) Paul Teste was killed in the crash of an Amiot 120 on 13 June 1925 at Villacoublay airfield in Villacoublay, France, as he was training for a Paris-to-Karachi flight, which in turn was intended as a precursor to a nonstop westbound transatlantic flight from Paris to New York City.

The first Amiot 123 was bought by the Polish Air Force in order for a first westbound transatlantic flight (in some sources, it is designated Amiot 123.01). It was named Marszałek Piłsudski (Marshal Józef Piłsudski). The crew were pilot Ludwik Idzikowski and navigator Kazimierz Kubala. They commenced their first trial of a transatlantic flight on 3 August 1928, taking off at 4:45 a.m. from Paris Le Bourget airfield. However, after flying some 3,200 km (1,990 mi; 1,730 nmi), they noticed while over the ocean that the engine's oil level was lowering, which was caused by a cracked oil tank. They decided to return to Europe, since it was more than a halfway to America, against the wind. After 31 hours of flight, when the oil in engine had depleted, Idzikowski decided to land on water by the German merchant ship Samos, about 70 km (43 mi) from the Spanish coast. The sailors rescued the crew and pulled the aircraft out of the water, but it was damaged.

Idzikowski and Kubala repeated this trial the next year. The second Amiot 123 was bought, initially built for the French pilot (according to some sources, it was still the first aircraft). It was named Orzeł Biały (the White Eagle, although according to some sources, it was still Marszałek Piłsudski). They took off on 13 July 1929, at 3:45 a.m. from Le Bourget. After flying 2,140 km (1,330 mi; 1,160 nmi), over the ocean, about 5 p.m., the engine started to lose power, becoming noisy. They decided to land on Faial Island in the Azores. However, because of more irregular engine work, at 9 p.m. (7 p.m. local time), Idzikowski decided to make an emergency landing on a closer rocky island Graciosa. During the landing on a field, the aircraft hit a low stone wall and overturned wheels up. In the crash, Ludwik Idzikowski was killed, while Kazimierz Kubala was lightly injured. During a rescue action, the aircraft burned.

== Variants ==
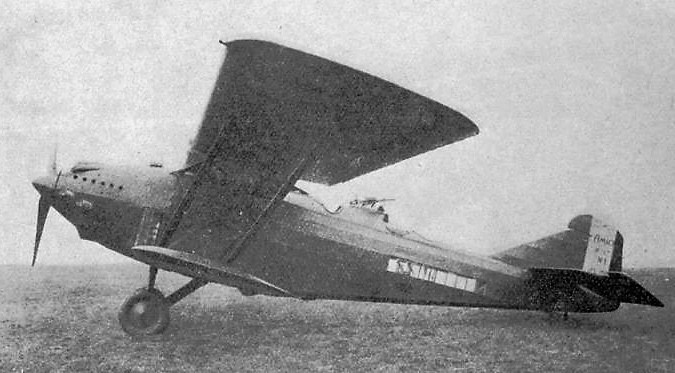
Amiot 122 BP3 photo from Annuaire de L'Aéronautique 1931

Amiot 120BN2
Two-seat light bomber prototype.
Amiot 121
Record breaking aircraft.
Amiot 122BP3
Three-seat medium-bomber aircraft.
Amiot 122S
Two-seat record breaking aircraft.
Amiot 123
Two-seat long-range record aircraft.
Amiot 124BP3
Bomber prototype.
Amiot 125BP3
Bomber prototype.

== Operators ==
Brazil
Brazilian Air Force - five bombers
France
French Air Force - 80 bombers
Poland
Polish Air Force - two sports aircraft

== Specifications (Amiot 122BP3) ==
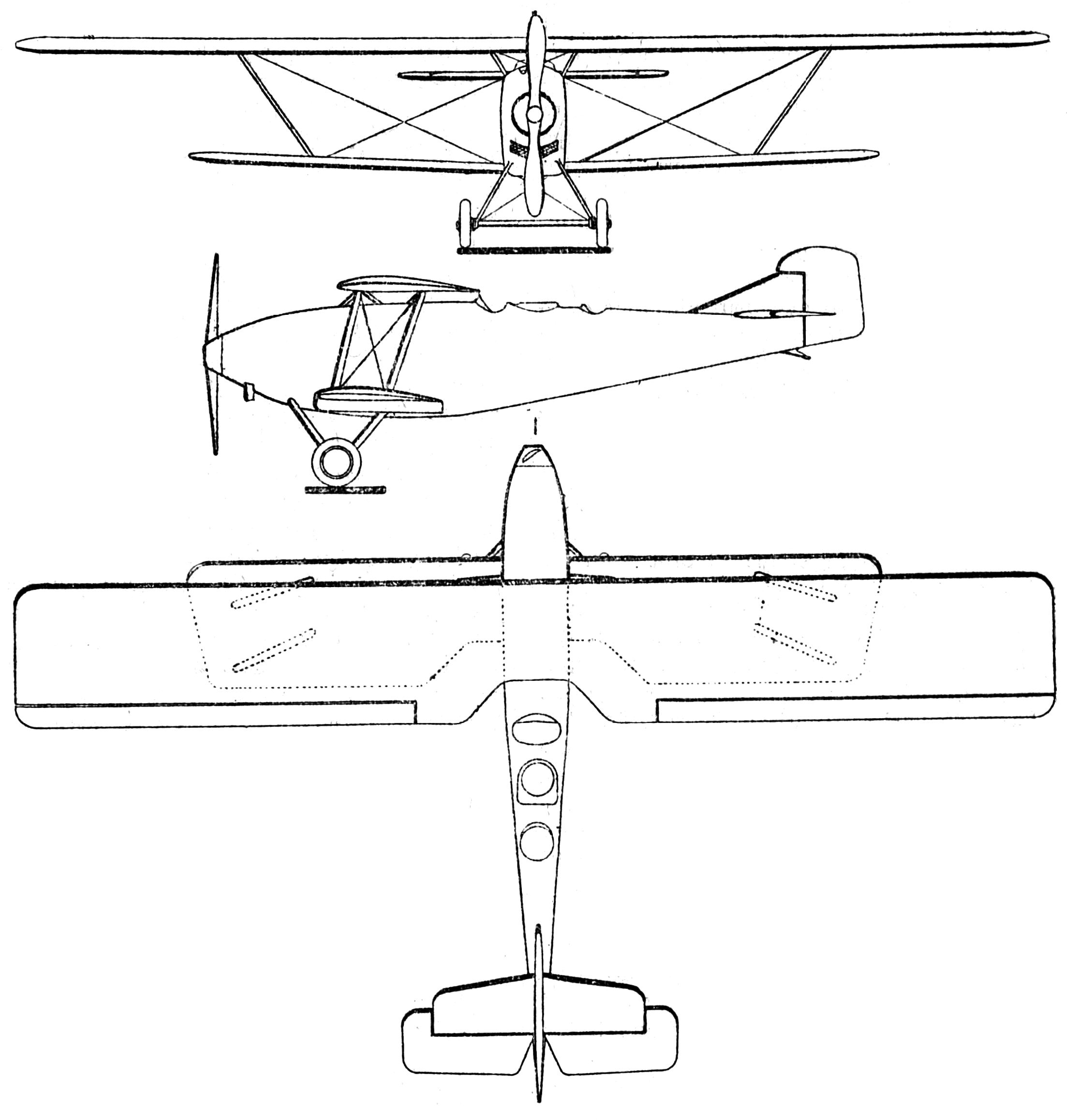
Amiot 120 3-view drawing from Les Ailes December 16,1926

Data from Jane's all the World's Aircraft 1928, Aviafrance: Avimeta 132

General characteristics

- Crew: 3
- Length: 13.72 m (45 ft 0 in)
- Wingspan: 21.5 m (70 ft 6 in)
- Height: 5.15 m (16 ft 11 in)
- Wing area: 95 m^{2} (1,020 sq ft)
- Empty weight: 2,260 kg (4,982 lb)
- Max takeoff weight: 4,200 kg (9,259 lb)
- Powerplant: 1 × Lorraine-Dietrich 18Kd W-18 water-cooled piston engine, 480 kW (650 hp)
- Propellers: 2-bladed fixed pitch propeller

Performance

- Maximum speed: 205 km/h (127 mph, 111 kn)
- Range: 1,000 km (620 mi, 540 nmi)
- Service ceiling: 6,200 m (20,300 ft)
- Time to altitude: 4,000 m (13,000 ft) in 18 minutes; 5,000 m (16,000 ft) in 29 minutes and 59 seconds
- Wing loading: 41.7 kg/m^{2} (8.5 lb/sq ft)
- Power/mass: 0.076 hp/lb (0.125 kW/kg)

Armament

- 2 × 7.7 mm (0.303 in) fixed, forward-firing machine guns
- 2 × 7.7 mm (0.303 in) flexible machine guns for observer
- 1 × 7.7 mm (0.303 in) machine gun fired through floor of observer's cockpit
- 800 kg (1,800 lb) of bombs

== See also ==
Aircraft of comparable role, configuration, and era

- Avro Aldershot
- Lublin R-VIII

Related lists

- List of military aircraft of France
- List of interwar military aircraft
- List of bomber aircraft
