= Bréguet 470 Fulgur =

French airliner

Breguet 470 Fulgur
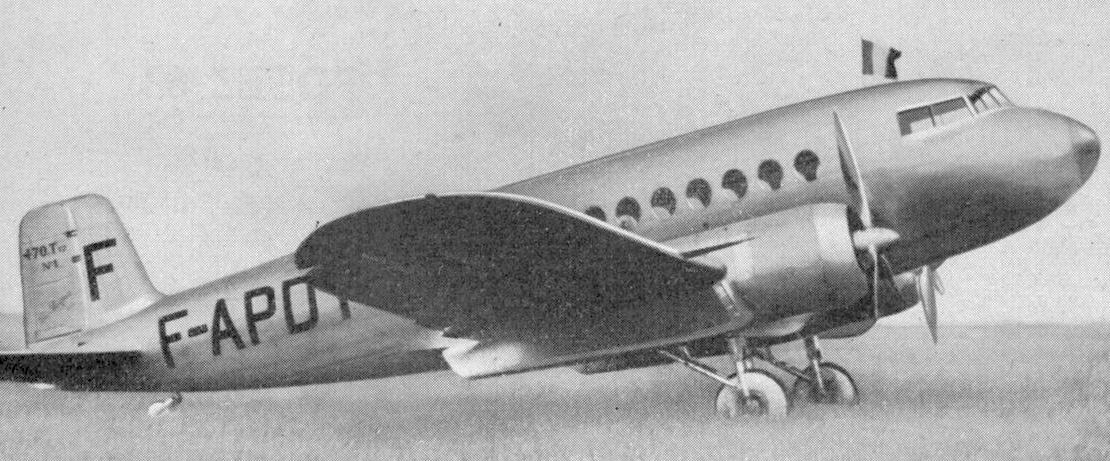

General information
- Type: Airliner
- National origin: France
- Manufacturer: Bréguet
- Primary user: Spanish Republican government
- Number built: 1

History
- First flight: 5 March 1936
- Developed from: Bréguet 460

The Bréguet 470 Fulgur was a French airliner of the 1930s. Only a single example of the twin-engined monoplane was built, this being sold to the Spanish Republican government during the Spanish Civil War.

== Development and design ==
In the early 1930s, the French company Breguet Aviation started design of a twin-engined transport aircraft, sharing the wing design with the Breguet 460 military multi-purpose aircraft, and the Breguet 462 bomber. A mockup of the initial design, designated Breguet 46T, was displayed at the 1934 Paris Air Show. The new design, named Fulgur, and redesignated Breguet 470 T12 before the prototype was completed, was a low-winged monoplane of all-metal construction, accommodating 12 passengers. It had a retractable tailwheel undercarriage and was powered by two Gnome-Rhône 14K radial engines.

The Fulgur made its first flight on 5 March 1936, and soon displayed a maximum speed of 385 km/h (239 mph), leading it to be described as the fastest commercial transport in the world.

== Operational history ==
The prototype Breguet 470 was entered in the 1936 Paris–Saigon–Paris race, with the hope of winning a large cash prize (1,800,000 Francs), and a promise that the winner would be purchased by the French Air Ministry. The 470 departed Paris on 25 October, reaching India before dropping out due to mechanical problems. It was re-engined with more powerful, 937 hp (699 kW) Gnome-Rhône 14N radials in 1937 before being entered in that year's Istres–Damascus–Paris race, finishing fifth in a time of 21:03 hours, with demilitarised Savoia-Marchetti SM.79s bombers occupying the first three places and a de Havilland Comet racer finishing fourth.

No further production followed, and the prototype was sold to the Spanish Republican government at the time of the Spanish Civil War. It was painted dark green, but the paint peeled in many places, giving the plane a scruffy look. The aircraft was used mainly for LAPE flights between Barcelona and Toulouse, although the Spanish Republican Air Force occasionally used it as a military transport as well. It escaped to France following the surrender of the Spanish Republican Armed Forces. The aircraft then was scrapped.

== Operators ==
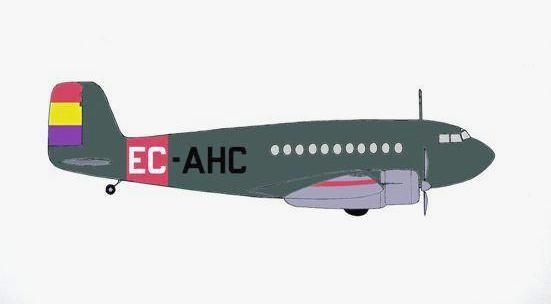
Breguet 470 Fulgur in LAPE livery

Spain

- LAPE (Líneas Aéreas Postales Españolas)

== Specifications ==
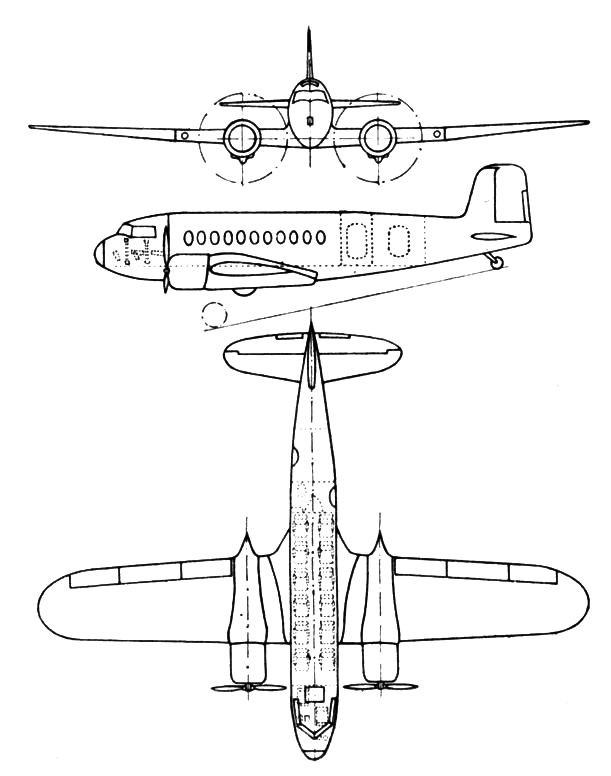
Breguet 470 3-view L'Aerophile April 1937

Data from Plane Facts:The unique Fulgur.

General characteristics

- Crew: two
- Capacity: 12 passengers
- Length: 15.93 m (52 ft 3 in)
- Wingspan: 20.50 m (67 ft 3 in)
- Height: 5.93 m (19 ft 5 in)
- Wing area: 56.25 m^{2} (605.5 sq ft)
- Empty weight: 4,840 kg (10,670 lb)
- Gross weight: 8,200 kg (18,078 lb)
- Max takeoff weight: 8,600 kg (18,960 lb)
- Powerplant: 2 × Gnome-Rhône 14Kirs 14-cylinder air-cooled radial engine, 599 kW (804 hp)815 cv each

Performance

- Maximum speed: 385 km/h (239 mph, 208 kn) at 1,600 m (5,250 ft)
- Range: 1,000 km (620 mi, 540 nmi)
- Service ceiling: 6,000 m (20,000 ft)
- Time to altitude: 7.0 min to 1,500 m (4,920 ft)

== See also ==
Related development

- Breguet 460
- Breguet-Wibault 670

Aircraft of comparable role, configuration, and era

- Lockheed Model 10 Electra
- Douglas DC-2

Related lists

- List of aircraft of the Spanish Republican Air Force
