= List of equipment of the Royal Thai Air Force =

The following is a list of Equipment of the Royal Thai Air Force, past, present, and future.

== Present aircraft ==
Photo	Aircraft	Origin	Role	RTAF Designation	Type	In service	Total	Notes
Combat aircraft
	Saab JAS 39 Gripen	Sweden	Multirole fighter	B.Kh20	JAS-39C JAS-39D JAS-39E JAS-39F	7 4 0 (+3) 0 (+1)	11 (+4)	All C/D received MS20 upgrade. 4 E/F on order 12 E/F plan.
	General Dynamics F-16 Fighting Falcon	United States	Multirole fighter	B.Kh19	F-16A ADF F-16B ADF F-16A OCU F-16B OCU F-16AM MLU F-16BM MLU	8 1 11 4 12 6	42	Current Main Fighter Jet of the Royal Thai Air Force
	Northrop F-5	United States	Multirole fighter	B.Kh18	F-5TH F-5THF	11 2	13	13 from 33 of F-5E/F upgraded to F-5TH Super Tigris standards. One F-5TH 2-seat (21105) crashed in 2021. All expected to retire within 2031.
	Dornier Alpha Jet	Germany	Light attack	B.J7	Alpha Jet TH	14	14	14 planned to upgrade to Alpha Jet TH standards. All expected to retired within 2031.
	Beechcraft AT-6 Wolverine	United States	Light attack	B.J8	AT-6TH	7	7	2 delivered, 1 crashed in training accident
Electronic-warfare aircraft
	Saab 340 AEW&C	Sweden	Airborne early warning and control	B.K1	S100B Argus	2	2	Equipped with Erieye radar.
	Saab 340	Sweden	Signals intelligence	B.TL17	SAAB 340B SIGINT	2	2	Equipped with ELINT/COMINT systems.
Aerial Refueling
RSAF_A330_MRTT_760	Airbus A330 MRTT	France	Aerial Refueling	—	A330 MRTT+	0 (+1)	0 (+1)	
Reconnaissance
	Piaggio P.180 Avanti	Italy	Reconnaissance	B.TL20	Avanti II EVO	1	1	
	Fairchild AU-23 Peacemaker	United States	Reconnaissance	B.JT2	AU-23A	14	14	Equipped with EO/IR sensors.
	Diamond DA42 Twin Star	Austria	Reconnaissance	B.TF20	DA42MPP / DA42 M-NG	11	11	Equipped with EO/IR sensors.
Transport
	Lockheed C-130 Hercules	United States	Tactical airlift	B.L8	C-130H C-130H-30	6 6	12	Upgraded with a new glass cockpit and safety systems.
	Airbus C295	Spain	Tactical airlift	—	C295	0 (+2)	0 (+2)	6-8 plan
	Basler BT-67	United States	Tactical airlift	B.L2	BT-67	8	8	Modified DC-3 used for firefighting/seeding. One lost in 2006.
	Saab 340	Sweden	Transport	B.L17	340B	3	3	
	ATR 72	France / Italy	VIP/Transport	B.L16	ATR-72-500 ATR-72-600	3 3	6	
	Boeing 737	United States	VIP Transport	B.L11	737-4Z6 BBJ 737-8Z6 BBJ	2 2	4	
	Airbus A319	Germany	VIP/Transport	B.L15	A319-115CJ	1	1	
	Airbus A320	France	VIP/Transport	B.L15	A320-200ACJ	2	2	
	Airbus A340	France	VIP/Transport	B.L19	A340-500	1	1	Former Thai Airways (HS-TLC).
	Sukhoi Superjet 100	Russia	VIP/Transport	B.L18	SSJ100-95LR	3	3	
Helicopters
	Bell 412	United States	VIP/Utility	H.6	412EP	6	6	2 retired in October 2021.
	Sikorsky S-92 Superhawk	United States	VIP/Med Evac	H.10	S-92A	5	5	
	Sikorsky S-70	United States	VIP/Utility	H.12	S-70i	5	5	
	Eurocopter EC725	France	CSAR/Utility	H.11	EC725 / H225M	12 (+2)	12 (+2)	
Trainer aircraft
	KAI T-50 Golden Eagle	South Korea	Light attack/Lead-in fighter trainer	B.KhF2	FA-50TH T-50TH	6 8	14	First 4 delivered in April 2018.
	Cessna T-41 Mescalero	United States	Trainer aircraft	B.F14	T-41D	6	6	
	PAC CT/4 Airtrainer	New Zealand	Trainer aircraft	B.F16	CT-4A/E	24	24	
	Diamond DA42 Twin Star	Austria	Trainer aircraft	B.F20	DA42	18	18	
	Diamond DA40 Diamond Star	Austria	Trainer aircraft	B.F21	DA40NG	8	8	
	Beechcraft T-6 Texan II	United States	Trainer aircraft	B.F22	T-6TH	12	12	
	Eurocopter EC135	France	Helicopter trainer	H.13	H135	6	6	
Unmanned aerial vehicle
	Aeronautics Defense Dominator	Israel	Reconnaissance	BR.T3	Dominator XP	3	3	Equipped with EO/IR sensors.
	Aerostar Tactical UAS	Israel	Reconnaissance	BR.T1	Aerostar BP	8	8	Equipped with EO/IR sensors. One lost in the 2025 Cambodia-Thailand conflict
	Tigershark II	Thailand	Reconnaissance	BR.AF1	Tigershark II	Unknown	Unknown	
	RTAF U-1	Thailand	Reconnaissance	BR.TF1	RTAF U1	17	17	Equipped with EO/IR sensors.
	Sapura Cybereye	Malaysia	Reconnaissance	—	Cybereye II	3	3	Equipped with EO/IR sensors.
	RTAF KB-2E/M	Thailand	Kamikaze UAV	—	KB-2E/M	Unknown	Unknown	Equipped with Warhead 2kg.
	RTAF KB-5E	Thailand	Kamikaze UAV	—	KB-5E	80	80	Equipped with Warhead 5kg.
	RTAF KB-10G	Thailand	Kamikaze UAV	—	KB-10G	Unknown	Unknown	Equipped with Warhead 10kg.
	UDS Avenger 5	Lithuania	Loitering munition UAV	—	Avenger 5	10 system	10 system	Equipped with Warhead 5kg.
Earth observation satellite
	NAPA-1	Thailand	Earth observation satellite	RTAF-SAT-1	—	1	1	First Thai RTAF satellite. Launched via Vega VV16 in 2020.
	NAPA-2	Thailand	Earth observation satellite	RTAF-SAT-2	—	1	1	

== Surface-to-air missile ==
Photo	Name	Origin	Role	Type	In service	Total	Notes
Surface-to-air missile
Military_parade_in_Baku_June_26,_2018_(2)	Barak MX	Israel	High to medium air defense	Barak ER	0 (+2)	0 (+2)	3 systems planned
Chinese_KS-1_SAM_mobile_launcher	KS-1C	China	High to medium air defense	KS-1C	2 systems	2 systems	
Australian_RBS-70_team_during_Exercise_Talisman_Sabre_21	RBS 70	Sweden	Man-portable air-defense system	RBS 70	Unknown	Unknown	
QW-2 MANPADS	FN-16	China	Man-portable air-defense system	FN-16	Unknown	Unknown	
QW-2 MANPADS	QW-2	China	Man-portable air-defense system	QW-2	Unknown	Unknown	

== Anti-aircraft gun ==
Photo	Name	Origin	Role	Type	In service	Total	Notes
Anti-aircraft gun
Artemis 30	Mauser Mk 30	Germany	Anti-aircraft gun	30mm. Twin AA gun	8	8	
37 mm automatic air defense gun M1939 (61-K)	Type 74	China	Anti-aircraft gun	37mm. Twin AA gun	Unknown	Unknown	
	Bofors 40L70	Sweden	Anti-aircraft gun	40mm. AA gun	Unknown	Unknown	
M2 Browning	Twin M2HB	USA	Anti-aircraft gun	12.7mm. Twin AA gun	Unknown	Unknown	

== Armament ==
Photo	Name	Origin	Type	Notes
Air-to-air missile
Rafael_Python_4	Python 4/3	Israel	Short range infrared homing missile	120 obtained.
20180328_AIM-120_Udvar-Hazy	AIM-120C AMRAAM	United States	Beyond-visual-range missile	Initial 50 missiles.
Aim_9	AIM-9E/J/P/M Sidewinder	United States	Short range infrared homing missile	600 missiles obtained.
DATM-2000_IRIS-T_dummy_trolley_Schleswig_AB_2025	IRIS-T	Germany	Short range infrared homing missile	40 units – employs a thrust vector control motor.
ILA_2008_PD_446	Meteor	France	Beyond-visual-range missile	Future operators.
Air-to-surface missile
Rb15	RBS 15	Sweden	Anti-ship missile	25 missiles obtained.
Rampage	Rampage	Israel	Standoff weapon	20 missiles to be obtained.
AGM-65_Maverick_MG_1382	AGM-65D/G Maverick	United States	Infrared imaging AGM	200 missiles obtained.
Air-to-ground weaponry
Korea_GPS_Guided_Bomb_at_ADAS_2018	KGGB	South Korea	GPS-guided bomb kit	Attached to MK-82.
2023-05-12_Lizard_III_LGB_002	Lizard 4	Israel	GPS/INS and Laser-guided bomb kit	Attached to MK-82, MK-84 and MPR500.
2023-05-12_Lizard_III_LGB_002	Lizard 3	Israel	Laser-guided bomb kit	Attached to MK-82, MK-84 and MPR500.
GBU-10_xxl	GBU-10F/B Paveway II	United States	Laser-guided bomb	2000-pound
GBU-12_xxl	GBU-12E/B Paveway II	United States	Laser-guided bomb	500-pound
MPR500	MPR500	Israel	bunker buster	500-pound
Mk._81_250-lb_and_Mk._82_Snakeye_I_500-lb	Mark 81 bomb	United States	Low-drag general-purpose bomb	250-pound
Mk-82_xxl	Mark 82 bomb	United States	Low-drag general-purpose bomb	500-pound
Mark-84_bomb	Mark 84 bomb	United States	Low-drag general-purpose bomb	2000-pound
	BLU-10	United States	Napalm bomb	250-pound
	BLU-23/BLU-32	United States	Napalm bomb	500-pound
	BLU-27	United States	Napalm bomb	750-pound
Rockeye_Cluster_Bomb	Mk20 Rockeye II	United States	Cluster bomb	750-pound
	CBU-71A/B	United States	Cluster bomb	750-pound
AGM-114_and_Hydra_70	Hydra 70	United States	Unguided rocket	
	MK66	Thailand	Unguided rocket	

== Future aircraft ==
Aircraft	Origin	Type	Variant	On order	Notes
Combat aircraft
JAS 39 Gripen	Sweden	Multirole combat aircraft	JAS 39E/F	(+12)	12 Gripen E/F's have been selected to replace the F-16s of 102 Squadron, Wing 1, Korat Royal Thai Air Force Base
F-5 or Alpha Jet replacement	Unknown	Multirole combat aircraft	Unknown	Unknown	Set to begin with FY2031 budget according to 2025 RTAF Whitepaper.
403 Squadron F-16 replacement	Unknown	Multirole combat aircraft	Unknown	Unknown	Set to begin with FY2036 budget according to 2025 RTAF Whitepaper. Will be a Fifth-generation fighter.
Transport aircraft
Airbus A330 MRTT	Europe	Transport / Tanker	Airbus A330 MRTT+	(+1)	Set to replace the Airbus A340-500. Contract is expected to be signed by the end of 2025 with delivery commencing in 2028-2029.
Airbus C295	Spain	Transport	Airbus C295	(+2)	Set to replace the Basler BT-67. Delivery is expected in 2029.
ATR 72-500 replacement	Unknown	Transport	Unknown	Unknown	Set to begin with FY2031 budget according to 2025 RTAF Whitepaper.
Helicopters
Airbus H225M	Europe	VIP / utility / CSAR	Unknown	(+2)	2 additional H225M Medium Sized VIP Helicopters with utility and CSAR capabilities from Airbus Helicopters ordered

== Historic aircraft ==
Aircraft of the Royal Thai Air Force and its precursors, the Siamese Flying Corps (1914–1919), Royal Siamese Air Service (RSAS) (1919–1937) and Royal Siamese Air Force (RSAF) (1937–1939).

Aircraft type	Origin	Designation	Role	Service period	# used	Notes
F-16 Block 15	US	B.Kh19	fighter	1988-present	5	30 still in service.
RTAF-6	Thailand	B.TO6	trainer	2017-?	3	
Aeritalia G.222	Italy	B.L14	transport	1995–2012	6	3 traded for Saab 340B
Aermacchi SF.260	Italy	B.F15	trainer	1973–1999	18	locally built
Aero Commander 690	US	B.PhTh4	reconnaissance	1982–1988	1	
Aero L-39ZA/ART Albatros	Czechoslovakia	B.KhF1	trainer	1994–2021	37	one L-39 crashed in July 11 2019
Airbus A310-324	France	B.L13	transport	1991–2016	1	
Avro 504N	UK	B.F4	trainer	1930–1948	70+	50+ built locally
Beechcraft Bonanza	US	B.S5	transport	1951–1962	3	Ex-Royal Thai Navy
Beechcraft C-45B/F	US	B.L1	transport	1947–1971	7	First transport
Beechcraft King Air	US	B.PhTh3	reconnaissance	1982–1989	1	
Beechcraft Queen Air	US	B.PhTh2	reconnaissance	1971–1989	3	
Bell 47/OH-13H	US	B.H7	helicopter	1972–1973	9	
Bell 206B Jet Ranger	US	B.H8/B.HPhT1	helicopter	1982–2006	7	1 ex-Thai Army
Bell 212/UH-1N	US	B.H6k	helicopter	1976–1999	2	
Bell UH-1 Iroquois	US	B.H6	helicopter	1968–2021	31	Received 31, 18 lost
Boeing 100E	US	B.Kh7	fighter	1931–1949	2	comparison testing
Boripatra	Siam	B.Th2	bomber	1927–1940	4+	local design
Breguet 14	France	B.Th1	bomber	1919–1937	40+	built locally
Breguet III	France	n/a	trainer	1913–?	5	
Bristol Bulldog	UK	B.Kh6	fighter	1930–1940	2	comparison testing
Cessna 150	US	B.Ph1	trainer	1971–2004	6	
Cessna 170B	US	B.S7	transport	1954–1959	9	
Cessna 411	US	B.PhTh1	reconnaissance	1982–1989	2	
Cessna A-37	US	B.J6	attack	1972–1994	20	
Cessna O-1 Bird Dog	US	B.T2	reconnaissance	1967–1990	54	
Cessna T-37B/C Tweet	US	B.F12	trainer	1961–1996	22	
Consolidated PT-1	US	B.F3	trainer	1928–1939	4	
Curtiss Hawk 75N	US	B.Kh11	fighter	1939–1949	12	ordered 25, received 12
Curtiss Hawk II	US	B.Kh9	fighter	1934–1949	12	
Curtiss Hawk III	US	B.Kh10	fighter	1935–1949	74+	
Curtiss SB2C-5 Helldiver	US	B.J3	attack	1951–1955	6	Ex-Royal Thai Navy
de Havilland Canada DHC-1 Chipmunk	Canada	B.F9	trainer	1950–1989	66	
de Havilland DH.82A Tiger Moth	UK	B.F10	trainer	1951–1961	34	
Douglas C-47 & EC-47D	US	B.L2	transport	1947–1997	55	B.L2k still in service
Douglas C-54/DC-4	US	B.L3	transport	1959–1966	2	
Douglas DC-8-62AF	US	B.L10	transport	1979–1989	3	
Eurocopter AS332L-2 Super Puma	France	B.H9	helicopter	1996–2002	3	
Fairchild 24	US	B.S1	transport	1938–1950	13 ca.	
Fairchild C-123B/K	US	B.L4	transport	1964–1995	46	
Fairey Firefly FR.1 & T.2	UK	B.J4	attack	1951–1955	12	later target tug
GAF N.22B Nomad	Australia	B.L9	transport/reconnaissance	1982–2015	22	
Grob G 109	Germany	B.R2	trainer	1989–1994	2	motor glider
Grumman F8F-1 Bearcat	US	B.Kh15	fighter	1951–1963	207	
Grumman Widgeon	US	B.S6	transport	1951–1956	5	
Heinkel HD 43	Germany	B.Kh8	fighter	1930–1940	2	comparison testing
Helio Courier	US	B.Th1	transport	1963–1986	20	
Hiller 360/UH-12	US	B.H2	helicopter	1950–1952	5	
Hoffman H-36 Dimona	Austria	B.R1	trainer	1983–1994	10 ca.	motor glider
Kaman HH-43 Huskie	US	B.H5	helicopter	1962–1970	4	
Kawasaki KH-4	Japan	B.HPhT2	reconnaissance helicopter	1982–1985	1	ex-Thai Army
Lockheed T-33A/RT-33A	US	B.F11	trainer	1955–1996	54	
Martin 139WSM & 166	US	B.Th3	bomber	1937–1949	15	9 ex-Dutch 166s via Japan
Miles Magister	UK	B.F7	trainer	1947–1952	20	
Mitsubishi Ki-21	Japan	B.Th4	bomber	1940–1949	9	
Mitsubishi Ki-30	Japan	B.J2	attack	1940–1951	25	
Nakajima Ki-27	Japan	B.Kh12	fighter	1942–1945	12	
Nakajima Ki-43	Japan	B.Kh13	fighter	1943–1949	24	
Nieuport 17 & 21	France	B.Kh1	fighter	1918–1927	4+	
Nieuport 24bis	France	B.Kh2	fighter	1918–1932	12+	
Nieuport 80	France	B.F1	trainer	1918–1935	12 ca.	
Nieuport 83	France	B.F2	trainer	1918–1935	12 ca.	
Nieuport II & IV	France	n/a	trainer	1913–?	4	
Nieuport-Delage NiD 29	France	B.Kh4	fighter	1923–1936	12+	built locally
North American F-86F/L Sabre	US	B.Kh17	fighter	1961–1972	74	
North American T-6 Texan	US	B.F8	trainer	1948–1974	220	
North American T-28D	US	B.F13	trainer	1962–1988	120	
Northrop F-5A/B/C & RF-5A Freedom Fighter	US	B.Kh18	fighter	1967–2000	29	Variants in service.
PAC CT/4 Airtrainer	New Zealand	B.F16	trainer	1999–2018	24	
Percival Prince	UK	B.T1	reconnaissance	1952–1962	1	
Pilatus PC-9	Switzerland	B.F19	trainer	1991-2023	22	
Piper L-4 Cub/Piper PA-11	US	B.S3	transport	1947–1962	44	
Prajadhipok	Siam	B.Kh5	fighter	1929–?	1	local design
Rearwin 9000	US	B.S2	transport	1938–1947	2	
Republic F-84G Thunderjet	US	B.Kh16	fighter	1956–1963	34	
RFB Fantrainer 400 & 600	Germany	B.F18	trainer	1988–1994	26	
Rockwell OV-10C Bronco	US	B.J5	attack	1971–2004	32	to Philippine AF
RTAF-4	Thailand	B.F17	trainer	1974–1989	13 ca.	locally built
Sikorsky S-51/H-5	US	B.H1	helicopter	1950–1954	4	
Sikorsky S-55/H-19	US	B.H3	helicopter	1954–1965	11	
Sikorsky S-58/S-58T/H-34	US	B.H4	helicopter	1962–2003	65	
SPAD VII & XIII	France	B.Kh3	fighter	1919–1931	32+	
Stinson L-5 & L-5B	US	B.S4	transport	1947–1959	10	
Supermarine Spitfire FR.14/PR.19	UK	B.Kh14	fighter	1951–1955	34	
Tachikawa Ki-36	Japan	B.F6	trainer	1942–1950	24	
Vought V-93S Corsair	US	B.J1/B.F5	attack/trainer	1934–1950	84+	Locally built/modified

=== Gallery ===
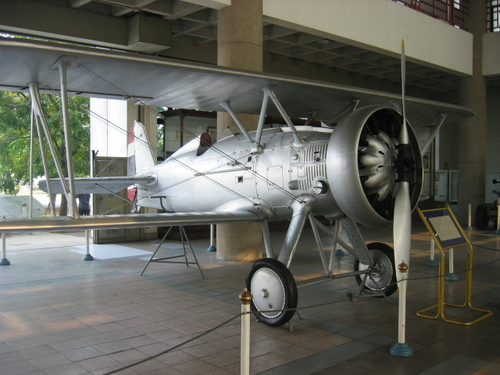
Royal Thai Air Force Boeing 100E

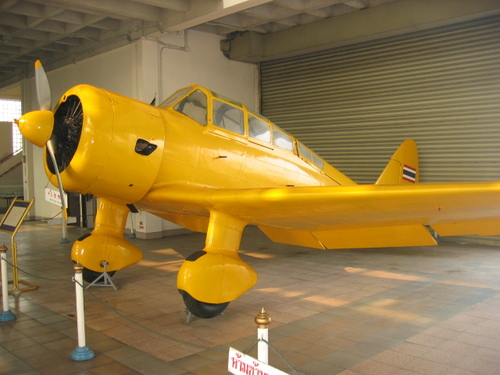
RTAF Tachikawa Ki-36

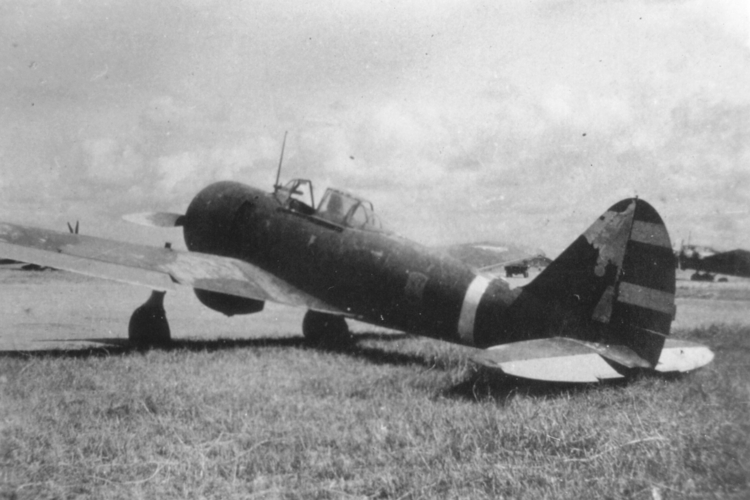
RTAF Nakajima Ki-27

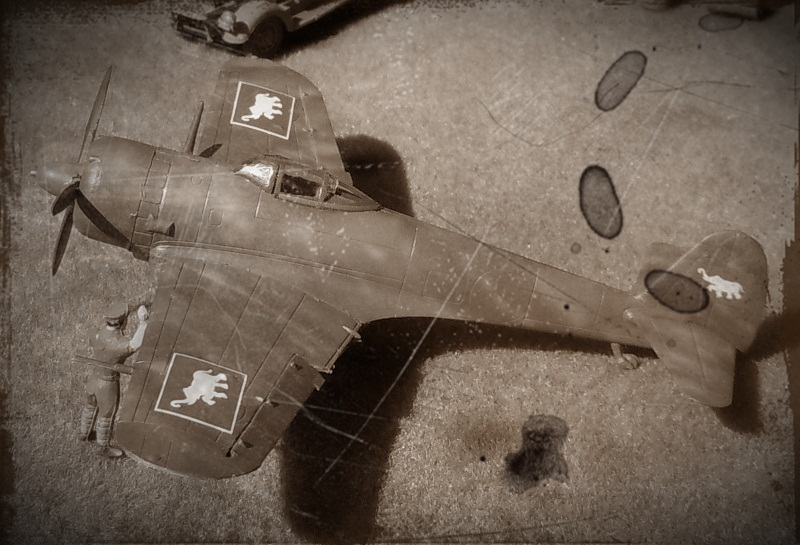
model of RTAF Nakajima Ki-43

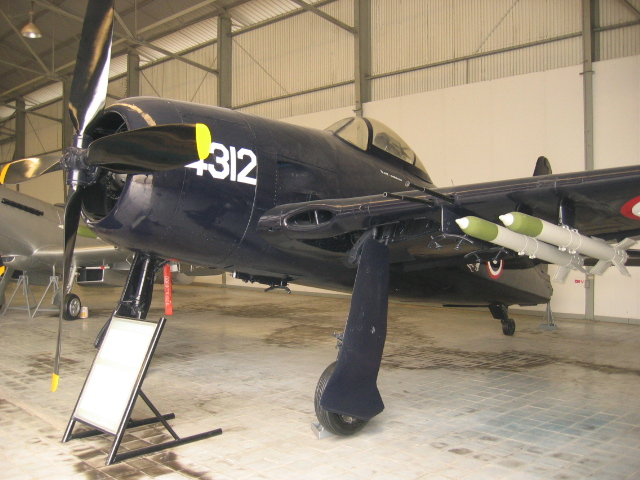
RTAF Grumman F8F-1 Bearcat

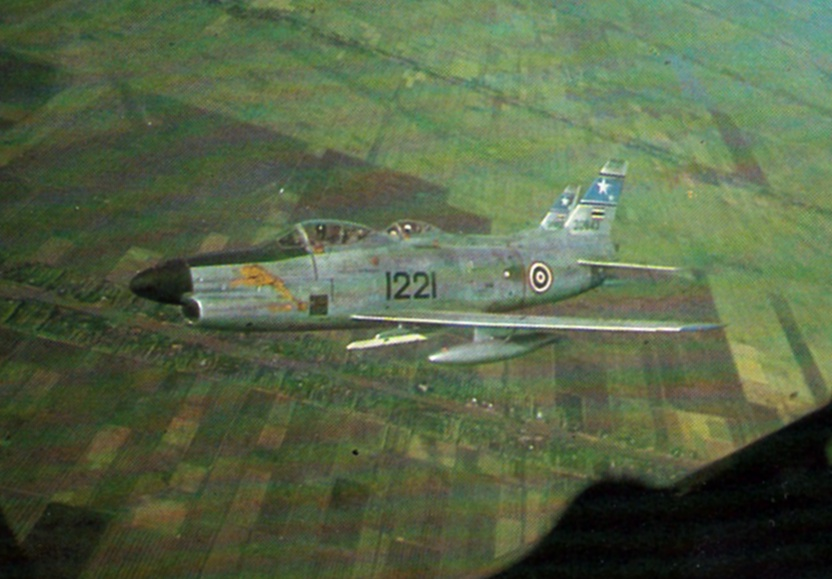
North American F-86L Sabre of the RTAF in flight

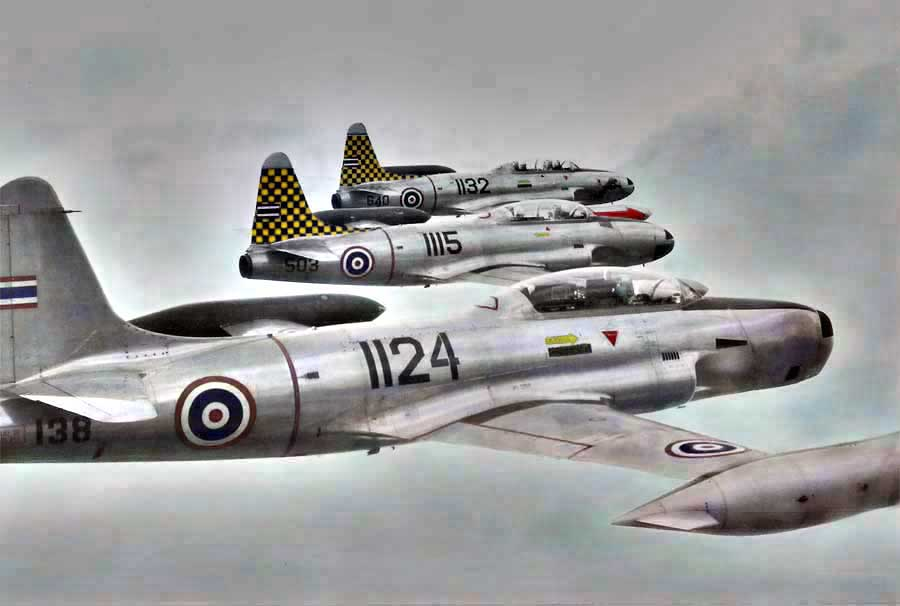
Royal Thai Air Force T-33A

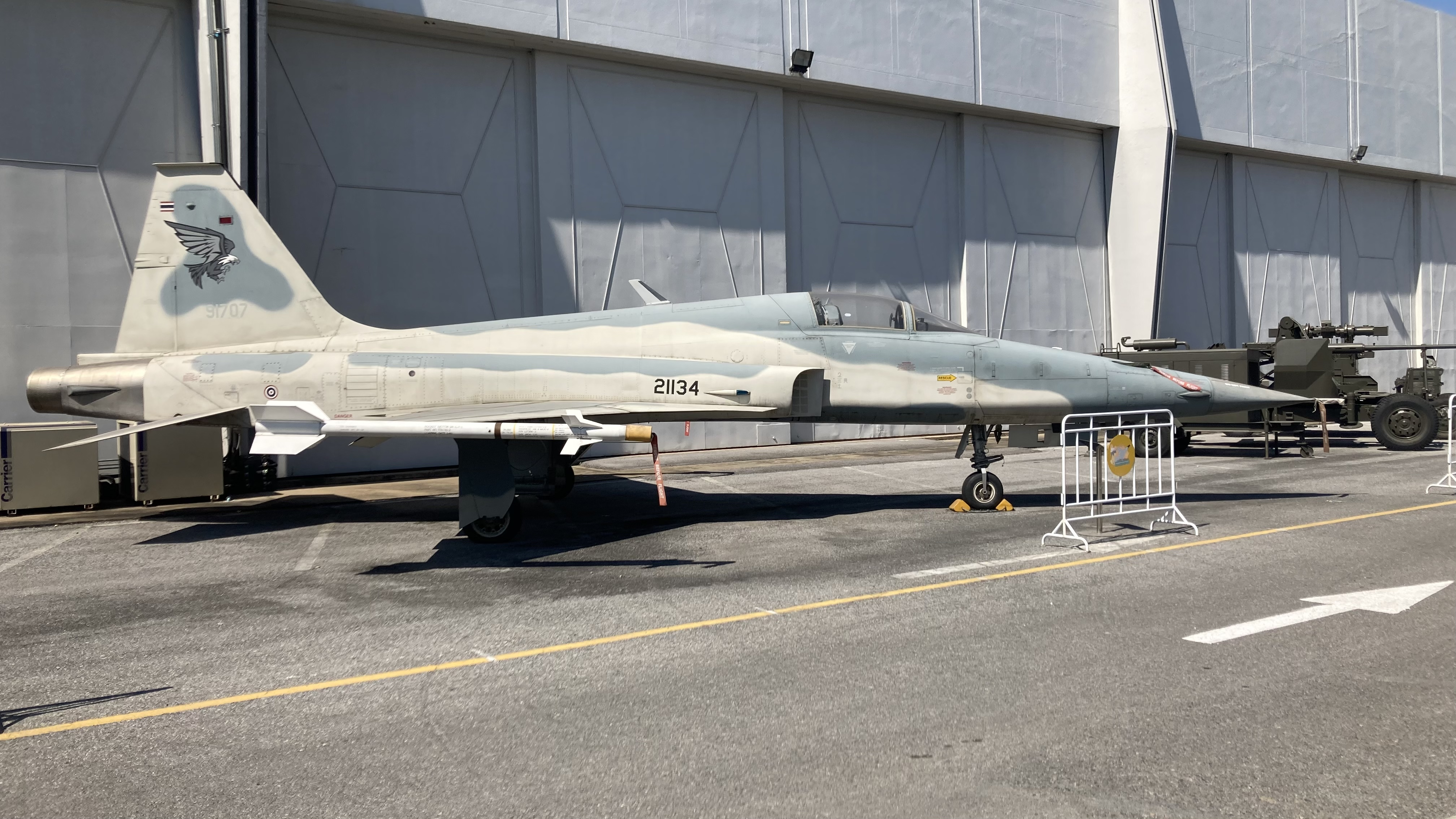
Decommissioned Northrop F-5E Tiger II of the RTAF at the Royal Thai Air Force Museum

== See also ==
- Royal Thai Air Force Museum
- Military of Thailand
- Royal Thai Army
- Royal Thai Navy
