= Boripatra =

1927 light bomber aircraft

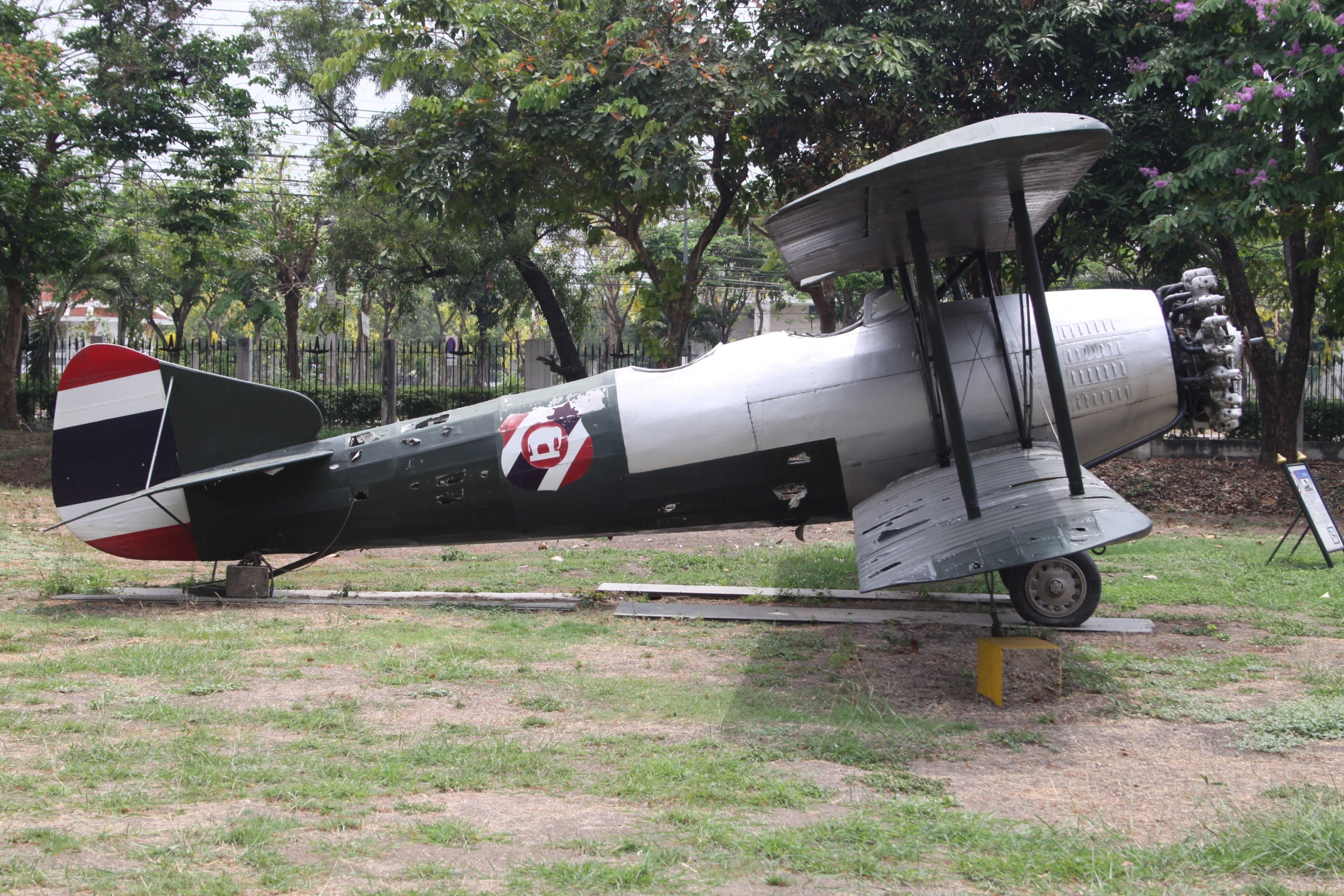
- Boripatra replica at Don Mueang air base

General information
- Type: Light bomber
- Manufacturer: Royal Siamese Air Force Aeronautical Workshops
- Designer: Lieutenant Colonel Luang Vejayanrangsrit (Munee Mahasantana)
- Status: retired
- Primary user: Directorate of Air Force, Royal Siamese Army
- Number built: <12

History
- Introduction date: 1927
- First flight: 23 June 1927

The Baribatra (Thai: บริพัตร, also spelled Boripatra or Boriphat) or B.Th.2 was a two-seater light bomber aircraft of the 1920s designed and built by the Royal Siamese Air Force's Aeronautical Workshops. A small number were built for the Thai Air Force, with the type being the first Thai-designed aircraft.

== Design and development ==
The standard bomber aircraft of the Royal Siamese Air Service in the 1920s was the Breguet 14, which was license-built by the Air Service's Aeronautical Workshops as the B.Th.1 at Don Muang, powered by surplus 300 hp (224 kW) Renault engines purchased from France. In 1927, the price of Renault engines was raised by the supplier, and it was decided to investigate fitting the Breguets with alternative engines. In order to investigate the characteristics of possible engines, it was decided to build a test bed aircraft, which might also act as a replacement for the Breguet. Design of the new aircraft, designated B.Th.2, was assigned to Major Luang Vejayanrangsrit, the assistant director of the Aeronautical Workshops, and later commander of the Royal Siamese Air Force.

The Bomber Type Two was a conventional single-bay biplane of mixed construction, with a steel-tube fuselage structure. The forward fuselage was covered by metal panels and the rear fuselage fabric covering, while the wings had a fabric covered wooden structure (using local wood). The construction of the first prototype, powered by a 450 hp (336 kW) Bristol Jupiter radial engine, began on April 5, 1927, with it making its maiden flight on June 23, 1927.

Shortly after the first flight, the aircraft was named Boripatra (pronounced Boripat) by King Prajadhipok after his half brother, Prince Paribatra Sukhumbandhu, the then Minister of Defence.

A second Boripatra flew later that year, with the Jupiter replaced by a 660 hp (492 kW) BMW VI V12 engine. Boripatras were also flown with Curtiss D-12 engines and possibly a Pratt & Whitney Wasp. While the Boripatra had superior performance to the Breguet 14, it did not replace the older aircraft, as the price of Renault engines dropped to its earlier level, allowing the Breguets to continue to be supported. Less than twelve Boripatras were built.

== Operational use ==
In December 1929, three Boripatras set off on a goodwill visit to British India. One crashed fatally shortly after setting off, but the other two reached Rangoon on 24 December that year and Calcutta on 28 December. A second aircraft crashed when flying to Allahabad, but the third completed the planned journey to Delhi. A more successful visit was made to Hanoi, French Indochina by two Boripatras during 1930-31. The Boripatra was replaced by the Vought Corsair in the 1930s, with at least one remaining in existence in 1938.

== Variants ==
B.ThO.1
(Thai: บ.ทอ.๑) Original designation of the Boripatra, indicating that it was manufactured in Thailand.
B.Th.2
(Thai: บ.ท.๒) Redesignated B.ThO.1, indicating that it was a bomber.

== Replicas ==
Two replica Boripatras are displayed at the Royal Thai Air Force Museum in Bangkok.

== Specifications (1st prototype - Jupiter engine) ==
Data from A Siamese Experimental

General characteristics

- Crew: 2
- Length: 8.76 m (28 ft 9 in)
- Wingspan: 13.41 m (44 ft 0 in)
- Height: 3.18 m (10 ft 5 in)
- Gross weight: 1,846 kg (4,070 lb)
- Powerplant: 1 × Bristol Jupiter VI radial engine, 340 kW (450 hp)

Performance

- Maximum speed: 253 km/h (157 mph, 137 kn)

== See also ==
- Prajadhipok

== Notes and references ==
Notes

Bibliography

- Young, Edward M. "A Siamese Experimental". Air Enthusiast, Nineteen, August–November 1982. Bromley, UK: Pilot Press. ISSN 0143-5450. pp. 78–80.
