= Royal Thai Air Force Museum BTS station =

Rapid transit station in Bangkok

Royal Thai Air Force Museum พิพิธภัณฑ์กองทัพอากาศ
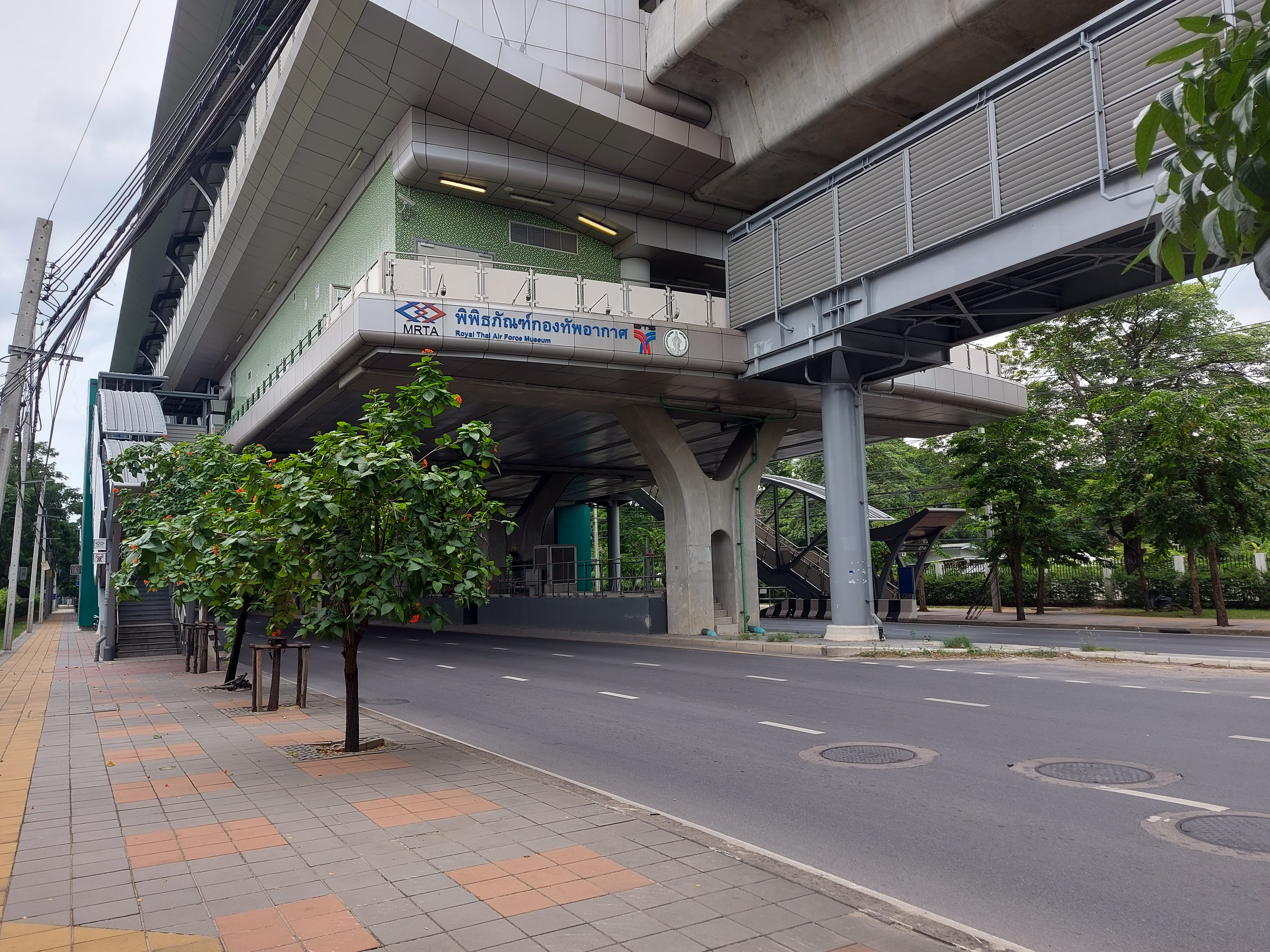

General information
- Location: Don Mueang and Sai Mai, Bangkok, Thailand
- Coordinates: 13.9180°N 100.6217°E
- System: BTS
- Owner: Bangkok Metropolitan Administration (BMA)
- Operator: Bangkok Mass Transit System; Public Company Limited (BTSC)
- Line: Sukhumvit Line

Other information
- Station code: N22

History
- Opened: 16 December 2020

Passengers
- 2021: 171,534

Services
Preceding station	BTS Skytrain	Following station
Yaek Kor Por Aor towards Khu Khot	Sukhumvit Line	Bhumibol Adulyadej Hospital towards Kheha
Location

Royal Thai Air Force Museum Station Traditional sign

Royal Thai Air Force Museum Station (Thai: สถานีพิพิธภัณฑ์กองทัพอากาศ, RTGS: Sathani Phiphitthaphan Kong Thap Akat) is a BTS Skytrain station, on the Sukhumvit Line in Bangkok, Thailand. It is located in front of the Royal Thai Air Force Museum. The station is part of the northern extension of the Sukhumvit Line and opened on 16 December 2020, as part of phase 4.

In 2021, it was the least used station on the BTS network.

== See also ==
- Bangkok Skytrain
