= Tachikawa Ki-36 =

Japanese army cooperation aircraft

Ki-36
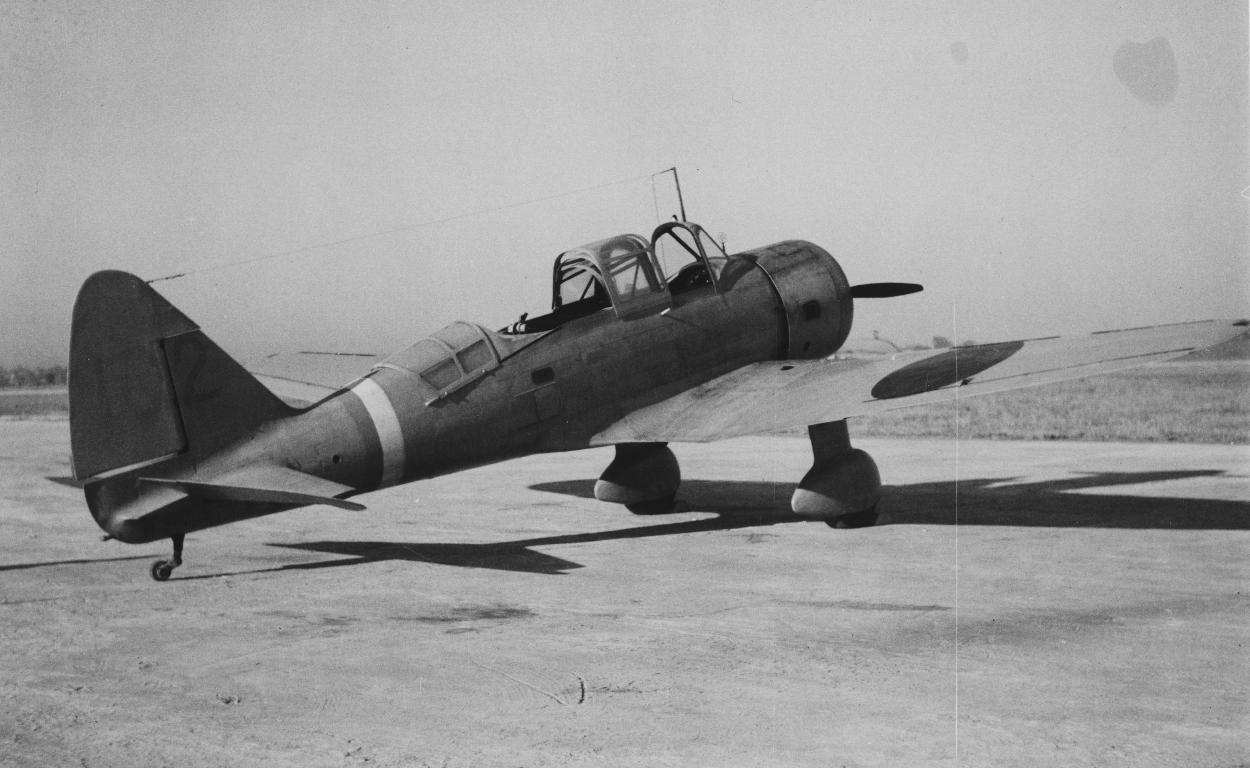

General information
- Type: Two-seat Army Co-operation Aircraft
- Manufacturer: Tachikawa Aircraft Company Ltd
- Primary users: Imperial Japanese Army Air Service Royal Thai Air Force; Indonesian Air Force
- Number built: 1,334

History
- Manufactured: 1938 - 1944
- First flight: 20 April 1938
- Variant: Tachikawa Ki-55

The Tachikawa Ki-36 (named Ida in Allied reporting code) is an army cooperation aircraft designed and produced by the Japanese aviation manufacturer Tachikawa Aircraft Company Ltd. Designated as the Army Type 98 Direct Co-operation Aircraft by the Imperial Japanese Army Air Service (IJAAS), it was a twin-seat, low-wing monoplane with a single piston engine and fixed conventional undercarriage with a tailwheel.

Designed during the late 1930s in response to a specification for a new army cooperation aircraft suitable for austere airstrips, observation, and light attack duties to be adopted by the Imperial Japanese Army (IJA), the Ki-36 was a fairly conventional aircraft for the era, featuring sizable control surfaces, a relatively lightweight airframe, and large wing area. The first prototype made its maiden flight on 20 April 1938 and promptly demonstrated satisfactory performance without major modifications being needed. Selected to fulfil the requirement, quantity production of the Ki-36 commenced in November 1938. It was primarily operated by the IJAAS, which used it to perform combat mission during both the Second Sino-Japanese War and World War II. Late on in the conflict, numerous aircraft were used to conduct kamikaze missions. Several Ki-36s were operated by both the Royal Thai Air Force and the Indonesian Air Force. A derivative of the aircraft, designated Ki-55, was developed as a dedicated trainer.

== Design and development ==
The origins of the Ki-36 can be traced back to May 1937 and the issuing of a specification by the Koku Hombu (Note: Koku Hombu was the Technical Branch of the Imperial Army Air Headquarters.) that sought a dedicated twin-seat army cooperation aircraft. Specifics of this specification included the use of a single-engine monoplane configuration, compatibility with austere landing strips close to the front lines, favourable downward visibility, and high agility when flown at low altitude. Furthermore, the envisioned aircraft was also to incorporate provisions for photographic and radio apparatus alongside bomb racks compatible with light anti-personnel bombs. Tachikawa Aircraft Company Ltd was one of several Japanese manufacturers to produce responses to this specification; following an evaluation of the submitted proposals, the Koku Hombu authorised Tachikawa to proceed with the construction of prototypes.

Tachikawa's design team, headed by Ryokichi Endo, opted for a relatively orthodox low-wing monoplane configuration combined with a fixed spatted undercarriage. Efforts were made by the designers to keep the airframe as light as was practically possible which, in combination with the relatively large wing area, achieved a low wing loading. Sizable elevators and rudder were fitted to the aircraft. Despite the cockpit being positioned directly above the wings, both the forwards and downwards field of view for the pilot was generous, in part due to the sweepback of the leading edge of the wings, while the observer's vision was aided by a series of large windows underneath the wing's centre section.

On 20 April 1938, the first prototype, which was powered by a 450 hp (336 kW) Hitachi Army Type 98 Ha-13 engine, performed its maiden flight. It demonstrated satisfactory performance throughout the test flight programme, including a relatively brisk takeoff capability. While the first prototype experienced wingtip stall, fixed leading edge slots near the wingtips were present on the second prototype as a corrective measure. Both prototypes were armed with a fixed forward-firing machine gun, a flexibly-mounted rear-facing machine gun, and underwing racks that could accommodate up to ten bombs. Relatively few changes were made between these prototypes and the initial production model of the aircraft.

Having outperformed the Mitsubishi Ki-35 in comparative trials, the Ki-36 was designated the Army Type 98 Direct Co-operation Aircraft and ordered into production in November 1938. Initially produced by Tachikawa alone, a second assembly line was established by Kawasaki in 1940. Late production aircraft had improved stall characteristics due to the addition of a slight wing wash-out. On account of the aircraft's favourable handling qualities, it was decided to produce a dedicated trainer derivative of the Ki-36, designated Ki-55.

In January 1944, production was terminated after the completion of 1,334 Ki-36s, 862 of these by Tachikawa and 472 by Kawasaki.

== Operational history ==
In IJAAS service, the Ki-36 was typically deployed in small detachments to certain ground units of the Imperial Japanese Army (IJA). It first saw combat during the Second Sino-Japanese War, where its ability to operate from compact airstrips close to the contact line was appreciated by various Japanese ground commanders. According to the aviation historian René J. Francillon, the presence of the Ki-36 negatively impacted the morale of Chinese forces opposed to the Japanese, and was a relatively successful aircraft in this theatre.

Early on in the Pacific War, the Ki-36 suffered heavy losses during most encounters with Allied aerial forces. Having proved to be vulnerable to opposing fighters, the type was promptly redeployed to the comparatively more favourable Chinese front instead. Towards the end of the conflict, the Ki-36 was employed as a kamikaze aircraft with a bomb of 500-kg (1,102-lb) fitted externally.

== Variants ==
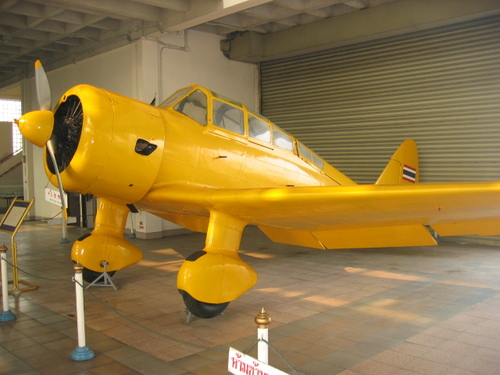
A preservice Ki-55 trainer at the Royal Thai Air Force Museum.

- Ki-55: Two-seat advanced trainer version.
- Ki-72: An evolved version with a 600-hp (447-kW) Hitachi Ha-38 engine and retractable undercarriage. Not built.
- B.F.6: (Thai: บ.ฝ.๖) Royal Thai Air Force designation for the Ki-36.

== Operators ==
China

- Chinese Communist Air Force operated two captured aircraft postwar as trainers until their retirement in early 1950s.

Indonesia

- Indonesian Air Force (then called Indonesian People's Security Force)

Japan

- Imperial Japanese Army Air Force

Thailand

- Royal Thai Air Force

== Specifications (Ki-36) ==
Data from Japanese Aircraft of the Pacific War, The Concise Guide to Axis Aircraft of World War II

General characteristics

- Crew: 2
- Length: 8 m (26 ft 3 in)
- Wingspan: 11.8 m (38 ft 9 in)
- Height: 3.64 m (11 ft 11 in)
- Wing area: 20 m^{2} (220 sq ft)
- Airfoil: root: NACA 23014; tip: NACA 23006
- Empty weight: 1,247 kg (2,749 lb)
- Gross weight: 1,660 kg (3,660 lb)
- Powerplant: 1 × Hitachi Ha13a (Army Type 98 450hp Air Cooled Radial) nine-cylinder air-cooled radial piston engine, 380 kW (510 hp) for take-off

350 kW (470 hp) at 1,700 m (5,600 ft)

Performance

- Maximum speed: 348 km/h (216 mph, 188 kn)
- Cruise speed: 235 km/h (146 mph, 127 kn)
- Range: 1,235 km (767 mi, 667 nmi)
- Service ceiling: 8,150 m (26,740 ft)
- Time to altitude: 3,000 m (9,800 ft) in six minutes and 39 seconds
- Wing loading: 83 kg/m^{2} (17 lb/sq ft)
- Power/mass: 0.23 kW/kg (0.14 hp/lb)

Armament

- Guns: one fixed, forward-firing 7.7 mm (0.303 in) Type 89 machine gun, one flexible 7.7 mm (0.303 in) Type 89 machine gun in the rear cockpit.
- Bombs: up to 350 kg (772 lb) external bombload

== See also ==
Related development

- Tachikawa Ki-55

Related lists

- List of military aircraft of Japan
