= RTAF-4 =

RTAF-4 Chanthra
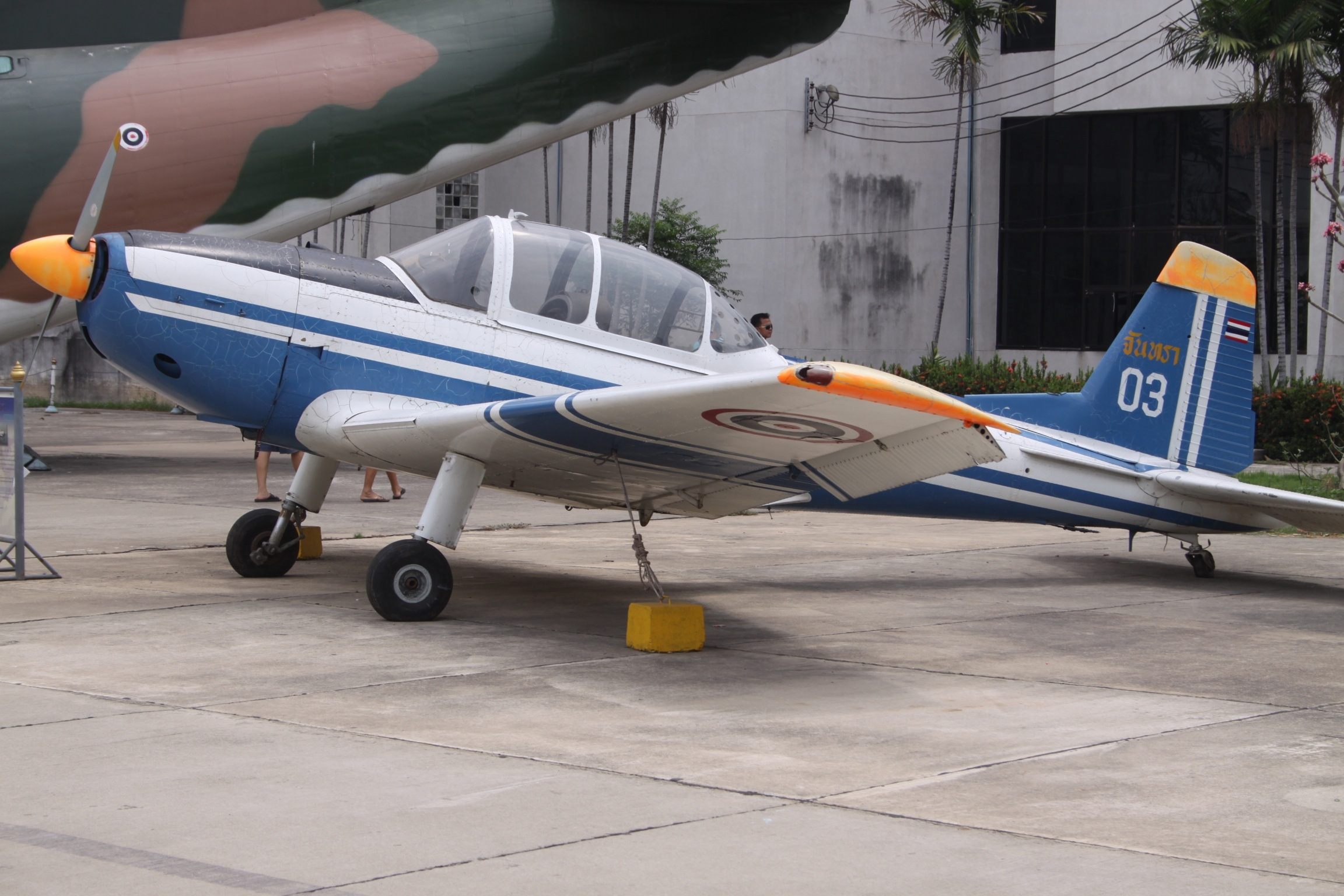

General information
- Type: Trainer aircraft
- National origin: Thailand
- Manufacturer: RTAF Science and Weapon Systems Development Centre
- Primary user: Royal Thai Air Force
- Number built: 12

History
- First flight: 1972
- Developed from: de Havilland Canada DHC-1 Chipmunk

The RTAF-4 Chanthra (Thai: จันทรา), officially designated B.ThO.4 (Thai: บ.ทอ.๔) and later B.F.17 (Thai: บ.ฝ.๑๗), is a single-engine two-seat, single-engined primary trainer aircraft built by the Royal Thai Air Force's Science and Weapon Systems Development Centre.

== Design and development ==
The RTAF-4 was developed from the de Havilland Canada DHC-1 Chipmunk that were used by the Royal Thai Air Force. Production began in February 1971 and the prototype made its first flight on 25 September 1972. The plane, with redesigned cockpit and tail sections, had a payload of 345 kg and its maximum gross weight for aerobatics was 1,044 kg. 12 aircraft were produced, that entered into service in 1974, four of which were used as trainers for the Civil Aviation Department of the Thai Air Force.

One unit has been preserved at the Royal Thai Air Force Museum, Don Mueang, Bangkok.

== Operators ==
Thailand

- Royal Thai Air Force

== Aircraft on display ==
- Royal Thai Air Force Museum near Bangkok. Serial BF 03 (บ.ฝ. ๑๗).

== Specifications ==
Data from ทอ.4 จันทรา

General characteristics

- Crew: two; student & instructor
- Length: 7.80 m (25 ft 7 in)
- Wingspan: 10.55 m (34 ft 7 in)
- Height: 2.41 m (7 ft 11 in)
- Empty weight: 744.5 kg (1,641 lb)
- Gross weight: 1,090 kg (2,403 lb)
- Powerplant: 1 × Continental IO-360 , 160 kW (210 hp)
- Propellers: two-bladed

Performance

- Maximum speed: 258 km/h (160 mph, 139 kn)
- Cruise speed: 225 km/h (140 mph, 121 kn)
- Range: 1,014 km (630 mi, 548 nmi) with full passenger load
- Ferry range: 1,720 km (1,070 mi, 930 nmi)
- Service ceiling: 5,000 m (16,000 ft)
- Rate of climb: 365 m/s (71,900 ft/min)

== See also ==
Related development

- de Havilland Canada DHC-1 Chipmunk

Related lists

- List of aircraft (R)
