= Royal Thai Air Force Museum =

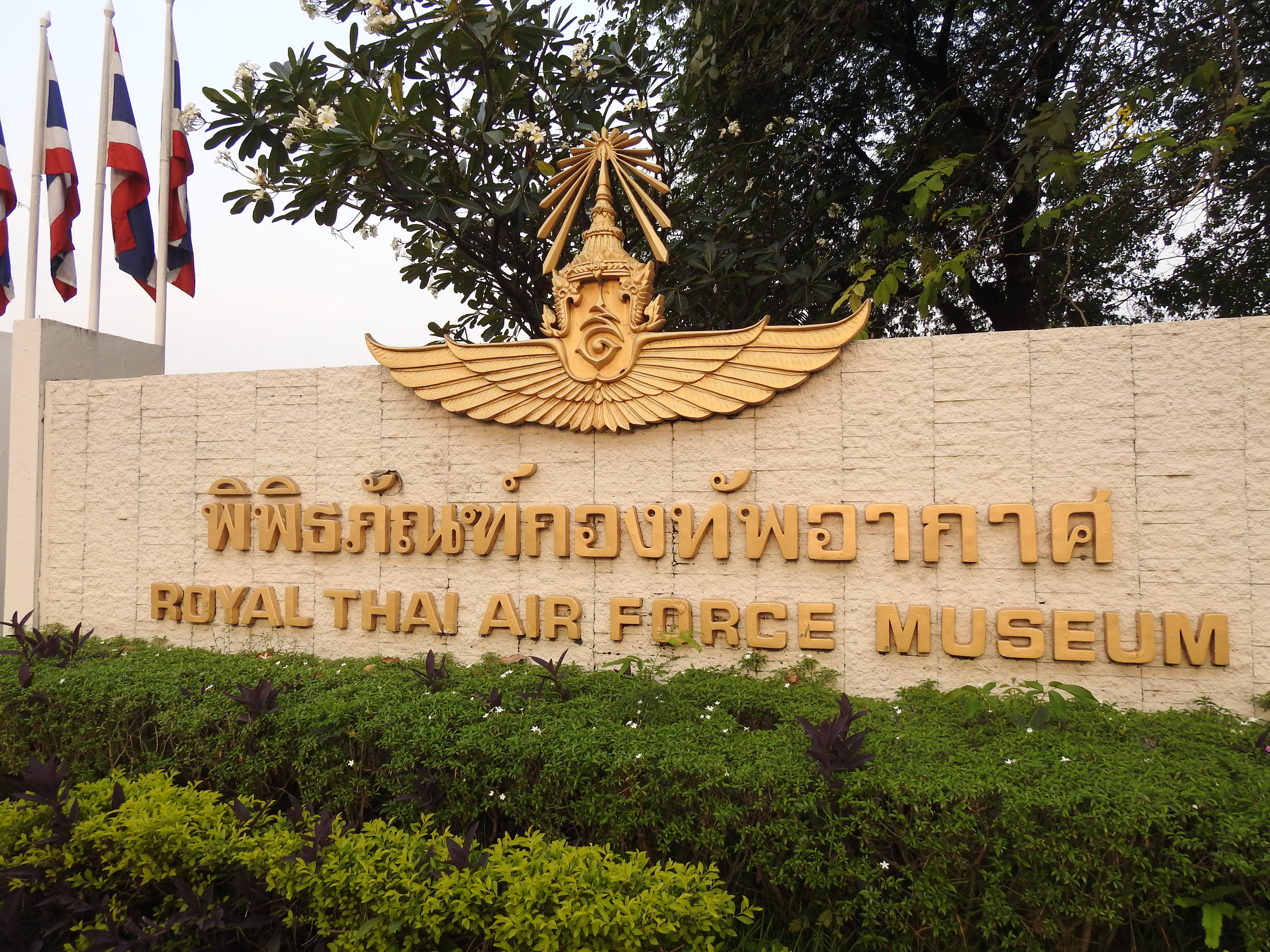
- Entrance to the museum

- Location in Thailand
- Established: 1952
- Location: Don Muang Royal Thai Air Force Base, Bangkok
- Coordinates: 13.9198°N 100.6218°E
- Type: Military Aviation Museum
- Owner: Royal Thai Air Force
- Public transit access: Royal Thai Air Force Museum BTS Station (BTS Sukhumvit line)
- Website: www.museum.rtaf.mi.th

The National Aviation Museum of the Royal Thai Air Force (Thai: พิพิธภัณฑ์กองทัพอากาศและการบินแห่งชาติ) is located in Don Muang Royal Thai Air Force Base in Don Mueang district, Bangkok, Thailand. It is located on the Phahonyothin Road just to the south of Wing 6 of the domestic terminal of the Don Mueang Airport. It has been served by the Royal Thai Air Force Museum BTS station since 16 December 2020.

== Overview ==
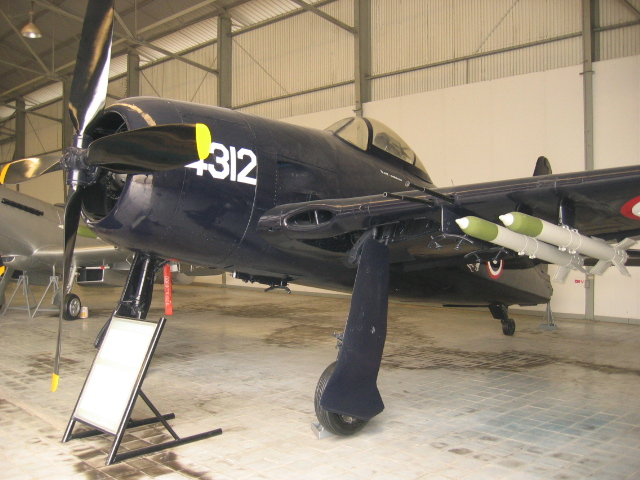
Grumman F8F Bearcat at the Royal Thai Air Force Museum

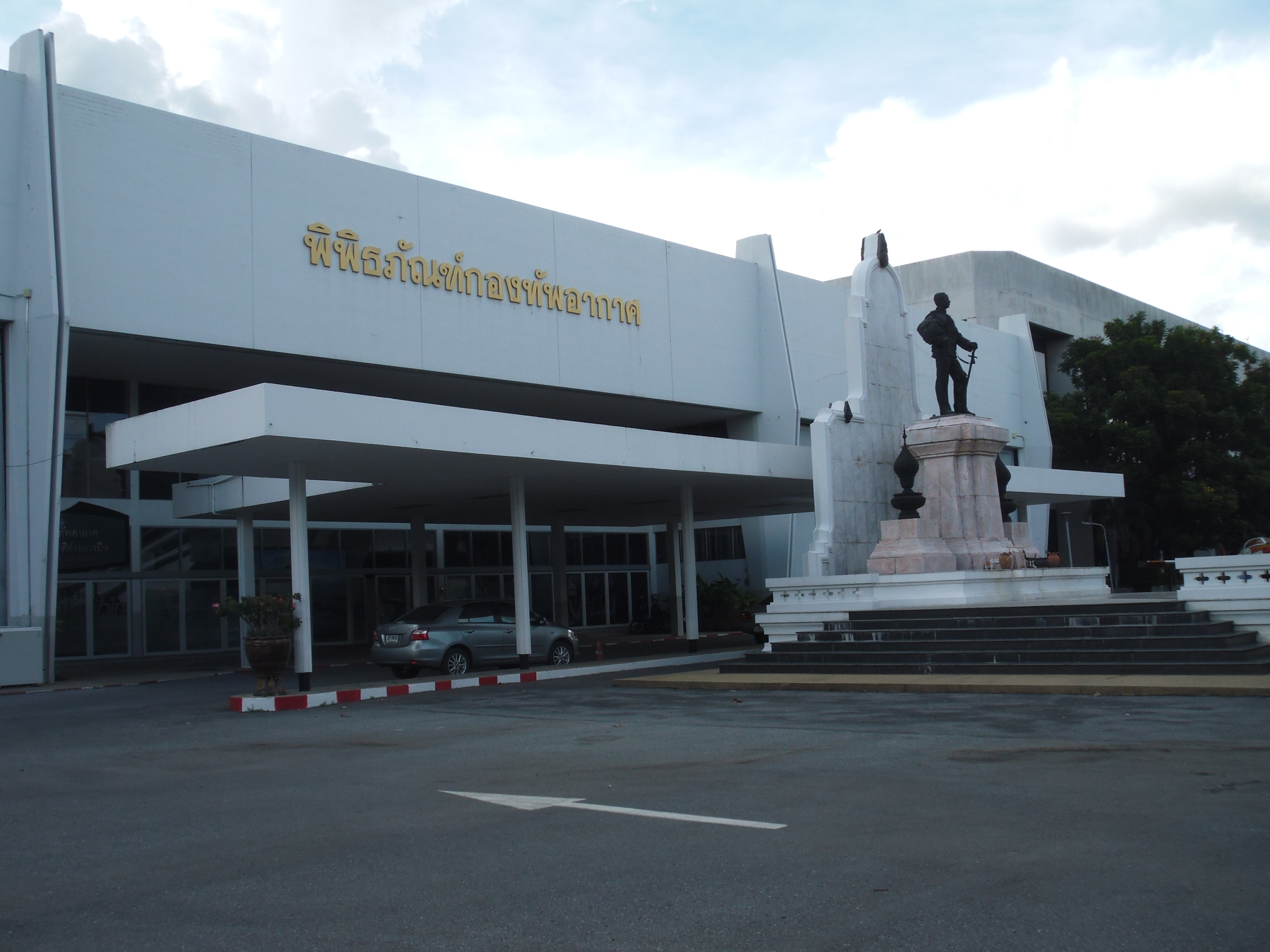
in front of the museum

The museum was established in 1952 to collect, preserve and restore various airplanes and other aviation equipment used by the Royal Thai Air Force. In addition to one F11C and other rare aircraft, the museum's collection also includes one of only two surviving Japanese Tachikawa Ki-36 trainers, the last surviving Vought O2U Corsair, one of three surviving Curtiss BF2C Goshawks, a Spitfire and several Nieuports and Breguets.

The museum provides details of Thailand's role in World War II. Imperial Japanese forces landed at various points in Thailand on 8 December 1941, and after resisting for one day, the Thai forces were ordered to cease fire and allow Japanese forces to pass through the kingdom. The Thai government of Field Marshal Pibun Songkram would also declare war on both Britain and the United States in January 1942 (though the declaration was never delivered to the US by the Thai ambassador), and Thailand remained technically a Japanese ally until the Japanese surrender in August 1945, despite the existence of a large anti-Japanese underground. The museum contains several paintings of Thai fighter aircraft intercepting attacking US B-29s, P-38s and P-51s.

Pro-Japanese, anti British poster at the museum

=== Renovation ===
Since 2012, the Royal Thai Air Force Museum has received basic repair. In 2020 the Royal Thai Air Force Museum renovated the Air Force Museum building area to prepare for the Royal Thai Air Force Academic Seminar 2020. The objectives of the renovation is to create an understanding of the RTAF Strategic Direction / Position, which recognizes the national defense industry in accordance with government policy which will lead to concrete Thailand 4.0 and raise awareness in the development of Sustainable and Smart Air Force with transparency and also enhance knowledge in every dimension (All Domains) in the development of the Air Force and listen to opinions from relevant parties to be a guideline for mobilization of national forces For the development of the Air Force.

== Aircraft on display ==
Thai Type	Foreign Model	RTAF Serial Number
Attacker Type 3	Curtiss SB2C-5 Helldiver	J3-4/94
Attacker Type 4	Fairey Firefly	J4-11/94
Attacker Type 5	Rockwell OV-10C Bronco	J5-10/14
Attacker Type 6	Cessna A-37B Dragonfly	J6-12/15
Attacker Type 6	Cessna A-37B Dragonfly	J6-13/15
Bomber Type 1	Breguet 14	Replica
Bomber Type 2	Boripatra	...
Cargo Type 1	Beechcraft C-45 Expeditor	...
Cargo Type 2	Douglas C-47 Skytrain	...
Cargo Type 4	Fairchild C-123B Provider	L4-6/07
Cargo Type 11	Boeing 737	L11-1/26
Communications Type 1	Fairchild 24	...
Fighter Type 7	Boeing Model 100E	...
Fighter Type 10	Curtiss Hawk III	...
Fighter Type 11	Curtiss Hawk 75N	...
Fighter Type 14	Supermarine Spitfire XIV	Kh14-1/93
Fighter Type 15	Grumman F8F-1 Bearcat	Kh15-178/98
Fighter Type 16	Republic F-84G Thunderjet	Kh16-06/99
Fighter Type 17	North American F-86F Sabre	Kh17-10/04
Fighter Type 17A	North American F-86L Sabre	Kh17k-5/06
Fighter Type 18	Northrop F-5A Freedom Fighter	N/A (Note: This airframe never served with the RTAF.)
Fighter Type 18	Northrop F-5A Freedom Fighter	Kh18-13/17
Fighter and Observation Type 18	Northrop RF-5A Freedom Fighter	TKh18-3/13
Fighter Type 18B	Northrop F-5B Freedom Fighter	Kh18k-1/09
Helicopter Type 1	Westland WS-51 Dragonfly	H1-4/96
Helicopter Type 1A	Sikorsky YR-5A	H1k-1/96
Helicopter Type 2A	Hiller UH-12B Raven	H2k-4/96
Helicopter Type 3	Sikorsky H-19A Chickasaw	H3-3/97
Helicopter Type 4	Sikorsky H-34 Choctaw	...
Helicopter Type 4A	Sikorsky S-58T	H4k-64/30
Helicopter Type 5	Kaman HH-43B Huskie	H5-2/05
Helicopter Type 6	Bell UH-1H Iroquois	...
Helicopter Type 6A	Bell 212	...
Helicopter Type 6B	Bell 412	...
Helicopter Type 6C	Bell 412SP	...
Helicopter Type 6D	Bell 412EP	...
Helicopter Type 7	Bell OH-13H Sioux	H7-9/15
Helicopter Type 8	Bell 206B-3 JetRanger III	H8-01/38
Helicopter Type 9	Eurocopter AS-332L-2 Super Puma II	...
Liaison Type 3	Piper L-4	S3-4/90
Liaison Type 4	Stinson L-5 Sentinel	S4-10/90
Liaison Type 5	Beechcraft Bonanza 35	...
Liaison Type 6	Grumman G-44A Widgeon	...
Mapping Helicopter Type 1	Bell 206B JetRanger	...
Mapping Helicopter Type 2	Kawasaki KH-4	...
Observation and Attacker Type 1	Vought V-93S	...
Observation Type 2	Cessna O-1A Bird Dog	T2-27/15
Observation Type 2	Cessna O-1E Bird Dog	T2-29/15
Trainer Type 6	Tachikawa Ki-55	...
Trainer Type 8	North American T-6F Texan	F8-99/94
Trainer Type 8	North American T-6G Texan	...
Trainer Type 9	de Havilland Canada DHC-1 Chipmunk	...
Trainer Type 10	de Havilland Tiger Moth	...
Trainer Type 11	Lockheed T-33 Shooting Star	F11-23/13
Trainer and Observation Type 11	Lockheed RT-33 Shooting Star	TF11-5/10
Trainer and Observation Type 11	Lockheed RT-33 Shooting Star	TF11-8/13
Trainer and Attacker Type 13	North American T-28 Trojan	JF13-106/14
Trainer Type 17	RTAF-4	F17-3/17
Trainer Type 18	RFB Fantrainer	F18-01/27
Trainer Type 18	RFB Fantrainer	F18k-15/32
Utility Type 1	Helio U-10B Courier	...
N/A (Note: This aircraft type predates the designation sequence.)	Breguet Type III	Replica
N/A (Note: This aircraft type was never operated by the RTAF.)	Douglas A-1 Skyraider	N/A
N/A (Note: This aircraft type was never operated by the RTAF.)	Mikoyan-Gurevich MiG-21	N/A
...	Pazmany PL-2	...
...	RTAF-2	...
...	RTAF-5	...

== Gallery ==
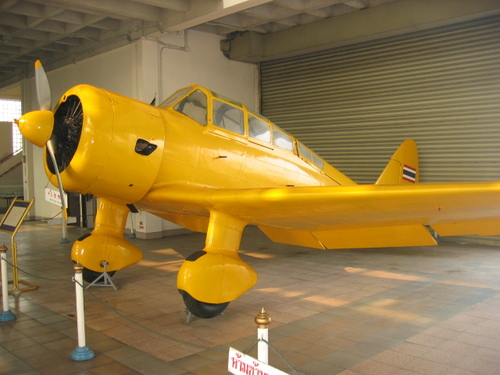
Tachikawa Ki-36

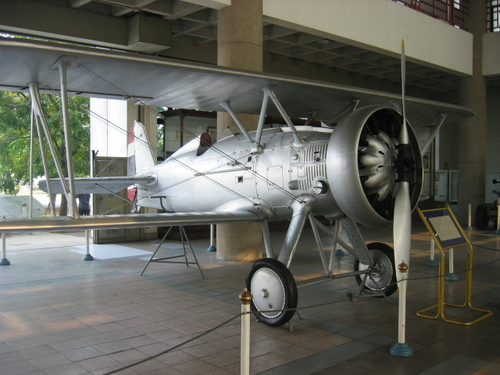
Boeing 100E

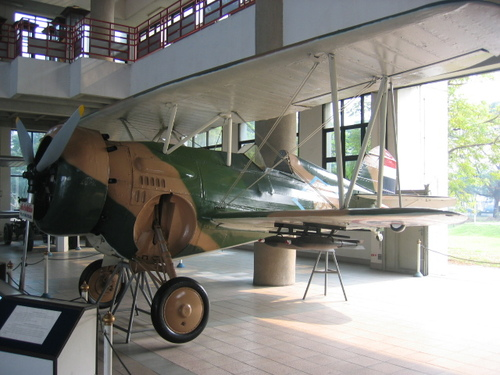
Curtiss BF2C Goshawk

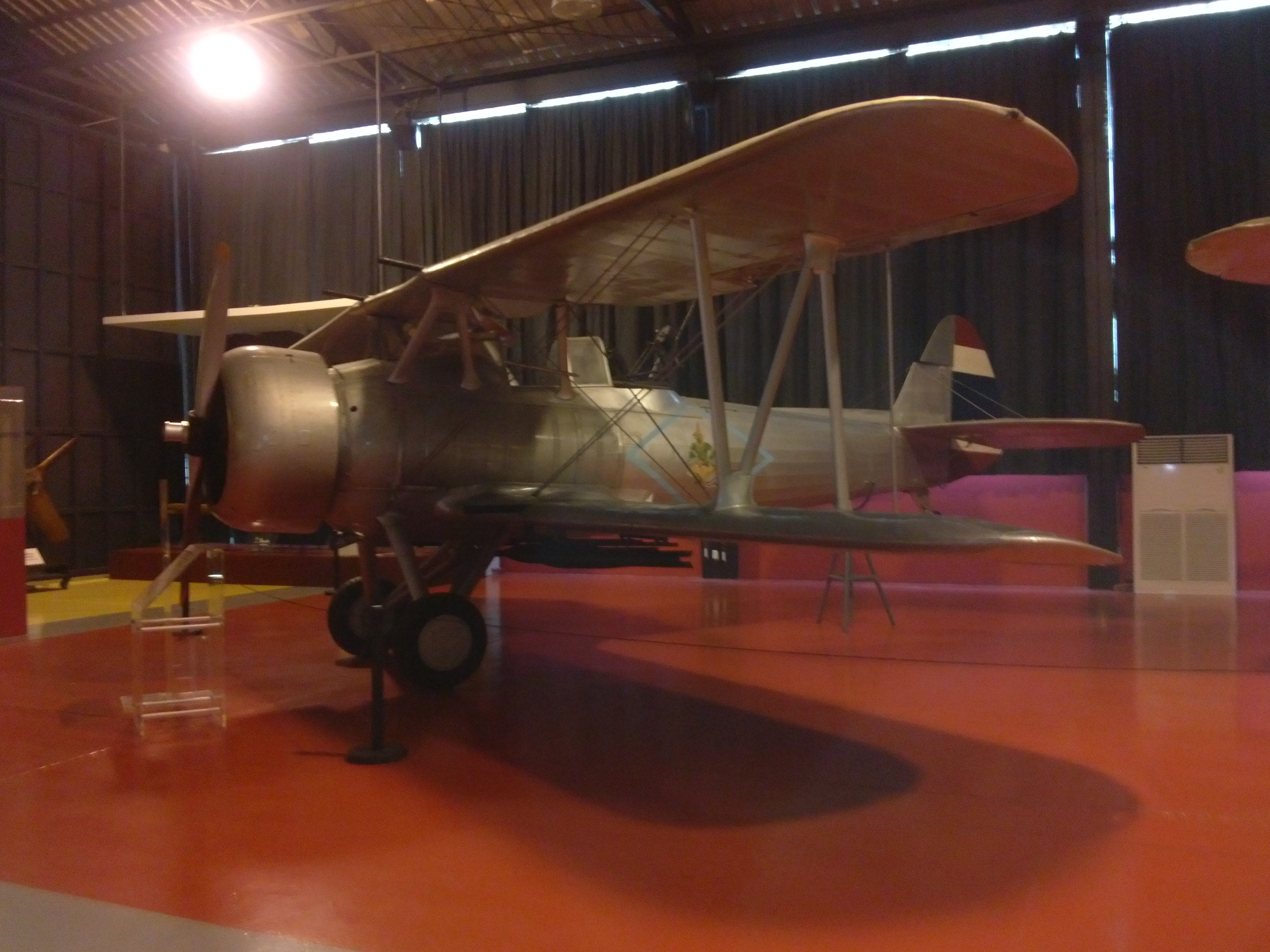
Vought O2U Corsair (under the codename V-93S/SA)

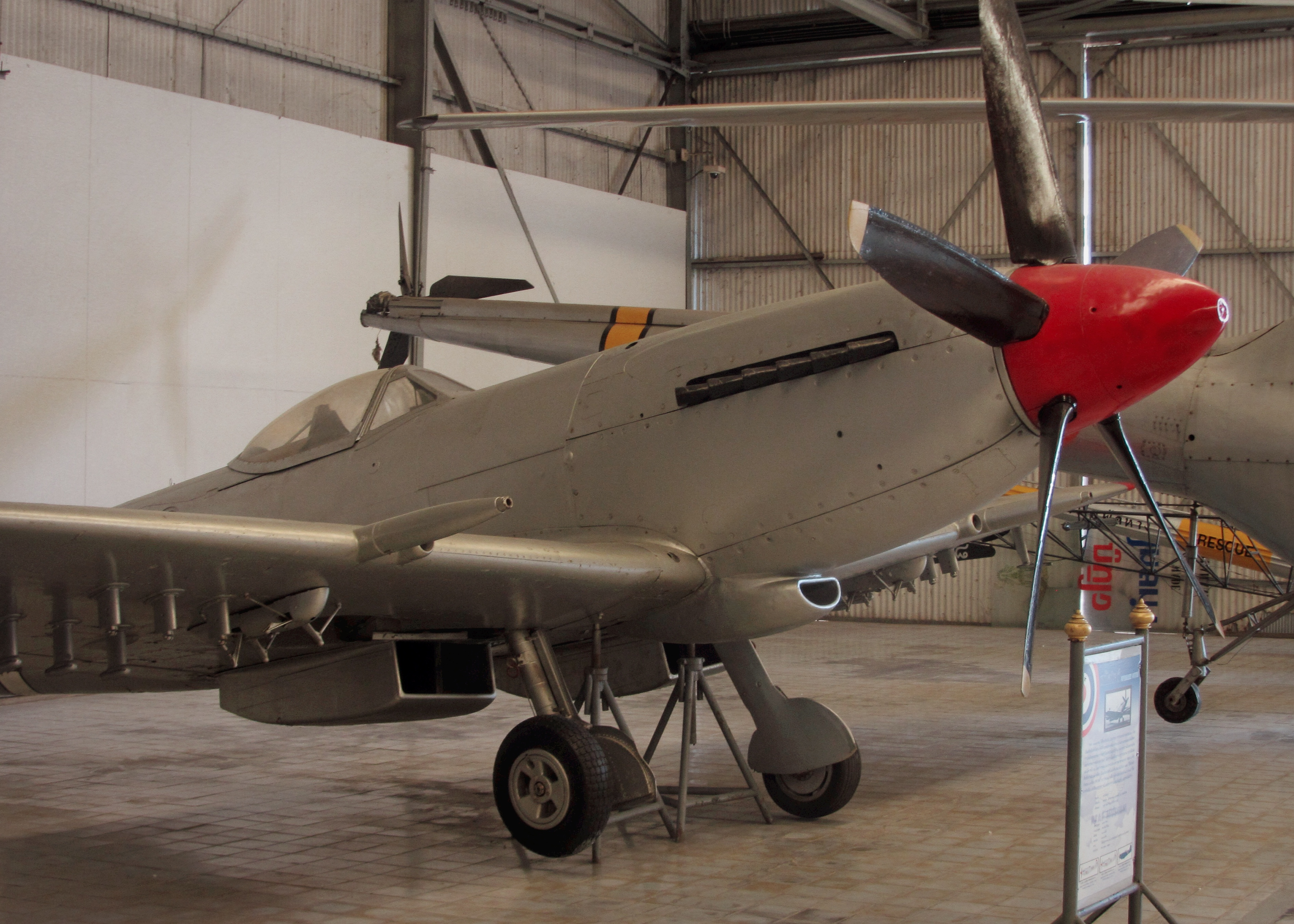
Spitfire FR Mk.XIVe SM914. Royal Thai Air Force serial KH14-1/93

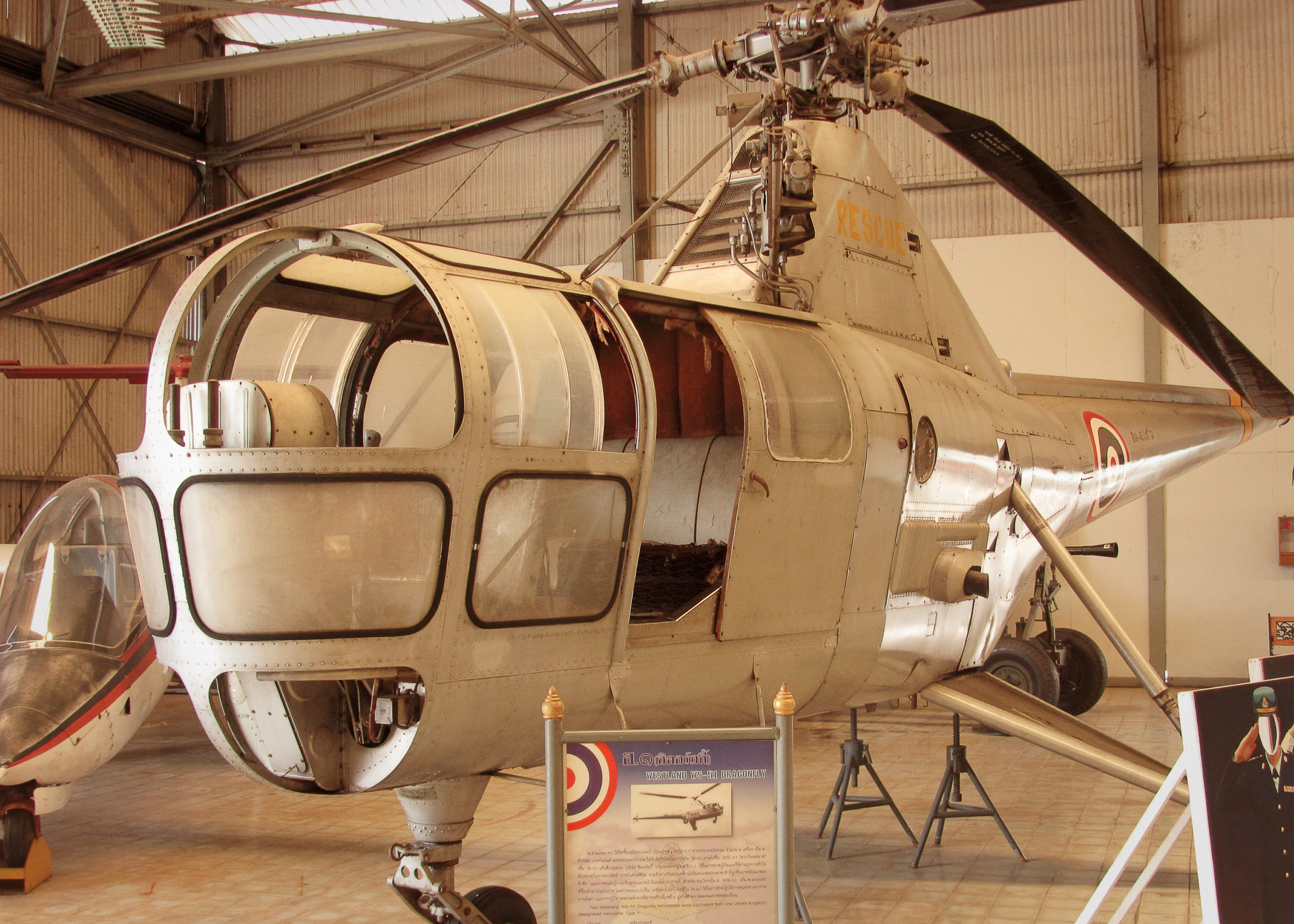
Westland Dragonfly WS-51 Mk.1A H1-4/96 (cn WA/H/120)

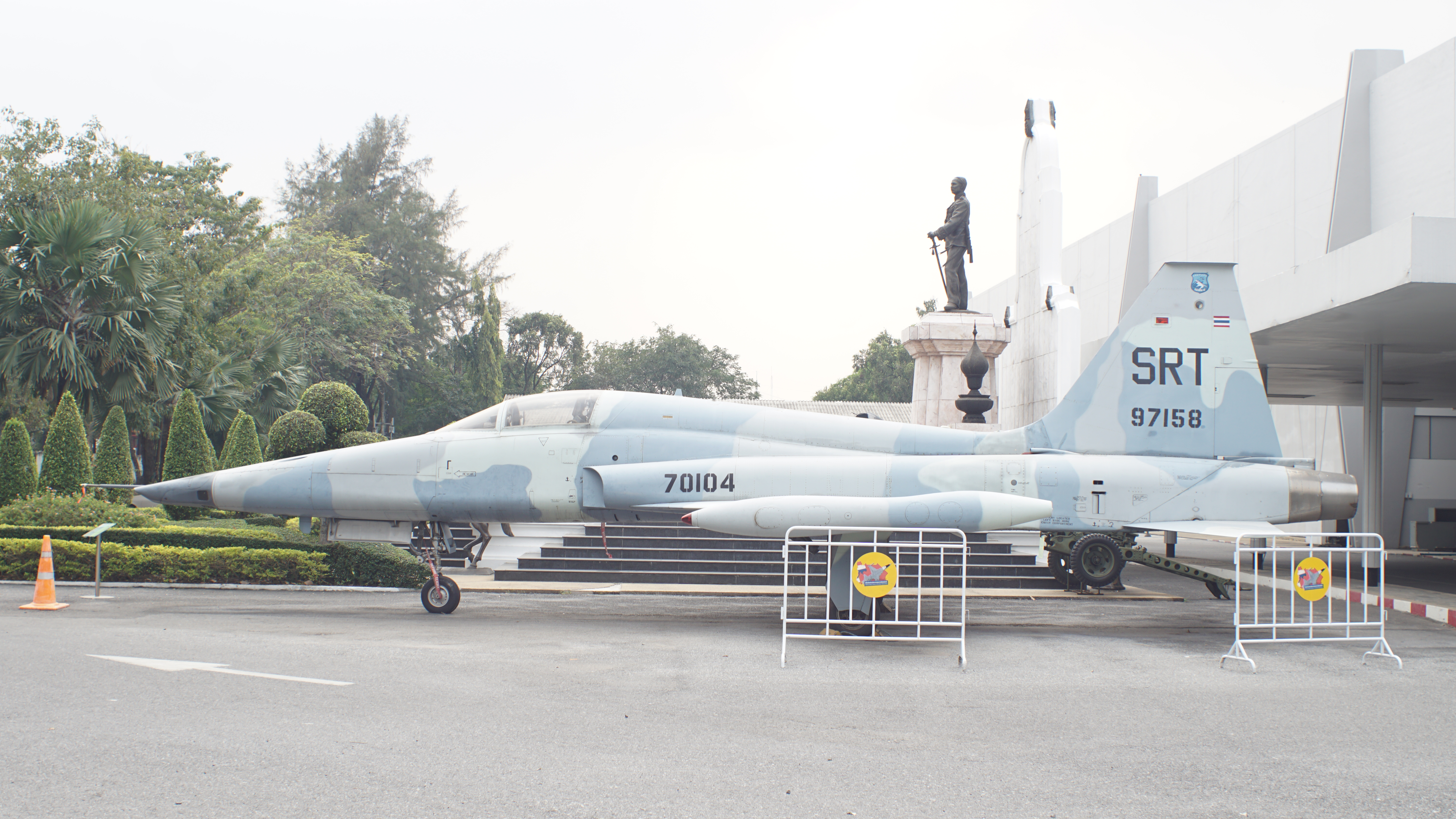
F-5A 97158

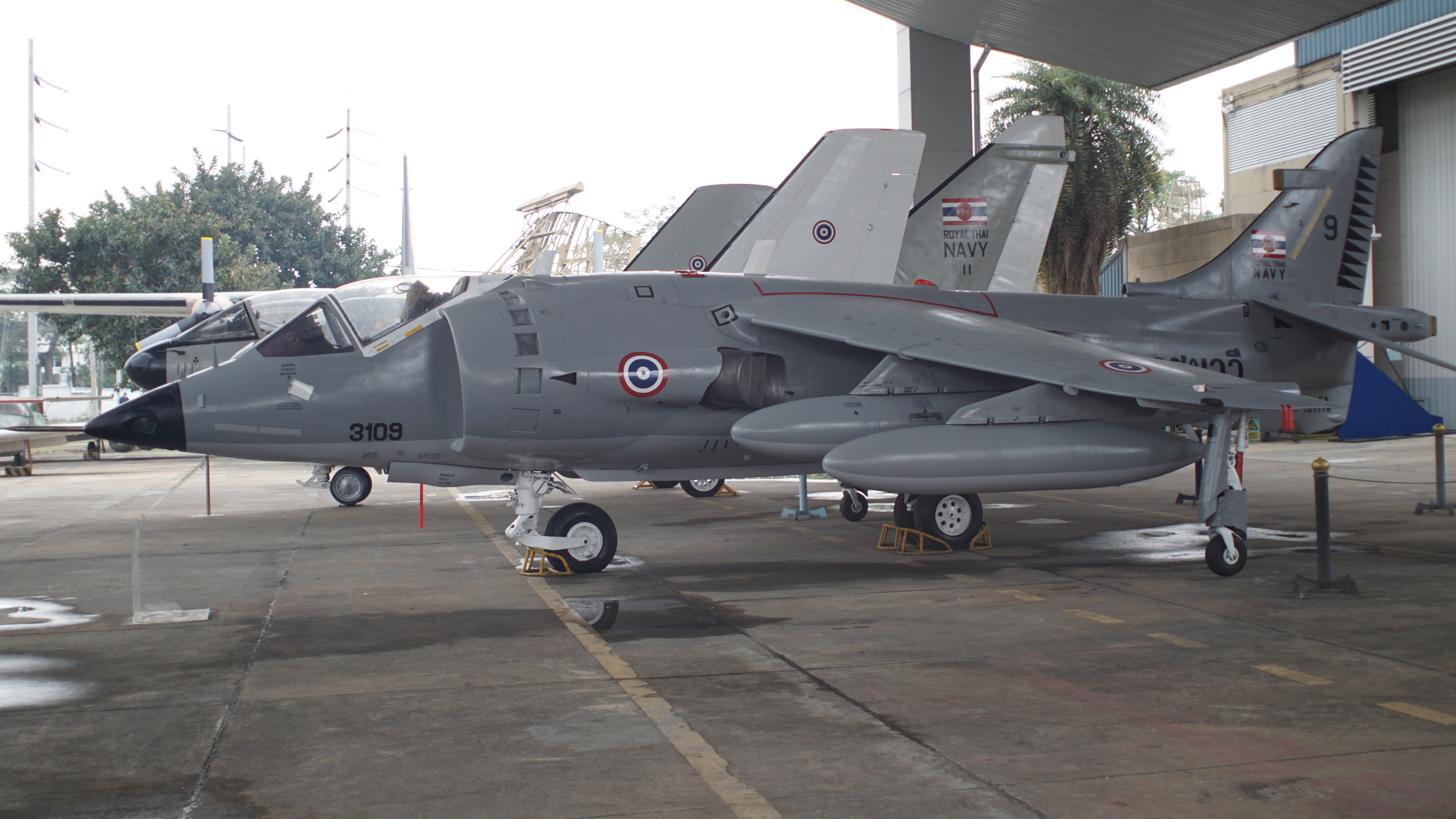
Retired AV-8S Thai Navy

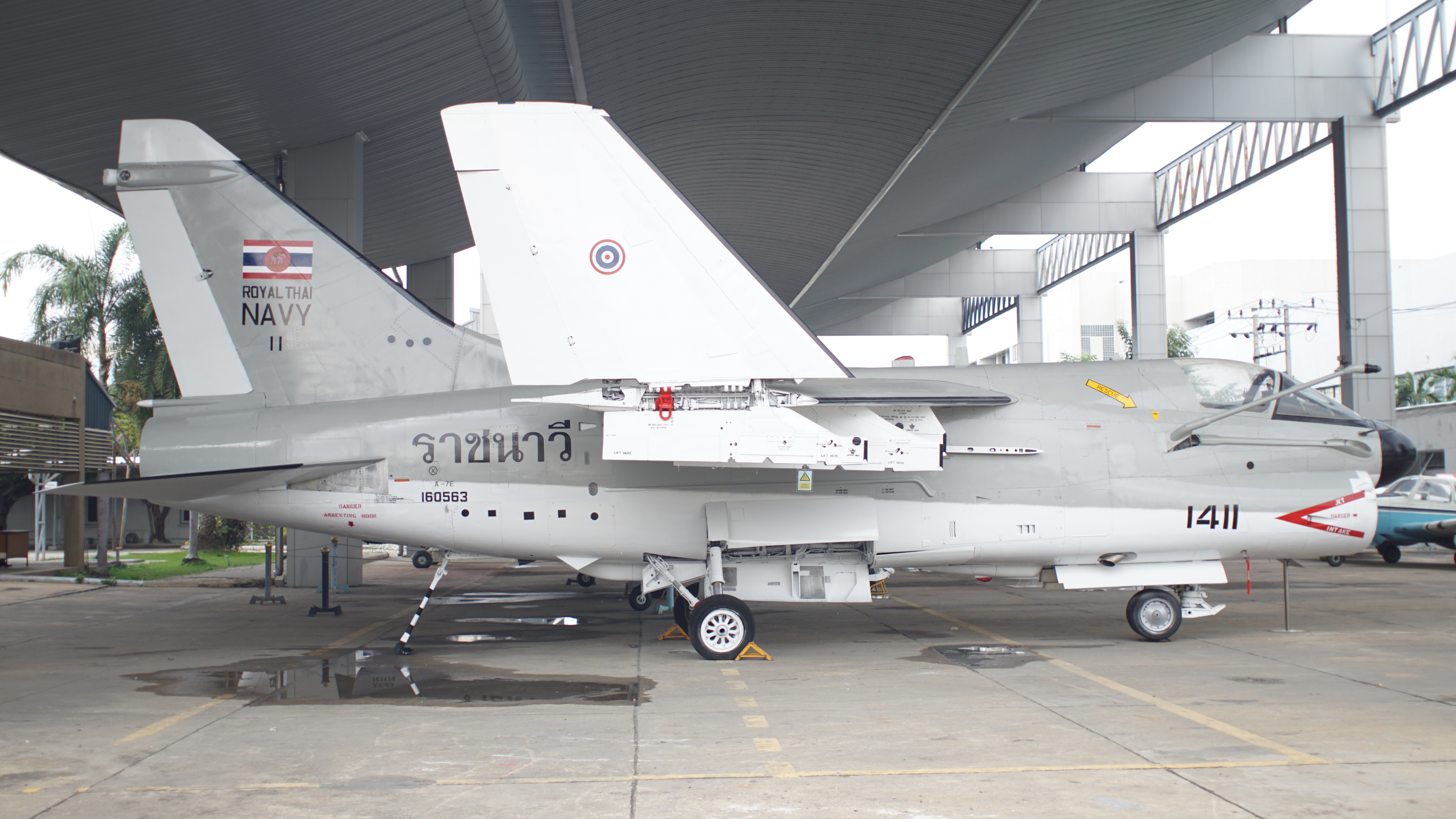
A-7E Thai Navy

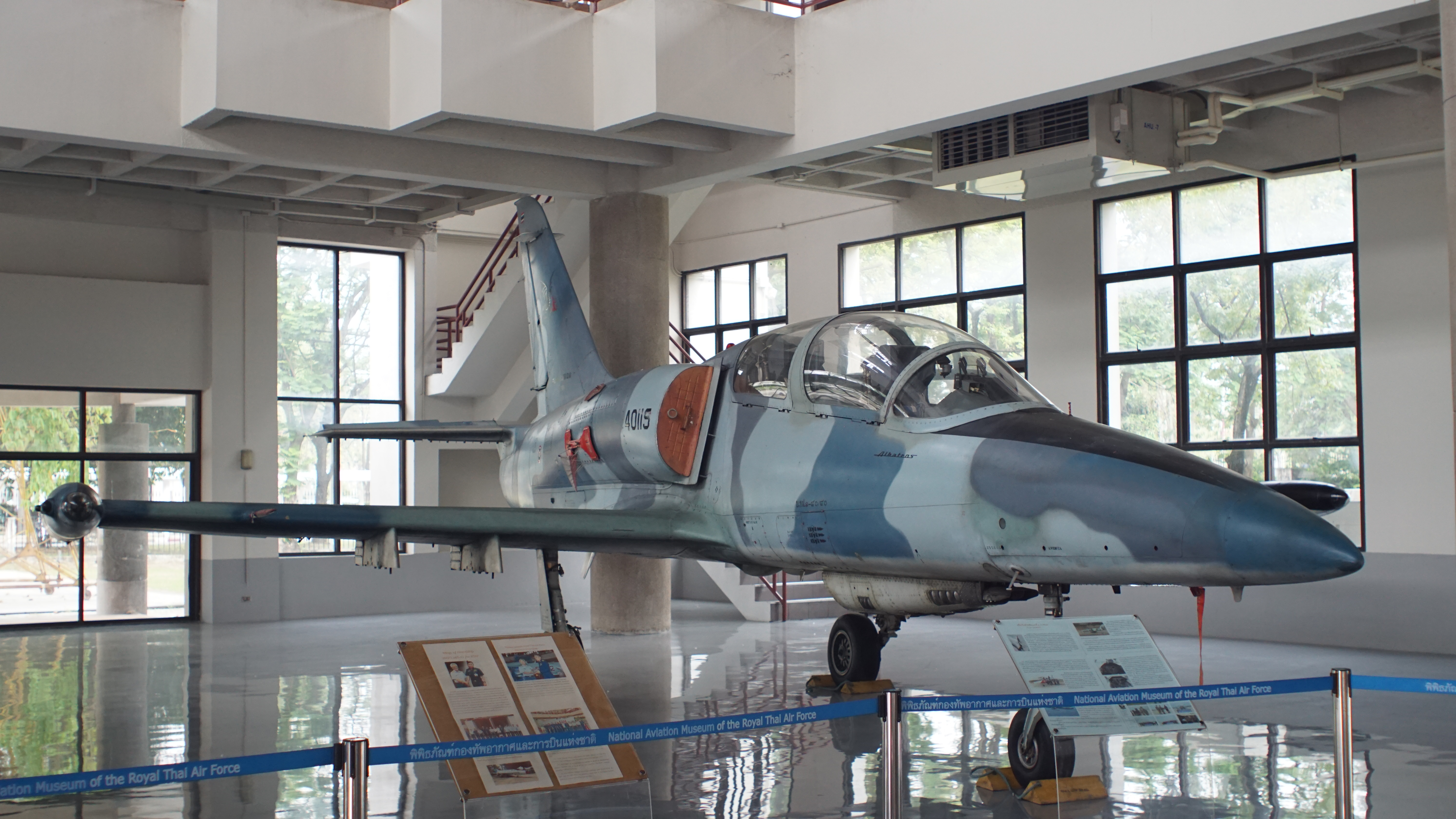
L-39 ZA/ART

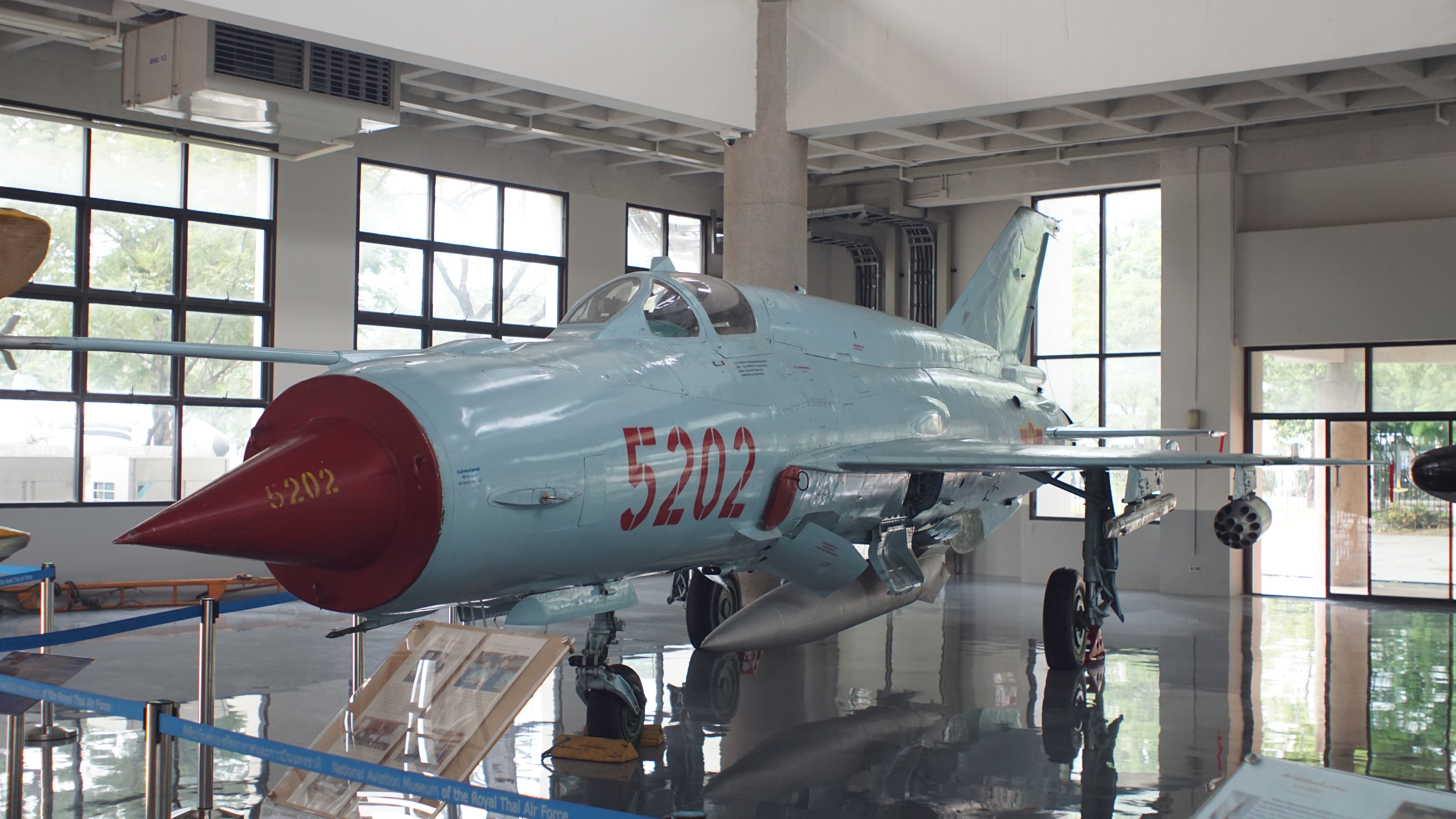
Ex Vietnamese Air Force Mig-21

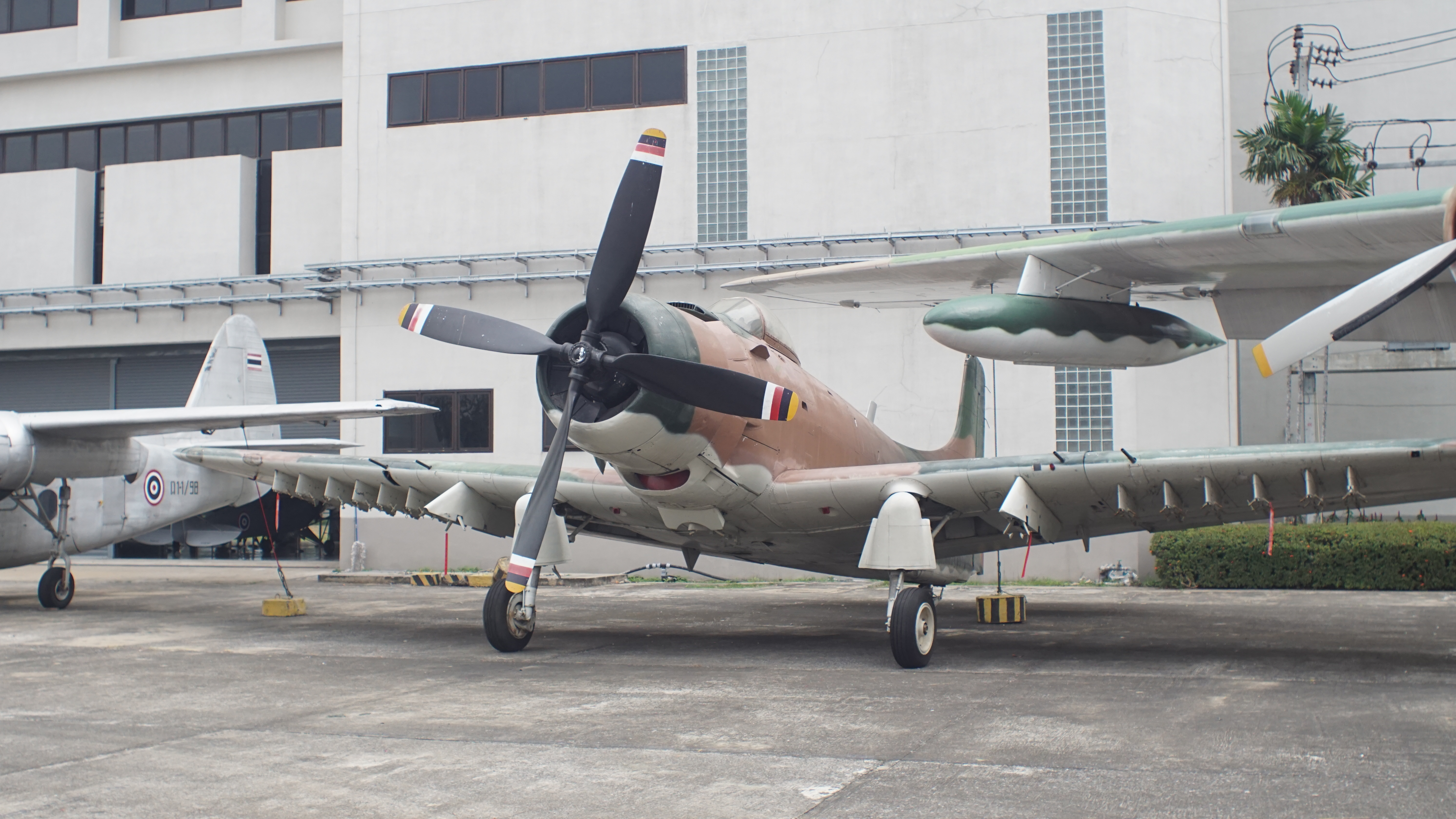
Retired Douglas A-1 Skyraider

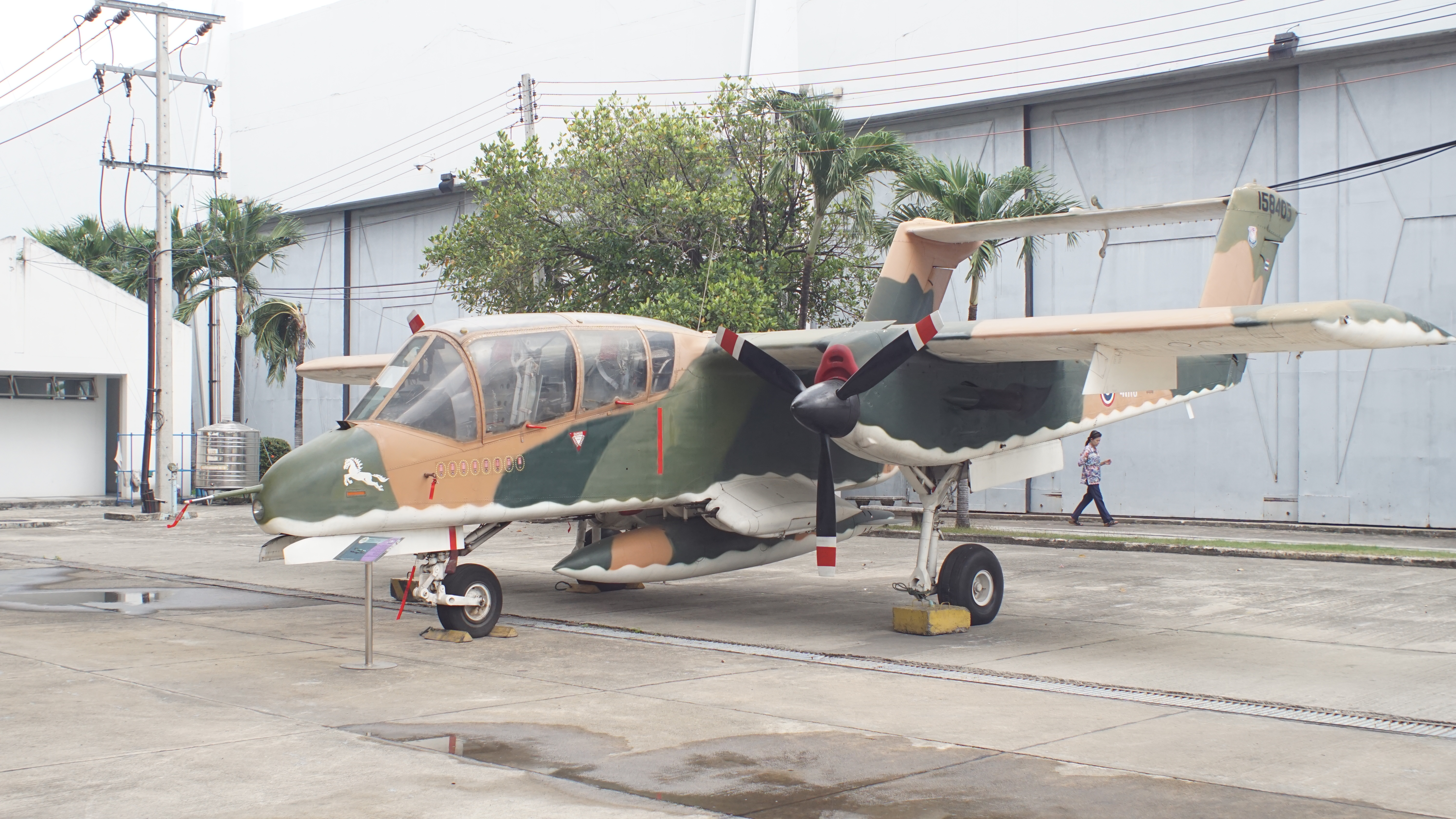
OV-10

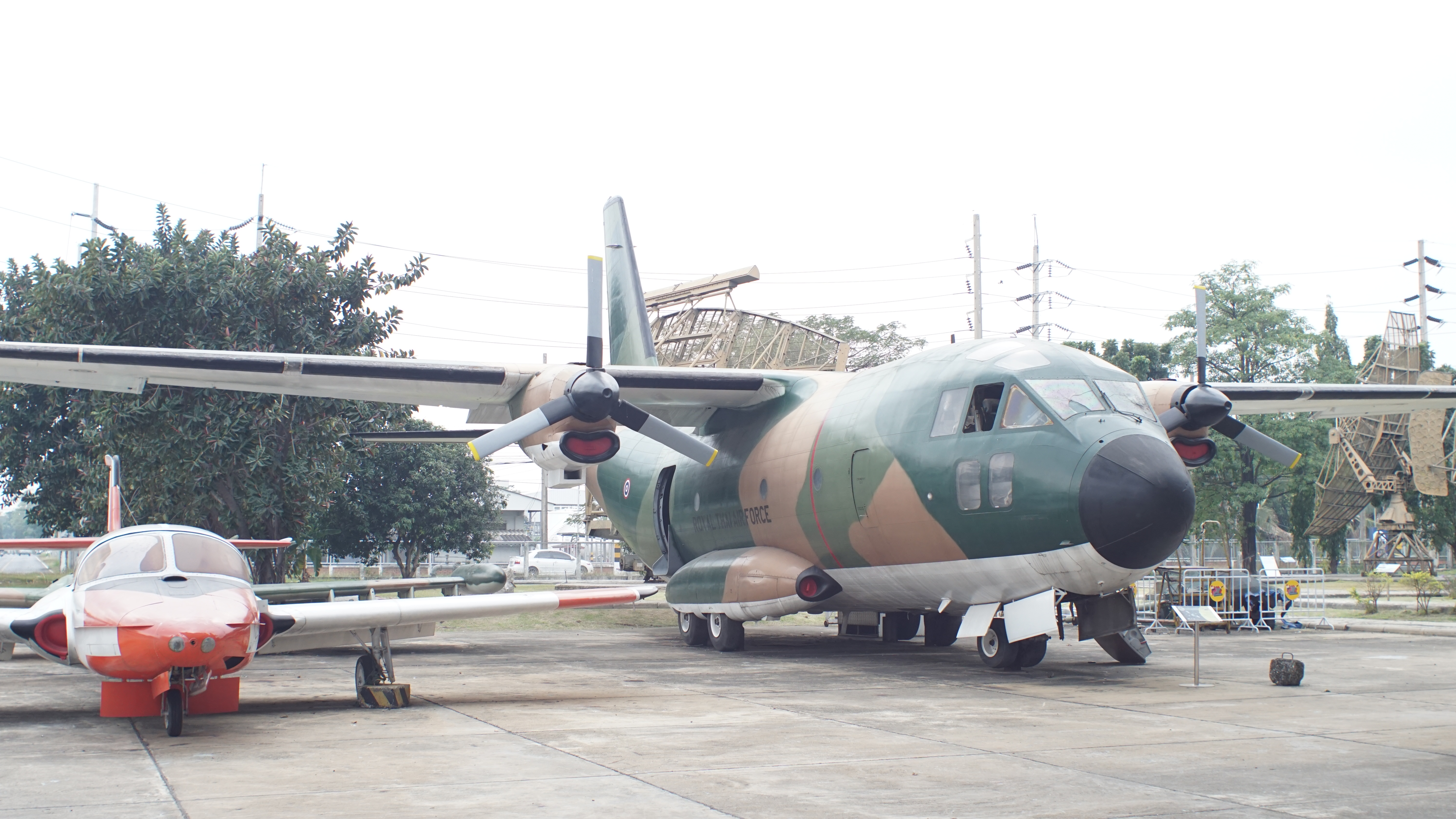
G-222

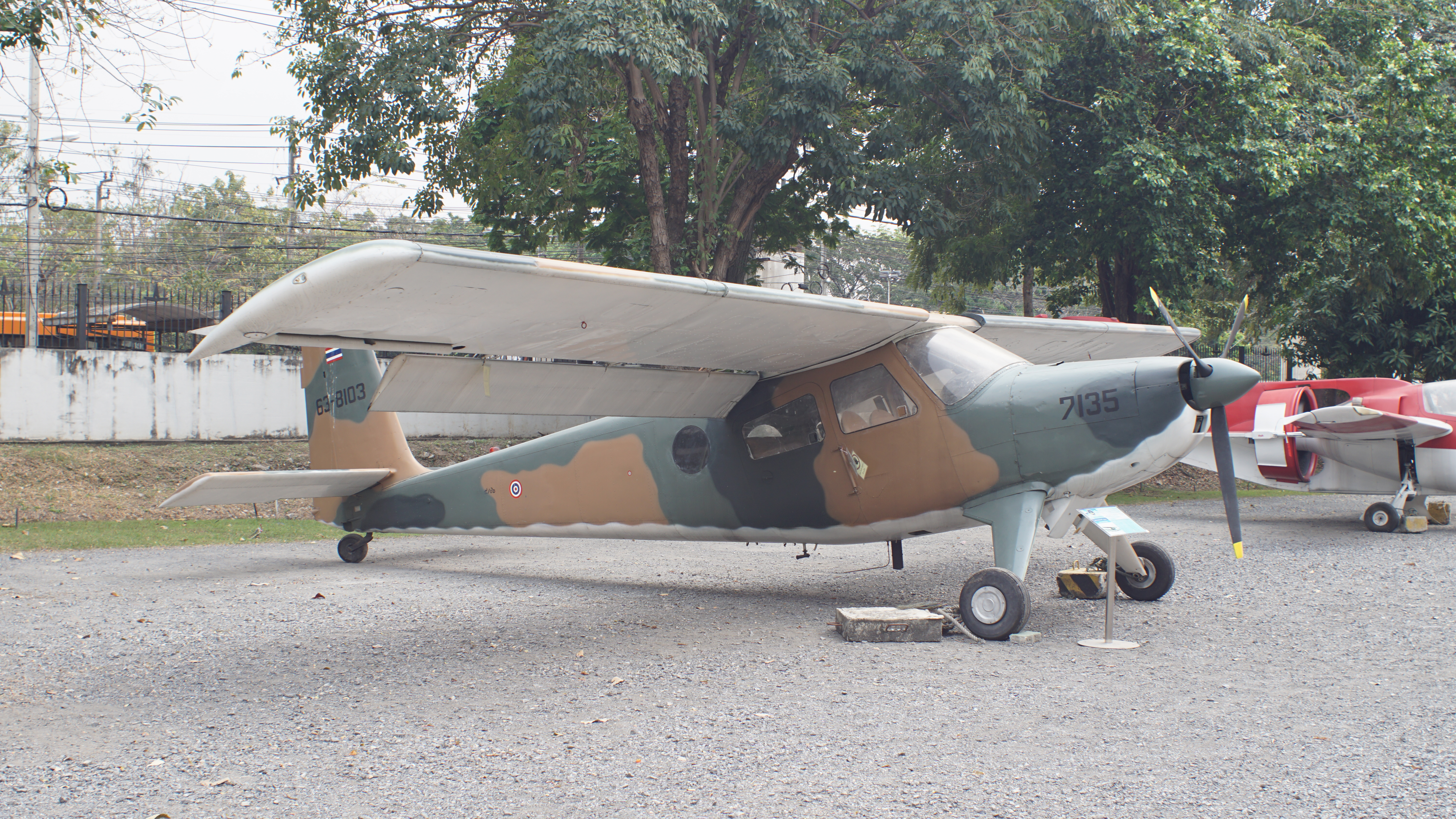
Helio U-10B

== See also ==
- List of aerospace museums
