= Prajadhipok (aircraft) =

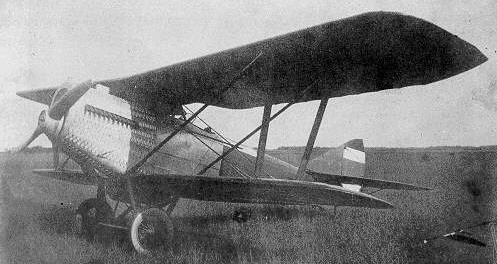

General information
- Type: Fighter
- Manufacturer: Royal Siamese Air Force Manufacturing Division
- Designer: Lt. Colonel Luang Neramit Baijayonta
- Status: Retired
- Primary user: Air Force Directorate, Royal Siamese Army, Royal Thai Air Force
- Number built: 1

History
- Introduction date: 1929
- First flight: 1929

The Prajadhipok (Thai: ประชาธิปก), officially designated B.ThO.1 (Thai: บ.ทอ.๑) and later B.Kh.5 (Thai: บ.ข.๕), was a Siamese single-seat biplane fighter. It was the second indigenous Siamese aircraft design and the first fighter aircraft. Lieutenant Colonel Luang Neramit Baijayonta designed and oversaw construction of the aircraft in 1929, which was named Prajadhipok (Democrat) for the then reigning monarch King Prajadhipok (Rama VII). It was the second aircraft designed and built in Siam and the first Siamese designed and built fighter, designated Fighter Type 5. However it remained experimental and production does not seem to have ensued, possibly due to the death of the designer shortly after the first flight. The aircraft was still in service at the start of World War II.

== Specifications (Prajadhipok Fighter type 5.) ==
General characteristics

- Crew: 1
- Powerplant: 1 × Curtiss water-cooled inline engine, 257 kW (345 hp)
