= Vought O2U Corsair =

1926 naval observation aircraft family

O2U Corsair
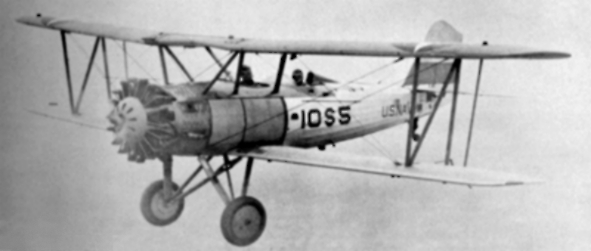
- O2U-4 Corsair

General information
- Type: Observation
- National origin: United States
- Manufacturer: Vought
- Primary users: United States Navy United States Marine Corps; United States Coast Guard
- Number built: 580

History
- Introduction date: 1926

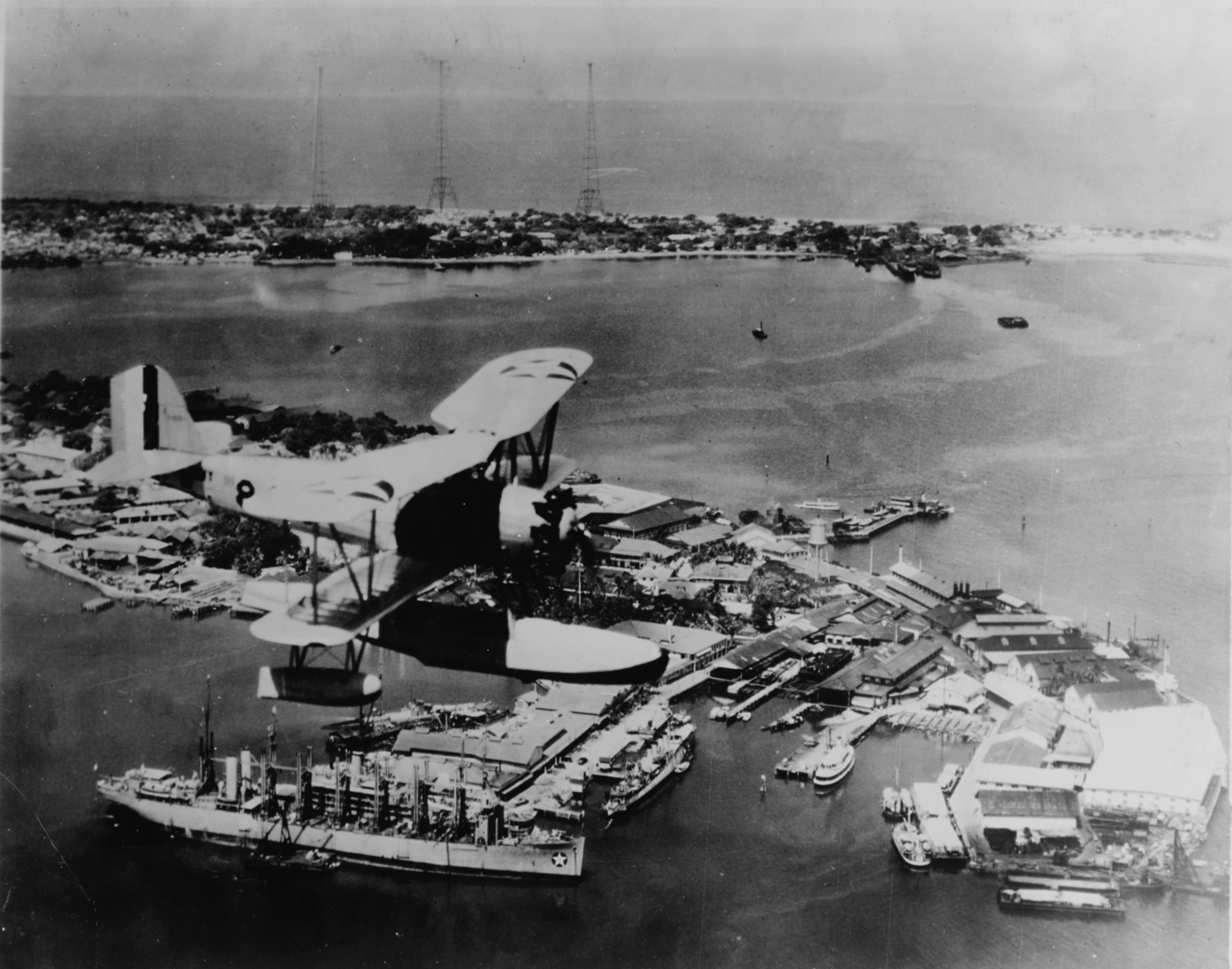
An O2U floatplane flies over the Cavite Navy Yard, circa 1930. The seaplane tender Jason is docked at the yard, directly below the plane. Sangley Point is in the background.

The Vought O2U Corsair is a 1920s biplane scout and observation aircraft. Developed by Vought Corporation, the O2U was ordered by the United States Navy (USN) in 1927. Powered by a 400 hp (300 kW) Pratt & Whitney R-1340 engine, it incorporated a steel-tube fuselage structure and a wood wing structure with fabric covering. Many were seaplanes or amphibians.

The O2U was the first of several Vought aircraft to bear the name Corsair. The Vought SBU Corsair of 1933, Vought F4U Corsair of 1938, and A-7 Corsair II of 1963 all also bore the name.

== Design and development ==
Two prototypes were ordered in 1926 and tested by the Navy Trial Board before the first production batches were ordered. In 1927, a total of 291 O2Us were produced. The O2U-2, -3 and -4 were ordered in 1928 with minor changes. By 1930 they were being superseded by the O3U which was basically similar to the O2U-4, one variant of which was fitted with the Grumman float, and were manufactured until 1936. A total of 289 were built. Many of them had cowled engines and some had enclosed cockpits.

== Operational history ==
The 600–690 hp (450–510 kW) Pratt & Whitney R-1690-42 Hornet engine was used to power Corsairs designated SU-1 to SU-4. The change in designation reflected their role as scouts (their larger engines and heavier weight precluded their use as floatplanes, and USN examples were only used on wheels from either carrier decks or land bases). A total of 289 SU aircraft were built for the United States Navy. No fewer than 141 Corsairs were still serving with the US Navy and United States Marine Corps when the United States entered World War II in December 1941.

Export versions included the Corsair V-65F, V-66F and V-80F for the Argentine Navy, the V-80P for the Peruvian Air Force, and the V-85G for Germany. China purchased Corsair variants V-65C and V-92C. Brazil purchased 36 aircraft V-65B, some hydroplanes V-66B and 15 V-65F.

In March 1929, Mexico purchased 12 armed aircraft O2U-2M versions with the 400 hp (300 kW) Wasp engine to thwart a military coup. Mexico then built 31 more units under licence, and called them Corsarios Azcárate O2U-4A. In 1937, Mexico purchased 10 V-99M equipped with the Pratt & Whitney R-1340-T1H-1 550 hp (410 kW) Wasp engine, some of them may have been sent to Spain.

China purchased the 42 export versions of O2U-1 from 1929 to 1933, and 21 export versions of O3U between 1933 and 1934 and they saw extensive bombing actions. The O2U-1 versions participated in the Central Plains War and in the January 28 Incident against Japanese targets, while the O3U versions first participated in the Battle of Pingxingguan to support the Chinese ground forces, and later against the Japanese targets in Shanghai.

In 1929 Peru replaced surviving Vought UOs with 12 O2U-1. Used first as trainers, they saw action against APRA rebels in the north of the country, and against Colombian forces during the Colombia-Peru War. None were lost due to enemy fire, but several were destroyed in accidents. These were also used for light bombing and casualty evacuation by the U.S. Marine Corps during the U.S. intervention in Nicaragua in the late 1920s.

Thailand used its Corsairs in the Franco-Thai War and in the Battle of Ko Chang against the French Navy.

== Variants ==
XO-28
Single example for U.S. Army Air Corps evaluation with serial 29-323, Wright Field Project Number P-547, powered by a 450 h.p. R-1340-C engine. Destroyed in a fire at in March 1930.
O2U-1
two prototypes followed by 130 production aircraft for USN with interchangeable wheel/float landing gear and 28 aircraft for other customers. 450 hp (340 kW) Pratt & Whitney R-1340-88 Wasp engine
O2U-2
37 built, increased span and larger rudder
O2U-3
110 built (30 for export), revised wing rigging, some had redesigned tail surfaces and Pratt & Whitney R-1340-C engine
O2U-4
43 built (1 for export. Also seven civilian O2U were built), similar to O2U-3 but with equipment changes
O2U-4A
31 built, Mexican licensed production
O3U-1
87 built as observation seaplanes incorporating Grumman amphibious float
O3U-2
29 built, strengthened airframe, Pratt & Whitney R-1690 Hornet engine
O3U-3
76 built, 550 hp (410 kW) Pratt & Whitney R-1340-12 Wasp engine.
O3U-4
65 built, Pratt & Whitney R-1690-42 Hornet engine.
XO3U-5
test aircraft with Pratt & Whitney R-1535 engine
XO3U-6
test aircraft converted from O3U-3 with NACA cowling and enclosed cockpits
O3U-6
32 built, 16 with Pratt & Whitney R-1340-12 Wasp and 16 with Pratt & Whitney R-1340-18 Wasp engines
SU-1
Scout version of the O3U based on the O3U-2, 28 built
SU-2
Scout version of the O3U based on the O3U-4, 53 built
SU-3
Variant of the SU-2 with low-pressure tires, 20 built
XSU-4
SU-2 converted as a prototype SU-4 variant with a 600 hp (450 kW) R-1690-42 engine, later became an SU-4.
SU-4
SU-4 re-engined with a 600 hp (450 kW) R-1690-2 engine, 41 built
One United States Navy O2U-3 evaluated by the United States Army Air Corps.
Vought V-65B
Export version for Brazil - 36
Vought V-65C
Export version for Nationalist China
Vought V-65F
Export version for Argentine Navy
Vought V-66B
Export version for Brazil
Vought V-66E
Export version for United Kingdom, powered by 500 hp (370 kW) Pratt & Whitney Wasp D.1 engine, one brought for evaluation by the Royal Air Force, delivered 1933 and discarded 1936.
Vought V-66F
Export version for Brazil - 15, and Argentine Navy
Vought V-80F
Export version for Argentine Navy
Vought V-80P
Export version for Peruvian Air Force
Vought V-85G
Export version for Germany
Vought V-92C
Export version for Nationalist China
Vought V-93S
Export version of the O3U-6 for Thailand. Locally designated B.F.5 (Thai: บ.ฝ.๕) as a trainer and B.J.1 (Thai: บ.จ.๑) as an attack aircraft.
Vought V-99M
Export version for Mexico
TNCA Corsario Azcárate
31 O2U-4A aircraft built under license in Mexico.
Vought AXV1
A single O2U supplied to the Imperial Japanese Navy Air Service for evaluation in 1929.
O1V
Brazilian Navy designation of the O2U-2A.
O2V
Brazilian Navy designation of the V-66B.

== Operators ==
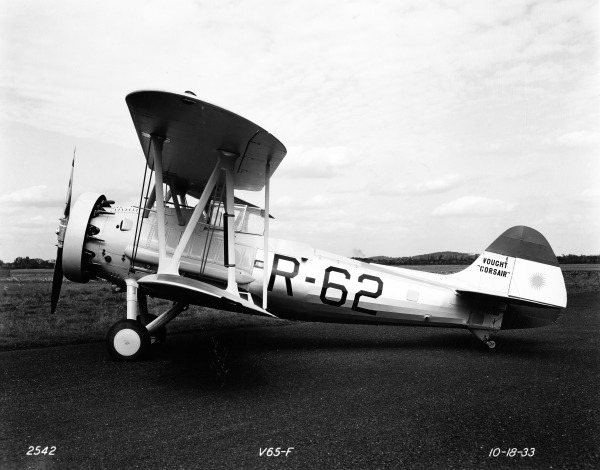
Argentine Navy O2U Corsair

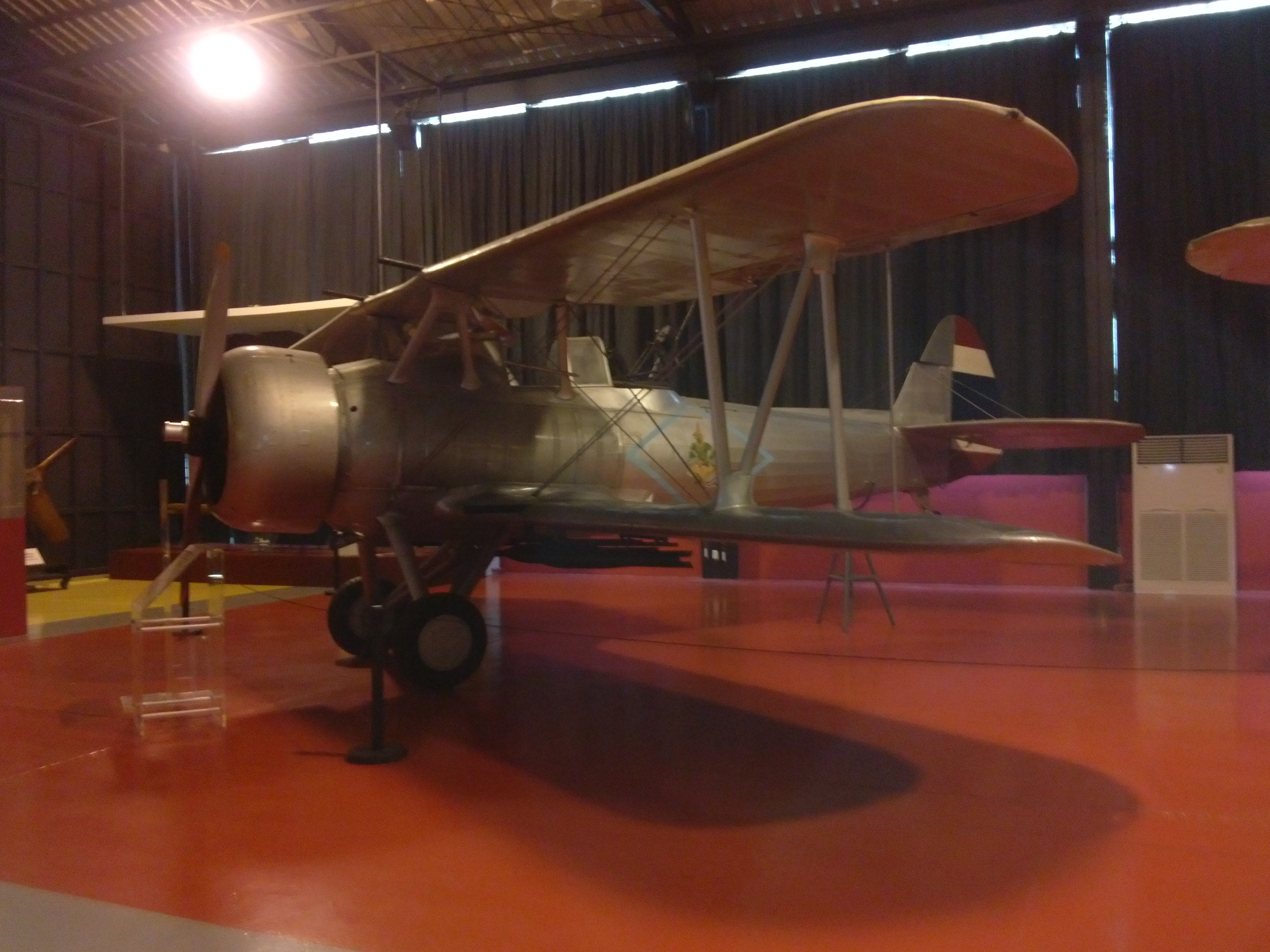
The only survivor of V-93S/SA Corsair fleet, displayed at the Royal Thai Air Force Museum

Argentina

- Argentine Navy
  - Argentine Naval Aviation

Brazil

- Brazilian Air Force

China

- Chinese Nationalist Air Force
- Chinese Red Army - One V-65-C1 was obtained from a defection during the Long March and named "Lenin".

Cuba

- Cuban Air Force - received at least 14 O2U-1A and O2U-3As from 1929.

Dominican Republic

- Dominican Air Force - received one O2U-1 and two O2U-3SDs.

Germany - commercial variant (V-85G) used to deliver mail from the ocean liners SS Bremen and SS Europa
Japan

- Imperial Japanese Army Air Force

Mexico

- Mexican Air Force

Peru

- Peruvian Air Force

United Kingdom

- Royal Air Force, one V.66E for evaluation

United States

- United States Army Air Corps one for evaluation
- United States Navy
- United States Marine Corps
- United States Coast Guard

Thailand

- Royal Thai Air Force had 70 operational aircraft at the time of the French-Thai War.

== Specifications (SU-4 Corsair) ==
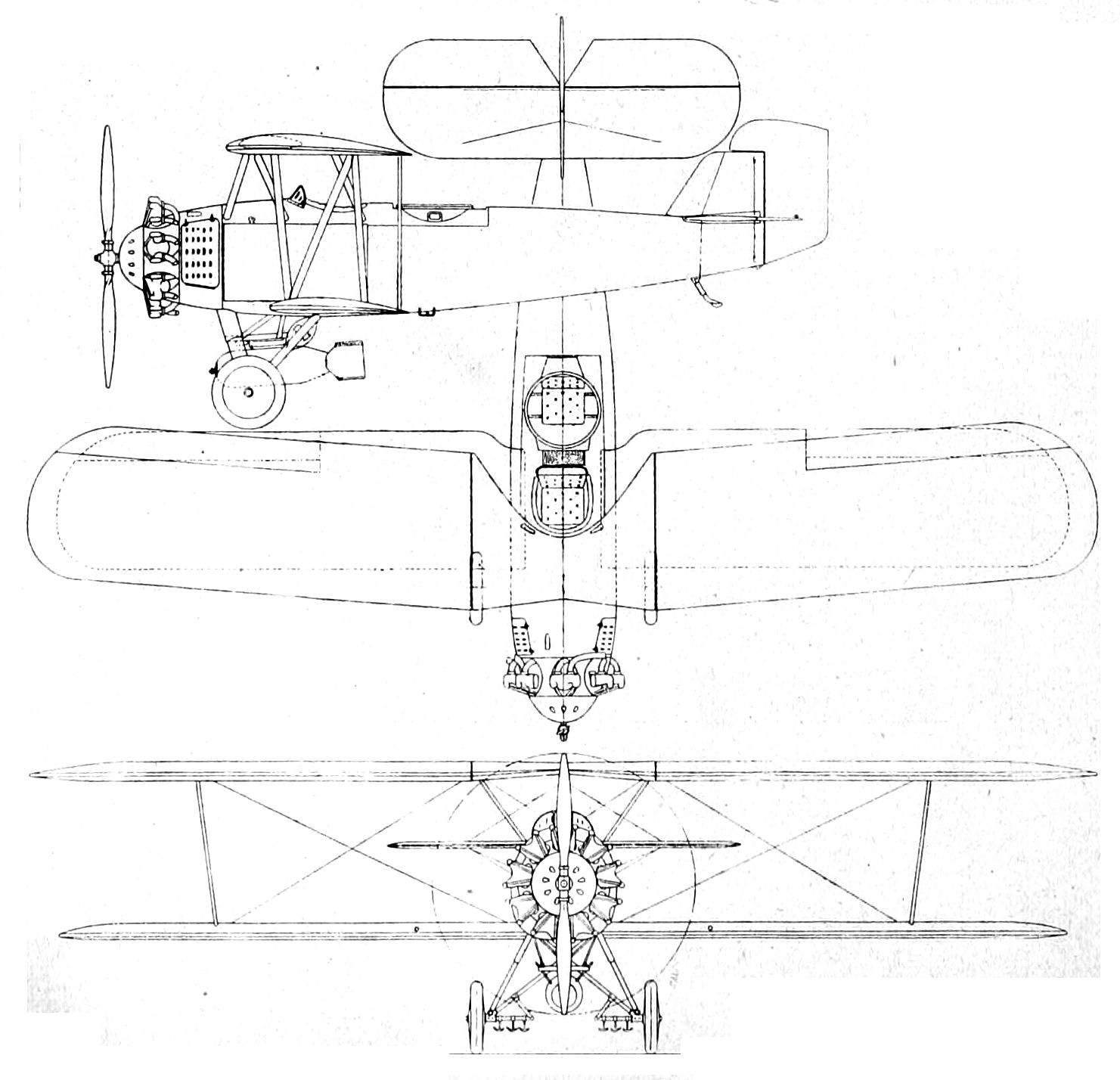
Vought O2U-2 3-view drawing from Aero Digest November 1928

Data from The Complete Encyclopedia of World Aircraft

General characteristics

- Crew: Two
- Capacity: 500 lb (230 kg)
- Length: 27 ft 5.5 in (8.369 m)
- Wingspan: 36 ft (11 m)
- Height: 11 ft (3.4 m)
- Wing area: 337 sq ft (31.3 m^{2})
- Empty weight: 3,312 lb (1,502 kg)
- Max takeoff weight: 4,765 lb (2,161 kg)
- Powerplant: 1 × Pratt & Whitney R-1690-42 Hornet radial, 600 hp (450 kW)

Performance

- Maximum speed: 167 mph (269 km/h, 145 kn) at sea level
- Range: 680 mi (1,090 km, 591 nmi)
- Service ceiling: 18,600 ft (5,700 m)
- Power/mass: 0.13lb/hp (0.21 kW/kg)

Armament

- Guns: 3 x .30 in (7.62 mm) Browning machine guns, two forward firing in upper wing and one on a trainable mount in rear cockpit
- Bombs: 4 x 116 lb (53 kg) or 10 x 30 lb (14 kg) bombs under lower wings
