= List of equipment of the Estonian Defence League =

This is a list of military equipment used by the Estonian Defence League in the past or present. It includes small arms, artillery, combat vehicles and logistics vehicles. Most of the equipment is received from the Estonian Defence Forces, through the institutions of the Estonian Ministry of Defence or as hand-me-downs from other countries.

== Weapons ==
Model	Image	Origin	Type	Caliber	Notes
Pistols
Heckler & Koch USP		Germany	Semi-automatic pistol	9×19mm Parabellum	
Glock		Austria; Norway	Semi-automatic pistol	9×19mm Parabellum	Norwegian Glock-17's to be acquired.
Submachine guns
m/45 B		Sweden	Submachine gun	9×19mm Parabellum	Used by Guard Service.
Heckler & Koch MP5		West Germany; Norway	Submachine gun	9×19mm Parabellum	Used weapons purchased from Norway in 2013.
Assault rifles
LMT R-20 Rahe		United States	Assault rifle	5.56×45mm NATO; 7.62×51mm NATO	Territorial Defence (Estonian: Maakaitse) maneuver units will be equipped with the new standard-issue rifle.
Heckler & Koch G3		Sweden; Norway; West Germany	Battle rifle	7.62×51mm NATO	Ak 4, AG-3F2, G3A3ZF and G3A4 variants.
Sniper rifles
M14 TP2		United States; Estonia	Designated marksman rifle	7.62×51mm NATO	40 500 M14 rifles were donated by USA in 1998. Some were modified to M14 TP2 sniper rifles by E-Arsenal in Estonia. Equipped with a Schmidt & Bender 3-12x50 scope. 35 000 M14 battle rifles were donated to Ukraine in the spring of 2022.
Våpensmia NM149-F1		Norway	Sniper rifle	7.62×51mm NATO	
Machine guns
MG 3		West Germany	General-purpose machine gun	7.62×51mm NATO	
FN MAG		Belgium; Sweden	General-purpose machine gun	7.62×51mm NATO	Variant Kulspruta 58B. Donated by Sweden between 1999 and 2002.
M2 Browning		United States	Heavy machine gun	12.7×99mm NATO	
Grenade launchers
Heckler & Koch HK79		Germany	Grenade launcher	40x46mm	Under barrel 1970's design for G3 rifles. (HK69 - stand alone weapon pictured - HK 79 is a variant.) Purchased from Norway in 2013.
M203		United States	Grenade launcher	40x46mm	Under barrel design for LMT R20 RAHE rifles.
Anti-armour weapons
B-300		Israel	Shoulder-fired missile	82mm	Bought from Israel in 1993. Used in Pärnumaa county brigade.
Carl Gustav		Sweden	Recoilless rifle	84mm	Variant M2.
Pansarvärnspjäs 1110		Sweden	Recoilless rifle	90mm	130 units.
M40A1		United States	Recoilless rifle	105mm	30 units.
FGM-148 Javelin		United States	Anti-tank guided missile	127mm	Unknown number in service with the Estonian Defence League.
Spike		Germany; Israel	Anti-tank guided missile		Spike SR variant to replace 90 mm recoilless guns.
Mortars
B-455		Israel	Mortar	81mm	Partially replaced by the M252.
M252		United States	Mortar	81mm	
m/41D		Finland; Sweden	Mortar	120mm	

== Vehicles ==
Model	Image	Origin	Type	Number	Notes
BTR-80		Soviet Union	Armoured personnel carrier	13	BTR-80 UNSh version. 13 vehicles received in 2013 from Estonian Defence Forces.
Mercedes-Benz Unimog		Germany	Military logistics truck	97+	Mostly Unimog 416 donated by Denmark and some 435/1300L series models.
Mercedes-Benz 1017A		Germany	Military logistics truck	95	Bought from Germany.
Volvo Tgb		Sweden	Military light utility vehicle		Some mounted with Ksp 58 or 90mm recoilless rifles.
Mercedes-Benz G-Class		Germany	Military light utility vehicle		Unknown number bought from Netherlands.

== Animals ==
Name	Image	Type	Notes
Horse		Domesticated equine	In August of 2019, a group of re-enactors who were affiliated with the Defense League formed a cavalry unit, now it is part of the Võru Defense District's southeastern independent company.

== See also ==
- List of equipment of the Estonian Defence Forces
- List of active Estonian Navy ships
- List of Estonian Navy ships
- Equipment of the Estonian Air Force
- List of historic Estonian Air Force aircraft
- Equipment of the Estonian Special Operations Force
