= List of equipment of the Estonian Defence Forces =

This is a list of modern military equipment currently in service with the Estonian Defence Forces.

== Weapons ==
=== Small arms ===
Model	Image	Origin	Type	Calibre	Notes
Handguns
Heckler & Koch USP		Germany	Semi-automatic pistol	9×19mm Parabellum	Standard issue pistol.
Glock 19		Austria	Semi-automatic pistol	9×19mm Parabellum	Used by the Special Operations Forces.
Submachine guns and PDWs
Heckler & Koch MP7		Germany	PDW	4.6×30mm HK	Used by the Special Operations Forces as a backup weapon for machine gunners and snipers.
Heckler & Koch MP5 A2		West Germany	Submachine gun	9×19mm Parabellum	Purchased in 2013.
Assault rifles & battle rifles
LMT R-20 Rahe		United States	Carbine / assault rifle	5.56×45mm NATO	Standard issue assault rifle, 19,000 ordered in 2019 to replace the IMI Galil and Ak 4 rifles. First delivery in 2020, and replaced all Galil and Ak.4 by 2022. Two variants (of 5.56mm caliber; see also 7.62mm caliber variant below) are in service: R-20 S, with a barrel length of 310 mm (12 in); R-20, with a barrel length of 367 mm (14.4 in)
IMI Galil		Israel	Assault rifle	5.56×45mm NATO	Purchased in 1993. Replaced by the R-20, but still (July 2026) listed in the Estonian Defence Force website. Three variants are in service: AR with a 460 mm barrel; ARM with a 460 mm barrel; SAR with a 332 mm barrel
Heckler & Koch G3		West Germany; Norway	Battle rifle	7.62×51mm NATO	Replaced by R-20, but still listed in the EDF website as of July 2026. Four variants are in service: Ak4; G3A3ZF; G3A4; AG3F2
Heckler & Koch G36		Germany	Assault rifle	5.56×45mm NATO	Used by the Special Operations Forces and Military Police.
Heckler & Koch HK416A7		Germany	Assault rifle	5.56×45mm NATO	14.5" A7 variant, used by the Special Operations Forces.
Heckler & Koch HK417		Germany	Battle rifle	7.62×51mm NATO	Used by the Special Operations Forces in the 16.5" barreled configuration with 13" 4-vent handguard
AK 4		West Germany; Sweden	Battle rifle	7.62×51mm NATO	Used by Defence League. Being replaced by the R-20.
M14		United States	Battle rifle	7.62×51mm NATO	Used as a ceremonial weapon by the Guard Battalion. 40,500 M14 rifles were donated by USA in 1998. 35,000 M14 battle rifles were donated to Ukraine in the spring of 2022.
Precision rifles
LMT Rahe R-20 L		United States	Designated marksman rifle	7.62×51mm NATO	406 mm (16.0 in)
IMI Galil Sniper		Israel	Designated marksman rifle	7.62×51mm NATO	Purchased in 1993. Sniper rifle with a 508 mm barrel.
M14 TP2		United States	Designated marksman rifle	7.62×51mm NATO	Optical sight: TP-2 Schmidt&Bender
Våpensmia NM149		Norway	Bolt-action sniper rifle	7.62×51mm NATO	
Sako TRG		Finland	Bolt action sniper rifle	8.6x70 mm	TRG 42 purchased in 2007. 8.6 mm (.338 Lapua Magnum) sniper rifle with a 690 mm barrel. Sako TRG M10 purchased in 2023. TRG 42 started to be replaced 2024. Approximately 70 TRG M10 delivered in 2024. Two variants in service: TRG 42; TRG M10
PGM Hécate II		France	Anti-material rifle	12.7×99mm NATO	Purchased in 2007. Can be used as an anti-materiel rifle.
Machine guns
IWI Negev		Israel	Light machine gun	5.56×45mm NATO; 7.62×51mm NATO	Purchased in 1993. Negev NG7 variant ordered in 2023. Two variants are in service: 5.56mm Negev; 7.62mm Negev NG7
Heckler & Koch MG4		Germany	Light machine gun	5.56×45mm NATO	Used by the Special Operations Forces.
Ksp 58		Belgium; Sweden	General-purpose machine gun	7.62×51mm NATO	Swedish-made variant of the FN MAG. 1,500 received from Sweden between 1999 and 2002. Negev NG7 chosen as replacement in 2023.
MG 3		West Germany	General-purpose machine gun	7.62×51mm NATO	1,500 received from Germany, unknown number purchased from Norway. Negev NG7 chosen as replacement in 2023.
M2 Browning		United States	Heavy machine gun	12.7×99mm NATO	Mostly vehicle mounted.
Shotguns
Benelli M3T		Italy	Pump action shotgun	12 gauge	
Grenade launchers
Brügger & Thomet GL06		Switzerland	Grenade launcher	40×46mm LV	Stand-alone grenade launcher.
Heckler & Koch GLM		Germany	Under barrel grenade launcher	40×46mm LV	Under-barrel grenade launcher that attaches to various types of assault rifles.
Heckler & Koch 79N		Germany	Under barrel grenade launcher	40×46mm LV	Purchased in 2013. Under-barrel grenade launcher that attaches to Heckler & Koch G3 series of rifles.
M203		United States	Under barrel grenade launcher	40×46mm LV	Under-barrel grenade launcher that attaches to R-20 Rahe rifles.

=== Anti-tank weapons ===
Model	Image	Origin	Type	Calibre	Notes
Rocket launchers
Instalaza C90		Spain	Rocket launcher	90mm	At least 10,408 units are known to be purchased between 2009 and 2022. Two variants are in service: C90-CR-AM; C90-CR-RB
Recoilless rifles
Carl Gustav		Sweden	Anti-tank recoilless rifle	84mm	300 M4 received 2021. Two variants are in service: M2; M4
Anti-tank missiles
Javelin		United States	Anti-tank guided missile	127mm	80 CLUs (with option for additional 40) and 350 missiles purchased from the United States. Block-0 and Block-1 missiles supplied with United States European Reassurance Initiative funds. Estonia donated 100 Javelins to Ukraine in March 2022. More Javelins donated later. 800 missiles and 84 Lightweight Command Launch Units (LwCLUs) on order.
Spike		Israel	Anti-tank guided missile	130mm	18 Spike-LR II systems delivered in 2020. In addition, more than 500 Spike-SR systems purchased in 2022. Two variants are in service: Spike LR-II; Spike-SR

=== Air-defence equipment ===
Model	Image	Origin	Type	Calibre	Quantity	Notes
ZU-23-2 "Sergei"		Soviet Union	Autocannon	23×152mm	98	Purchased from Israel in 1993. Most units mounted on trucks.
PPZR Piorun		Poland	Man-portable air-defense system	72mm	100 launchers, 300 missiles	100 launchers with 300 missiles ordered in September 2022. Deliveries started in 2024.
Mistral		France	Short range air defense system	90mm	209	Mistral M2 (second generation) acquired in 2007. The latest generation Mistral F3 acquired in 2015, 2018 and 2023. Some donated to Ukraine. Most units mounted on trucks.
IRIS-T SLM		Germany	Medium range air defense system	127mm	1 battery (+2 on order)	In May 2023, Estonia and Latvia made a decision to jointly procure medium-range IRIS-T SLM. Estonia ordered 3 batteries. The first system arrived in June 2026.

=== Anti-ship weapons ===
Model	Image	Origin	Type	Calibre	Notes
Blue Spear 5G SSM		Israel	Anti-ship missile		Ordered in October 2021. First systems delivered in February 2024. Derivative of the Gabriel V missile, with a range up to 290 km. Missiles are mounted on trucks.
Blocker PM16		Finland	Naval mine		Delivered in December 2021, used in all minelaying capable ships. 560 kg of Foxit plastic-bonded explosive.

=== Grenades ===
Model	Image	Origin	Type	Detonation	Notes
DM61		Germany	Fragmentation grenade	Fuse	
SplHGr 85		Germany	Fragmentation grenade	Fuse	SplHGr 85 A2

=== Mortars ===
Model	Image	Origin	Type	Calibre	Notes
M252		United States	Mortar	81mm	80 units received from the United States as military aid.
m/41D		Finland	Mortar	120mm	165 units in holding as of 2010. To be replaced with mortars from Elbit Systems. At least 30 units sent to Ukraine in 2022.

== Vehicles ==
=== Armoured vehicles ===
Model	Image	Origin	Type	Quantity	Notes
CV9035EE, (CV90N)		Sweden	Infantry fighting vehicle	44	44 CV9035NL purchased from Netherlands and 37 CV90 hulls bought from Norway. Most of these hulls have been delivered to Scoutspataljon. CV9035s are equipped with additional RoofPRO and SidePRO addon armour. As of 2026, CV90s are to remain in service for up to 10 years after a replacement program was cancelled in 2026.
CV9035EE, (CV90N)		Sweden	Support vehicle	(37)	44 CV9035NL purchased from Netherlands and 37 CV90 hulls bought from Norway. Most of these hulls have been delivered to Scoutspataljon. CV9035s are equipped with additional RoofPRO and SidePRO addon armour. As of 2026, CV90s are to remain in service for up to 10 years after a replacement program was cancelled in 2026.
Patria Pasi		Finland	Armoured personnel carrier	136	XA-180: 60 units purchased from Finland (56 in service). XA-188: 81 units purchased from Netherlands (80 in service). XA-180 models to be replaced by 2030. XA-188 models to be modernized to extend their service lives to 2048.
Otokar ARMA 6×6		Turkey	Armoured personnel carrier	130	Contract awarded in October 2023 for €130 million, including training, and equipment maintenance. It was ordered jointly with the Makina NMS 4×4. The delivery started in January 2025. About 50 ARMA 6x6 + NMS 4x4 received by Spring 2025.
Nurol Makina NMS 4×4		Turkey	Infantry mobility vehicle	100	Contract awarded in October 2023, including training, and equipment maintenance. Ordered jointly with the ARMA 6×6. The delivery started in January 2025. About 50 ARMA 6x6 + NMS 4x4 received by Spring 2025.

=== Artillery ===
Model	Image	Origin	Type	Calibre	Quantity	Notes
K9EST "Kõu"		South Korea	Self-propelled howitzer	155mm	36	36 ordered from South Korea in total and the first howitzers were delivered in 2018. The domestic company Go Craft AS was contracted to integrate the radio and artillery system.
CAESAR Mk.1		France	Self-propelled howitzer	155mm	12 (+12 on order)	12 CAESAR 6x6 Mk I howitzers ordered in June 2024 with the first 6 delivered in January 2025. The remaining 6 howitzers arrived in August 2025. In February 2026, Estonia ordered another 12 howitzers.
M142 HIMARS		United States	Rocket artillery	227mm 610mm	6 (+3 on order)	6 systems ordered in December 2022 with the deliveries at the time planned to start in 2024. The package includes GMLRS (M28A2, M30A2, M31A2) and ER GMLRS (XM403, XM404) rockets as well as MGM-140 ATACMS (M57 variant) missiles. The troops were trained on the systems in the United States prior to their delivery in Estonia in mid-2025. Estonia received the 6 systems in April 2025. First firings in July 2025.
K239 Chunmoo		South Korea	Rocket artillery	Various	(9 on order)	In December 2025, Estonia signed a €290 million contract to acquire six K239 Chunmoo systems and ammunition (CGR-080, CTM-MR as well as CTM-290 tactical ballistic missiles). In May 2026, three additional launchers were ordered. First deliveries were expected at the second half of 2027.

=== Utility vehicles ===
Model	Image	Origin	Type	Quantity	Notes
Mercedes-Benz G-Class			Utility vehicle	—	Three variants are in service: G250; G290; Greenline G280 CDI
Quad ATV			All-Terrain Vehicle		
GasGas EC 350F			Motorcycle	—	

=== Logistics vehicles ===
Model	Image	Origin	Type	Quantity	Notes
Base trucks
DAF 4440/4442		Netherlands	Truck	~500	Purchased in 2008.
MAN KAT1		West Germany	Truck		MAN 4610/4620/4640/4530.
MAN TGA		Germany; Austria; Poland	Truck		
Mercedes-Benz 1017		West Germany	Truck	~100	Purchased in 2008.
Mercedes-Benz Arocs 3945 8×8		Germany	Truck	10	Purchased in 2019.
Mercedes-Benz Atego 1018A 4×4		Germany	Truck		
Mercedes-Benz Axor 1829A 4×4		Germany	Truck		
Mercedes-Benz Unimog 435		West Germany	Truck		Purchased in 2008. Two variants are in service: U 1300 L; U 1700 L
Scania G360 (8×4)		Sweden	Hooklift truck		First delivered in 2024.
Scania G410 (8×8)		Sweden	Hooklift off-road capable truck		First delivered in 2024.
Sisu E13TP		Finland	Truck	2	The truck is used to transport the Ground Master 403 radar system.
Volvo FMX 6×6		Sweden	Tactical truck with hydraulic hooklift hoist	52	Vehicle + trailer, transports 15 ft containers.: 12 purchased in 2015; 40 more purchased in 2019 (€6.9 million).
Volvo 44R		Sweden	Tactical truck		Framework agreement for 3,000 trucks in 7 years for Estonian and Latvian military for €440 million signed in October 2023. Quantity for Estonia not specified. First deliveries showed in 2025.
Volvo 66R		Sweden	Tactical truck		Framework agreement for 3,000 trucks in 7 years for Estonian and Latvian military for €440 million signed in October 2023. Quantity for Estonia not specified. First deliveries showed in 2025.
Semi-trucks
Volvo FH16 550 8×4		Sweden	Heavy equipment transporter	7	Can tow a semi-trailer weighing up to 92 tons (6-axles).
Scania G410 6×4		Sweden	Semi-truck	265	Deal signed with Latvia in February 2022, delivery since October 2024. Will partially replace DAF 2300 series vehicles.

=== Engineering vehicles ===
Model	Image	Origin	Type	Quantity	Notes
Biber		West Germany	Armoured vehicle-launched bridge	2	Purchased from Netherlands.
Dachs		West Germany	Armoured engineering vehicle	5	Purchased from Netherlands.
Bergepanzer 2		West Germany	Armoured recovery vehicle	4	Purchased from Netherlands.
TMM-3M		Ukraine; Finland	Truck launched bridge	>5	The TMM-3M bridge is mounted on the KrAZ-63221 truck. Purchased from Ukraine in 2015. Additional systems received from Finland in 2017.
Mercedes-Benz Actros		Germany	Recovery vehicle	2	

=== Unmanned ground vehicles ===
Model	Image	Origin	Type	Quantity	Notes
THeMIS		Estonia	Unmanned ground vehicle	3	

== Ships ==
=== Mine countermeasures vessels ===
Class	Image	Ship	Origin	Type	Notes
Sandown-class		EML Admiral Cowan EML Sakala EML Ugandi	United Kingdom	Minehunter	Three ships purchased from the United Kingdom in 2006. Modernized between 2018 and 2020 to extend the service lives of the ships to 2035.

=== Auxiliary vessels ===
Class	Image	Ship	Origin	Type	Notes
Lindormen-class		EML Wambola	Denmark	Auxiliary ship	The ship can also be used as a minelayer.
Kindral Kurvits class		EML Kindral Kurvits	Finland	Pollution control ship	Formerly a multifunctional pollution control vessel of the Police and Border Guard. Joined the navy in 2023.
PATROL 45 WP class		EML Raju	Estonia	Patrol boat	Formerly a multifunctional patrol boat of the Police and Border Guard. Joined the navy in 2023.
PATROL 24 class		EML Valve	Estonia	Patrol boat	Formerly a patrol boat of the Police and Border Guard. Joined the navy in 2023.

== Aircraft ==
Model	Image	Origin	Type	Variant	Quantity	Notes
Transport
M28 Skytruck		Poland	STOL light transport aircraft	C145A	2	Replaced two Antonov An-2s.
Trainer aircraft
Aero L-39		Czechoslovakia	Jet trainer	L-39C	2	Leased from AeroHooldus OÜ. Used for JTAC training and as OPFOR aircraft.

Note : Three C-17 Globemaster IIIs are available through the Heavy Airlift Wing based in Hungary.

=== Unmanned aerial vehicles ===
Model	Image	Origin	Type	Quantity	Notes
Threod Systems Stream C		Estonia	Unmanned aerial vehicle		
Threod Systems KX-4 LE Titan		Estonia	Unmanned aerial vehicle		
AeroVironment RQ-20 Puma		United States	Unmanned aerial vehicle		Undisclosed number of RQ-20B Puma AE II systems to be delivered by 2021.
IAI Harpy		Israel	Loitering munition		IAI Mini Harpy ordered in 2023.

== Air defence ==
=== Air surveillance ===
Model	Image	Origin	Type	Quantity	Notes
VERA-E		Czech Republic	Passive radar	1	Purchased in 2004.
Giraffe AMB		Sweden	Passive electronically scanned array	4 or 5	
Giraffe 1X		Sweden	Active electronically scanned array		On order.
AN/TPS-77		United States	Passive electronically scanned array	1	Purchased in 2003 and modernized in 2014.
Ground Master 403, 400a		France	Active electronically scanned array	2 GM403, 1 GM400a (1 GM400a on order)	Two GM403 radars purchased in 2009. At one point around 2012, these were mounted or were planned to be mounted on Sisu E13TP trucks. Two GM400a model radars ordered in 2023. One received 2025, one expected 2026.
GCA-2020		United States	Precision approach radar	1	Transportable version ordered in 2013.
AN/TSQ-288		United States	Surface search and navigation radar		
PGSR-3i Beagle		Hungary	Man-portable passive radar		Used for airspace and border surveillance.

== See also ==
- Former equipment of the Maavägi
- List of equipment of the Estonian Defence League
- List of active Estonian Navy ships
- List of Estonian Navy ships
- Estonian Air Force Equipment
- List of historic Estonian Air Force aircraft
- Estonian Special Operations Force Equipment
