= List of historic Estonian Air Force aircraft =

The Estonian Air Force had more than 130 aircraft in the middle of the 1930s. Estonian engineers had previously designed and constructed several trainer and light fighter aircraft types, of which the most famous is the PTO-4 which entered service in 1938 as a military training aircraft.
Before the Soviet occupation, Estonia had placed an order for 12 Supermarine Spitfire fighters and 2 Westland Lysander aircraft from Britain, and was also seeking to purchase 12 Messerschmitt Bf 109 fighters from Germany. Deliveries were interrupted by the start of World War II and the Spitfires later served in the Royal Air Force.

== Aircraft ==
=== 1918-1940: From independence to Soviet occupation of 1940 ===
This is a list of aircraft formerly used by the Estonian Õhukaitse during the period starting from the Estonian independence of 1918 to the Soviet occupation of 1940:

Reconnaissance aircraft

- Halberstadt CL.IV: 4
- Halberstadt C.V: 5
- RAF BE2e: 2
- Shchetinin M-16: 1
- Farman HF.30: 1
- DFW C.V: 4
- AGO C.IV: 1
- FBA Type H: 1
- Friedrichshafen FF.41AT: 1
- Letov 228E: 4
- Henschel Hs 126B-1: 5
- Short 184: 6
- Lebedev 12: 1

Trainer aircraft

- Avro 504K: 12
- Avro 504R: 12
- Avro 594 Avian: 6
- Avro 626 Prefect: 4
- Avro Anson: 1
- PN-3: 1
- PTO-4: 6
- Hanriot HD.14: 2
- PON-1A: 4
- Miles Magister: 1

Fighter aircraft

- Sopwith Camel 2F1: 1
- Nieuport 17: 2
- Nieuport 21: 1
- Nieuport 23: 1
- Nieuport 24bis: 3
- Gourdou-Leseurre GL-22: 15
- Grigorovich M-11: 1
- SPAD S.VII: 2
- Bristol Bulldog Mk.II: 12
- Siskin IIIDC: 2

Bomber aircraft

- RAF RE8: 8
- Potez 25 A.2: 9
- Hawker Hart: 8
- Airco DH.9: 13

Multi-role aircraft

- Sopwith 1½ Strutter: 1

Flying Boat

- Norman Thompson NT2B: 2

=== 1991-present: After the end of Soviet occupation ===
This is a list of aircraft used and in use by Estonian Air Force after the end of post-WW2 Soviet occupation and resumption of Estonia's de facto independence in 1991 (de jure independence having been continuous during Soviet occupation due to Estonia's government in exile):

Transport aircraft

- Let L-410UVP: 2
- M28 Skytruck: 2
- Antonov An-2: 2

Helicopters

- Mi-2: 3
- Mi-8: 4
- Robinson R44: 4

Jet Trainer aircraft

- Aero L-39 Albatros: 2 Leased from a Czech company.

Trainer aircraft

- Wilga 35: 1

== See also ==
- Military of Estonia
- List of active Estonian Air Force aircraft

== Notes and references ==
- Gerdessen, Frederik "Estonian Air Power 1918 - 1945". Air Enthusiast No 18, April - July 1982. Pages 61–76. ISSN 0143-5450.
- Humberstone, Richard. Estonian Air Force, 1918-1940 (Insignia Air Force Special No.3). London: Blue Rider Publishing, 1999.
- Gerdessen, Frederik; Kitvel, Toivo and Tilk, Johannes. "Aeg, mehed, lennukid" Tallinn: Eesti Entsüklopeediakirjastus 2001
- Kitvel, Toivo and Tilk, Johannes ""Eesti lennukroonika: tekste ja pilte aastani 1940" Tallinn: Aviopol 2003
