= Loire 130 =

French flying boat that saw service during World War II

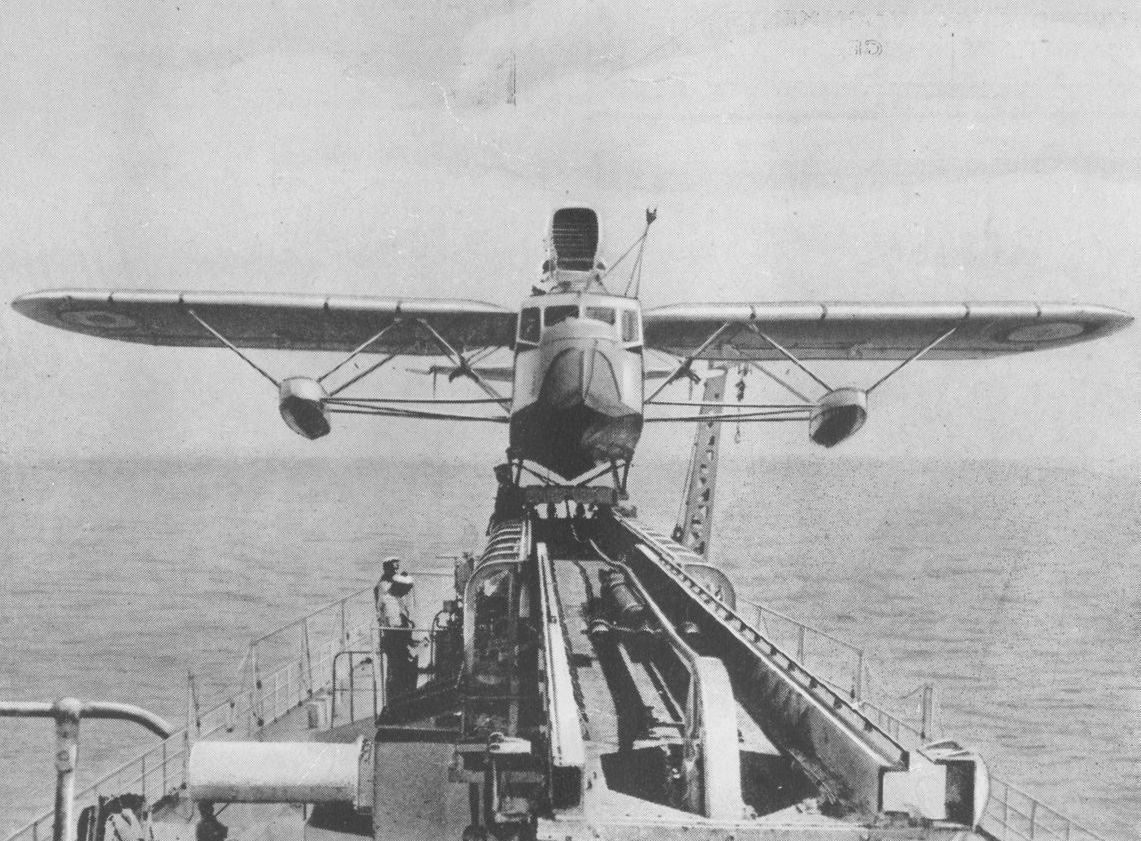
- Loire 130 on catapult

General information
- Type: Reconnaissance flying boat
- Manufacturer: Loire
- Primary users: French Navy French Air Force
- Number built: 125

History
- Manufactured: 1937–1942
- Introduction date: 1937
- First flight: November 19, 1934
- Retired: 1951

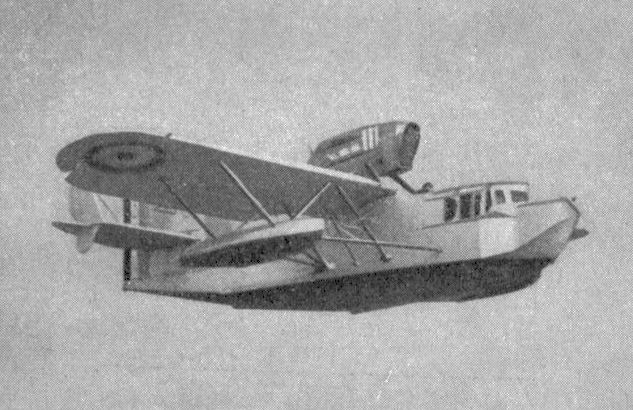
Loire 130, January 1940

The Loire 130 was a French flying boat that saw service during World War II. It was designed and built by Loire Aviation of St Nazaire.

== Development ==
The Loire 130 originated from a mid-1930s requirement from the French Navy for a reconnaissance seaplane or flying boat that could also serve aboard French battleships and cruisers. Chosen in 1936 against five competitors (Bréguet 610, Gourdou-Leseurre GL-820 HY, Levasseur PL.200, CAMS 120), the Loire 130's performance was deemed to be good and production orders for 150 of the machines were placed. It entered production in 1937 and replaced most shipborne seaplanes and flying boats already in service.

== Operational service ==
In the late 1930s, Loire 130s were serving aboard most battleships and cruisers of the French Navy, as well as aboard the seaplane tender Commandant Teste. Despite attrition from the German invasion, quite a few Loire 130s survived the war and remained in post-war French service, especially in French colonies until 1951.

== Variants ==
Loire 130 M
Production version.
Loire 130 Cl
Colonial variant with enlarged radiator and Hispano-Suiza 12Ycrs

== Operators ==
France

- French Air Force
- French Navy

Vichy France

- Vichy French Air Force

== Specifications (Loire 130 M) ==
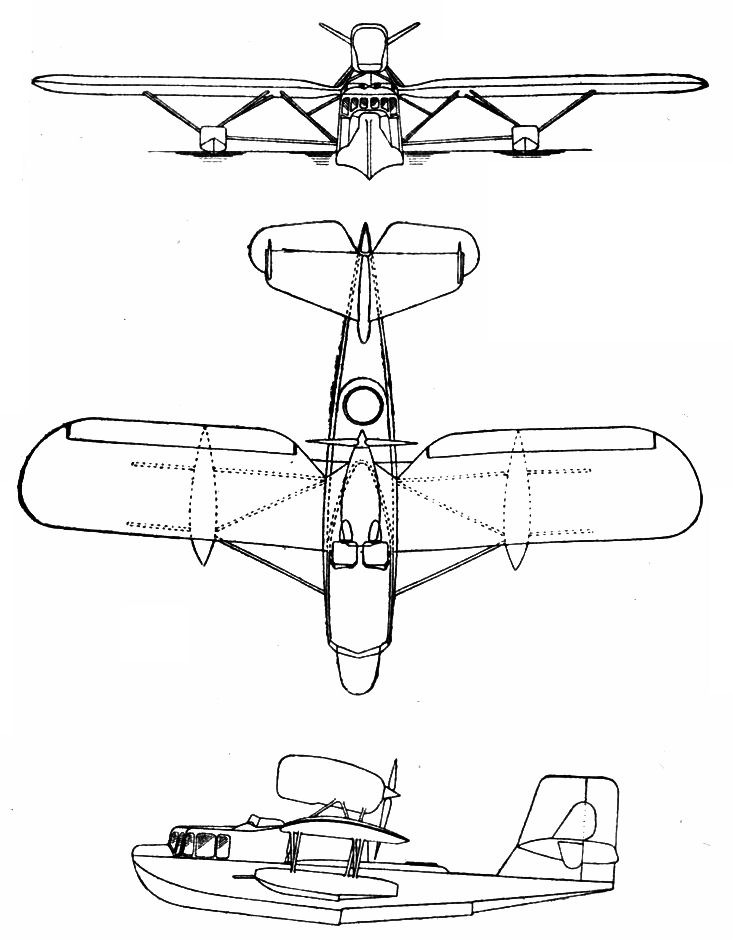
Loire 130 3-view drawing from L'Aerophile June 1944

Data from War Planes of the Second World War: Volume Five Flying Boats

General characteristics

- Crew: 3
- Capacity: 4 passengers (as transport)
- Length: 11.300 m (37 ft 0 7/8 in)
- Wingspan: 15.999 m (52 ft 5 7/8 in)
- Height: 3.848 m (12 ft 7 1/2 in)
- Wing area: 38.17 m^{2} (410.9 sq ft)
- Empty weight: 2,050 kg (4,519 lb)
- Gross weight: 3,260 kg (7,187 lb) (catapult launch)
- Max takeoff weight: 3,500 kg (7,716 lb)
- Powerplant: 1 × Hispano-Suiza 12Xirs liquid-cooled V12 engine, 540 kW (720 hp)

Performance

- Maximum speed: 220 km/h (137 mph, 119 kn) at 2,100 m (6,890 ft)
- Cruise speed: 164 km/h (102 mph, 89 kn) at 1,500 m (4,920 ft)
- Endurance: 7.5 hr at 150 km/h (93 mph) and 500 m (1,640 ft)
- Service ceiling: 6,000 m (19,685 ft)
- Time to altitude: 12 min to 3,000 m (9,840 ft)

Armament

- Guns: 2 x 7.5 mm Darne machine guns
- Bombs: 2 x 75 kg (165 lb) bombs

== See also ==
Related lists

- List of aircraft of the French Air Force during World War II
- List of aircraft of World War II
- List of Interwar military aircraft
- List of flying boats and floatplanes

== Bibliography ==
- Bousquet, Gérard. French Flying Boats of WW II. Sandomierz, Poland: Stratus, 2013 ISBN 978-83-63678-06-7
- Green, William (1962). War Planes of the Second World War: Volume Five Flying Boats. Macdonald:London. ISBN 0-356-01449-5
- Morareau, Lucien (2002). Les aéronefs de l'aviation maritime (1910–1942). ARDHAN, ISBN 2-913344-04-6
- Young, Edward M. (1984). "France's Forgotten Air War". Air Enthusiast. No. 25. pp. 22–33. ISSN 0143-5450.
