= Aviotehas =

Aircraft manufacturer from Estonia

- Company type: Military equipment overhaul and manufacture
- Industry: Military equipment
- Founded: 1927
- Defunct: 1940
- Headquarters: Tallinn, Estonia
- Parent: Lennuväerügement

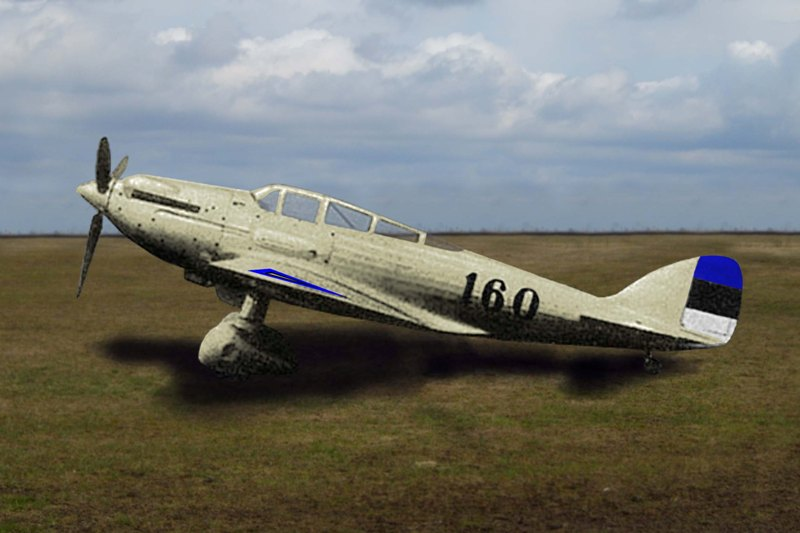
Aviotehas PN-3

Aviotehas (1927–1939 named as Aviotöökoda) was a military unit and a company which dealt with constructing and repairing of military aircraft, based at Lasnamäe, Tallinn in Estonia.

Between 1927 and 1930, Aviotehas was part of the military unit Lennuväerügement.

== Aircraft ==
Model name	First flight	Number built	Type
Aviotehas PN-3	1939	1	Reconnaissance fighter
