= Gourdou-Leseurre GL.30 =

French racing aircraft

GL.30
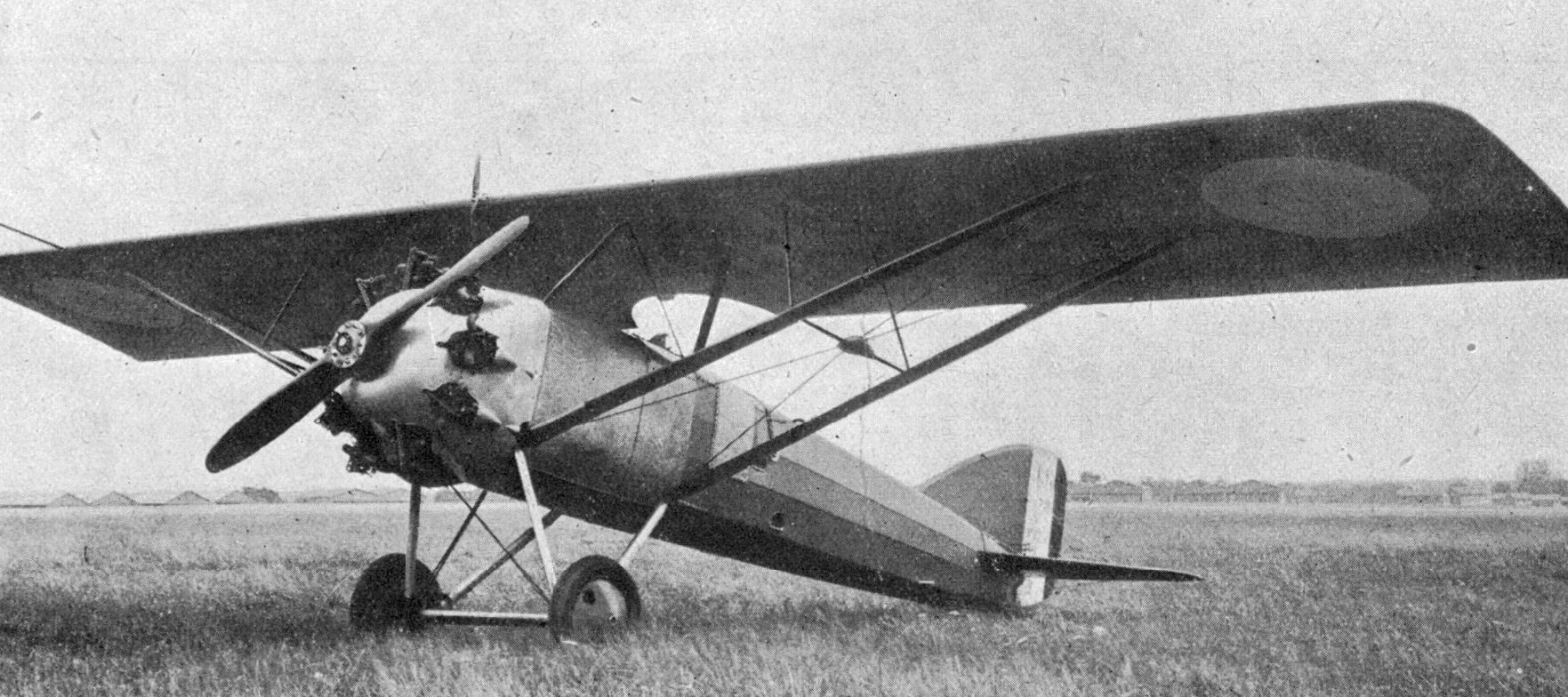
- Gourdou-Leseurre GL-32 (LGL.32)

General information
- Type: Fighter
- National origin: France
- Manufacturer: Gourdou-Leseurre
- Primary users: Aéronautique Militaire Aéronautique Maritime
- Number built: >500

History
- First flight: 1920

The Gourdou-Leseurre GL.30 was a racing aircraft built in France in 1920 which formed the basis for a highly successful family of fighter aircraft based on the same design.

== Development ==
The GL-30 was a parasol-wing monoplane with retractable undercarriage and a Bristol Jupiter engine. Like most of Gordou-Lesserre's earlier aircraft, it was a parasol wing design but its planform was trapezoidal rather than rectangular. In 1923 it flew the Coupe Beaumont course at an impressive 360 km/h (220 mph; 190 kn). The GL.30 was the basis of a new fighter, the GL.31, which had a greater span, almost double the wing area, a fixed undercarriage, and a Gnome-Rhône 9A engine. It was armed with four machine guns, two in the forward fuselage and two in the wings. The GL. 31 was not flown until 1926 and then abandoned, overtaken by the GL.32, the company's entry in a 1923 Aéronautique Militaire competition to select a new fighter. It returned to a rectangular plan wing.

== Operational history ==
By the time this prototype flew, the Gourdou-Leseurre had been acquired by Loire, and therefore the new aircraft was entered as the LGL.32. Placed second in the trials, the type's performance was impressive enough to still result in an order in January 1927 for a small batch of aircraft - five evaluation aircraft and 20 preproduction machines. Eventually, 475 of this basic version, dubbed LGL.32C.1 in service, would be ordered by the Aéronautique Militaire and 15 more by the Aéronautique Maritime. Romania ordered a further 50 aircraft of the same design as the examples in French service, Turkey ordered 12 (these designated LGL.32-T) and another one may have been purchased by Japan.

In French service, development turned from fighters to adapting the aircraft as a carrier-borne dive bomber. These featured general strengthening of the airframe, divided main undercarriage units, and a "fork" under the fuselage able to release a 50 kg (110 lb) bomb from under the fuselage while avoiding hitting the propeller.

While prolific, the GL.32 was not long-lasting, and attrition took a heavy toll on them. By 1934, all remaining examples were relegated to training and as instructional airframes; at the start of 1936, only 135 remained of the original 380 purchased. A number of these were sold to the government of the Second Spanish Republic and to the autonomous Basque Government. Another aircraft was supplied to the Basques in 1937, modified as a dive bomber along the lines of the previous French experiments. Designated the GL.633, this aircraft was used by Miguel Zambudio to attack the Nationalist battleship España, scoring decisive hits that contributed substantially to her subsequent sinking.

== Variants ==
=== GL.30 ===
- GL.30 - Racer with retractable undercarriage and Bristol Jupiter engine (one built)
- GL.31 - Four-gun fighter prototype with fixed undercarriage, longer-span wings and Gnome-Rhône 9A engine (one built). Also known as the GL.31C.1 or CL-I-3.
- LGL.32 - Definitive two-gun fighter version (ca. 490 built). Also known as the GL.32C.1.
  - LGL.32.01 - The first prototype.
  - LGL.32T - Export version for Turkey (12 built)
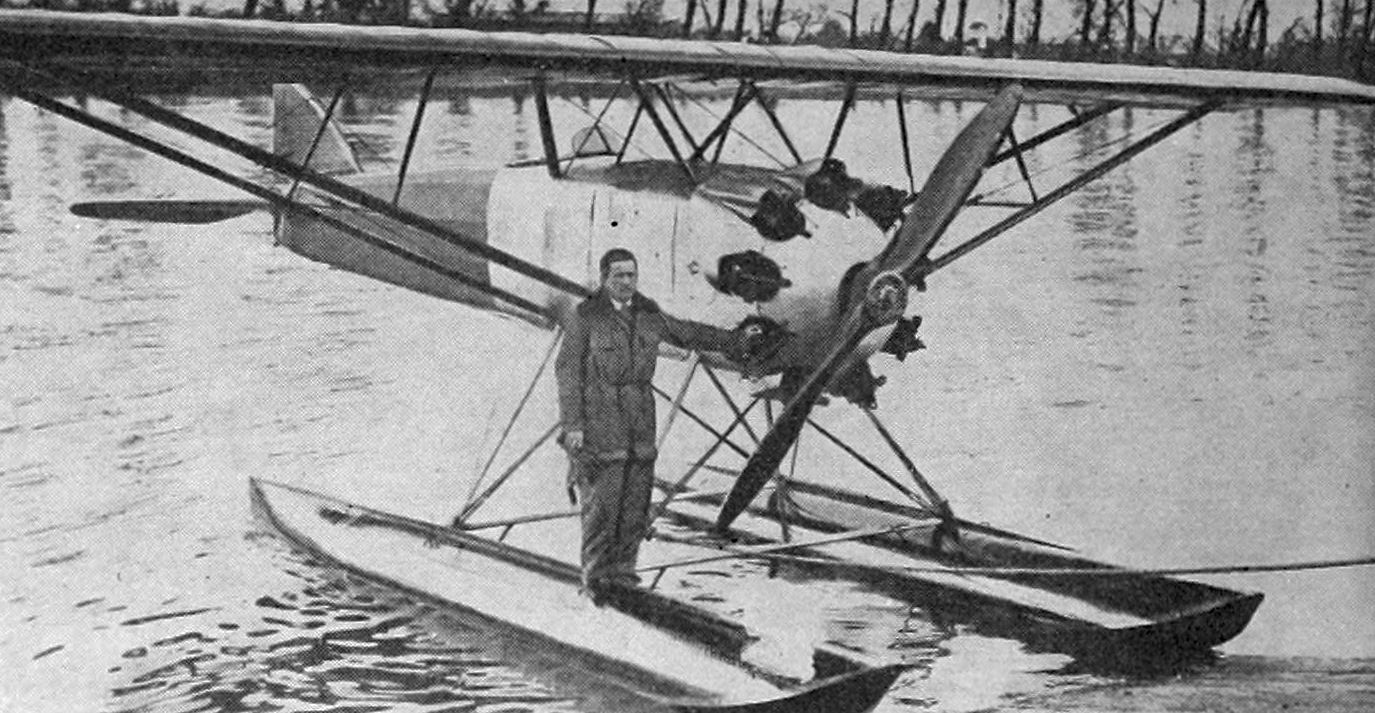
    LGL 32 Hy photo from Aero Digest May 1927
  - LGL.32 Hy - Twin-pontoon floatplane version converted from LGL.32 prototype. Set world seaplane altitude record on 28 March 1927 (one converted)
  - LGL.321 - LGL.32 converted to use 450 kW (600 hp) version of the Gnome & Rhône 9Ac (one converted)
  - LGL.323 - LGL.32 converted to use supercharged 373 kW (600 hp) Bristol Jupiter for unsuccessful altitude record attempts. (one converted)
  - LGL.324 - LGL.323 further modified and used by Pierre Lemoigne to set world landplane altitude record with 500 kg payload of 9,600 m (31,500 ft) on 23 May 1929 and Albert Lécrivain to set world landplane altitude record of 11,000 m (39,090 ft) on 24 October. (one converted)
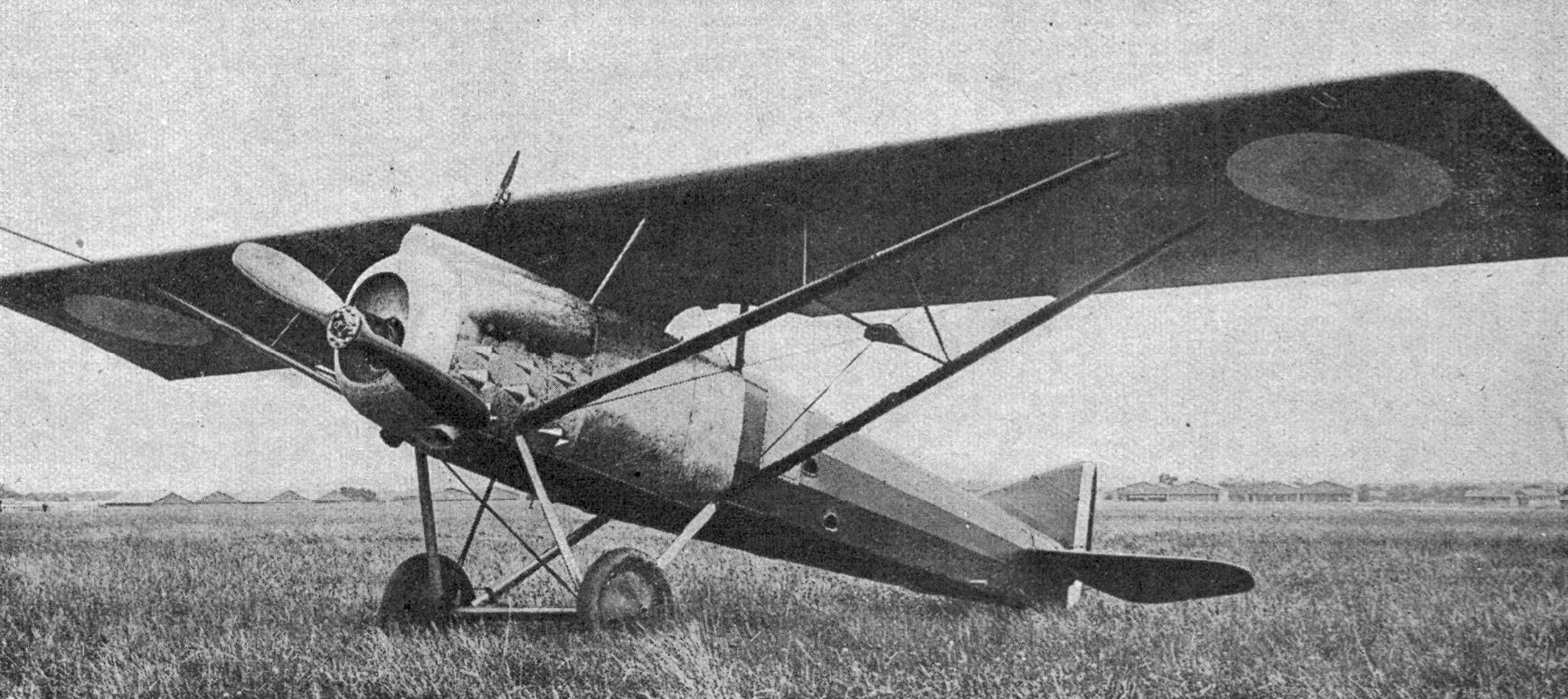
- Gourdou-Leseurre LGL.33 C.1 photo from L'Aéronautique December,1926
  LGL.33 - Similar to LGL.32 but with Lorraine 12Eb engine, and revised wing struts, landing gear, and tail (one built). Also known as the LGL.33C.1.
- LGL.34 - Similar to LGL.32 but with Hispano-Suiza 12Gb engine (one built). Also known as the LGL.34C.1.
  - LGL.341 - similar to LGL.32 with Hispano-Suiza 12Hb engine (two built, second with revised radiator arrangement)
- LGL.35
  - LGL.351 - version with Renault 12J engine (one built)
- LGL.390 - night fighter prototype with Hispano-Suiza 9Va engine (one converted from LGL.32)

=== GL.40 ===
- GL.410 - modernised fighter with divided main undercarriage (one built)
- GL.430 - strengthened carrier-borne dive-bomber prototype (one built)
  - GL.432 - dive-bomber variant similar to GL.430 used for operational testing (four built)
- GL.450 - fighter version
- GL.480
  - GL-482 - fighter version with Hispano-Suiza 12Xbrs engine (one built)

=== GL.520 ===
- GL.520
  - GL.521 - dive-bomber version with Gnome-Rhône 9Kfr engine and taller tail fin (two built)

=== GL.60 ===
- GL.630
  - GL.633 - dive-bomber similar to GL.432 (one built)

== Operators ==
Bolivia

- Fuerza Aérea Boliviana Gourdou-Leseurre LGL 32 C-1, only one used in the Chaco War.

France

- French Air Force
- French Navy

Romania

- Royal Romanian Air Force

Spain

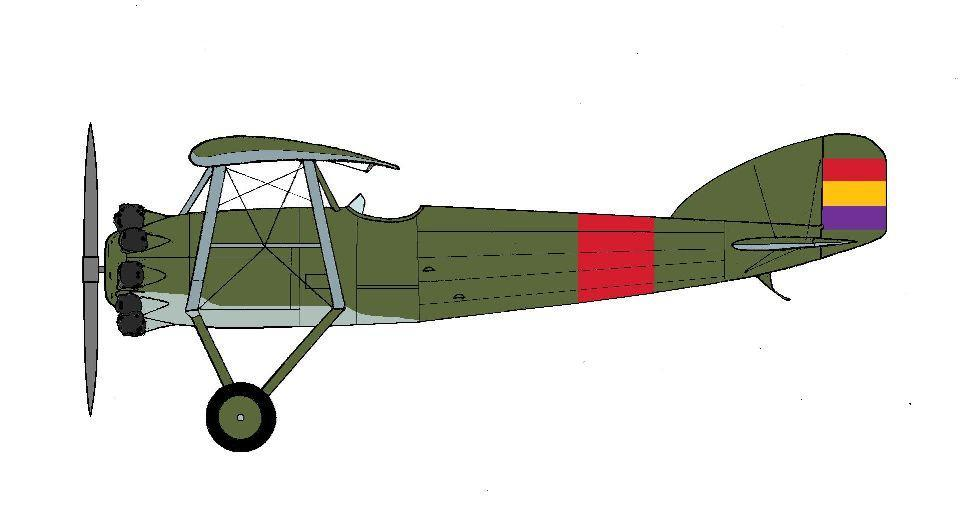
Gourdou-Leseurre GL-32 Spanish Republican AF

- Spanish Republican Air Force - GL.32

Turkey

- Turkish Air Force

== Specifications (LGL-32 C.1 - Jupiter VIII engine) ==
Data from Jane's all the World's Aircraft 1928

General characteristics

- Crew: 1
- Length: 7.55 m (24 ft 9 in)
- Wingspan: 12.2 m (40 ft 0 in)
- Height: 2.95 m (9 ft 8 in)
- Wing area: 24.9 m^{2} (268 sq ft)
- Empty weight: 963 kg (2,123 lb)
- Gross weight: 1,376 kg (3,034 lb)
- Fuel capacity: 285 kg (628 lb) - (ca. 200 L (53 US gal; 44 imp gal))
- Powerplant: 1 × Gnome et Rhône 9A Jupiter VIII 9-cylinder air-cooled radial piston engine, 450 kW (600 hp)
- Propellers: 2-bladed wooden fixed pitch propeller

Performance

- Maximum speed: 270 km/h (170 mph, 150 kn) at sea level

260 km/h (160 mph; 140 kn) at 3,000 m (9,800 ft)
251 km/h (156 mph; 136 kn) at 5,000 m (16,000 ft)
215 km/h (134 mph; 116 kn) at 8,000 m (26,000 ft)

- Landing speed: 90 km/h (56 mph; 49 kn)
- Range: 500 km (310 mi, 270 nmi)
- Service ceiling: 9,700 m (31,800 ft)
- Time to altitude: 2,000 m (6,600 ft) in 3 minutes 5 seconds; 5,000 m (16,000 ft) in 11 minutes; 8,000 m (26,000 ft) in 31 minutes
- Wing loading: 54.8 kg/m^{2} (11.2 lb/sq ft)
- Power/mass: 0.33 kW/kg (0.2 hp/lb)

Armament

- Guns: 2x synchronised forward firing 7.7 mm (0.303 in) Vickers or Darne machine-guns in the fuselage with 2x un-synchronised 7.7 mm (0.303 in) Darne machine-guns in the wings firing outside the propeller disc.

== See also ==
Related lists

- List of Interwar military aircraft
- List of aircraft of the Spanish Republican Air Force

== Bibliography ==
- Bruner, Georges (1977). "Fighters a la Francaise, Part One". Air Enthusiast (3): 85–95. ISSN 0143-5450.
- Taylor, Michael J. H. (1989). Jane's Encyclopedia of Aviation. London: Studio Editions. pp. 429–30.
- World Aircraft Information Files. London: Bright Star Publishing. pp. File 895 Sheets 10–11.
