= Gourdou-Leseurre GL-812 HY =

812 HY
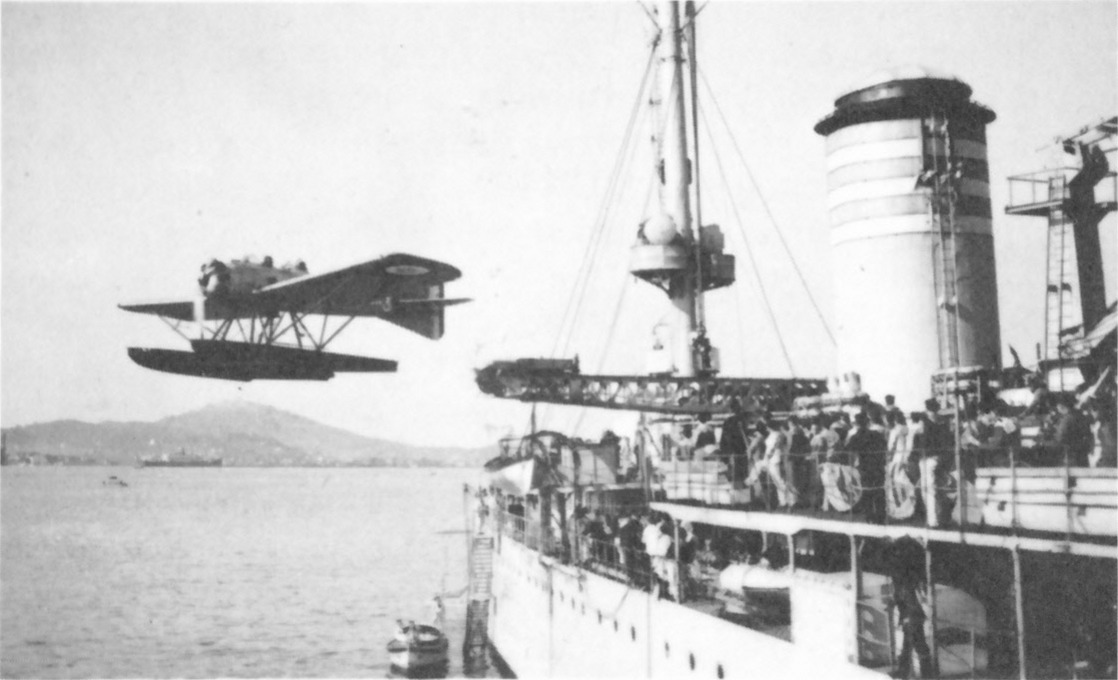

General information
- Type: reconnaissance floatplane
- Manufacturer: Gourdou-Leseurre
- Number built: 86

History
- Introduction date: 23 September 1930
- Retired: 1940

The Gourdou-Leseurre GL-812 HY was a 3-seat reconnaissance floatplane, built by Gourdou-Leseurre.

== Development ==
The prototype, called L-2, was built in 1926-27. It has a steel tube fuselage, and rectangular wooden wing. The tail was two fins, one above and one below the fuselage. The entire plane was fabric covered, except the 283 kW (380 hp) Gnome-Rhône 9A Jupiter engine, which was left uncowled. The prototype was flown to Copenhagen, and demonstrated there to several countries.

Six prototype L-3s were constructed. They had a larger 313 kW (420 hp) Jupiter, steel spars instead of wood, and stronger struts, allowing for shipboard catapult launching. After successfully testing the L-3, the French navy ordered 14 production GL-810 HY aircraft. The first production 810 HY flew on 23 September 1930, taking off from the Seine at Les Mureaux. In 1931, 20 GL-811 HYs were ordered, for operation from the seaplane carrier Commandant Teste and from 1933 to 1934 twenty-nine GL-812 HYs and thirteen GL-813 HYs were ordered.

== Variants ==
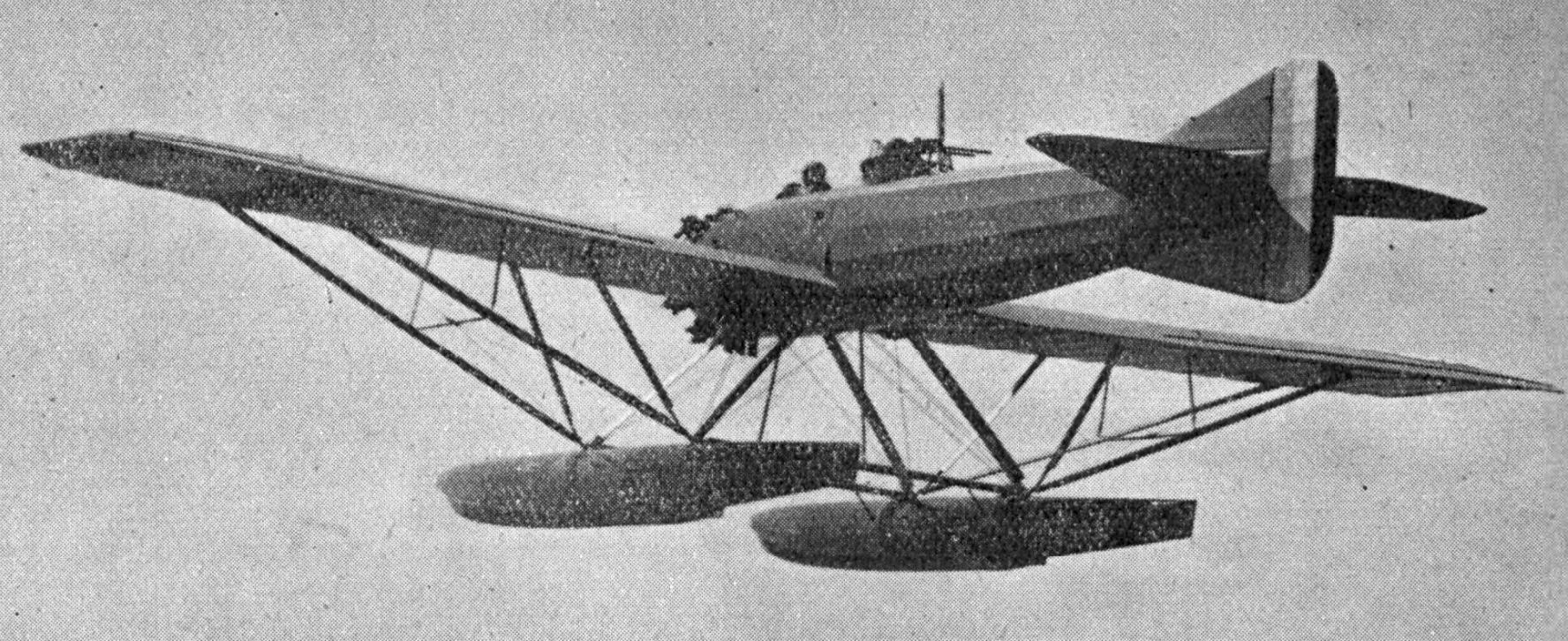
Gourdou-Leseurre L-2 photo from L'Aérophile October,1927

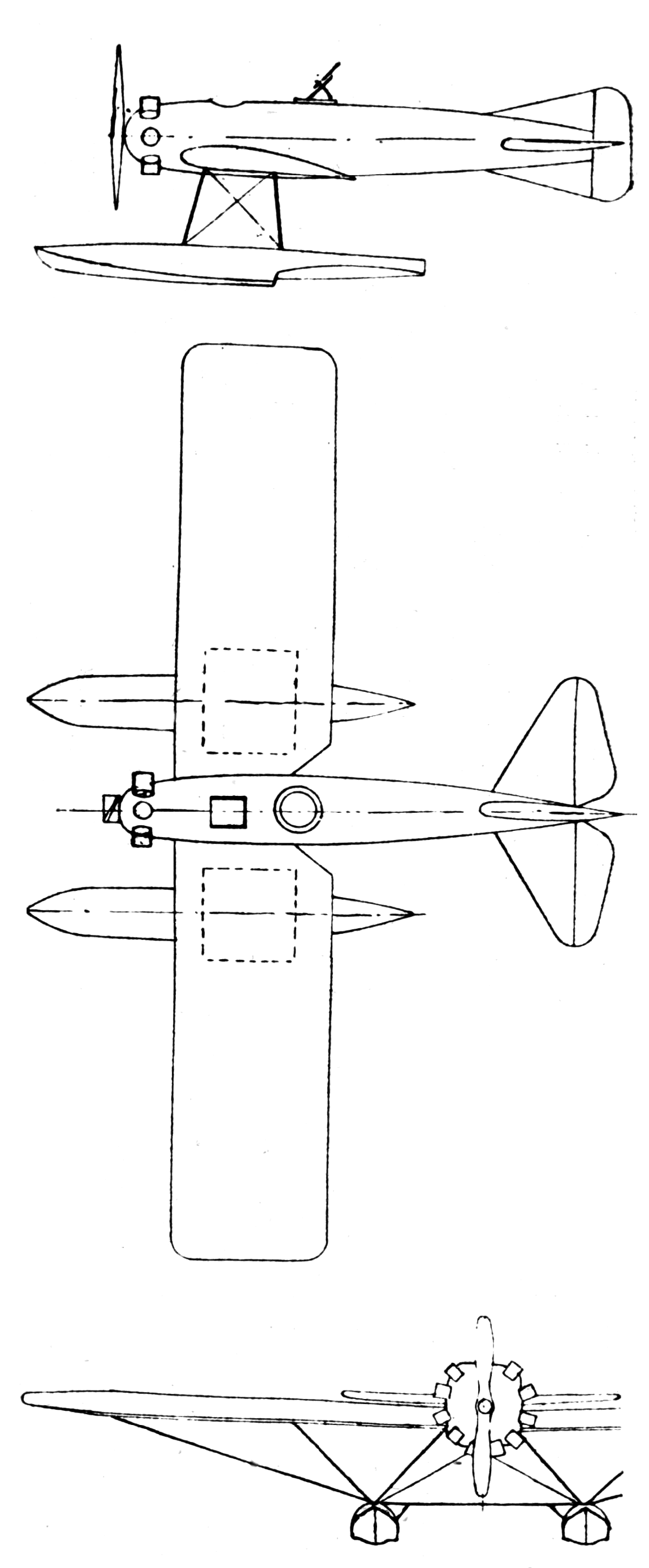
Gourdou-Leseurre L-2 3-view drawing from L'Aérophile October,1927

Gourdou-Leseurre L-2
The initial prototype of the catapult-launched floatplane observation aircraft.
Gourdou-Leseurre L-3
Six prototype development aircraft with revised structure.
Gourdou-Leseurre GL-810 HY
Initial production - 24 produced for Aeronavale.
Gourdou-Leseurre GL-811 HY
Developed version - 20 built from 1931.
Gourdou-Leseurre GL-812 HY
29 built 1933-34.
Gourdou-Leseurre GL-813 HY
13 built.

== Operators ==
France

- French Navy

=== Units using this aircraft ===
- Escadrille 7S2 (Commandant Teste)
- Escadrille 7S3 (spread among various cruisers)
- Escadrilles 1S1, 2S1, 2S4, 3S1, 3S2, 3S3, 3S6, 8S2, 8S5.

While most aircraft had been retired by 1939, that August the remaining aircraft were brought together to re-equip the recently re-activated and mobilized Escadrilles 1S2 and 3S3 at Cherbourg and Berre-l'Étang, respectively and perform coastal anti-submarine patrols.

== Specifications (812 HY) ==
Data from The Encyclopedia of World Aircraft, Aviafrance : Gourdou Leseurre GL-812 HY

General characteristics

- Crew: 3 (pilot, observer, gunner)
- Length: 10.49 m (34 ft 5 in)
- Wingspan: 16 m (52 ft 6 in)
- Height: 3.86 m (12 ft 8 in)
- Wing area: 41 m^{2} (440 sq ft)
- Empty weight: 1,690 kg (3,726 lb)
- Gross weight: 2,460 kg (5,423 lb)
- Powerplant: 1 × Gnome & Rhône 9Ady Jupiter 9-cylinder air-cooled radial piston engine, 310 kW (420 hp)

Performance

- Maximum speed: 200 km/h (120 mph, 110 kn)
- Range: 560 km (350 mi, 300 nmi)
- Service ceiling: 6,000 m (20,000 ft)

Armament

- Guns: 1 x fixed forward-firing synchronised 7.7 mm (0.303 in) machine gun and 2 x 7.7 mm (0.303 in) Vickers machine guns on a flexible mount in the rear cockpit
- Bombs: 150 kg (330 lb)

== See also ==
Related lists

- List of aircraft of World War II
- List of Interwar military aircraft
- List of flying boats and floatplanes

== Bibliography ==
- Cortet, Pierre (June 2000). "Rétros du Mois" [Retros of the Month]. Avions: Toute l'Aéronautique et son histoire (in French) (87): 6. ISSN 1243-8650.
- Donald, David, ed. (1997). The Encyclopedia of World Aircraft. Prospero Books. p. 463. ISBN 1-85605-375-X.
