= Gourdou-Leseurre =

French aircraft manufacturer

- Industry: Aeronautics, defence
- Founded: 1921
- Founder: Charles Gourdou and Jean Leseurre
- Defunct: 1934
- Headquarters: Saint Maur-des-Fossés, France
- Products: Aircraft
- Parent: Ateliers et Chantiers de la Loire (1925 - 1928)

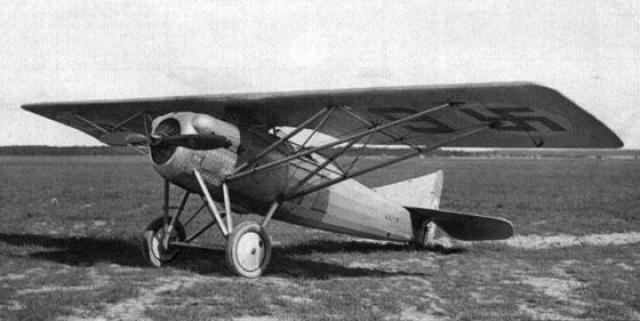
A Gourdou-Leseurre GL.22 of the Finnish Air Force in 1944.

Gourdou-Leseurre was a French aircraft manufacturer whose founders were Charles Edouard Pierre Gourdou and Jean Adolphe Leseurre.

== History ==
Engineers Jean Leseurre and his brother-in-law Charles Gourdou founded the Établissements Gourdou-Leseurre in Saint Maur-des-Fossés, southeast of Paris in 1921. The factory assembled military aircraft under license, such as the Breguet 14, until Gourdou and Leseurre began building their own aircraft as main designers.

Between 1925 and 1928, Gourdou-Leseurre was taken over by the Ateliers et Chantiers de la Loire shipyard, together with Loire and Loire-Nieuport. The aircraft produced at that time by the Gourdou-Leseurre company were known as 'Loire-Gourdou', carrying the LGL denomination instead of GL.

In the 1930s strong disagreements developed between Charles Gourdou and Jean Adolphe Leseurre. This eventually led to a break-up of their professional relationship and the demise of the company in 1934.

== Aircraft ==
The company was active until 1934, producing mostly light military aircraft and seaplanes.

- Gourdou-Leseurre Type A
- Gourdou-Leseurre Type B
- Gourdou-Leseurre GL.21
- Gourdou-Leseurre GL.22
- Gourdou-Leseurre GL.23
- Gourdou-Leseurre GL.30
- Gourdou-Leseurre GL.31
- Gourdou-Leseurre LGL.32
- Gourdou-Leseurre GL-33
- Gourdou-Leseurre GL-341
- Gourdou-Leseurre GL-351
- Gourdou-Leseurre GL-40
- Gourdou-Leseurre GL-430
- Gourdou-Leseurre GL-432
- Gourdou-Leseurre GL-450
- Gourdou-Leseurre GL-482
- Gourdou-Leseurre GL-50
- Gourdou-Leseurre GL-51
- Gourdou-Leseurre GL-521
- Gourdou-Leseurre GL-633
- Gourdou-Leseurre GL-810 HY
- Gourdou-Leseurre GL-811 HY
- Gourdou-Leseurre GL-812 HY
- Gourdou-Leseurre GL-813 HY
- Gourdou-Leseurre GL-820 HY
- Gourdou-Leseurre GL-821 HY
- Gourdou-Leseurre GL-821 HY 02
- Gourdou-Leseurre GL-831 HY
- Gourdou-Leseurre GL-832 HY
