= Gourdou-Leseurre Type A =

Type A, GL.1

General information
- Type: Fighter
- National origin: France
- Manufacturer: Gourdou-Leseurre
- Designer: Charles Gourdou and Jean Leseurre
- Number built: 1

History
- First flight: March 1918

The Gourdou-Leseurre Type A, retrospectively named the GL.1, was a prototype fighter aircraft built in France in 1918. It was a conventional parasol-wing monoplane with fixed tailskid undercarriage, with main units connected by a cross-axle. The pilot sat in an open cockpit. Construction was of fabric-covered wood and steel. Initial flight testing revealed performance superior to most contemporary biplane fighters and led to an order of 100 aircraft being placed. However, further tests suggested that the aircraft structure could be considerably lightened, and that the wing needed to be stiffened, leading to a cancellation of the order.

Only a single prototype was built, but this led to the development of the successful Gourdou-Leseurre Type B.

== Operators ==
France

- French Air Force

== Specifications ==
General characteristics

- Crew: One pilot
- Length: 6.60 m (21 ft 8 in)
- Wingspan: 9.00 m (29 ft 6 in)
- Height: 2.30 m (7 ft 7 in)
- Wing area: 16.6 m^{2} (179 sq ft)
- Empty weight: 594 kg (1,309 lb)
- Gross weight: 780 kg (1,720 lb)
- Powerplant: 1 × Hispano-Suiza 8Ab , 134 kW (180 hp)

Performance

- Maximum speed: 242 km/h (150 mph, 130 kn)
- Range: 300 km (190 mi, 170 nmi)
- Service ceiling: 7,000 m (23,000 ft)
- Rate of climb: 5.8 m/s (1,140 ft/min)

Armament

- 2 × fixed, forward-firing .303 Vickers machine guns
