= French seaplane carrier Commandant Teste =

French seaplane tender

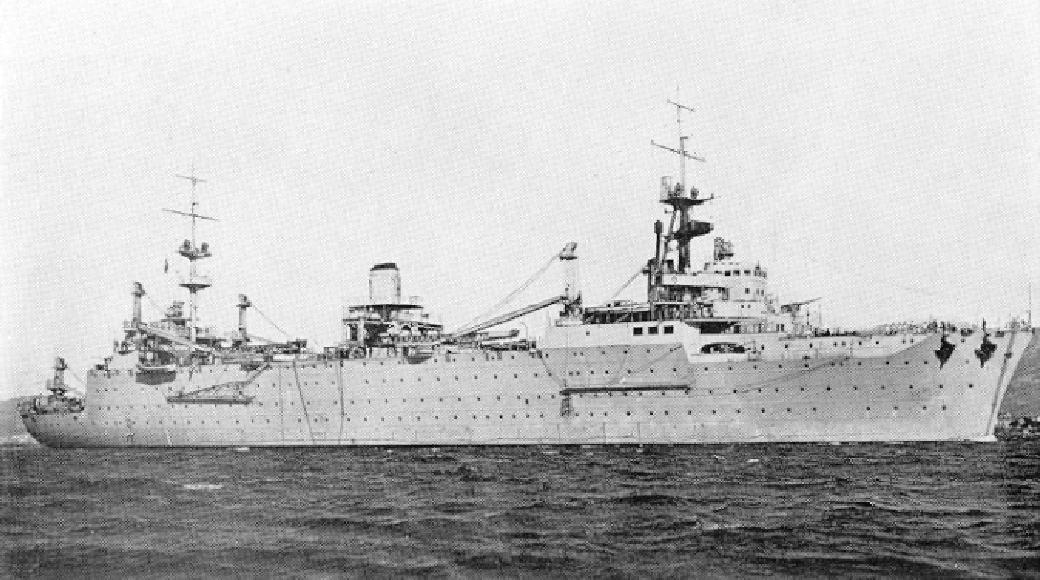
- Commandant Teste

History

France
- Name: Commandant Teste
- Namesake: Paul Teste
- Builder: Forges et Chantiers de la Gironde, Lormont
- Laid down: 6 September 1927
- Launched: 12 April 1929
- In service: 18 April 1932
- Reclassified: As gunnery training ship June 1941
- Fate: Scuttled on 27 November 1942, raised February 1945, sold for scrap 15 May 1950

General characteristics
- Type: Seaplane tender
- Displacement: 10,000 long tons (10,160 t) (standard); 12,134 tonnes (11,942 long tons) (full load)
- Length: 167 m (547 ft 11 in)
- Beam: 27 m (88 ft 7 in)
- Draft: 6.7 m (22 ft 0 in)
- Installed power: 4 water-tube boilers; 23,230 shp (17,320 kW)
- Propulsion: 2 × shafts; 2 × geared steam turbines
- Speed: 21 knots (39 km/h; 24 mph)
- Range: 2,000 nmi (3,700 km; 2,300 mi) at 18 knots (33 km/h; 21 mph)
- Complement: 644
- Armament: 12 × single 100 mm (3.9 in) guns; 8 × single 37 mm (1.5 in) AA guns; 6 × twin 13.2 mm (0.5 in) machine guns
- Armor: Belt: 3–5 cm (1.2–2.0 in); Deck: 2.4–3.6 cm (0.9–1.4 in); Conning tower: 8 cm (3.1 in)
- Aircraft carried: 26 seaplanes
- Aviation facilities: 4 × catapults; 5 × recovery cranes

Commandant Teste was a large seaplane tender of the French Navy (French: Marine Nationale) built before World War II. She was designed to be as large as possible without counting against the Washington Treaty limits. During the Spanish Civil War, she protected neutral merchant shipping and played a limited role during World War II as she spent the early part of the war in North African waters or acting as an aviation transport between France and North Africa. She was slightly damaged during the British bombardment of the French Fleet at Mers-el-Kébir in July 1940. Commandant Teste was scuttled at Toulon when the Germans invaded Vichy France in November 1942, but was refloated after the war and considered for conversion to an escort or training carrier. Neither proposal was accepted and she was sold for scrap in 1950.

== Design ==
After the completion of aircraft carrier Béarn, the Marine Nationale desired another aviation vessel, but the lack of another hull that could cheaply be converted made another aircraft carrier too expensive. It settled for a seaplane carrier (transport d'aviation) that could act as a mobile aviation base and support seaplanes for a specific attack. The ship was restricted to a maximum size of 10,000 t (9,800 long tons) at standard displacement, which prevented her from counting against France's Washington Treaty capital ship allocation (she could not have been counted as an aircraft carrier, because she did not meet the Washington Treaty requirement for aircraft to be able to launch from the ship and land back on). This also served to keep her costs relatively low.

== Description ==
Commandant Teste was 167 m (547 ft 11 in) long overall. She had a maximum beam of 27 m (88 ft 7 in) and a draught of 6.7 m (22 ft 0 in). She displaced 10,000 long tons (10,000 t) at standard load, 11,500 t (11,300 long tons) at normal load and 12,134 t (11,942 long tons) at full load.

Because of the ship's high profile, there were concerns about her stability in bad weather as she had a significant amount of weight mounted high in the ship; notably her catapults, cranes and anti-aircraft guns. To increase her stability, two lateral tanks were fitted with a pressurized butterfly valve connecting them so that water could flow between the tanks to counter her rolling motion. On trials in 1933, the system was judged successful as it deadened the ship's roll by 37–65%. However, maintenance of the system proved to be problematic as the tanks were difficult to access.

=== Propulsion ===
Commandant Teste had a two-shaft unit machinery layout with alternating boiler and engine rooms. Her Schneider-Zoelly geared steam turbines were designed for 23,230 shp (17,320 kW). Four superheated Loire-Yarrow small-tube boilers powered the turbines at a pressure of 20 kg/cm^{2} (2,000 kPa; 280 psi) at a temperature of 290 °C (554 °F). These were the first superheated boilers in the Marine National and required some modifications after the ship's trials. The two in the forward boiler room were oil-fired, but the other two could use either fuel oil or coal. Commandant Teste had a designed speed of 21 knots (39 km/h; 24 mph), but she exceeded 22 knots (41 km/h; 25 mph) during sea trials on 23 July 1933. 1,163 t (1,145 long tons) of fuel oil was carried as well as 700 t (690 long tons) of coal. This provided a range of 2,000 nautical miles (3,700 km; 2,300 mi) at 18 knots (33 km/h; 21 mph) or 2,500 nmi (4,600 km; 2,900 mi) at 10 knots (19 km/h; 12 mph) using only coal. Two 300 kilowatt (kW) turbo generators provided electricity at 235 volts. Three 150 kW diesel generators were fitted to provide power while in harbor.

=== Armament ===
Commandant Teste was originally going to carry a mixture of 138.6 mm (5.5 in) or 155 mm (6.1 in) anti-surface and 75 mm (3.0 in) anti-aircraft (AA) guns, but this was changed before construction began to a homogeneous main battery of twelve Canon de 100 mm (3.9 in) Modèle 1927 45-caliber dual-purpose guns on powered single mounts. Five guns each were mounted on the fore and aft superstructures and two were mounted between the catapults. Their elevation limits were −10° to +85°. Their rate of fire was 10 rounds per minute. They had a maximum range of about 15,000 m (16,000 yd) with a 14.95 kg (33.0 lb) armor-piercing shell at a muzzle velocity of 755 m/s (2,480 ft/s). 280 rounds were provided for each gun, including 40 star shell rounds and 19 tracer rounds.

Eight 37 mm (1.5 in)/50 cal semi-automatic AA guns were carried by Commandant Teste. Two each were fitted on the fore and aft superstructures and four on platforms around the single funnel. 4,000 rounds were carried; 500 rounds per gun. The guns could depress 15° and elevate to 80°. They fired .725 kg (1.60 lb) shells at a muzzle velocity of 810 m/s (2,700 ft/s). Their effective anti-aircraft ceiling was less than 5,000 m (16,000 ft).

Six twin Hotchkiss Mitrailleuse de 13.2 mm (0.52 in) Modèle 1929 machine gun mounts were also fitted, two mounts were positioned on the bridge wings, two on the upper funnel platform, and two on the stern. The Hotchkiss guns had a cyclic rate of fire of 450 rounds per minute, but the practical rate was between 200 and 250 rounds per minute to allow for reloading its 30-round magazines. They had a theoretical ceiling of 4,200 m (13,800 ft).

Two fire-control directors were mounted to control the 100 mm guns; one above the bridge and the other atop the rear superstructure. Each director was fitted with a 3 m (9 ft 10 in) stereoscopic rangefinder. An upgrade to 5 m (16 ft 5 in) rangefinders was planned to improve the director's performance against surface targets, but was never carried out. The midships 37 mm anti-aircraft guns were controlled by a single 1 m (3 ft 3 in) rangefinder, but nothing was provided for the fore and aft 37 mm guns.

=== Protection ===
Commandant Teste had a waterline armor belt with a maximum thickness of 5 cm (2.0 in) abreast the machinery spaces and was 3.76 m (12.3 ft) high. The ship was protected from axial fire at the waterline by partial transverse bulkheads 2 cm (0.8 in) thick. The magazines were protected by 5 cm sides and 2 cm ends and roofs. The deck consisted of two layers of 1.2 cm (0.5 in) plating which increased to three layers above the boilers. 2.6 cm (1.0 in) of armor protected the steering gear. The sides of the conning tower were 8 cm (3.1 in) thick, but its roof was 3 cm (1.2 in) thick.

=== Aircraft arrangements ===
Commandant Teste had a very large hangar amidships that was three decks high and measured approximately 80 m × 26.5 m (262 ft 6 in × 86 ft 11 in). It was partitioned in two by a bulkhead that incorporated the exhaust uptakes for the funnel and the ventilation trunking for the machinery spaces. It could accommodate ten large torpedo bombers with folding wings; two smaller aircraft with folding wings could be stowed in lieu of each torpedo bomber. Two additional large aircraft and four smaller aircraft could be carried dismantled in crates in a hold below the hangar.

The aircraft were moved on a system of wheeled trolleys running on Décauville rails that extended throughout each half-hangar to the quarterdeck at the rear of the ship. The torpedo bombers would be moved to the quarterdeck where their wings would be extended and then they would be lowered into the water by the large crane at the very stern of the ship.

The hangar was surmounted by four Penhöet compressed-air catapults, each with a launch capacity of 2.5 t (2.5 long tons). The smaller fighter and reconnaissance seaplanes were lifted through large 15 m × 7 m (49 ft 3 in × 23 ft 0 in) hatches in the hangar roofs by one of the four cranes mounted at each corner of the hangar and mounted on the catapult. During trials in 1937, it took three hours to embark or disembark a group of 16 aircraft, 17 minutes to embark a single Gourdou-Leseurre GL-812 reconnaissance floatplane, and seven minutes to launch a section of four floatplanes by catapult.

== Aircraft ==
Commandant Teste was designed to accommodate the naval version of the Farman F.60 Goliath torpedo bomber, but they were obsolete when she was commissioned in 1932. Biplane Levasseur PL.14 torpedo bomber floatplanes were only briefly used as they proved to be too fragile for landing at sea. They were replaced by improved Levasseur PL.15 biplanes from July–August 1934. The Latécoère 298 monoplane replaced the PL.15 in March–May 1939. The scouting squadron was initially equipped with fixed-wing Gourdou-Leseurre GL-810 floatplanes until the folding wing Gourdou-Leseurre GL-811 arrived in October 1933. They were replaced in turn by the improved Gourdou-Leseurre GL-813 in early 1936. The larger Loire 130 flying boat replaced the GL-813 from April 1938, although the catapults had to be modified to handle their greater weight. No fighter seaplanes were ever embarked on Commandant Teste, although the Loire 210 floatplane was designed for the role. However, it proved to be greatly out-classed by contemporary land-based fighters and only 20 were built in 1939. It also proved to be a greatly deficient design; within three months of its service debut in August 1939, five had crashed due to structural failure of the wings and the remaining aircraft were grounded.

== Service history ==
Commandant Teste served with the Mediterranean Squadron upon commissioning in 1932. She was refitted between November 1935 and August 1936 when her 100 mm guns were given gun shields. From September 1937, she was based at Oran to protect neutral shipping from commerce raiders during the Spanish Civil War. In February 1938, she was refitted in Toulon to upgrade her catapults and then served as an aviation transport between France and her colonies in North Africa.

In August 1939, she embarked six Loire 130s and eight Latécoère 298s and sailed for Oran, where she was when World War II began the next month. Commandant Teste remained in North African waters until December 1939, when she returned to Toulon and landed her aircraft. She served as an aircraft transport between French North Africa and Metropolitan France for the first half of 1940. In late June 1940, she was transferred from the over-crowded anchorage at Oran to Mers El Kébir. She was lightly damaged by shell splinters during the British attack on Mers-el-Kébir on 3 July 1940, but suffered no casualties. She arrived at Toulon on 18 October where she was subsequently disarmed. In June 1941, Commandant Teste was reactivated as a gunnery training ship.

She was at Toulon when the Germans invaded Vichy France and was scuttled there on 27 November 1942 to avoid capture by the Germans. Refloated by the Italians on 1 May 1943, Commandant Teste was captured by the Germans in September 1943 and sunk again the following year by Allied bombs on 18–19 August 1944. Raised again in February 1945, she was still thought to be repairable and was considered for conversion as an escort or training carrier. The proposals were eventually dropped and the ship was used as a store ship for U.S.-built equipment until sold for scrap on 15 May 1950.
