= Former equipment of the Maavägi =

Equipment used by Estonian Army prior to WW II

This is an (incomplete) list of former equipments used by the Estonian Army (Maavägi:) prior to World War 2.

== Armour ==
Tanks

- 12 FT-17 light tank
- 4 Mark V heavy tank
- 6 TKS tankette

Armored cars

- 13 Arsenal Crossley armored car

Anti-tank weapons

- 44 Rheinmetall 37mm Pak 36 L/50 anti-tank gun (Note:The Estonian Rheinmetall gun had a longer barrel length compared to Wehrmacht standard L/45.)
- 4 Bohler 47 mm anti-tank gun model 1935
- 15 Solothurn-Arsenal 20 mm antitank gun
- TM-34; TM 37; anti-tank mines: ~12,000

== Artillery ==
Cannons

- 98 Russian 76 mm divisional gun M1902;
- 59 British 84mm Ordnance QF 18 pounder;
- 20 Russian [Schneider] 107 mm gun M1910;
- 23 British 110 mm QF 4.5 inch Howitzers;
- 8 German 15 cm sFH 13 howitzers;
- 29 Russian [Schneider] 152 mm howitzer M1910;

Anti Aircraft Guns

- 12 M38 Madsen 20 mm anti-aircraft cannon
- 16 37mm Rheinmetall-Borsig (Flak 18), 40mm (Bofors M36) anti-aircraft cannon
- 8 7.5 cm Krupp (Flak L/60) anti-aircraft cannon
- 116 tripod mounted anti-aircraft machineguns

Mortars

- 34 mortars: 81.4mm Brandt mle 27/31

== Infantry weapons ==
Pistols and rifles

- Pistols: Nagant M1895: 900, Browning FN Model 1903: ~4,600 (Replaced by ~5,300 Browning Hi-Power P35 in 1938)
- Rifles: Russian Mosin–Nagant M1891: 72,000, British Pattern 1914 Enfield: 46,000, Japanese Arisaka Types 30 and 38: 24,000

Submachine guns

- Tallinn Model 1923 Arsenal submachine gun: ~600, (Replaced by ~500 Suomi M/31 submachine guns in 1938)

Machine guns

- Russian Maxim PM M1910: ~1,600, British Lewis Gun: ~1,200, Danish Madsen machine gun M1920: ~1,700

Grenades

- Hand grenades: ~133,000

Electronics

- Field Radios: 133

== See also ==
- Military of Estonia
- Equipment of the Maavägi
