= Gourdou-Leseurre GL-820 HY =

1930s French floatplane

GL-820 HY

General information
- Type: Shipborne reconnaissance / torpedo floatplane
- National origin: France
- Manufacturer: Gourdou-Leseurre
- Number built: 1x GL-820 HY; 1 x GL-821 HY 1 x GL-821 HY 02

History
- First flight: GL-820 HY 10 May 1935; GL-821 HY 28 January 1936 GL-821 HY 02 5 October 1937

The Gourdou-Leseurre GL-820 HY family of four-seat single-engined floatplanes were designed and built in France during the latter half of the 1930s by Gourdou-Leseurre. The GL-820 HY and GL-821 HY 02 were shipborne reconnaissance / observation aircraft, while the sole GL-821 HY was built as a torpedo carrier.

== Design and development ==
The Gl-820 and GL-821 were low-wing monoplane floatplanes with four tandem open cockpits, (the Cockpits on the GL-821 HY 02 were enclosed). The wings, tailplanes and floats were all supported by a system of streamlined struts.

== Variants ==
GL-820 HY
The initial reconnaissance aircraft prototype, powered by a 730 hp (540 kW) Hispano-Suiza 9Vb driving a two-bladed fixed-pitch wooden propeller.
GL-821 HY
The second aircraft built as a torpedo carrier, powered by a 750 hp (560 kW) Gnome & Rhône 9Kfr.
GL-821 HY 02
The third aircraft, powered by a 750 hp (560 kW) Gnome & Rhône 9Kfr driving a three-bladed metal propeller.

== Specifications (GL-821 HY) ==
Data from Aviafrance : Gourdou Leseurre GL-821 HY, Gourdou Leseurre GL-821 HY 02, Gourdou Leseurre GL-820 HY

General characteristics

- Crew: 4
- Length: 11 m (36 ft 1 in)
- Wingspan: 16 m (52 ft 6 in)
- Height: 5.2 m (17 ft 1 in)
- Wing area: 44 m^{2} (470 sq ft)
- Empty weight: 1,950 kg (4,299 lb)
- Gross weight: 3,200 kg (7,055 lb)
- Powerplant: 1 × Gnome & Rhône 9Kfr 9-cylinder air-cooled radial piston engine, 560 kW (750 hp)

GL-820 HY: 1 x 730 hp (540 kW) Hispano-Suiza 9Vb 9-cylinder radial

Performance

- Maximum speed: 220 km/h (140 mph, 120 kn)

Gl-820 HY: 215 km/h (134 mph; 116 kn)
Gl-821 HY 02: 235 km/h (146 mph; 127 kn)

- Range: 1,000 km (620 mi, 540 nmi)
- Service ceiling: 7,000 m (23,000 ft)

Armament

- Guns: 1 × fixed forward firing 7.5 mm (0.295 in) Darne machine gun in the starboard wing; 2x 7.75 mm (0.305 in) Lewis guns on a flexible mount in the rearmost cockpit
- Bombs: 300 kg (660 lb) of bombs (GL-820 HY and GL-821 HY 02) or one torpedo (GL-821 HY)
