= Gourdou-Leseurre GL.2 =

French fighter

Type B, GL.2
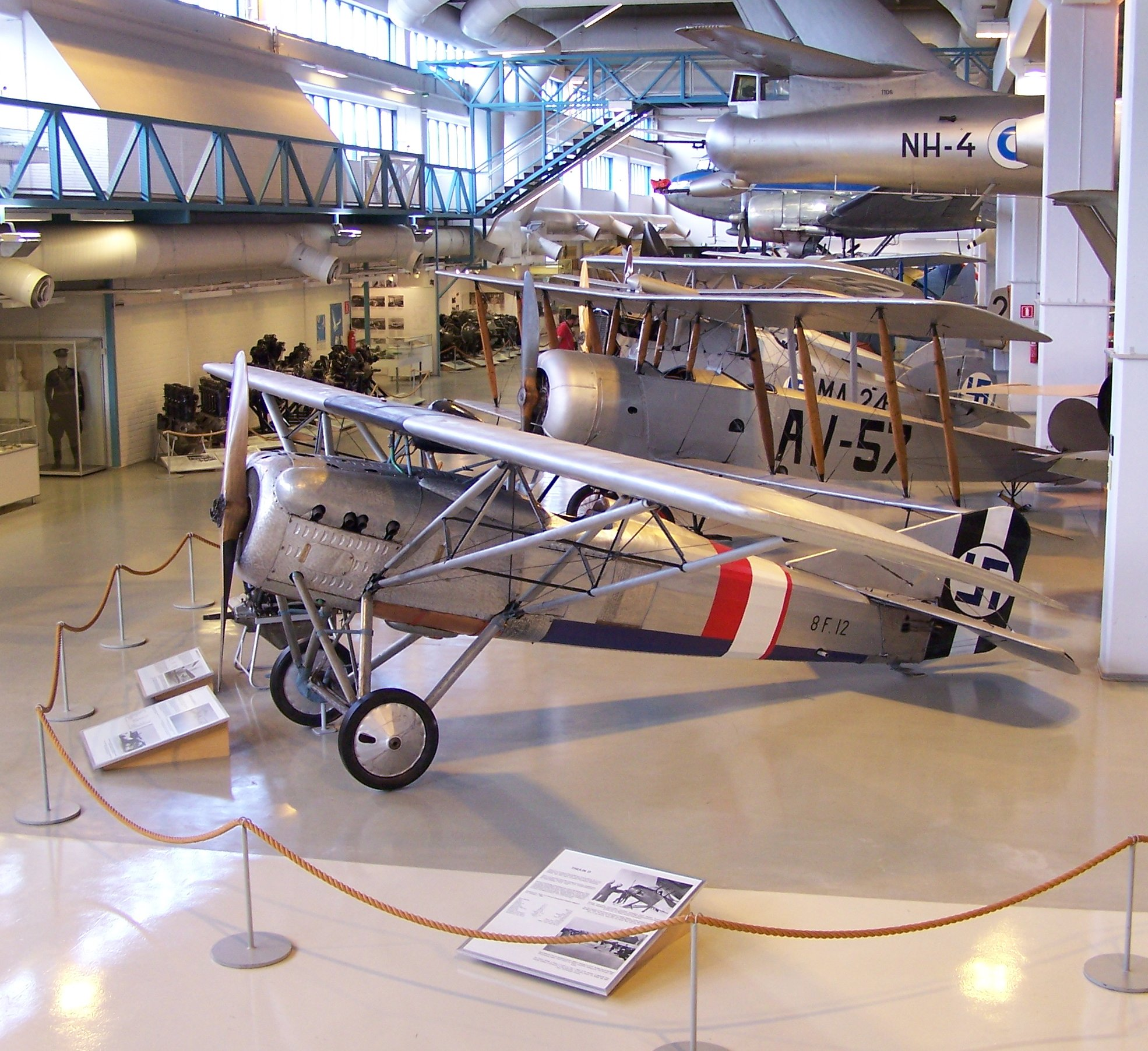
- Gourdou-Leseurre GL.22 at the Aviation Museum of Central Finland.

General information
- Type: Fighter
- Manufacturer: Gourdou-Leseurre
- Primary users: French Air Force and Navy Finnish Air Force, Czechoslovak Air Force, Estonian Air Force

History
- First flight: 1918

The Gourdou-Leseurre GL.2 (originally, the Gourdou-Leseurre Type B) was a French fighter aircraft which made its maiden flight in 1918.

== Design and development ==
The GL.2 was a development of the Gourdou-Leseurre Type A which had shown pleasing performance during testing but which had been ultimately rejected by the Aéronautique Militaire due to concerns about the rigidity of the wing. The Type B featured not only a new wing design, now braced by four struts on either side in place of the two per side on the Type A, but also a revised fin and rudder for improved directional stability, and strengthened undercarriage. Twenty examples were delivered in November 1918, designated GL.2C.1 in service, but the end of the war meant a loss of official interest.

Gourdou-Leseurre continued development anyway, and by 1920 had an improved version, designated GL.21 or B2 ready for exhibition at the Paris Salon de l'Aéronautique that year. This differed from the GL.2 mostly in having revised ailerons and a batch of twenty were purchased by the Aéronautique Militaire, with another one being purchased by Finland for evaluation.

Two years later, a further revision of the design appeared as the GL.22 or B3. This featured a redesigned wing of greater span, and modified horizontal stabiliser and landing gear. This proved to be a moderate success for Gourdou-Leseurre, selling 20 to the Aéronautique Maritime as the GL.22C.1, as well as 18 to Finland, 15 to Czechoslovakia, 15 to Estonia, one to Latvia, and Yugoslavia. This was followed by a small series of test aircraft designated GL.23 or B4 before manufacture of the GL.22 resumed in an unarmed version known internally to the company as the B5 and purchased by both the Aéronautique Militaire and Aéronautique Maritime as the GL.22ET.1 for use as an advanced trainer (Ecole de Transition). One of these aircraft was used for trials aboard the aircraft carrier Béarn.

The GL.24 version was produced in small numbers in 1925 for various trial purposes, including one two-seat trainer conversion, and one air ambulance (TS – Transport Sanitaire) exhibited at an international medical conference held in Paris that year.

The GL.2 was also used as a display aircraft, with Gourdou-Leseurre test pilot André Christiany flying one to win the speed trial in the 1923 Coupe Michelin, and two ET.1s painted in the tricolore giving displays throughout France and North Africa the same year. Even well into the 1930s, specialised aerobatic versions were produced as the B6 and B7 for Jérôme Cavalli and Fernand Malinvaud respectively, with a second B7 built for Adrienne Bolland.

== Variants ==
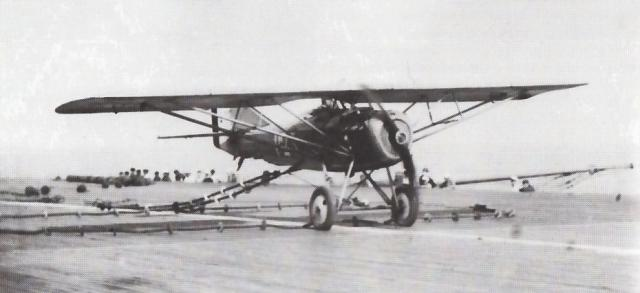
Deck landing of a Gourdou-Leseurre GL 22

- B/GL.2 – Initial wartime version (20 built)
- B2/GL.21 – G.2 with revised ailerons (21 built). Also known as the GL.21C.1.
- B3/GL.22 – New wing, tail, landing gear (71 built). Also known as the GL.22C.1.
- B4/GL.23 – Test versions (9 built). Also known as the GL.23C.1.
  - GL.23TS – Air ambulance version (1 built)
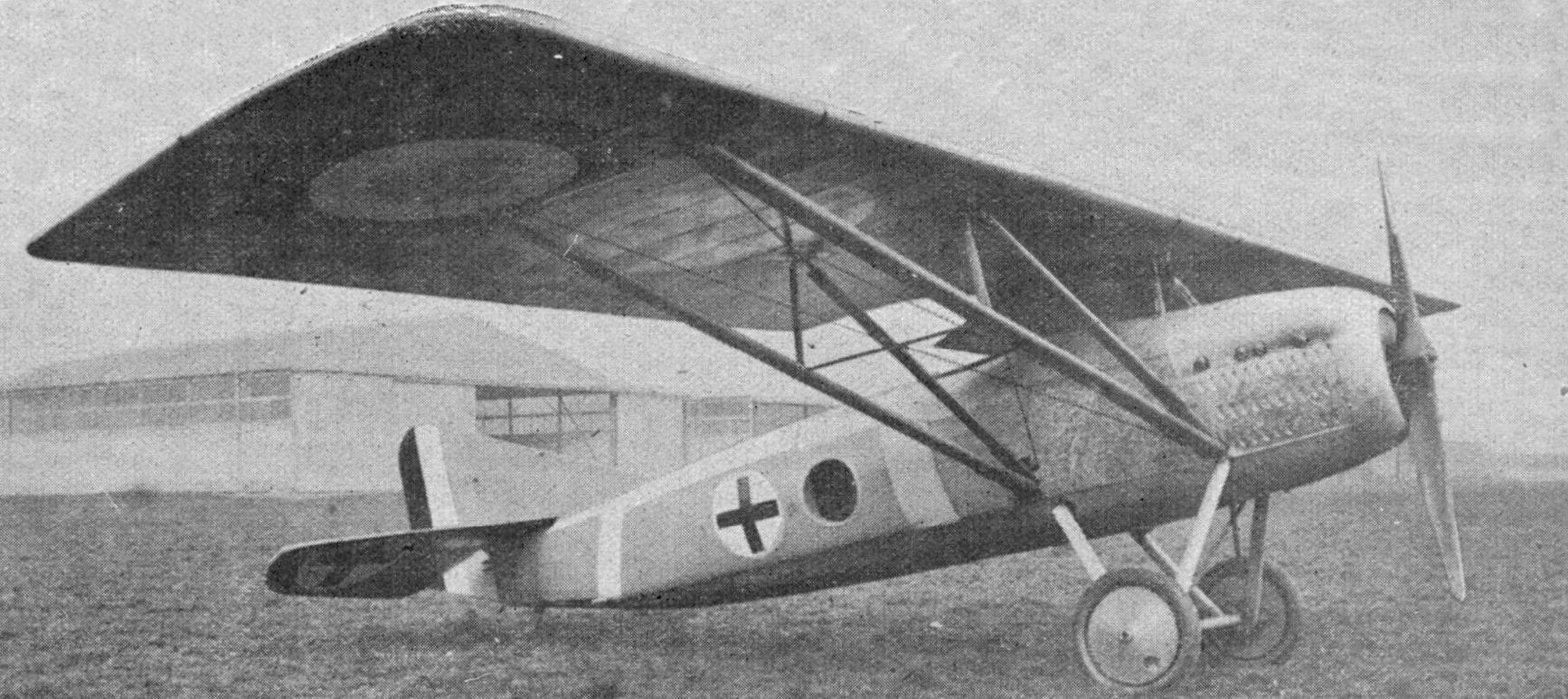
    Gourdou-Leseurre LGL.23 TS photo from L'Aéronautique December,1926
- B5/GL.22ET – Unarmed version of B3. Also known as the ET.
- GL.24 – Test versions
  - GL.24X – Test aircraft to investigate the effects of overloading (1 built)
- B6 – Aerobatic version for Jérôme Cavalli with Hispano-Suiza 9Qd engine (1 built)
- B7 – Aerobatic version for Fernand Malinvaud and Adrienne Bolland with Lorraine 9Na engine (2 built)

== Operators ==
Czechoslovakia

- Czechoslovak Air Force – 15 × GL.22

Estonia

- Estonian Air Force – 15 × GL.22

Finland

- Finnish Air Force – 1 × GL.21, 18 × GL.22, plus one extra built from spare parts

France

- Aéronautique Militaire
- Aéronautique Maritime

Latvia

- Latvian Air Force
- Aizsargi – 1 × GL.22

Kingdom of Yugoslavia

- Yugoslav Royal Air Force – 20 GL.22 bought from France during 1928. Obtained licence for another 20 built by Zmaj during 1929/30, and another 6 built by Zmaj in 1933.

== Specifications (GL.22C.1) ==
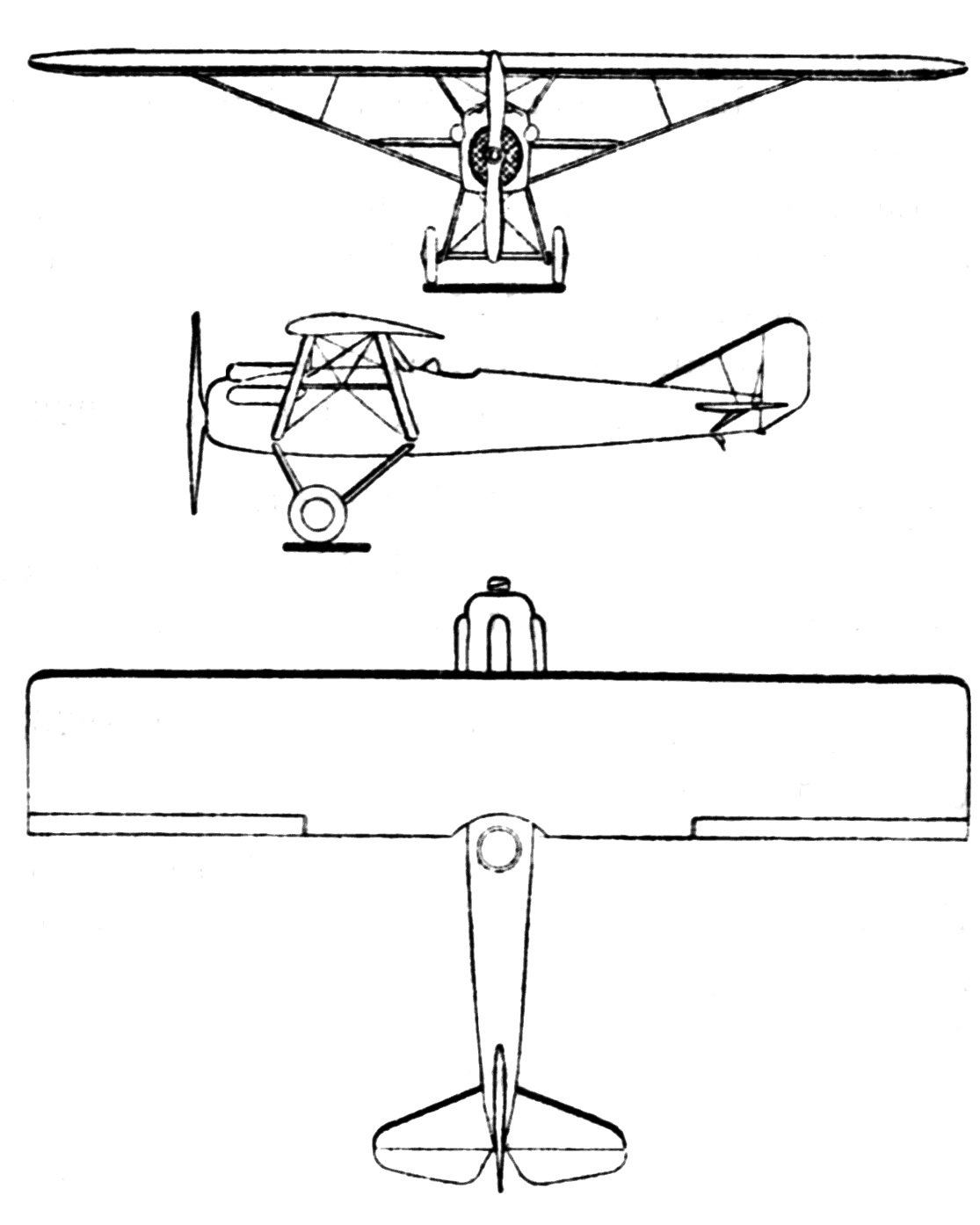
Gourdou-Leseurre GL.23 3-view drawing from Le Document aéronautique April,1926

General characteristics

- Crew: One pilot
- Length: 6.50 m (21 ft 4 in)
- Wingspan: 9.40 m (30 ft 10 in)
- Height: 2.52 m (8 ft 4 in)
- Wing area: 18.4 m^{2} (198 sq ft)
- Empty weight: 590 kg (1,800 lb)
- Gross weight: 880 kg (1,940 lb)
- Powerplant: 1 × Hispano-Suiza 8Ab , 134 kW (180 hp)

Performance

- Maximum speed: 257 km/h (153 mph, 133 kn)
- Range: 450 km (280 mi, 240 nmi)
- Service ceiling: 7,500 m (24,600 ft)
- Rate of climb: 4.8 m/s (940 ft/min)

Armament

- 2 × fixed, forward-firing .303 Vickers machine guns

== See also ==
Related lists

- List of fighter aircraft
- List of interwar military aircraft
- List of military aircraft of Finland
- List of military aircraft of France

== Bibliography ==
- Cortet, Pierre (January 1995). "Les premiers chasseurs Goudou-Leseurre (1^{ère} partie)" [The First Gourdou-Leseurre Fighters]. Avions: Toute l'aéronautique et son histoire (in French) (23): 35–37. ISSN 1243-8650.
- Gerdessen, Frederik. "Estonian Air Power 1918 – 1945". Air Enthusiast, No. 18, April – July 1982. pp. 61–76. ISSN 0143-5450.
- Hirschauer, Louis; Dollfus, Charles, eds. (1921). L'Année Aéronautique: 1920-1921. Paris: Dunod. p. 11.
- Janić, Čedomir; O. Petrović (2011). Short History of Aviation in Serbia. Beograd: Aerokomunikacije. ISBN 978-86-913973-2-6.
