= LMT R-20 Rahe =

5.56mm assault rifle

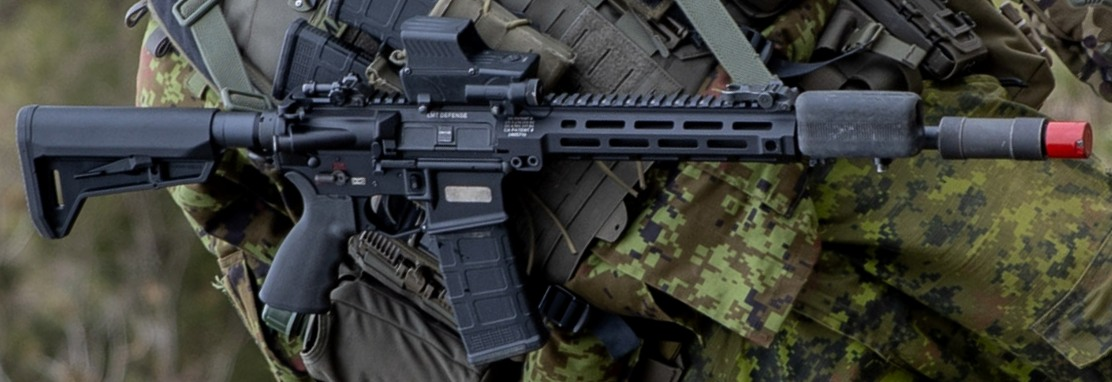
- The R-20 slung on an Estonian soldier's shoulder.
- Type: Assault rifle Designated marksman rifle (R-20 L)
- Place of origin: United States/Estonia

Service history
- In service: 2020–present
- Wars: Mali War

Production history
- Designer: Lewis Machine & Tool Company
- Manufacturer: Lewis Machine & Tool Company
- Produced: 2019–present
- No. built: 19,000
- Variants: See Variants

Specifications
- Mass: 3.15 kg (6.94 lb); 3.32 kg (7.32 lb); 4.25 kg (9.37 lb)
- Length: 814 mm (32.0 in) stock extended/ 732 mm (28.8 in) stock folded; 891 mm (35.1 in) stock extended/ 808 mm (31.8 in) stock folded; 984 mm (38.7 in) stock extended/ 902 mm (35.5 in) stock folded
- Barrel length: 310 mm (12.2 in); 362.22 mm (14.3 in); 411 mm (16.2 in)
- Cartridge: 5.56×45mm NATO; 7.62×51mm NATO
- Action: Gas-operated, rotating bolt (internal piston, not direct impingement) or Short-stroke piston
- Rate of fire: 700 rounds/min
- Muzzle velocity: 850 m/s (2,789 ft/s); 900 m/s (2,953 ft/s); 750 m/s (2,461 ft/s)
- Effective firing range: 500 metres (550 yd)
- Feed system: 5.56×45mm NATO: 30-round detachable box magazine 7.62×51mm NATO: 20-round detachable box magazine

The LMT R-20 Rahe ("Hail" in Estonian) is an assault rifle chambered for the 5.56×45mm NATO cartridge. It is specially designed and manufactured for the needs of the Estonian Defense Forces (EDF) by Lewis Machine & Tool Company (LMT).

The R-20 Rahe replaced the IMI Galil and Automatkarbin 4 rifles in the EDF, the latter rifles being stored for reserve use.

== History ==
Plans were made from 2016 to replace the IMI Galil and the Ak 4 in Estonian service. Among the rifles that competed included the HK416, the SIG Sauer 716 and the LMT MARS. The LMT R-20 Rahe is based on LMT MARS, and is known by the manufacturer Lewis Machine Tools (LMT) as the LMT Modular Ambidextrous Rifle System (MARS) - Light (MARS-L). The New Zealand Army uses the rifle also.

Representatives from LMT and the Defense Investment Center signed an agreement on July 2, 2019 to allow Estonia to purchase the new rifles under a €75 million contract. The total order was 18,340 rifles.

The EDF awarded the contract to LMT for the Rahe with initial deliveries made by 2019 for the assault rifles and accessories. Deliveries were scheduled to be done by 2021 with an option from the company for future modernisation over the next 20 years. In actuality deliveries begun in 2020 and most Rahes were delivered in 2022.

The Rahes were fully delivered by 2023. Milrem LCM and Visible Assets was chosen by LMT to serve as their Estonian partner to help with logistical support. The R-20 Ls were used to replace M14 TP2s that were sent to Ukraine as military assistance.

In September 2025, it was reported in the news that all of the Rahe R-20 Ls needed to be sent back to manufacturer for warranty repairs. LMT covered the expenses for repairing the R-20 Ls and replacing defective gas blocks.

=== Combat Use ===
The new Rahe rifles have been used in Mali and Iraq by the Estonian Defence Forces.

== Design ==
The standard barrel length of the R-20 is 14.3 in (363 mm), but a 12 in (305 mm) variant designated the R-20 S is also produced. The rifles allow for the change of barrels.

A modified trigger design allows the trigger safety to be engaged without the hammer being cocked, which is not possible on a standard AR-15 pattern rifle.

The rifles were ordered with a Shot Counter Grip Module housed within the pistol grip to track parts wear and ammunition consumption with objective digital data. The accompanying reader unit can provide armorers with diagnostic maintenance warnings. As the name suggest, the Shot Counter Grip Module counts the number of rounds fired by the gun.

== Variants ==
=== Rahe R-20 S ===
The Rahe R-20 S, the S referring to Short, is a shortened version of Rahe R-20 5.56×45mm NATO series with the barrel length 310 millimeters. The Rahe Short is designed for urban battles and trenches as well as use by headquarters troops.

=== Rahe R-20 ===
The Rahe R-20 is the 5.56×45mm NATO assault rifle and the most common version of the R-20 series used by the Estonian Defence Forces and Estonian Defence League. It is the standard issue assault rifle of Estonian Defence Forces.

=== Rahe R-20 L ===
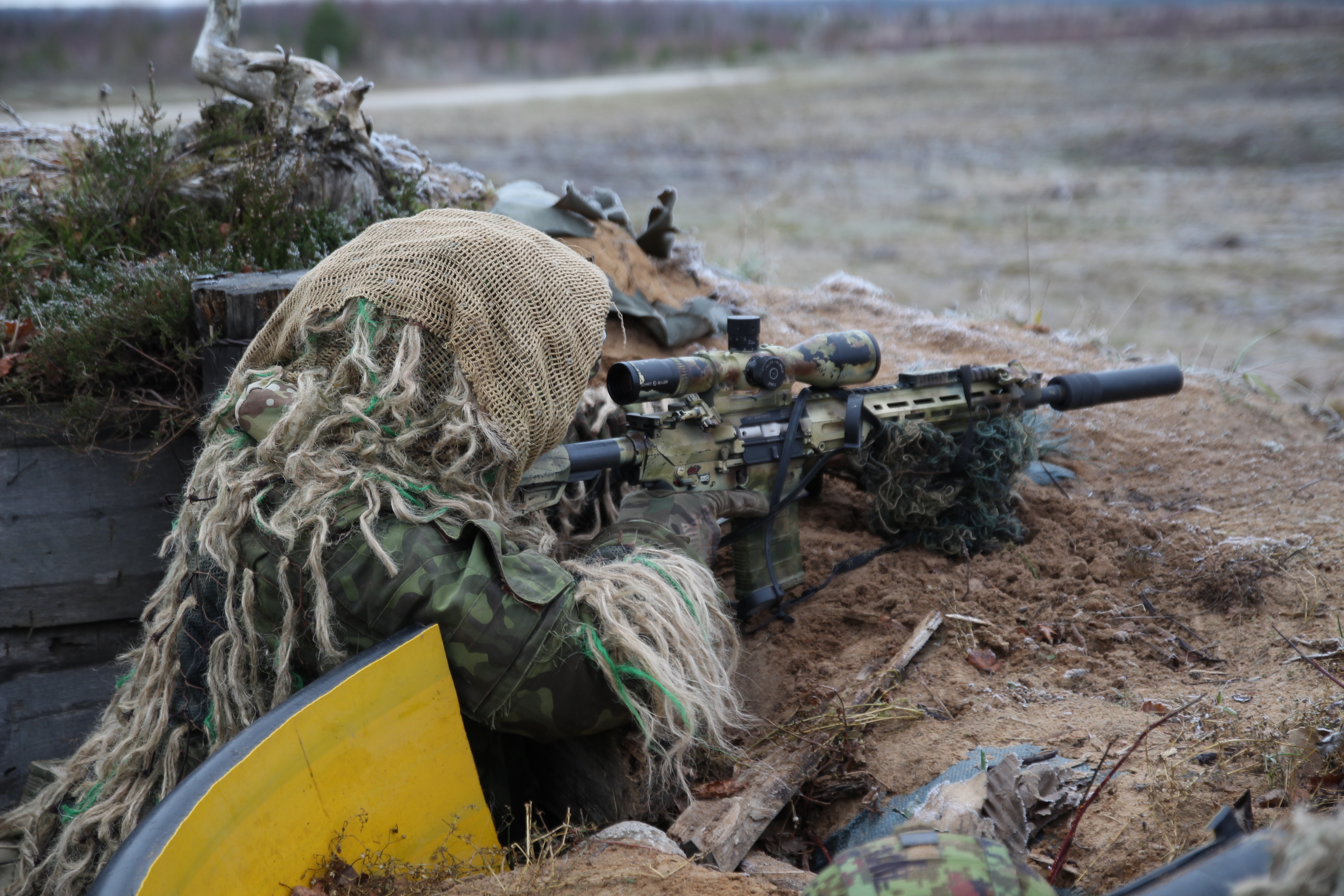
The long 7.62×51mm version of R-20

The Rahe R-20 L, the L referring to Long is a 7.62×51mm NATO precision rifle, based on the MARS-H. Rahe R-20 L uses a 20-round detachable box magazine. It is also possible to mount telescopic sight and bayonet onto it.

=== Estonia R20 RAHE Reference Rifle ===
For civilian customers, LMT offers the semi-automatic-only R-20 RAHE Reference Rifle in its model range.

== Users ==
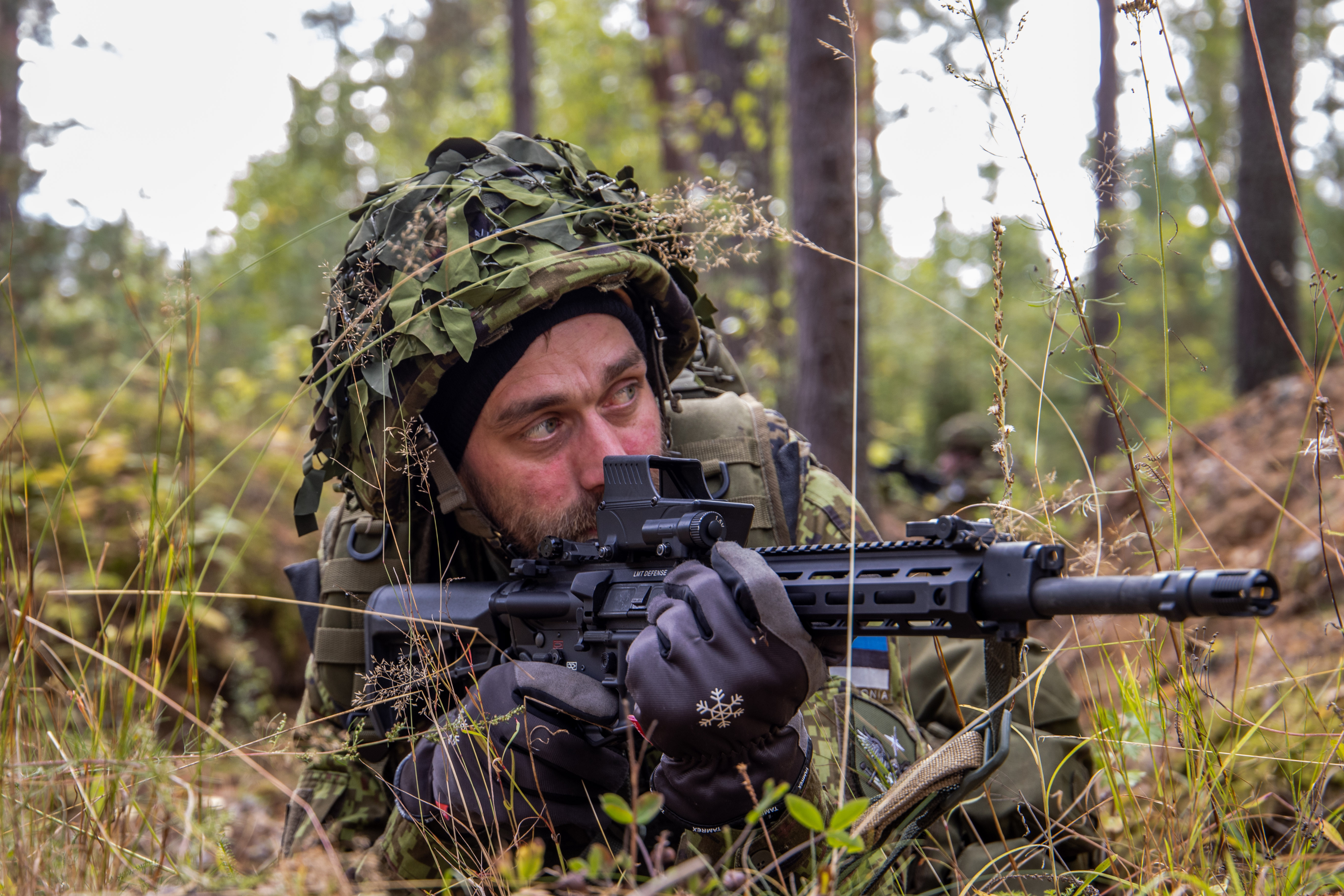
Estonian Defence League soldier with Rahe R20

- Estonia: Used as a standard rifle in the Estonian Defence Forces and Estonian Defence League.
