= Estonian Special Operations Force =

Estonian military unit

- Erioperatsioonide väejuhatus
- Insignia of Estonian Special Operations Force
- Active: 1 August 2014–present
- Country: Estonia
- Type: Special forces
- Role: Unconventional warfare Special reconnaissance Military support Direct action
- Part of: Estonian Defence Forces
- Garrison/HQ: Juhkentali 58, 15007, Tallinn
- Anniversaries: 8 May
- Engagements: War in Afghanistan; Mali War
- Website: Erioperatsioonide väejuhatus

Commanders
- Current commander: Colonel Rivo Meimer

Insignia
- ESTSOF's flag

The Estonian Special Operations Force (Estonian: Erioperatsioonide väejuhatus; ESTSOF) is the command charged with overseeing the special operations units of the Estonian Defence Forces. Its primary objective is the development of capabilities for unconventional warfare. It is tasked with planning, preparing and executing special operations. These include special reconnaissance and surveillance, military support (Note: Training and/or leading guerrilla and military units of other countries in combat.) and direct action. ESTSOF is under direct command of the Commander of the Estonian Defence Forces.

The Special Operations Task Group (Estonian: Erioperatsioonide grupp) is a special forces unit within the Estonian Special Operations Force.

== History ==
=== Preceding units (1993-2007) ===
Part of the roots of Estonian special operations forces could be traced to the long-range reconnaissance and diversion unit that was created in 1993 as part of a military intelligence department in the Estonian Defence Forces. The unit was originally modeled after Soviet spetsnaz groups. However, the attempt to form this new unit was unsuccessful and never properly materialised. In 1998, when the Military Intelligence Battalion was created, another attempt was made, but this too failed.

A parallel attempt to create a special operations force was made within the Estonian Defence League in 1994. The new unit was named Special Operations Group (SOG). Andrei Ambros became the units commander. In 1998, SOG was transferred to the Guard Battalion but remained under the direct command of the Commander of the Estonian Defence Forces. In 1999, a member of SOG attempted an armed robbery using the unit's weapons, which led to the disbanding of the unit. Two previous robbery incidents were also blamed on the SOG.

In 2002, under the structure of the Military Intelligence Battalion, the effort to create a special operations force was restarted. A reconnaissance team, formed from specially trained operators and named ESTHUMINT, was sent to Afghanistan in 2005. However, the mission was cut short in 2007 due to issues with intelligence sharing.

=== Formation (2008-2014) ===
The official creation date of Special Operations Task Group (SOTG) is May 8, 2008. On that day a directive, ordering the creation of the unit, was signed by the Commander of the Estonian Defence Forces at the time - Ants Laaneots. Recruitment was initially very difficult because the unit was largely unknown and not understood at the time. There were also cases when other unit commanders forbade participation in the selection because they didn't want to lose good soldiers. However, this was later solved with a decree which permitted all soldiers to participate of their own free will. Attitudes towards the selection gradually changed and passing it became a thing of pride. The unit found a lot of support from the NATO Special Operations Headquarters, part of SHAPE, which sent the NATO Special Operations Coordination Centre (NSCC) to evaluate it. At the same time the unit was allowed to participate in courses organized by the NSCC. Because the unit initially lacked competence to train NATO compliant special forces, the decision was made to send soldiers to train in courses in Hungary. In 2009, the unit also started receiving support from US led Special Operations Command Europe (SOCEUR), which was critical for the development of SOTG. By 2010, the unit had developed enough to organize a special forces qualification course in Estonia. The unit received its flag on October 2, 2012. On January 1, 2013, SOTG was split from the Military Intelligence Battalion and placed under the direct command of the Commander of the Estonian Defence Forces.

Estonian Special Operations Force was officially created on August 1, 2014. At the same time the Special Operations Task Group became its subordinate unit. The two main areas that ESTSOF has focused on from the beginning are unconventional warfare and military support - acting as a force multiplier in low intensity conflicts and supporting allies. ESTSOF operators have provided support in Afghanistan, Ukraine, Georgia and Senegal.

=== War in Afghanistan (2012-2014) ===
At the end of 2012, ESTSOF started a mission in Afghanistan with ISAF. Preparations involved determining the logistics, communications, reconnaissance and other aspects of the mission. A large part of the preparations focused on learning and analysing the local geography, climate, social and economic situation, but also the strength, structure, activity and area of operations of the insurgents and allies. After the arrival and first survey in the area, it was clear that the situation was as difficult as thought. One of the main roads going through the province was among the top ranked in terms of number of exploded IEDs. Local units were mostly preoccupied with defending their own bases and insurgents had completely free rein right outside one of the central cities in the province. Rocket attacks on bases were extremely common. The Afghan National Army had to deliver supplies to their positions with civilian vehicles because military vehicles couldn't pass. On the other hand, the police special unit in the area was well managed and equipped. The initial goal of ESTSOF was to provide military aid to said unit and conduct operations with them. It soon became clear that this was not enough to stabilize the situation.

A few weeks after the arrival of the Estonian Special Operations Task Unit (SOTU), the Provincial Chief of Police changed. While conducting his first patrol he came under ambush just a few kilometers from his headquarters. He was forced to take cover under a nearby bridge and couldn't break out of the firefight. The SOTU was notified of the situation by the police special forces. The Estonian unit decided to take physical action and managed to solve the situation without any allied casualties.

After months of planning and difficult persuasion of the various security forces, the SOTU had reached the goal of conducting the first joint operations. The army was made responsible for clearing the roads and guarding the outside perimeter, while the police was tasked with guarding the inside perimeter, conducting searches, interrogations and arrests. The criminal police, security services and special reconnaissance units were tasked with providing intelligence on the activities of the insurgents. The police special force was usually the focal point of the operations. In addition, the operations were supported by the activities of the prosecution, courts and the media. This proved to be successful and soon such operations, sometimes involving over 1000 members, became regular.

Another big challenge was the situation with IEDs. Checking and clearing the roads was slow and stressful, and if there was nobody left to guard them, in a matter of hours they had to be considered unsafe. Because of that, the local army and police established checkpoints on the roads. To man those checkpoints, they started training local people and incorporated them into the Afghan Local Police. Every checkpoint had 10-20 policemen and were placed no further than 10 km from each other.

By the end of the service of the first SOTU, the situation had changed drastically. Local forces were continuously working at checkpoints and conducting joint operations. The police special forces were independently planning and conducting relatively complex operations. Movement on roads became safer and much quicker. Rocket attacks against bases became rare. This had even forced Taliban to change local leaders. In the end it provided ESTSOF with more time to focus on developing the police special forces and improving their joint operations capabilities.

In 2013, a second SOTU was sent to Afghanistan to replace the first unit. Preparations for the rotation began several months before the first contingent had even entered the country. A lot of time was dedicated to polishing the necessary skills and knowledge, and learning the environment. Gaps in the preparation were filled on location with the help of the first SOTU and during planning of operations. Taking over the mission was a lot easier due to the groundwork laid by the first contingent.

The second SOTU continued advising the local forces. In addition, gradual steps were made to start arresting key Taliban personnel. Training of police special forces started involving high risk arrests, air transportation and night operations. To ensure operational safety and prevent leaks, planning was done within a limited circle of members and revealed to subordinates just before its execution. Operations were conducted in sequence of gradually increasing difficulty to accustom the units. This, combined with previous successful steps, eventually forced Taliban to move into more distant regions.

=== Insurgency in Mali (2020-2022) ===
In March 2020, it was announced that Estonian special forces would join Takuba Task Force in Mali. They would work alongside French special forces in supporting Malian security forces. The Estonian task group would also employ four Jackal armored vehicles, which were loaned from the UK for the mission. In July, the Estonian task group started its mission in Gao, where troops from the Estonian Defence Forces, which were participating in Operation Barkhane, were already based. The mission ended in July 2022 due to diplomatic tensions with Mali's ruling junta.

== Structure ==
The Estonian Special Operations Force consists of a headquarters and the Special Operations Task Group. Information regarding the organisation of other units under ESTSOF is classified. ESTSOF is led by the Commander of ESTSOF, whose tasks are determined by the Estonian Defence Forces Organisation Act and the Estonian Defence Forces Statute. The headquarters is tasked with advising and supporting the Commander of ESTSOF, in addition to planning, arranging and assuring the activities of ESTSOF. The SOTG is tasked with planning, preparing and organising special operations. It consists of sections and squads.

== Personnel ==
=== Selection ===
Official recruitment to SOTG began in 2005. In early phases of the project, at least a three-year service experience was required from candidates. That requirement was later dropped. Current requirements for the candidate are as follows: at least general secondary education, completed conscript service, passing a general fitness test (at least 62 push-ups in two minutes, 72 sit-ups in two minutes, 3,2 km run under 13:49), a valid decision from the medical committee of the Defence Forces, high proficiency in Estonian and basic proficiency in English. Potential candidates with a criminal record or an addiction aren't allowed to apply for a spot in SOTG. In 2019, it was announced that ESTSOF would also begin recruiting and training conscripts to create reserve forces.

The selection consists of four phases. First phase is called the administrative phase and lasts two days. The administrative phase tests include a general fitness test, pull-ups, swimming (500 metres on water, 25 metres underwater, ABC test - which involves diving to a depth of 4,5 metres, putting on a diving mask and swimfins and swimming to the surface), English test, psychological test, interview and an essay. The second phase is called the individual phase and it lasts four days. During that phase, the candidates have to perform many physically and mentally difficult tasks, which test their resilience. The third phase is called the orienteering phase, which lasts four days. This phase requires the candidates to complete different orienteering challenges with a 1:50,000 map and a compass. The candidates have to orienteer during day and night with a full backpack. The final phase is called the team phase and it lasts four days. This phase tests the candidates capability to lead and act as part of a team. Around 80-85% of the participants fail the selection. However, getting through the four phases of the selection does not guarantee acceptance into SOTG either. Each qualified person will also be individually analysed and evaluated and an invitation to the unit will be made after they have been found suitable.

=== Training ===
The initial training of the special forces operator will take about 3 years. The first year will be spent improving the soldiers personal skills, going through NCO training and ESTSOF basic training. The second year involves passing qualification courses and learning special skills. The third year is spent in team training and cross training, which is normally capped off with a mission. This is followed by 2–3 years of supplemental training. After that, the operator, together with his team, will specialise in a certain set of tasks. In total, it takes about 8 years to prepare a special forces operator.

== Equipment ==
Model	Image	Origin	Type	Caliber	Notes
Glock 19		Austria	Semi-automatic pistol	9×19mm Parabellum	
Heckler & Koch MP7		Germany	Personal defense weapon	4.6×30mm	
Heckler & Koch HK416		Germany	Assault rifle	5.56×45mm NATO	
Heckler & Koch HK417		Germany	Battle rifle	7.62×51mm NATO	
Heckler & Koch MG4		Germany	Light machine gun	5.56×45mm NATO	

== See also ==
- Latvian Special Tasks Unit
- Lithuanian Special Operations Force
- Utti Jaeger Regiment
