= Aviotehas PN-3 =

Estonian fighter prototype

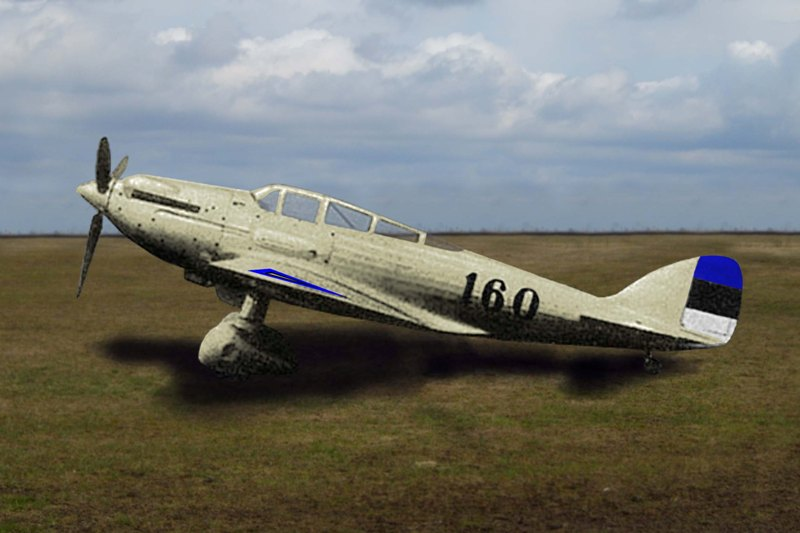

General information
- Type: Fighter
- National origin: Estonia
- Manufacturer: Aviotehas
- Designer: V. Post & R. Neudorf
- Number built: 1

History
- First flight: January 1939

The Aviotehas PN-3 Isamaa Päästja - (Savior of the Fatherland in Estonian), was an Estonian fighter and surveillance reconnaissance aircraft used by the Estonian Air Force at the end of the 1930s. It was first introduced in 1939 and was in service until Estonia was occupied by the Soviet Union in 1940.

== Background ==
In 1936, the Estonian government took action to raise funds for the replacement of its air force equipment. This was done by taking advantage of the Spanish Civil War, where the republican government, trying to get aircraft for its pilots as quickly as possible, willingly paid exorbitant prices for outdated planes. Eight Bulldog fighters and Potez 25 multirole planes were sold to the Spanish. In addition, Estonia acted as a transit country for the delivery of Letov Š.231, Aero A.101 and Avia 51 Czechoslovak planes to the Republic of Spain, and served as a cover for the Spanish order of Fokker aircraft. Although the sale of the aircraft in service temporarily weakened Estonia's military aviation capability, it provided funds for rapid modernisation.

In 1937, a two-man delegation was sent to western and central Europe in search of the best and most modern types of aircraft. Fokker offered the D. XXI, whose production began in Finland, and the heavy two-seat G.I., which didn't see major production in Estonia. In July 1937, Estonian representatives signed a provisional order for 12 Spitfire fighters, but the deal was blocked by the British Air Ministry. Various other deals were sought through, however the Estonian Air Forces had its own views on the modernisation of their fleet. They believed it was necessary to train pilots to the level required to fly modern aircraft, and therefore formed a new design group, whose purpose was to design their own, now Estonian-made, aircraft.

== Design ==
Designed by V. Post & R. Neudorf of the Estonian Aero Club (Eesti Aeroklubi), the PN-3 was produced by Aviotehas in 1939, featuring a 425 kW (570 hp) Rolls-Royce Kestrel XI engine that allowed a top speed of 395 km/h (245 mph; 213 kn). The series was planned with retractable landing gear, but the prototype was built with fixed landing gear for economy and to speed up development. The PN-3 was of mixed design. The fuselage frame was a truss welded from steel pipes. The front part was covered with removable aluminum panels, while the back was covered with canvas. The wing of the aircraft was solid wood. The main landing gear did not retract and were covered with fairings. The power plant consisted of a twelve-cylinder Rolls-Royce Kestrel XI liquid-cooled V-engine that developed 570 hp. (419 kW) and rotating a three-bladed variable pitch propeller. The armament was supposed to consist of two 7.62 mm (0.300 in) synchronous machine guns (one on each side of the fuselage) and one mobile machine gun in the observer's cockpit, but the prototype was not armed. The start of World War II and Soviet occupation of Estonia interrupted the PN-3 program, and it never reached mass production.

The PN-3 prototype was built by the summer of 1939. It was flown on its maiden voyage by pilot Peter Olf, who successfully completed a series of test flights. The Air Force was satisfied with the new machine but had no time to put it into series production. In the summer of 1940, the Baltic States became part of the USSR and most of the planes that reached the Red Army Air Forces were scrapped as outdated.

== Service history ==
The PN-3 was primarily used for reconnaissance missions, but it was also used for training and light transport duties. The plane had a crew of two, a pilot and an observer, who operated the camera equipment. The camera was mounted in the fuselage and could be aimed through a window on the floor of the aircraft. Just one prototype was finished and delivered to the Estonian Air Force, later being used as a trainer. After Estonia was occupied by the USSR in 1940, the single prototype was used for target practice.

== Specifications (PN-3) ==
Data from Post & Neudorf (Aviotehase) PN-3

General characteristics

- Crew: 2
- Length: 9 m (29 ft 6 in)
- Wingspan: 10.65 m (34 ft 11 in)
- Height: 3.2 m (10 ft 6 in)
- Powerplant: 1 × Rolls-Royce Kestrel XI V-12 liquid-cooled piston engine, 430 kW (570 hp)
- Propellers: 3-bladed variable-pitch propeller

Performance

- Maximum speed: 395 km/h (245 mph, 213 kn)

Armament

- Guns: 2x 7.62 mm (0.300 in) fixed forward-firing synchronised machine-guns + 1x 7.62 mm (0.300 in) flexibly-mounted machine-gun in the rear cockpit (Note:armament was not installed in the prototype)
