= French destroyer Cyclone (1925) =

Destroyer of the French Navy

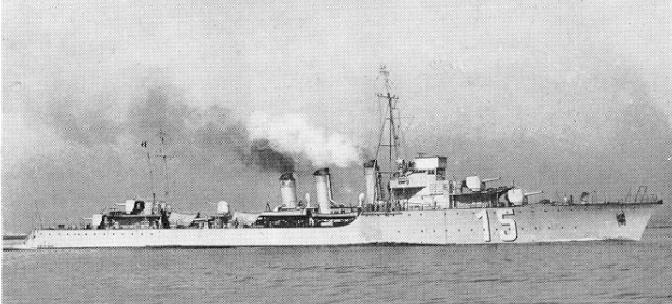
- Sister ship Ouragan underway before 1942

History

France
- Name: Cyclone
- Namesake: Cyclone
- Ordered: 5 March 1923
- Builder: FCM Graville
- Laid down: 29 September 1923
- Launched: 24 January 1925
- Completed: 31 May 1927
- Commissioned: 15 March 1927
- In service: 25 June 1928
- Fate: Scuttled, 18 June 1940

General characteristics
- Class & type: Bourrasque-class destroyer
- Displacement: 1,320 t (1,300 long tons) (standard); 1,825 t (1,796 long tons) (full load)
- Length: 105.6 m (346 ft 5 in)
- Beam: 9.7 m (31 ft 10 in)
- Draft: 3.5 m (11 ft 6 in)
- Installed power: 3 du Temple boilers; 31,000 PS (22,800 kW; 30,576 shp)
- Propulsion: 2 shafts; 2 geared steam turbines
- Speed: 33 knots (61 km/h; 38 mph)
- Range: 3,000 nmi (5,600 km; 3,500 mi) at 15 knots (28 km/h; 17 mph)
- Crew: 9 officers, 153 crewmen (wartime)
- Armament: 4 × single 130 mm (5.1 in) guns; 1 × single 75 mm (3 in) AA guns; 2 × triple 550 mm (21.7 in) torpedo tubes; 2 chutes for 16 depth charges

Cyclone was a Bourrasque-class destroyer (torpilleur d'escadre) built for the French Navy during the 1920s. She saw service in the early months of World War II before being scuttled in June 1940 to prevent her capture by advancing German forces during the Battle of France.

== Design and description ==
The Bourrasque class had an overall length of 105.6 meters (346 ft 5 in), a beam of 9.7 meters (31 ft 10 in), and a draft of 3.5 meters (11 ft 6 in). The ships displaced 1,320 metric tons (1,300 long tons) at (standard) load and 1,825 metric tons (1,796 long tons) at deep load. They were powered by two geared steam turbines, each driving one propeller shaft, using steam provided by three du Temple boilers. The turbines were designed to produce 31,000 metric horsepower (22,800 kW; 30,576 shp), which would propel the ship at 33 knots (61 km/h; 38 mph). The ships carried enough fuel oil to give them a range of 3,000 nautical miles (5,600 km; 3,500 mi) at 15 knots (28 km/h; 17 mph).

The main armament of the Bourrasque-class ships consisted of four Canon de 130 mm (5.1 in) Modèle 1919 guns in shielded single mounts, one superfiring pair each fore and aft of the superstructure. Their anti-aircraft (AA) armament consisted of a single Canon de 75 mm (3 in) Modèle 1924 gun. The ships carried two triple mounts of 550-millimeter (21.7 in) torpedo tubes amidships. A pair of depth charge chutes were built into their stern that housed a total of sixteen 200-kilogram (440 lb) depth charges.

== Construction and career ==
Cyclone was ordered on 5 March 1923 as part of the French naval construction program authorized in 1922. She was laid down by FCM Graville on 29 September 1923 and launched on 24 January 1925. She was manned for trials on 15 March 1926, and her acceptance trials were on 1 September 1926. Commissioned on 15 March 1927 and officially completed on 31 May 1927, she entered service on 25 June 1928.

Cyclone spent her early years as part of the Mediterranean Squadron, based at Toulon, France. After taking part in combined 1928 maneuvers by the squadrons based at Toulon and Brest, France—the largest French naval maneuvers since World War I—Cyclone participated in a major naval review attended by President of France Gaston Doumergue at Le Havre, France, on 3 July 1928. During festivities celebrating the 100th anniversary of the first French landing in Algeria on 13 June 1830, she took part in a major naval review off Algiers, French Algeria, on 10 May 1930. In March 1932, she was among ships representing the French Navy at the Fête vénitienne ("Venetian Fete") at Cannes, France. After taking part in combined 1935 maneuvers by the Brest and Toulon squadrons, she was among the ships involved in a major naval review for French Minister of the Navy François Piétri in France′s Baie de Douarnenez on 27 June 1935.

On 5 July 1935, Cyclone was transferred to the Second Squadron, based at Brest, for Atlantic service.

=== World War II ===
After World War II broke out in September 1939, Cyclone′s operations included providing escort to Allied convoys. On 17 October 1939, she and one of her sister ships, the destroyer Mistral, were on their way to reinforce the escort of a convoy when her crew thought they sighted the conning tower of a diving submarine. Cyclone dropped depth charges, but saw no sign of them having damaged or sunk a submarine. Other convoys she escorted included Convoy FS 1, which departed Brest on 16 April 1940 and arrived at Greenock, Scotland, on 19 April, and Convoy FP 4, which departed Brest on 26 April 1940 and arrived at Greenock on 29 April.

The Battle of France began on 10 May 1940 with the German invasion of France, Belgium, the Netherlands, and Luxembourg. Cyclone was among French destroyers and torpedo boats heavily involved in French operations in the Netherlands, escorting ships transporting French Army troops to Walcheren and then engaging in gunfire support of troops ashore until the Allied evacuation at Vlissingen on 18 May 1940. From 22 to 24 May 1940, she took part in the defense of Boulogne against advancing German forces, which included a number of gunfire support missions.

In late May 1940, Cyclone participated in the Dunkirk evacuation operation. While she was outbound from Dover, England, bound for Dunkirk during the predawn hours of 31 May 1940, the German Navy E-boat S24 hit her with a torpedo, blowing her bow off and leaving two members of her crew missing and presumed dead. The damage slowed Cyclone to a maximum speed of 5 knots. At the request of Cyclone′s commanding officer, the Polish Navy destroyer ORP Błyskawica escorted Cyclone as she limped back toward Dover. The two ships passed the French destroyer Siroco, which was packed with soldiers evacuated from Dunkirk; the German E-boats S23 and S26 torpedoed and sank Siroco an hour later, and Błyskawica left Cyclone to render assistance. After rescuing 15 survivors from Siroco, Błyskawica returned to Cyclone and escorted her the rest of the way to Dover.

Cyclone soon proceeded to Cherbourg, France, and then on to Brest, where she arrived on 3 June 1940 to undergo repairs. Her repairs were not yet complete when she was scuttled at Brest on 18 June 1940 to prevent her capture by advancing German forces. The Germans made plans to salvage the ship after the French surrender as ZF4 in October 1940, but abandoned the project in August 1941. Her wreck was recovered by the French Navy in Brest′s commercial port after Allied forces liberated Brest from the Germans in 1944.
