= French aircraft carrier Béarn =

French Navy's first aircraft carrier

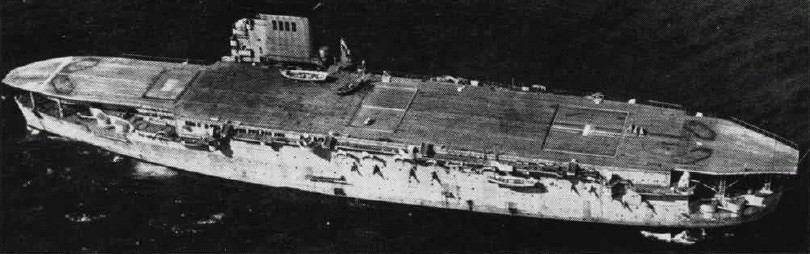
- Aerial view of Béarn

Class overview
- Preceded by: None
- Succeeded by: Joffre class (planned); Clemenceau class (actual)

History

France
- Name: Béarn
- Namesake: Béarn
- Builder: Forges et Chantiers de la Méditerranée, La Seyne-sur-Mer
- Laid down: 10 January 1914
- Launched: 15 April 1920
- Commissioned: 5 December 1927
- Stricken: 31 March 1967
- Fate: Scrapped, 1967

General characteristics (as completed)
- Type: Aircraft carrier
- Displacement: 22,146 long tons (22,501 t) (standard)
- Length: 182.5 m (598 ft 9 in) (o/a)
- Beam: 35.2 m (115 ft 6 in) (flight deck)
- Draft: 8.86 m (29 ft 1 in)
- Installed power: 12 Normand boilers; 40,000 PS (29,000 kW)
- Propulsion: 4 × shafts; 1 × steam turbine set; 2 × triple-expansion steam engines
- Speed: 21.5 knots (39.8 km/h; 24.7 mph)
- Range: 6,500 nmi (12,000 km; 7,500 mi) at 10 knots (19 km/h; 12 mph)
- Complement: 875
- Armament: 8 × single 155 mm (6.1 in) guns; 6 × single 75 mm (3 in) AA guns; 8 × single 37 mm (1.5 in) AA guns; 12 × single 8 mm (0.31 in) machine guns; 4 × 550 mm (21.7 in) torpedo tubes
- Armor: Belt: 83 mm (3.3 in); Flight deck: 24 mm (0.9 in)
- Aircraft carried: 32
- Aviation facilities: 3 × elevators

Béarn ([beaʁn]) was an aircraft carrier converted from an incomplete Normandie-class battleship for the Marine nationale (French Navy) during the 1920s. Entering service in 1928, the navy intended to use her to develop tactics and techniques for carrier aviation. The only aircraft carrier France produced until after World War II, the ship played a minor role in early stages of the war, training in home waters and conducting pilot training.

In late May 1940 Béarn ferried gold to purchase aircraft from the United States, but she was diverted to Martinique in the French West Indies when the French armistice with Germany was signed in June. Under pressure from the United States, which was worried about the Germans taking control of her if she returned to France, the carrier remained there for the next four years. To placate the Americans, the local commander agreed to have her immobilized in mid-1942. The Vichy French government ordered him to sabotage the ship in May 1943 and he ultimately complied by having Béarn run aground.

She was towed to Puerto Rico after the islands joined the Free French later that year for preliminary repairs that would allow her to steam under her own power to New Orleans, Louisiana, to be converted into an aircraft ferry. The conversion was completed in early 1945; on her first trip with a load of aircraft she collided with another ship and had to divert to French Morocco for emergency repairs. Full repairs took almost six months and she then transported personnel and equipment between Metropolitan France and French North Africa for several months.

In October the ship sailed for French Indochina with aircraft, material and supplies as the French planned to reassert control over their Japanese-occupied colony. Béarn remained there for a year before returning home where she was immediately placed in reserve. Two years later, the ship was reactivated as the flagship of the Marine nationale's submarine and anti-submarine group and also served as a submarine tender. In 1960 Béarn was hulked and served as a barracks ship until she became so uneconomical that a replacement vessel was constructed in 1966. She was sold for scrap the following year.

== Description as a battleship ==
The Normandie-class ships were 175 m (574 ft 2 in) long at the waterline, and 176.4 m (578 ft 9 in) long overall. They had a beam of 27 m (88 ft 7 in) and a mean draft of 8.84 m (29 ft) at full load. They were intended to displace 25,250 metric tons (24,850 long tons) at normal load and 28,270 t (27,820 long tons) at deep load. The ships would have had a crew of 44 officers and 1,160 enlisted men when serving as a flagship.

Unlike her sister ships, Béarn was intended to be equipped with two sets of Parsons steam turbines, each driving a pair of propeller shafts using steam provided by 28 Niclausse boilers. The engines were rated at 32,000 metric horsepower (23,536 kW; 31,562 shp) and were designed for a speed of 21 knots (39 km/h; 24 mph), although use of forced draft was intended to increase their output to 45,000 PS (33,097 kW; 44,384 shp) and the maximum speed to 22.5 knots (41.7 km/h; 25.9 mph). The ships were designed to carry enough coal and fuel oil to give them an estimated range of 6,600 nautical miles (12,200 km; 7,600 mi) at 12 knots (22 km/h; 14 mph).

=== Armament and armor ===
The main battery of the Normandie class consisted of a dozen Canon de 340 mm (13.4 in) Modèle 1912M guns mounted in three quadruple turrets. One turret was placed forward, one amidships, and one aft of the superstructure, all on the centerline. The ships would also have been equipped with a secondary armament of 24 Canon de 138.6 mm (5.5 in) Modèle 1910 guns, each singly mounted in casemates near the main-gun turrets. Anti-aircraft defense probably would have been provided by four Canon de 47 mm (1.9 in) Modèle 1902 AA guns. The ships also would have been equipped with six underwater 450 mm (17.7 in) torpedo tubes, three on each broadside.

The waterline armor belt of the Normandie-class ships extended almost the entire length of the hull, save for 5 meters (16 ft 5 in) at the stern. The thickest portion of the armor protected the hull between the barbettes of the end turrets and was 300 millimeters (11.8 in) thick. From the forward barbette to the bow, the plates progressively reduced in thickness from 260 to 160 millimeters (10.2 to 6.3 in), aft of the rear turret, the armor plates were progressively reduced in thickness from 260 millimeters to 140 millimeters (5.5 in). The turrets were protected with an armor thickness of 300 millimeters on their faces, 210 millimeters (8.3 in) on the sides, and 100 millimeters on the roof. The casemates were defended by 160-millimeter armor plates. The portions of the barbettes that extended outside the upper armor were protected by 250-millimeter (9.8 in) plates. The sides of the conning tower were 266 millimeters (10.5 in) thick and its roof was also 100 millimeters thick. The lower armored deck ranged in thickness from 14 to 70 millimeters (0.55 to 2.76 in) with the thickest portion of the deck where it sloped to meet the bottom of the armor belt. The upper armored deck was 26 to 80 millimeters (1.0 to 3.1 in) thick with the thickest part on the outer edges.

The torpedo bulkhead of the Normandies consisted of a 20-millimeter (0.8 in) nickel-steel plate, faced with a 10-millimeter (0.4 in) plate of corrugated mild steel that was intended to absorb the shock wave from a torpedo warhead's detonation. Abreast the boiler rooms were very deep coal bunkers that were also intended to help absorb a torpedo detonation.

== Construction and conversion ==
Béarn, named for the historic province of Béarn, was ordered on 30 December 1912 and was laid down at the Forges et Chantiers de la Méditerranée shipyard in La Seyne on 10 January 1914. The outbreak of World War I in August 1914 interrupted construction, which was halted for the duration of the conflict. By that time, work on Béarn had not significantly progressed: her hull was only 8–10 percent complete and her engines were only 25 percent finished. Her boilers were 17 percent assembled, and her turrets were 20 percent completed. The hull was launched on 15 April 1920 to clear the slipway, though the Marine nationale had not yet decided what to do with it.

That year, a French delegation visited the British aircraft carrier HMS Argus, and out of this visit came a proposal to convert one of the incomplete Normandie-class battleships into an aircraft carrier, which was designated Project 171. The first step was to conduct trials using Béarn's hull which was only complete up to the lower armored deck and lacked her belt armor and propulsion machinery. A 45-by-9-meter (148 by 30 ft) wooden platform was built on the lower deck with an improvised arresting gear system that was weighted down with sandbags. Lieutenant de vaisseau Paul Teste conducted the first tests in October using British Sopwith 1½ Strutters. Further trials were conducted the following year with the Hanriot HD.3.

Still undecided on whether to complete the ship as either a battleship or an aircraft carrier, the Marine nationale's hand was forced when the Washington Naval Treaty was signed on 6 February 1922 and ruled out the former possibility. On 18 April the Marine nationale decided that Béarn, rather than any of her sisters, would be converted into an aircraft carrier because her construction was the least advanced and would thus be the cheapest to convert. Her four sisters, which were closer to completion, were instead broken up for scrap. Much of the equipment from these ships was used to complete Béarn and several cruisers that had been ordered in 1922. A contract for the conversion was signed with her builder on 4 August 1923 for 66.33 million French francs.

=== General characteristics and machinery ===
Béarn was 175 meters (574 ft 2 in) long between perpendiculars and 182.5 meters (598 ft 9 in) long overall. She had a beam of 27.17 meters (89 ft 2 in) at the waterline and 35.2 meters (115 ft 6 in) at the flight deck. She displaced 22,146 long tons (22,501 t) at standard load and 28,400 long tons (28,900 t) at full load, which gave her a draft of 8.86 meters (29 ft 1 in). A retractable, four-story charthouse was installed at the forward end of the flight deck; when retracted there were views forward and to the sides underneath the flight deck. Including the airgroup, her crew numbered 45 officers and 830 enlisted men.

The Marine nationale decided to revert to the mixed propulsion machinery of Béarn's sisters rather than use her intended pair of direct-drive steam turbines and used the machinery from the lead ship of the class, Normandie. One set of Parsons turbines drove the two inner propeller shafts and two vertical triple-expansion steam engines were on the outer shafts for low-speed cruising. This was intended to reduce fuel consumption at cruising speeds, as direct-drive turbines are very inefficient at moderate to low speeds. The engines were rated at a total of 40,000 metric horsepower (29,000 kW) using steam supplied by a dozen new oil-burning Normand boilers that had a working pressure of 20 kg/cm^{2} (1,961 kPa; 284 psi), which gave Béarn a maximum speed of 21.5 knots (39.8 km/h; 24.7 mph). The boiler uptakes were trunked into a single funnel integrated into the island on the starboard side of the flight deck. A large vented chamber, nicknamed the cul de lampe (lamp base), was fitted on the side of the hull below the funnel to mix cooler air with the hot boiler exhaust to reduce air turbulence over the flight deck. The ship carried a maximum of 2,100 metric tons (2,067 long tons) of fuel oil which gave her a range of 6,500 nautical miles (12,000 km; 7,500 mi) at a cruising speed of 10 kn (19 km/h; 12 mph). Electric power was provided by four 400-kilowatt (540 hp) steam-powered dynamos; a pair of 150-kilowatt (200 hp) diesel generators were used when the ship was in harbor.

=== Aviation facilities ===
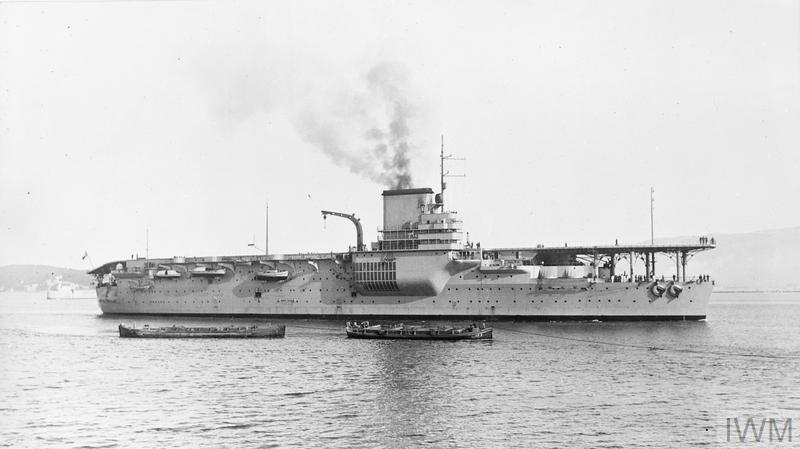
Béarn without her armament fitted

The ship's flight deck was 180 meters (590 ft 7 in) long and it had a maximum width of 27 meters (88 ft 7 in). The deck itself was composed of two overlapping 12-millimeter (0.47 in) plates covered by 50–70 millimeters (2.0–2.8 in) of African teak. She retained the primitive arresting gear used during her trials when completed, but it was replaced during her first refit. The carrier was also fitted with a 12-metric-ton (11.8-long-ton) crane aft of the island that had the secondary task of handling the pair of seaplanes that were embarked for use when the ship was in harbor.

Béarn was fitted with three electrically powered elevators that transferred aircraft between the flight deck and the upper hangar. (Note: Despite what has been stated in many sources, the recently released official plans show that the elevators could not reach the lower hangar deck.) The forward elevator could lift 2,000 kg (4,400 lb) and measured 8 m (26 ft 3 in) long and 12 m (39 ft 4 in) wide as it was intended to handle only fighters. The elevator was unusual as it had a two-story configuration so that aircraft could be flown off while it was in the lowered position. The center elevator was intended for reconnaissance aircraft with their wings deployed and was 10 by 15 m (32 ft 10 in by 49 ft 3 in) in size. It could handle 5,000 kg (11,000 lb), although it was slow, requiring three minutes for a complete cycle. To enable flight operations to continue while it was at the hangar-deck level, the open elevator shaft was provided with heavy clamshell doors at the flight-deck level. The aft elevator was 15 meters square and was designed for torpedo bombers. It had the same capacity as the center elevator, but was even slower, requiring five minutes to cycle, and had the same clamshell doors at the flight-deck level.

The ship was designed with two hangar decks, of which only the upper 124-meter-long (406 ft 10 in) hangar could be used for aircraft operations as the lower hangar was dedicated to workshops and aircraft assembly and storage facilities. The hangars had nominal widths of 19.5 m (64 ft), but equipment and ready-use weapon storage racks reduced the effective width to 15 meters. The upper hangar had a height of 6.5 m (21 ft 4 in) except in the forward section, which was intended for use by fighters, where it was reduced to 5 m (16 ft 5 in) by an extra deck that contained the berthing for the air group. Both hangars were subdivided into four sections by asbestos fire curtains and equipped with three overhead rails with which to move aircraft and other heavy equipment. The lower hangar was equipped with three large hatches at the base of the elevator shafts for access to the upper hangar. The bottoms of the elevators were fitted with rails that matched the overhead rails in the hangars; aircraft would be hung from the rails and the elevators would be raised or lowered as needed. Béarn stored 100,000 litres (22,000 imp gal; 26,000 US gal) of aviation gasoline in three compartments within the armored citadel which were filled with inert nitrogen gas as a fire suppressant measure.

Béarn was designed to accommodate up to thirty-two aircraft, one squadron each of a dozen torpedo bombers and reconnaissance aircraft, and a squadron of eight fighters. The ship initially deployed with six operational aircraft of each type, although this increased to nine aircraft each in 1933 for a total of twenty-seven aircraft in the air group. Early in her career she carried a pair of CAMS 37A seaplanes that were used when she was in harbor.

=== Armament, armor and fire control ===
The ship's main-gun armament consisted of eight 50-caliber Canon de 155 mm (6.1 in) Modèle 1921 guns in casemates at the corners of the superstructure for defense against surface attack. The guns fired a 56.5-kilogram (125 lb) shell at a muzzle velocity of 850 m/s (2,800 ft/s). This gave them a range of 26,180 meters (28,630 yd) at the mount's maximum elevation of +40°. Their ammunition hoists came from her sister Flandre. Béarn carried 250 rounds for each gun.

Her anti-aircraft defense was provided by six 50-caliber Canon de 75 mm (3 in) Modèle 1924 guns, eight 50-caliber Canon de 37 mm (1.5 in) Modèle 1925 guns, and a dozen Hotchkiss Mitrailleuse de 8 mm (0.315 in) Modèle 1914 machine guns, all on single mounts. The 75 mm guns also had a muzzle velocity of 850 m/s when firing their 5.93-kilogram (13.1 lb) shells. At an elevation of +40°, the guns had a range of 14,100 meters (15,400 yd). The carrier had stowage for 450 rounds per gun. The 37 mm guns were semi-automatic loading and only had a rate of fire of 20 rounds per minute. They had an effective range of 5,000 meters (5,500 yd) with their 0.73-kilogram (1.6 lb) shells which were fired at a muzzle velocity of 810 m/s (2,700 ft/s). The ship had 375 rounds for each gun. Béarn was also fitted with four above-water mounts for 550-millimeter (21.7 in) torpedo tubes; the ship carried eight Modèle 1923D torpedoes for them.

The original waterline belt armor of the Normandie-class battleships was totally inappropriate for Béarn's new role as an aircraft carrier and was replaced by a thinner, but much deeper belt of 83-millimeter (3.3 in) non-cemented armor that extended from 2.35 m (7 ft 9 in) above the waterline to 3.124 m (10 ft 3 in) below it. The lower armored deck was not altered, but the thickness of the upper armored deck was slightly reduced to 24 mm (0.94 in). The casemates had 50-millimeter (2 in) sides and a 24 mm roof. The coal bunkers protecting the underwater sides of the boiler rooms were not only retained, but were extended to cover the engine rooms and the forward oil tanks as the Marine nationale feared that the existing torpedo bulkhead could not withstand the power of the larger torpedo warheads that had come into use since the original system was designed.

Range data for the pair of mechanical Modèle 1923B fire-control computers that controlled the 155 mm guns and the torpedoes was supplied by four 3-meter (9 ft 10 in) coincidence rangefinders that were mounted on sponsons on the sides of the hull. All-around coverage was assured, except where each was masked by the island, because each rangefinder protruded 0.5 m (1 ft 8 in) above the flight deck. The 75 mm guns were controlled by two high-angle directors fitted with 3-meter OPL rangefinders, one on the port side and the other atop the forward end of the island.

== Career ==
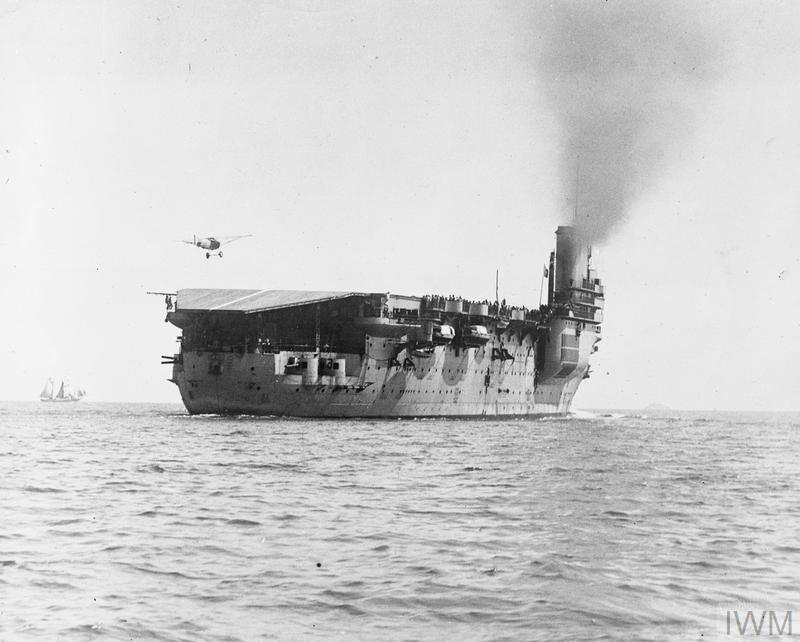
The carrier conducting landing trials in April–June 1927 with a Gourdou-Leseurre GL.22ET.1 trainer

Béarn was commissioned on 5 December 1927, although she did not enter service until 1 May 1928. The ship was assigned to the 1^{re} Escadre de ligne (1st Battleship Squadron) of the 1^{re} Escadre (1st Squadron) in the Mediterranean. A week later the carrier loaded aboard Aéronavale's (French Naval Aviation) reconnaissance squadron Escadrille 7S1 and the bomber squadron Escadrille 7B1, both equipped with Levasseur PL.4 aircraft. That evening Béarn embarked a three-man senatorial commission on a fact-finding trip to Corsica and French Tunisia that lasted until the 20th.

On 27 May Escadrille 7C1, equipped with Lévy-Biche LB.2 fighters flew aboard for a cruise to the Atlantic and the English Channel, visiting ports in French Morocco en route. On 20 June Béarn participated in an exercise where the 1^{re} Escadre attacked the defenses of Lorient and conducted amphibious landings. She was present during a naval review in Le Havre when the fleet was reviewed by the President of France, Gaston Doumergue on 3 July. The squadron visited ports in Normandy, during which time a LB.2 was forced to ditch, before returning to Brittany on 20 July. The squadron departed for Toulon on 29 July, although Béarn was diverted to Santander, Spain, to be visited by King Alfonso XIII. After a short visit to French Algeria, the ship returned to Toulon on 4 August. André Jubelin, a future admiral and pioneering naval aviator, served aboard the ship during this time, although he had not yet qualified as a pilot. It was during this cruise that the drawbacks of the carrier's low speed became apparent. When operating with the fleet she had to turn into the wind to launch two aircraft and it took her an hour and a quarter at a speed of 16 knots (30 km/h; 18 mph) to rejoin the squadron, despite its low cruising speed of 12 knots (22 km/h; 14 mph).

Béarn made a short training cruise to Corsica and French North Africa between 12 October and 9 November to qualify pilots. Limited by shortages of aircraft (the LB.2s were unserviceable) and experienced pilots, 7C1 only flew two Dewoitine D.1 fighters, 7S2 three PL.4s and 7B1 had four PL.4s. Between them the three squadrons mustered only seven pilots. In December the carrier began a short refit that angled the forward flight deck 4.5 degrees downwards as the first step in allowing aircraft to land over her bow. In addition, the primitive sandbag arresting gear was replaced by two prototypes of mechanically operated arresting gear. After the refit was completed in May, Béarn used her CAMS 37 seaplanes to conduct trials evaluating the visibility of the submerged submarine Requin on 4–16 May. The ship participated in exercises in the Western Mediterranean and off the coast of Morocco from 27 May to 10 July. A few months later the carrier cruised down the Atlantic coast of Morocco, flying a few reconnaissance missions in southern Morocco in late October to intimidate any rebellious Berber tribesmen and visiting Dakar, French West Africa, Madeira and the Canary Islands. During this voyage a single Wibault 74 fighter was tested.

During Béarn's refit from December 1929 to April 1930, the downward angle of the stern was changed to match the 4.5 degrees of the bow. On 8 May the carrier had aboard 10 D.1s, 5 LB.2s, 16 PL.4s and 3 CAMS 37s. Two days later she participated in the naval review of the 1^{re} Escadre by Doumergue in Algiers that commemorated the centenary of the French conquest of Algeria. Upon her return to Toulon on 14 June, the LB.2s were replaced by D.1s, pending delivery of the Wibault 74s on order. At the end of December 7B1 began practicing simulated torpedo drops. The Levasseur PL.7 torpedo bomber had been delivered to 7B1 when Béarn accompanied the 1^{re} Escadre on its North African cruise from 8 May to 24 June. She was refitted at the end of the year.

The Levasseur PL.10 had replaced the PL.4 in 7S1 by April 1932. On the third of that month, the ship was visited by François Piétri, Minister of National Defense. At this time 7C1 was having its new Wibault 74s modified and could not participate in the squadron's Eastern Mediterranean cruise from 15 April to 25 June. They made their first deck landings on 20 July. The ship was transferred to the 2^{e} Escadre de ligne (2nd Battleship Squadron) in October. The following month an inspection criticized the carrier's combat readiness as she was limited to a speed of 15 knots (28 km/h; 17 mph). In 1933 the strength of each squadron was increased from six aircraft to nine, except for the fighter squadron which increased to ten. During the 1st Squadron's cruise to North Africa from 3 May to 24 June, Béarn's squadrons practiced searching for and attacking enemy ships from a land base in mid-May and used Oran, French Algeria, for target practice a few days later. A few months later, 7B1's PL.10s practiced attacking battleships escorted by destroyers on 20 July. A few weeks later, the carrier participated in a naval review by Pierre Cot, Minister of Air, on 5 August. Béarn was out of service from August to November, during which time 7S1 converted from PL.10s to the PL.101, an improved version of the same aircraft.

=== 1934–1935 reconstruction ===
By January 1931 Béarn was in bad shape due to the jamming of the center elevator's clamshell doors and the poor state of her boilers; by October studies were being undertaken for a major reconstruction to include replacement of the boilers, modifications to the forward elevator and replacement of the 75 mm guns by the newer and more powerful Canon de 100 mm (3.9 in) Modèle 1927 AA gun. Cost and feasibility studies were also ordered to investigate the possibilities of replacement of the direct-drive turbines with geared models, fitting torpedo bulges and better horizontal protection against the increased threat from land-based aircraft.

If she was fitted with geared turbines and new boilers for 60,000 metric horsepower (44,000 kW), the designers estimated that the carrier would have a speed of 23.4 knots (43.3 km/h; 26.9 mph), although installation of bulges would cost over a knot (22.3 knots (41.3 km/h; 25.7 mph)) and increase displacement by about 500 t (492 long tons). The improvement in speed would not be enough to allow Béarn to operate with the new Dunkerque-class fast battleships and it was not possible to upgrade the ship's horizontal protection. The Ministre de la Marine (Navy Minister) did not believe that it was worthwhile to invest a large sum of money in a 20-year-old hull and only authorized 25 million francs to be spent on replacing the boilers with six of the latest du Temple boilers, enlargement of the cul de lampe and removal of the charthouse and the torpedo tubes. Furthermore, the ineffectual 8 mm machine guns were replaced by six twin mounts of the Mitrailleuse de 13.2 mm (0.52 in) Modèle 1929 machine gun, the high-angle directors were upgraded and new rangefinders were fitted for the AA guns.

The reconstruction began in February 1934 and lasted until November 1935. During her machinery trials on 26 August, Béarn averaged 20.8 knots (38.5 km/h; 23.9 mph) with five of her six boilers lit. The ship was assigned directly to the 1^{re} Escadre when the reconstruction was finished and she was briefly refitted from mid-December to mid-January 1936. At the beginning of the year, 7S1 and 7B1 were at full strength, but 7C1 had only 11 Wibault 74s on hand. Béarn was attached to the 2nd Squadron for their cruise down to French West Africa on 13 January–29 February, although she visited Casablanca, French Morocco, and Mers-el-Kébir, French Algeria, on the voyage home. In March, a Potez 565 took off from Béarn, the first time a twin-engined aircraft had ever operated from an aircraft carrier. The ship made one last training cruise with the 1st Squadron to French North Africa from 8 May to 24 June before her transfer to the 2^{e} Escadre de légère (2nd Light Squadron) of the 2^{e} Escadre became effective on 1 October. She was initially based at Brest, but was transferred to Cherbourg on 27 November and participated in a training cruise to Madeira and French West Africa from 13 January to 26 February 1937. After returning home, she conducted tests with a LeO C.30 autogyro in late March. Béarn participated in a naval review in Brest for the Ministre de Marine, Alphonse Gasnier-Duparc, on 27 May. The following month, her aircraft began training for night operations.

For the 1938 training cruise of the 2^{e} Escadre, Béarn only embarked 7S1 and 7B1 squadrons. They exercised off the Azores, Madeira and the Moroccan Atlantic coast while visiting Lisbon, Portugal. During this cruise, a PL.101 towed a target for twilight anti-aircraft gunnery training and then landed aboard the carrier in the dark without incident. This was the first French night carrier landing made out of range of land. Béarn received a brief refit from late July to 25 September; the work was accelerated as tensions rose during the Munich Crisis in September. On 1 October the ship's squadrons were redesignated: 7C1 became AC1, 7B1 became AB1 and 7S2 became AB2. During an exercise in November, AB1 had six aircraft and AB2 had nine. In October and November, AC1 began deploying the Dewoitine D.373 fighter, with three pilots making the first successful deck landings during this time. Béarn was refitted from 20 January to 5 April 1939, which included retubing some of her boilers. During a storm on 22 January, the ship broke loose from her moorings, but she was caught by tugboats and temporarily docked at Laninon, Brest. Beginning in early 1939, AC1 began receiving the Dewoitine D.376, a version of the 373 with folding wings. The folding mechanism took an hour to operate and its use was abandoned by the carrier's crew since her elevators were big enough to handle the fighters with their wings spread. In July Béarn conducted deck-landing trials for the prototypes of the Loire-Nieuport LN.401 dive bomber and Vought V-156F dive bombers purchased from the United States.

=== World War II ===
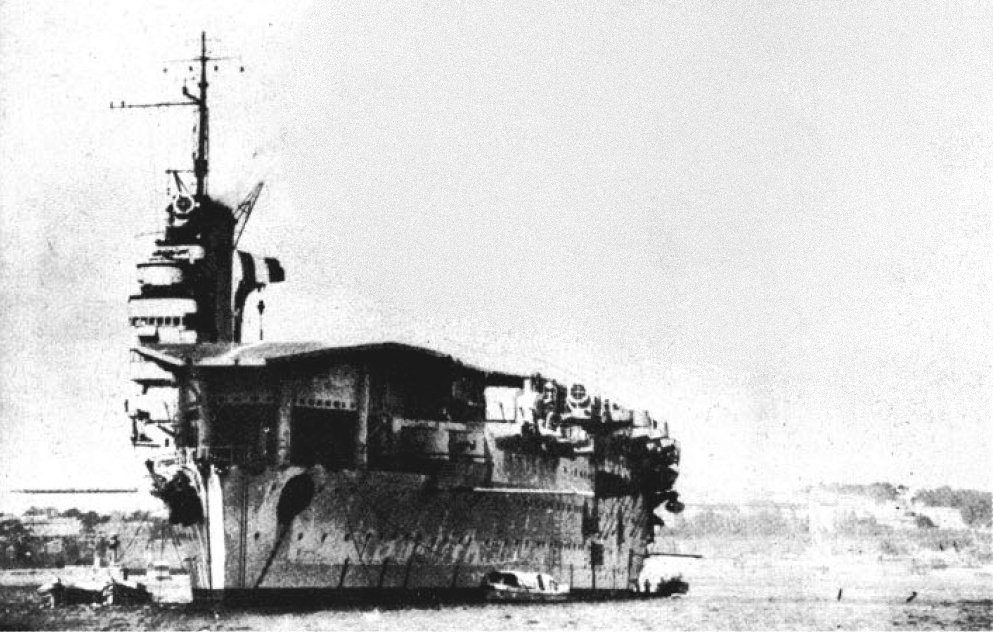
Béarn before her conversion into an aircraft transport

The day after the French declaration of war against Germany on 3 September 1939, Béarn received orders to fly off her aircraft. On 5 October, the carrier was nominally assigned to Force L, together with the battleship Dunkerque and three light cruisers, which was tasked with searching the West Indies for the German cruiser Admiral Graf Spee. In reality the carrier remained in Brest, conducting anti-aircraft exercises and beginning the process of being modified to serve as a tanker for Breguet 521 Bizerte and Laté.523 flying boats. Although the modifications principally consisted of an addition of a 12-meter (39 ft 4 in) boom to support a refuelling hose, the work lasted from October to April 1940. While docked at Laninon on 23 March, two crewmen were severely injured when blasting work nearby on a new slipway caused the front of the carrier to be struck by numerous pieces of rubble.

Béarn was ordered to Toulon on 13 April to begin deck landing training for Escadrilles AB1 and 2S3. The former was equipped with Vought V-156Fs and the latter had Levasseur PL.101s, but was supposed to convert to Loire-Nieuport LN.411 dive bombers in May. The ship arrived on 18 April and began training with the pilots of AB1 five days later. Training continued until the German invasion of France on 10 May when AB1 was ordered north. The carrier returned to Toulon the following day to off-load the equipment of both squadrons and was ordered to prepare for a mission of long duration beginning on 18 May. That day, Béarn's crew loaded 3,880 cases of the Bank of France's gold bullion weighing 147 metric tons (145 long tons) and valued at 9,241,000,000 francs. The gold was intended to pay for armaments purchased from the United States under its "Cash and carry" policy which allowed US companies to supply arms to belligerents while still retaining American neutrality – a practice that favored Britain and France. The carrier was escorted through the Mediterranean and to the Atlantic coast of Morocco by the destroyers Tramontane, Tornade, and Typhon as well as maritime patrol aircraft. After a brief stopover in Casablanca to refuel on 21 May, her escort was reinforced with a pair of Bougainville-class avisos until the 25th when Béarn rendezvoused with the light cruisers Jeanne d'Arc and Émile Bertin west of Madeira, which were transporting bullion themselves, and took over the escort mission. The flotilla arrived in Halifax, Canada, on 1 June.

==== Post-French Armistice to 1945 ====
Béarn began loading aircraft ordered from American manufacturers on 3 June, including 15 new Curtiss H-75A-4 fighters, 25 Stinson 105 utility aircraft, and 6 Brewster Buffalo fighters intended for the Belgian Air Component. Sold as surplus by the US Navy, 44 Curtiss SBC Helldiver biplane dive bombers arrived on 15 June and were loaded that day. The carrier and Jeanne d'Arc departed the next morning, bound for Brest. The ships did not hear the French High Command's order to divert to Fort-de-France, on the island of Martinique in the French West Indies, broadcast on 18 June, but did hear the repeat message on the 20th, after Brest had already been occupied by the Germans. They arrived at Fort-de-France on 27 June and became one of a dozen or so French ships that were effectively interned at Martinique—at U.S. insistence—to prevent their use by Germany. The carrier's aircraft were unloaded ashore on 19 July and the 0.5-inch (12.7 mm) M2 Browning machine guns aboard the fighters were removed to be used to bolster the anti-aircraft defenses of the French ships; Béarn received a dozen of the weapons. Many of the aircraft were later destroyed either by exposure to the elements or scavenging.

Rising tensions with Thailand and Japan over French Indochina beginning in September caused the Vichy Government to open successful negotiations with the Americans to allow the delivery of Béarn's aircraft and supplies to Indochina, but this was rejected by the German Armistice Commission which had to approve all Vichy French movements. The commission did approve the transfer of the aircraft and supplies to Africa, but this was rejected by the Americans. The ship made brief deployments to Guadeloupe in May and August 1941. When her hull was being scraped on 6 December, a diver discovered that one propeller blade had fallen off. In March 1942, all of her 37 mm AA guns were dismounted and transferred to land installations. On 19 April, due to the return to power of the pro-German politician Pierre Laval, the United States pressured Amiral (Admiral) Georges Robert, High Commissioner of the Republic to the Antilles, to immobilize the ship; negotiations lasted until 14 May as Robert required that the carrier be able to move in case of hurricanes, but he finally agreed and the German Armistice Commission concurred on the 22nd. As part of the agreement, Béarn transferred two-thirds of her fuel to an oil tanker and had four of her six boilers disabled. The ship transferred three of her 75 mm AA guns to the naval base in June. She may have also transferred her forward 155 mm guns to the base around this time.

The Vichy Government ordered that the ships in the Antilles be sabotaged on 5 May, but Robert procrastinated following the order, despite reiterations on 12 and 19 May. That day the carrier was run aground near the entrance to the port; one compartment flooded when the hull was pierced by wreckage. On 15 June, Béarn was reduced to special reserve. Robert ordered her propulsion machinery compartments flooded on 3 July as a further act of sabotage, but this likely would have caused her to capsize so the turbines and boilers were filled half-full of seawater. When her aircraft were surveyed in June, 27 Stinsons and 10 Curtis Hawks were still serviceable for service in North Africa. The French Antilles joined the Free French when the destroyer Le Terrible arrived in Martinique on 14 July.

Béarn was refloated on 8 September, after she had been pillaged of equipment by the other units based in Martinique, although one dynamo and a steering motor were refurbished to facilitate her tow to Puerto Rico that began on 27 September and ended three days later when she arrived at Ensenada Honda. The next several months were spent refurbishing her propulsion machinery and electrical equipment. The carrier began post-refit trials on 17 November, but they were unsuccessful as she had to be towed back to the dockyard. After repairs and further testing, Béarn steamed to the Todd Shipyards facility in New Orleans, Louisiana, arriving on 3 December.

Given her age and limitations, the French did not wish to begin a long and costly conversion into an escort carrier, but settled for a faster and cheaper conversion into an aircraft transport. Shortages of materials, skilled labor and the difficulties of working with French equipment caused the conversion to take much longer than expected. By May virtually all of the propulsion and auxiliary machinery had been removed to be overhauled with the shipyard expecting all of the work to be completed by 1 September 1944. The Marine nationale did not believe that estimate; its concerns were borne out when a more realistic estimate of 15 December was made on 20 June. Even that date was missed by several weeks as work finally ceased on 30 December.

One of the major changes made during the conversion was that her original armament and fire-control equipment was replaced by four 38-caliber 5-inch (127 mm) Mk 37 dual-purpose guns in single mounts where the 155 mm guns had formerly been, twenty-four 1.1-inch (28 mm) guns in six quadruple mounts, one each at the bow and stern and the remaining guns in sponsons on the side of the hull, and twenty-six 20-millimeter (0.8 in) Oerlikon guns in individual mountings. Four Mk 51 directors were added to control the 5- and 1.1-inch guns and SA-2 early-warning and SF surface-search radars were installed on the island. Béarn stowed 300 rounds per gun for the 5-inch guns, 2,210 for each 1.1-inch gun and 8,862 rounds for each Oerlikon. Other changes included the removal of the middle elevator, the addition of a 17-metric-ton (16.7-long-ton) crane on the port side of the flight deck and the replacement of her diesel generators by a pair of 300-kW General Motors generators. The protective coal was removed and the coal bunkers were converted into oil tanks, which increased her fuel capacity to 4,500 t (4,429 long tons).

The ship departed New Orleans on 30 December, bound for Portsmouth, Virginia, where she was docked on 8–19 January 1945 to fix issues that arose on the voyage. On 24 February Béarn conducted speed trials and reached 17.93 knots (33.21 km/h; 20.63 mph). She spent the next month working up and was declared ready on 26 February. Béarn had to wait for the arrival of 230 additional crewmen before she could steam to New York City to pick up her cargo on 3 March. This included 148 American soldiers and sailors, 88 aircraft and 85 cases of material that totalled 455 t (448 long tons). Twenty-six North American P-51 Mustang fighters and three Douglas SBD Dauntless dive bombers were stowed inside the hangar with fourteen P-51s and forty-one Republic P-47 Thunderbolts on the flight deck. The ship also embarked a four-man US Navy liaison detachment.

Béarn steamed from New York on 7 March as part of Convoy CU 61. Early on the morning of 13 March, the transport briefly lost power during heavy weather and collided with the troop ship USAT J. W. McAndrew. The impact killed 68 soldiers and 1 Naval Armed Guardsman aboard the troop ship and Béarn had 1 crewman missing, 3 killed and 7 wounded. Both ships suffered hull damage and the transport had her starboard forward guns disabled. They both sailed to Ponta Delgada, Azores, for emergency repairs and arrived there on the 22nd. Béarn received permanent repairs at Casablanca from 15 March to 18 July. Despite this, she required further repairs which she received at Gibraltar on 22–30 July. After sailing to Oran on 31 July, the ship loaded 535 personnel, 400 t (390 long tons) of material and part of a damaged Bréguet 730 flying boat bound for Toulon, where she arrived on 3 August. She then loaded 1,378 men of the 13e Demi-Brigade de la Légion Etrangère (13th Demi-Brigade of the Foreign Legion), 280 airmen and 275 vehicles that she ferried to Algiers on the 9th and then transported 174 legionnaires to Oran four days later. Béarn was refitted there from 13 August to 9 September.

=== Postwar service ===
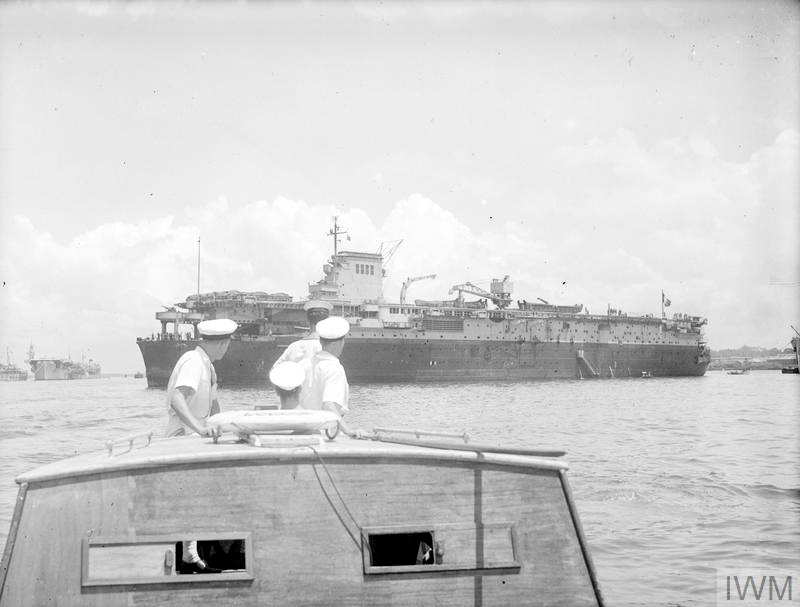
Béarn in Colombo Harbor, British Ceylon, October 1945

As part of the French attempt to reassert their colonial rule in Indochina, Béarn ferried men, supplies and material, including 215 vehicles and 9 LCVP landing craft from Marseille to French Indochina, arriving at the latter on 21 October 1945. The ship departed for British Singapore on 26 November and arrived two days later. In December 1945, Béarn transported fourteen ex-British Landing Craft Assault (LCAs) and six LCVPs from Singapore to Vietnam, and contributed a shore party to man them in the Dinassauts (river flotillas). As Chinese Nationalist troops began withdrawing from Northern Vietnam in early 1946, the ship ferried some Piper L-4 Grasshopper liaison aircraft and three ex-Japanese Aichi E13A floatplanes of Escadrille 8S, together with 15 LCAs and 1 Landing Craft Support, to the Haiphong area at the beginning of March. The transport's medical facilities were used to treat the wounded until her departure on the 11th. When she reached Saigon three days later, they were transferred to hospital there.

Béarn sailed for Manila, capital of the Philippines, on 19 March to load supplies and returned on 11 May after demobilizing some of her long-term crew. The ship spent the next month ferrying supplies and material between ports in Indochina. On 10 June, she loaded 450 troops, including 419 wounded men, aboard and departed for Toulon. Slowed by boiler problems en route, the transport arrived on 23 July and was assigned to the special reserve on 1 October. On 9 December 1948 Béarn was assigned to the Groupe d'Action Anti-Sous-Marine (Anti-Submarine Action Group (GASM)) as its flagship. This initially consisted of a group of dedicated anti-submarine ships, the Groupe des Bâtiments de Surface (GBS) and a group of submarines, the Groupe des sous-marins disponibles (GSMD), with the transport serving as a submarine tender. The GBS was disbanded on 15 September 1950 and the GSMD reverted to its original name, 1^{re} Escadrille de sous-marins (1st Submarine Flotilla), on 1 October. By 1952, only the five-inch guns remained aboard. The number of crewmen berthed aboard Béarn fluctuated, but it averaged about 800 men, which taxed the ship's cooking and sanitation facilities. In 1955, she became the first ship in the Marine nationale to be fitted with a television receiver. The GASM was disbanded on 10 October 1960 and the ship was relegated to service as a barracks ship, although she retained her torpedo workshop. Her maintenance costs kept rising to the point that it became cheaper to build a barracks for the submarine crews in 1966. Béarn was condemned and renamed Q 419 on 31 March 1967. The ship was sold for scrap on 4 September and towed to Savona, Italy, four days later to be broken up. Over the course of her long career, Béarn never launched her aircraft in combat.
