= French ship Simoun =

At least two ships of the French Navy have been named Simoun:

- French torpedo boat Simoun, a Cyclone-class torpedo boat launched in 1902.
- French destroyer Simoun, a Bourrasque-class destroyer launched in 1924 and scrapped in 1950.
