= French destroyer Typhon =

Destroyer of the French Navy

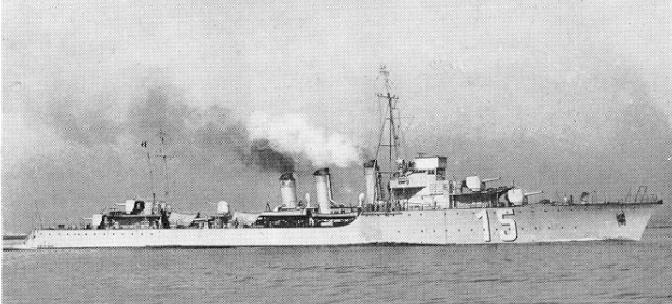
- Sister ship Ouragan underway before 1942

History

France
- Name: Typhon
- Namesake: Typhoon
- Ordered: 5 March 1923
- Builder: Forges et Chantiers de la Gironde, Lormont
- Laid down: 1 September 1923
- Launched: 22 May 1925
- Completed: 27 June 1928
- Commissioned: 15 February 1928
- In service: 22 October 1928
- Fate: Scuttled 9 November 1942

General characteristics
- Class & type: Bourrasque-class destroyer
- Displacement: 1,320 t (1,300 long tons) (standard)
- Length: 105.6 m (346 ft 5.5 in)
- Beam: 9.7 m (31 ft 9.9 in)
- Draft: 3.5 m (11 ft 5.8 in)
- Installed power: 3 du Temple boilers; 31,000 PS (22,800 kW; 30,576 shp)
- Propulsion: 2 shafts; 2 geared steam turbines
- Speed: 33 knots (61 km/h; 38 mph)
- Range: 3,000 nmi (5,600 km; 3,500 mi) at 15 knots (28 km/h; 17 mph)
- Crew: 9 officers, 153 crewmen (wartime)
- Armament: 4 × single 130 mm (5.1 in) guns; 1 × single 75 mm (3.0 in) AA gun; 2 × triple 550 mm (21.7 in) torpedo tubes; 2 chutes for 16 depth charges

Typhon was a Bourrasque-class destroyer (torpilleur d'escadre) built for the French Navy during the 1920s.

After France surrendered to Germany in June 1940 during World War II, Typhon served with the navy of Vichy France.

== Design and description ==
The Bourrasque class had an overall length of 105.6 meters (346 ft 5 in), a beam of 9.7 meters (31 ft 10 in), and a draft of 3.5 meters (11 ft 6 in). The ships displaced 1,320 metric tons (1,300 long tons) at (standard) load and 1,825 metric tons (1,796 long tons) at deep load. They were powered by two geared steam turbines, each driving one propeller shaft, using steam provided by three du Temple boilers. The turbines were designed to produce 31,000 metric horsepower (22,800 kW; 30,576 shp), which would propel the ship at 33 knots (61 km/h; 38 mph). The ships carried enough fuel oil to give them a range of 3,000 nautical miles (5,600 km; 3,500 mi) at 15 knots (28 km/h; 17 mph).

The main armament of the Bourrasque-class ships consisted of four Canon de 130 mm (5.1 in) Modèle 1919 guns in shielded single mounts, one superfiring pair each fore and aft of the superstructure. Their anti-aircraft (AA) armament consisted of a single Canon de 75 mm (3 in) Modèle 1924 gun. The ships carried two triple mounts of 550-millimeter (21.7 in) torpedo tubes amidships. A pair of depth charge chutes were built into their stern that housed a total of sixteen 200-kilogram (440 lb) depth charges.

== Construction and career ==
She was at Oran, French Algeria, as part of the 7th Destroyer Squadron of the Marine Nationale when the Allies invaded French North Africa in Operation Torch in November 1942. On 8 November 1942, Typhon engaged the British cutter HMS Hartland from very short distance, sinking her in the harbour in a matter of minutes, when the Allied vessel was in the process of landing American troops. Later in the morning, Typhon and her sister ships Tramontane and Tornade steamed away in an attempt to attack Allied naval forces at Arzew Bay. The destroyer squadron was met with heavy fire by the British cruiser HMS Aurora. Typhon launched all her six torpedoes at the cruiser to no avail; her sisters were repeatedly hit by 6in shells. Tramontane was sunk and Tornade ran aground, while Typhoon returned to port with half her ammunition expended and without torpedoes, all of them launched at Aurora to no avail. Tramontane's survivors were also aboard. Typhon confronted the Allies once again on 9 November, this time with her sister Epervier. The destroyer attack was beaten off by the British cruisers Jamaica and Aurora; Epervier was hit and beached herself, while Typhon sailed back to Oran, where she was eventually scuttled by her own crew on 9 November 1942.
