= French ship Typhon =

At least two ships of the French Navy have been named Typhon:

- French torpedo boat Typhon, a Cyclone-class torpedo boat launched in 1901.
- French destroyer Typhon, a Bourrasque-class destroyer launched in 1925 and scuttled in 1942.
