= French ship Tramontane =

At least two ships of the French Navy have been named Tramontane:

- French torpedo boat Tramontane, a Cyclone-class torpedo boat launched in 1901 and struck in 1920.
- French destroyer Tramontane, a Bourrasque-class destroyer launched in 1924 and sunk in 1942.
