= French ship Bourrasque =

At least two ships of the French Navy have been named Bourrasque:

- French torpedo boat Bourrasque, a Cyclone-class torpedo boat launched in 1901 and struck in 1921.
- French destroyer Bourrasque, a Bourrasque-class destroyer launched in 1925 and sunk in 1940.
