= French destroyer Chacal =

French lead ship of Chacal-class

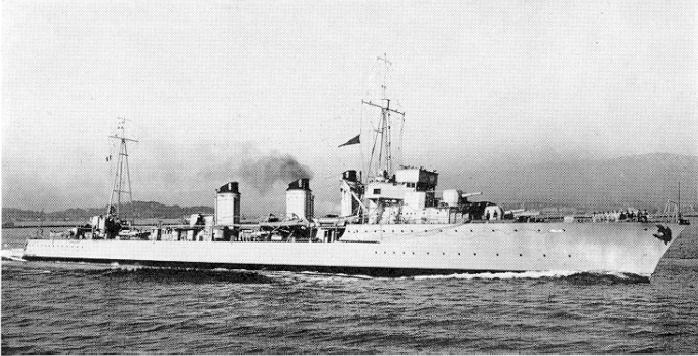
- Chacal before 1940

History

France
- Name: Chacal
- Namesake: Jackal
- Ordered: 26 February 1923
- Builder: Ateliers et Chantiers de Penhoët, Saint-Nazaire
- Laid down: 18 Sep 1923
- Launched: 27 September 1924
- Completed: 28 July 1926
- Commissioned: 1 May 1926
- In service: 23 December 1926
- Fate: Beached, 24 May 1940, near Boulogne-sur-Mer

General characteristics (as built)
- Class & type: Chacal-class destroyer
- Displacement: 2,126 t (2,092 long tons) (standard); 2,980–3,075 t (2,933–3,026 long tons) (full load)
- Length: 126.8 m (416 ft 0.1 in)
- Beam: 11.1 m (36 ft 5.0 in)
- Draft: 4.1 m (13 ft 5.4 in)
- Installed power: 50,000 PS (37,000 kW; 49,000 shp); 5 du Temple boilers
- Propulsion: 2 shafts; 2 geared steam turbines
- Speed: 35.5 knots (65.7 km/h; 40.9 mph)
- Range: 3,000 nmi (5,600 km; 3,500 mi) at 15 knots (28 km/h; 17 mph)
- Crew: 12 officers, 209 crewmen (wartime)
- Armament: 5 × single 130 mm (5.1 in) guns; 2 × single 75 mm (3.0 in) anti-aircraft guns; 2 × triple 550 mm (21.7 in) torpedo tubes; 2 chutes; four throwers for 46 depth charges

The French destroyer Chacal was the name ship of her class of destroyers (contre-torpilleur) built for the French Navy during the 1920s. Initially assigned to the Mediterranean Squadron, she spent most of the following decade as a training ship. The ship was assigned convoy escort duties in the Atlantic after the start of World War II in September 1939 until she was committed to the English Channel after the Battle of France began in May 1940. Chacal was crippled by German bombers and artillery on 23/24 May and had to beach herself near Boulogne-sur-Mer.

== Design and description ==
The Chacal-class ships were designed to counter the large Italian Leone-class destroyers. They had an overall length of 126.8 meters (416 ft 0 in), a beam of 11.1 meters (36 ft 5 in), and a draft of 4.1 meters (13 ft 5 in). The ships displaced 2,126 metric tons (2,092 long tons) at standard and 2,980–3,075 metric tons (2,933–3,026 long tons) at deep load. They were powered by two geared steam turbines, each driving one propeller shaft, using steam provided by five du Temple boilers. The turbines were designed to produce 50,000 metric horsepower (37,000 kW; 49,000 shp), which would propel the ship at 35.5 knots (65.7 km/h; 40.9 mph). During her sea trials on 18 May 1926, Chacal's turbines provided 54,911 metric horsepower (40,387 kW; 54,160 shp) and she reached 35.3 knots (65.4 km/h; 40.6 mph) for a single hour. The ships carried 530 metric tons (522 long tons) of fuel oil which gave them a range of 3,000 nautical miles (5,600 km; 3,500 mi) at 15 knots (28 km/h; 17 mph). Their crew consisted of 10 officers and 187 crewmen in peacetime and 12 officers and 209 enlisted men in wartime.

The main armament of the Chacal-class ships consisted of five Canon de 130 mm Modèle 1919 guns in single mounts, one superfiring pair fore and aft of the superstructure and the fifth gun abaft the aft funnel. The guns were numbered '1' to '5' from front to rear. Their anti-aircraft armament consisted of two Canon de 75 mm modèle 1924 guns in single mounts positioned amidships. The ships carried two above-water triple sets of 550-millimeter (21.7 in) torpedo tubes. A pair of depth charge chutes were built into their stern; these housed a total of twenty 200-kilogram (440 lb) depth charges. They were also fitted with four depth-charge throwers for which they carried a dozen 100-kilogram (220 lb) depth charges.

== Construction and career ==
Chacal, named after the jackal, was ordered on 26 February 1923 from the Ateliers et Chantiers de Penhoët. She was laid down on 18 September 1923 at their shipyard in Saint-Nazaire, launched on 27 September 1924, commissioned on 1 May 1926, completed on 28 July and entered service on 23 December. Completion was delayed by problems with her propulsion machinery and late deliveries by sub-contractors. Even before she was formally completed, she participated in two Baltic cruises in mid-1926 and made another cruise in the Eastern Atlantic in November–December. Chacal was assigned to the 1st Large Destroyer Division (1ère division de contre-torpeilleurs) (DCT) of the Mediterranean Squadron (renamed 5th Light Division (Division légère) (DL) of the First Squadron (1ère Escadre) on 1 February 1927) based at Toulon upon completion, together with her sister ships Panthère and Tigre. On 27 April 1927, the ship participated in a naval review by Gaston Doumergue, President of France, off Marseille. The following month, she was one of the ships that escorted Doumergue across the English Channel during his state visit to Britain in May–June 1927. The ship was present when he next reviewed the fleet on 3 July 1928 off Le Havre. On 9 October 1928, Chacal got underway from Toulon with Panthère and Tigre to search for the missing submarine Ondine.

Chacal and Tigre escorted the light cruiser Primauguet to French West Africa between 13 January and 10 April 1931. The four depth charge throwers were removed from Chacal in 1932 and the ship was briefly assigned to the 9th DL of the Torpedo Training School (Ecole d'application du lancement à la mer) at Toulon on 1 October until she was relieved of that assignment the following year. About a year later, the 75-millimeter guns were replaced by four twin mounts for 13.2-millimeter (0.5 in) anti-aircraft machineguns. On 15 July 1935, Chacal and her sister Léopard of the 8th DL were assigned to the Naval School (Ecole Navale) at Brest. On 12 April 1937, the 8th DL was redesignated as the 2nd DCT; their sister Jaguar joined them in September.

By 7 September 1939, Chacal was no longer a part of the 2nd DCT and was assigned to the Western Command (Forces maritimes de l'Ouest) for convoy escort duties from October to May 1940 where she guarded convoys traveling between Gibraltar and Brest as well as Casablanca, French Morocco, and Le Verdon-sur-Mer. In November, the ship had a British Type 123 ASDIC installed; in addition two depth-charge throwers were reinstalled, No. 3 gun removed, and her depth charge stowage reduced to a dozen 200 kg and eight 100 kg depth charges to improve her stability.

By 22 May Chacal was reassigned to the 2nd DCT when the unit was tasked to carry demolition teams to the northernmost French ports; the ship arrived at Calais that evening. Together with Léopard and eight smaller destroyers, Chacal bombarded advancing German troops as they approached the defenses of Boulogne-sur-Mer throughout the 23rd. During the night of 23–24 May, the ship was badly damaged by bombs from Heinkel He 111 bombers and shells from German artillery and had to be beached between Ambleteuse and Wimereux lest she sink.
