= French ship Mistral =

Four ships of the French Navy have borne the name Mistral after the wind mistral. An auxiliary ship has also borne the name.

== French ship named Mistral ==
- French torpedo boat Mistral (1901), an armoured Mistral-class torpedo boat
- French destroyer Mistral (1923), a Bourrasque-class destroyer.
- French cutter Mistral (1977), a Tourmaline-class cutter.
- French ship Mistral (L9013), an assault helicopter and command ship, lead ship of her class.
Ships of the French Navy named Mistral
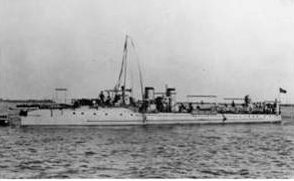
Portrait of Mistral (1901) by Marius Bar

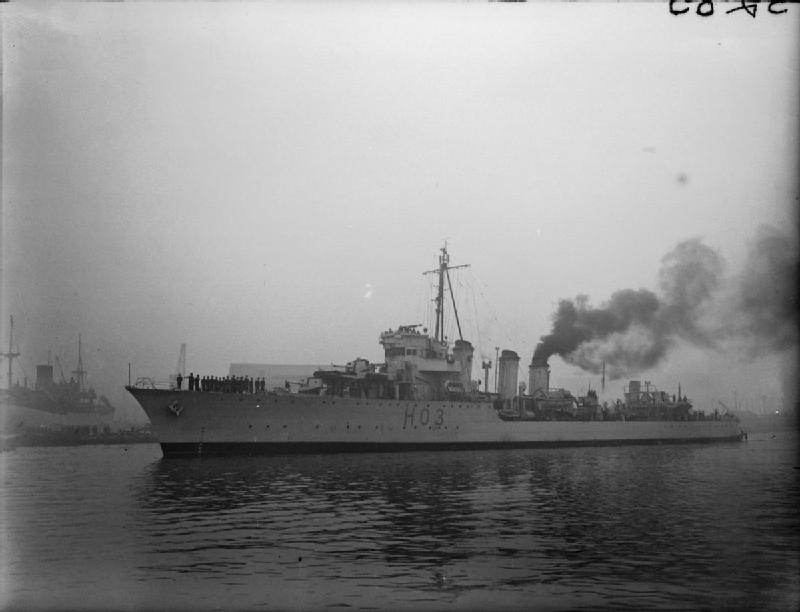
Mistral (1923) as HMS Mistral, before being handed over to the Free French Forces

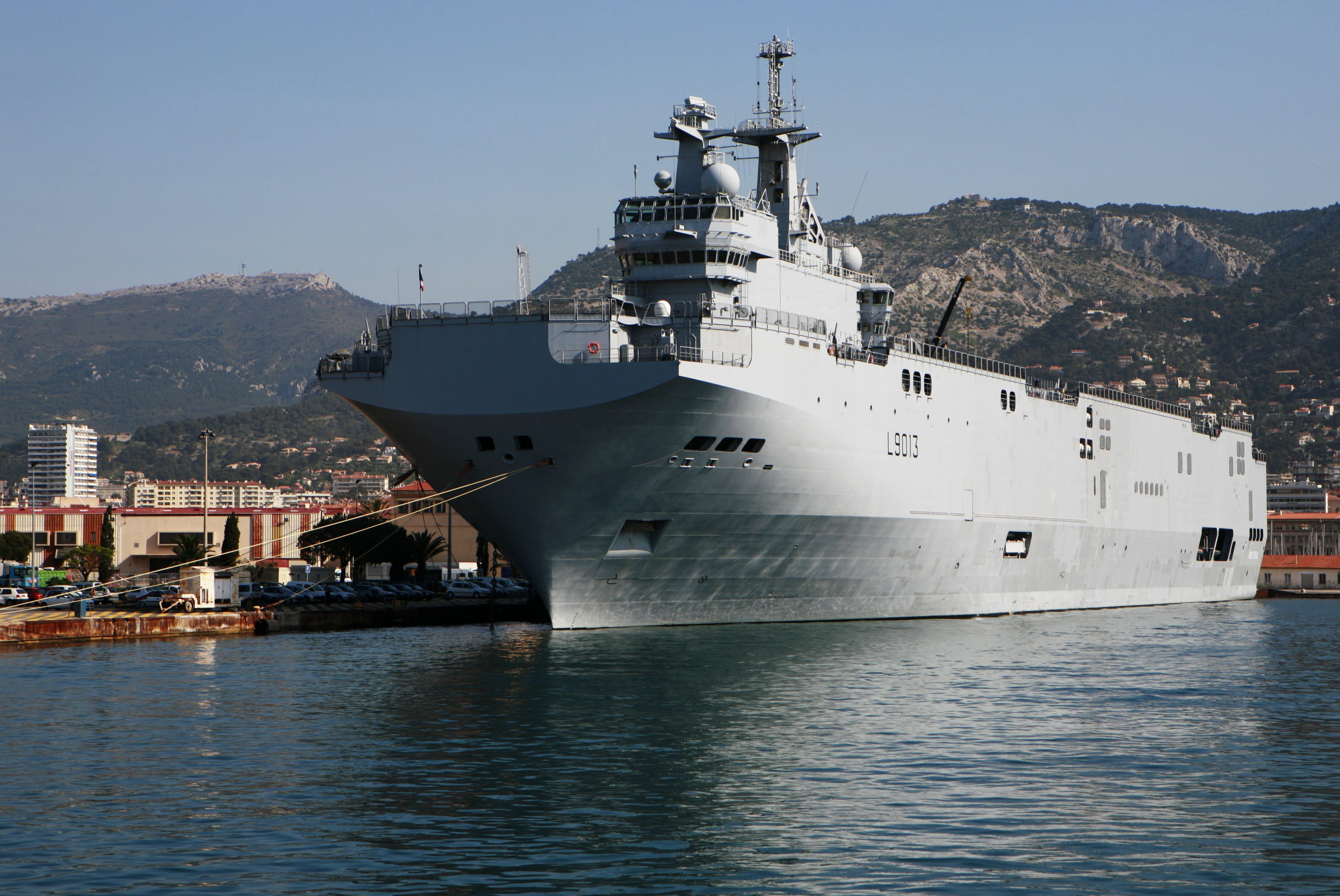
Mistral (L9013) in Toulon harbour

== Other ships ==
- Liane (DF 50), a service boat.
- A fishing ship, Henri Cameleyre (1908) was requisitioned as a minesweeper during the Second World War. She was restituted in 1941 and renamed Mistral.
- An auxiliary patrol boat of the Second World War also bore the name of Mistral II.

== Bibliography ==
- Roche, Jean-Michel (2005). Dictionnaire des bâtiments de la flotte de guerre française de Colbert à nos jours. Vol. 2. Group Retozel-Maury Millau. p. 347. ISBN 978-2-9525917-0-6. OCLC 165892922.
