= French destroyer Tramontane =

Destroyer of the French Navy

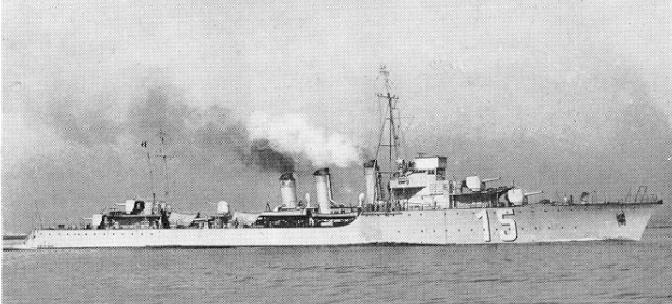
- Sister ship Ouragan underway before 1942

History

France
- Name: Tramontane
- Namesake: Tramontane
- Ordered: 5 March 1923
- Builder: Forges et Chantiers de la Gironde, Lormont
- Laid down: 29 June 1923
- Launched: 29 November 1924
- Completed: 15 October 1927
- Commissioned: 15 May 1927
- In service: 1 January 1928
- Fate: Lost 8 November 1942

General characteristics
- Class & type: Bourrasque-class destroyer
- Displacement: 1,320 t (1,300 long tons) (standard); 1,825 t (1,796 long tons) (full load)
- Length: 105.6 m (346 ft 5.5 in)
- Beam: 9.7 m (31 ft 9.9 in)
- Draft: 3.5 m (11 ft 5.8 in)
- Installed power: 31,000 PS (22,800 kW; 30,576 shp); 3 du Temple boilers
- Propulsion: 2 shafts; 2 geared steam turbines
- Speed: 33 knots (61 km/h; 38 mph)
- Range: 3,000 nmi (5,600 km; 3,500 mi) at 15 knots (28 km/h; 17 mph)
- Crew: 9 officers, 153 crewmen (wartime)
- Armament: 4 × single 130 mm (5.1 in) guns; 1 × single 75 mm (3.0 in) anti-aircraft guns; 2 × triple 550 mm (21.7 in) torpedo tubes; 2 chutes for 16 depth charges

Tramontane was a Bourrasque-class destroyer (torpilleur d'escadre) built for the French Navy during the 1920s.

After France surrendered to Germany in June 1940 during World War II, Tramontane served with the navy of Vichy France. She was at Oran, French Algeria, when the Allies invaded French North Africa in Operation Torch in November 1942. Resisting the invasion, she was badly damaged off Oran on 8 November 1942 by gunfire by the Royal Navy light cruiser HMS Aurora and destroyer HMS Calpe and was beached to avoid sinking.

== Design and description ==
The Bourrasque class had an overall length of 105.6 meters (346 ft 5 in), a beam of 9.7 meters (31 ft 10 in), and a draft of 3.5 meters (11 ft 6 in). The ships displaced 1,320 metric tons (1,300 long tons) at (standard) load and 1,825 metric tons (1,796 long tons) at deep load. They were powered by two geared steam turbines, each driving one propeller shaft, using steam provided by three du Temple boilers. The turbines were designed to produce 31,000 metric horsepower (22,800 kW; 30,576 shp), which would propel the ship at 33 knots (61 km/h; 38 mph). The ships carried enough fuel oil to give them a range of 3,000 nautical miles (5,600 km; 3,500 mi) at 15 knots (28 km/h; 17 mph).

The main armament of the Bourrasque-class ships consisted of four Canon de 130 mm (5.1 in) Modèle 1919 guns in shielded single mounts, one superfiring pair each fore and aft of the superstructure. Their anti-aircraft (AA) armament consisted of a single Canon de 75 mm (3 in) Modèle 1924 gun. The ships carried two triple mounts of 550-millimeter (21.7 in) torpedo tubes amidships. A pair of depth charge chutes were built into their stern that housed a total of sixteen 200-kilogram (440 lb) depth charges.
