= Orage =

Orage may refer to:

- Orage (film), a 1938 French-language film
- Orage (Liszt), a piano piece by Franz Liszt
- French destroyer Orage, a French naval destroyer that was sunk in the battle of Boulogne (1940)
- French landing platform dock Orage (L9022), a French naval landing ship (Ouragan-class landing platform dock) that served from 1968 to 2007
- Orage, a calendar application in the desktop environment Xfce

== People with the surname ==
- Alfred Richard Orage (1873–1934), British intellectual and editor of The New Age
