= HMS Aurora (12) =

1936 Arethusa-class cruiser

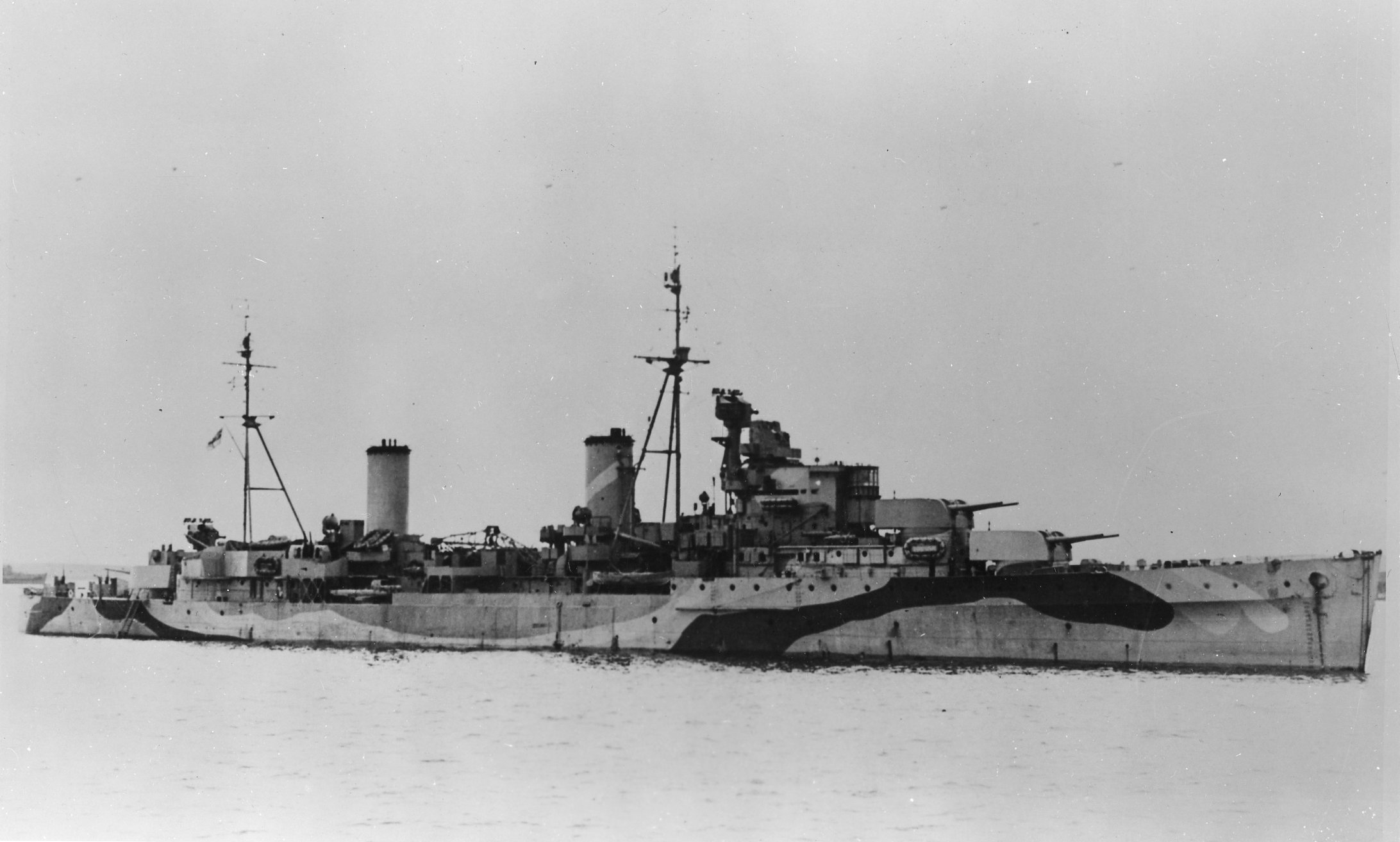
- Aurora, July 1942

History

United Kingdom
- Name: HMS Aurora
- Builder: Portsmouth Dockyard
- Laid down: 27 July 1935
- Launched: 20 August 1936
- Commissioned: 12 November 1937
- Decommissioned: April 1946
- Identification: Pennant number: 12
- Fate: Sold on 19 May 1948 to the Nationalist Chinese Navy

Republic of China
- Name: Chung King
- Namesake: Chongqing
- Acquired: 19 May 1948
- Fate: Defected to Communist China, 25 February 1949

People's Republic of China
- Name: Tchoung King
- Acquired: February 1949
- Renamed: Huang He (1959); Pei Ching (1965); Kuang Chou
- Fate: Sunk by ROC aircraft, March 1949. Later refloated and converted for other purposes. Scrapped during Cultural Revolution

General characteristics
- Class & type: Arethusa-class light cruiser
- Displacement: 5,220 tons standard load; 6,665 tons full load
- Length: 506 ft (154 m)
- Beam: 51 ft (16 m)
- Draught: 14 ft (4.3 m)
- Propulsion: Four Parsons geared steam turbines; Four Admiralty 3-drum oil-fired boilers; Four shafts; 64,000 shp
- Speed: 32 knots (59 km/h)
- Range: Unknown; 1,325 tons fuel oil
- Complement: 500
- Armament: Original configuration: 6 × BL 6-inch (152 mm) guns; 4 × QF 4-inch (102 mm) single Mk V AA guns; 2 × 0.5-inch (12.7 mm) quadruple machine guns; 2 × 21-inch (533 mm) torpedo tubes (triple mount); April 1941 configuration: 3 × 6-inch (152 mm) dual guns; 2 × 2-pounder (40 mm) pom-pom quad AA guns; 3 × 20 mm Oerlikon single AA guns; 2 × 0.5-inch quadruple machine guns; 2 × 21-inch (533 mm) triple torpedo tubes.; December 1943 configuration: 3 × 6-inch (152 mm) dual guns; 2 × 40 mm Bofors quad AA guns; 4 × 20 mm Oerlikon dual power-operated AA guns; 3 × 20 mm Oerlikon single AA guns; 2 × 0.5-inch quadruple machine guns; 2 × 21-inch (533 mm) triple torpedo tubes
- Armour: Original configuration: 1 to 3 inches – magazine protection; 2.25 inches – belt; 1 inches – deck, turrets and bulkheads
- Aircraft carried: One aircraft (later removed)

HMS Aurora was an Arethusa-class light cruiser of the Royal Navy. She was built by Portsmouth Dockyard, with the keel being laid down on 27 July 1935. She was launched on 20 August 1936, and commissioned 12 November 1937.

In 1948 it was given to the Nationalist government in China and served as the flagship of the Republic of China Navy, being renamed Chongqing. In February 1949 its crew mutinied and defected to the Communists.

== History ==
Aurora served with the Home Fleet from completion as Rear Admiral (D). In September 1939 she was with the 2nd Cruiser Squadron, escorting convoys to Scandinavia and engaged in the hunt for the German battleships Scharnhorst and Gneisenau. From October 1940 she was commanded by Captain William Gladstone Agnew. After the Norwegian Campaign she participated in the operations hunting the German battleship Bismarck and, with the cruiser Kenya, intercepted one of the German supply ships, Belchen, on 3 June 1941.

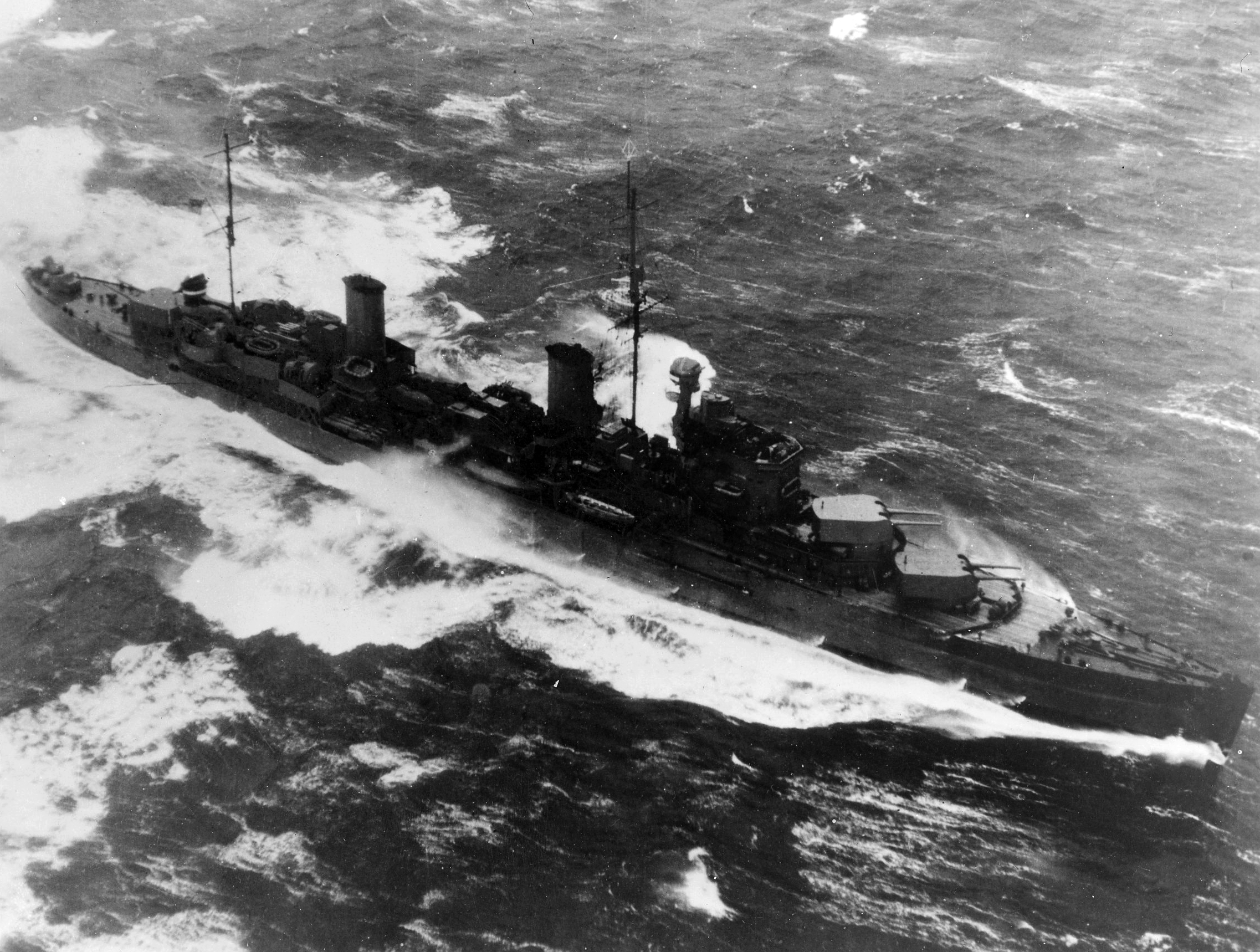
Aurora in the North Atlantic, 1940

Between July and August 1941, as part of Force K with the Home Fleet, she was involved in operations to Spitzbergen and Bear Island (Operation Gauntlet). After one of these sorties, in company with the cruiser Nigeria, she intercepted a German troop convoy off Northern Norway, and the German Bremse was sunk. In the autumn she was transferred to the Mediterranean and arrived in Malta on 21 October 1941 to join a new Force K.

On 9 November 1941 leading Force K, consisting of HMS Penelope, HMS Lance and HMS Lively, she was involved in Battle of the Duisburg Convoy. The Italian destroyer Fulmine was sunk, as well as the German transports Duisburg and San Marco, the Italian transports Maria, Sagitta and Rina Corrado, and the Italian Conte di Misurata and Minatitlan. The Italian destroyers Grecale and Euro were damaged.

On 24 November Force K, made up of the British light cruisers Aurora and Penelope and the destroyers Lance and Lively, intercepted an Axis convoy about 100 nautical miles west of Crete. The Axis convoy was bound from the Aegean to Benghazi. The two German transports in the convoy, Maritza and Procida were sunk by Penelope and Lively despite the presence of the Italian torpedo boats Lupo and Cassiopea. On 1 December 1941 Force K with Penelope and Lively attacked the Mantovani Convoy. The Italian destroyer Alvise Da Mosto and the sole cargo ship Mantovani were sunk.

HMS Aurora also participated in the First Battle of Sirte on 17 December 1941. On 19 December while steaming off Tripoli she was severely damaged in a minefield and was forced to retire to Malta.

After her return to the Mediterranean she joined Force H, and in November was part of the Centre Task Force for the Landings in North Africa, Operation Torch. Off Oran, she engaged the Vichy French destroyers Tramontane and Tornade on 8 November 1942, sinking the latter and damaging the former so badly that she had to be beached. The following day she badly damaged the destroyer Épervier and drove her ashore. By December she was operating as part of Force Q at Bône against the Axis evacuation and supply convoys between Trapani and Tunis.

Then, as a unit of the 15th Cruiser Squadron, she participated in the Allied invasion of Sicily and the Salerno landings (Operation Avalanche) before moving into the Aegean in October 1943. While escorting British destroyers reinforcing troops on the island of Leros on 30 October, she was attacked by German Junkers Ju 87 and Ju 88 aircraft off Castellorizo, suffering a 500 kg (1,100 lb) bomb hit abaft the after funnel. The explosion and subsequent fire killed 47 crew. Aurora was forced to withdraw to Taranto for repairs which lasted until April 1944. In August 1944 she was at the Operation Dragoon landings in the south of France, then returned to the Aegean, where she assisted in the liberation of Athens. One notable member of crew was the actor Kenneth More, who used his theatre skills in his role as 'action broadcaster' to describe to the crew below decks via the public address system what was happening when the ship was in action.

=== Chinese service ===
After the war Aurora was sold on 19 May 1948 to the Chinese Navy as compensation for six Chinese custom patrol ships and one cargo ship that the British seized in Hong Kong and lost during the war. She was renamed Chung King, after the Chinese war time capital of Chung King (Chongqing), and became the flagship of the Republic of China Navy under the command of Captain Deng Zhaoxiang. Chiang Kai-shek spent time on the ship observing the worsening military situation at some points.

=== Mutiny and Communist service ===
The crew was not content after not having been paid since December 1948, when the ship was assigned to guard $500,000 in silver dollars, and planned a mutiny for weeks. On 24 February 1949 the mutineers found out that their plan had been discovered, opened the small arms locker, and took over the ship. They forced the captain to the bridge, and threatened to blow up the ship if he didn't get the ship underway. At 03:00 on 25 February, Captain Deng relented, and set sail with darkened lights. After announcing to the full crew that they intended to defect to the Communists with the ship, an anti-revolution group formed and threatened to retake the ship. The ship arrived at Yantai and the silver was distributed amongst the crew, staving off the counter-rebellion. Once in Yantai, local Communist authorities were needed to put down the counter-rebellion. The ship moved to Huludao Harbor after being spotted by Nationalist reconnaissance aircraft, and on 21 March 1949 she was sunk in Huludao harbour by Nationalist aircraft. She was later salvaged with Soviet assistance but then stripped bare as "repayment". The original engines were sent to the Shanghai Department of Electricity, and were replaced with engines from the scuttled coastal defence ship Hai Yung.

The PLAN considered refitting the ship along the lines of the Anshan-class destroyers they had received, with an armament of four B-2LM turrets and eight twin 57 mm, but these plans were still too expensive, so the empty hulk spent the rest of her life as an accommodation and warehouse ship, being subsequently renamed Huang He (Yellow River) in 1959, when it was transferred to Shanghai on 27 October of that year to be converted to a salvage ship at a planned budget of 3 million ¥. After spending 276,000 ¥, the conversion project was cancelled, and the ship was once again transferred, this time to Tianjin in June 1965, used as a barracks ship and renamed Pei Ching. She was scrapped at some point during the Cultural Revolution. Her name tablet and ship's bell were preserved in the Military Museum of the Chinese People's Revolution.

== Commanding officers ==
- L. H. K. Hamilton
- William Gladstone Agnew
- Robert Sherbrooke
- Deng Zhaoxiang
