= French destroyer Ouragan =

Bourrasque-class destroyer of the French Navy

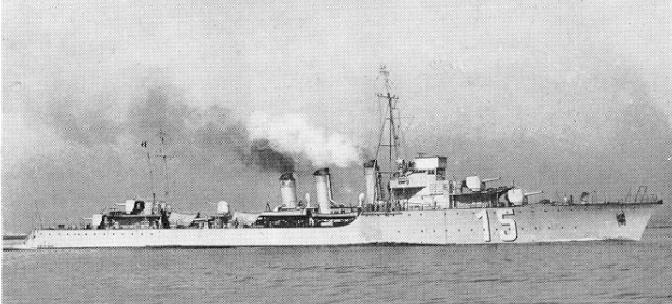
- Ouragan

History

France
- Name: Ouragan
- Namesake: Hurricane
- Ordered: 13 March 1923
- Builder: Chantiers Navals Français, Caen
- Laid down: 7 September 1923
- Launched: 6 December 1924
- Completed: 19 January 1927
- Decommissioned: 3 July 1940
- In service: 15 September 1927
- Fate: Loaned to Poland

Poland
- Name: Ouragan
- Commissioned: 17 July 1940
- Decommissioned: 30 April 1941
- Fate: Returned to the Free French, 30 April 1941

Free France
- Name: Ouragan
- Commissioned: 30 April 1941
- Decommissioned: 1943
- Fate: Scrapped, 1949

General characteristics
- Class & type: Bourrasque-class destroyer
- Displacement: 1,320 t (1,300 long tons) (standard); 1,825 t (1,796 long tons) (full load)
- Length: 105.6 m (346 ft 5.5 in)
- Beam: 9.7 m (31 ft 9.9 in)
- Draft: 3.5 m (11 ft 5.8 in)
- Installed power: 31,000 PS (22,800 kW; 30,576 shp); 3 du Temple boilers
- Propulsion: 2 shafts; 2 geared steam turbines
- Speed: 33 knots (61 km/h; 38 mph)
- Range: 3,000 nmi (5,600 km; 3,500 mi) at 15 knots (28 km/h; 17 mph)
- Crew: 9 officers, 153 crewmen (wartime)
- Armament: 4 × single 130 mm (5.1 in) guns; 1 × single 75 mm (3 in) anti-aircraft guns; 2 × triple 550 mm (21.7 in) torpedo tubes; 2 chutes for 16 depth charges

Ouragan (French: "hurricane") was a Bourrasque-class destroyer (torpilleur d'escadre) built for the French Navy during the 1920s. During World War II, the destroyer began the war in service with the French Navy and was undergoing repairs at Brest during the invasion of France. The British Royal Navy towed the destroyer to the United Kingdom and commandeered the vessel following the French surrender in 1940. They transferred Ouragan to the Polish Navy which kept the destroyer in service for less than a year. In 1941, the Polish Navy transferred the destroyer to the Free French Naval Forces, which in turn, transferred Ouragan back to the Royal Navy in 1943. Ouragan saw no further action and was broken up for scrap in 1949.

== Design and description ==
The Bourrasque class had an overall length of 105.6 meters (346 ft 5 in), a beam of 9.7 meters (31 ft 10 in), and a draft of 3.5 meters (11 ft 6 in). The ships displaced 1,320 metric tons (1,300 long tons) at (standard) load and 1,825 metric tons (1,796 long tons) at deep load. They were powered by two geared steam turbines, each driving one propeller shaft, using steam provided by three du Temple boilers. The turbines were designed to produce 31,000 metric horsepower (22,800 kW; 30,576 shp), which would propel the ship at 33 knots (61 km/h; 38 mph). The ships carried enough fuel oil to give them a range of 3,000 nautical miles (5,600 km; 3,500 mi) at 15 knots (28 km/h; 17 mph).

The main armament of the Bourrasque-class ships consisted of four Canon de 130 mm (5.1 in) Modèle 1919 guns in shielded single mounts, one superfiring pair each fore and aft of the superstructure. Their anti-aircraft (AA) armament consisted of a single Canon de 75 mm (3 in) Modèle 1924 gun. The ships carried two triple mounts of 550-millimeter (21.7 in) torpedo tubes amidships. A pair of depth charge chutes were built into their stern that housed a total of sixteen 200-kilogram (440 lb) depth charges.

== Construction and career ==
During the first year of World War II, Ouragan served with the 4th Destroyer Division with the destroyers Bourrasque and Orage, based at Brest. At the time of the German invasion of France in 1940, she was undergoing engine repairs at Brest. The Royal Navy towed her to Devonport where the repairs were completed. After the French surrender in June, the British commandeered her on 3 July and she was transferred to the Polish Navy on 17 July 1940. Until 30 April 1941 she sailed under the Polish ensign (using pennant number H16) but as OF Ouragan (OF - Okręt Francuski - "French ship"), instead of the usual ORP prefix. She was commanded by Lieutenant Commander T. Gorazdowski; most of Ouragan's crew were transferred from Grom, which had been sunk on 4 May 1940, during the Battle of Narvik.

Ouragan participated in operations around the British Isles, during which she suffered storm damage (flooded engine and boiler rooms) and a series of debilitating technical problems, requiring a total of 194 days under repair (compared to 31 days at sea). On 30 April 1941, after 287 days in Polish service, Ouragan was returned to the Free French Forces, who in turn passed her to the Royal Navy in 1943. It was proposed to use the ship in the St Nazaire Raid, however this was rejected as using a French ship would involve using the Free French forces and increase the number of people aware of the raid, and HMS Campbeltown was used instead. The ship never returned to active operations, was decommissioned on 7 April 1949 and scrapped.
