= Bourrasque-class destroyer =

Class of French Navy destroyers

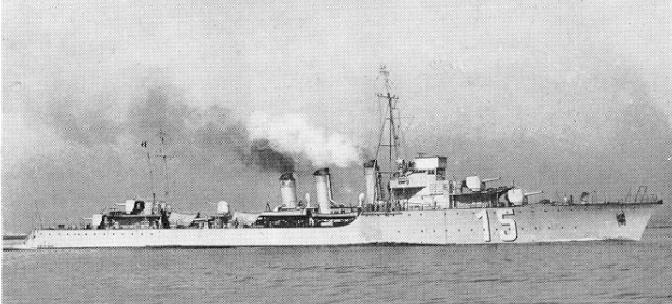
- Ouragan

Class overview
- Name: Bourrasque
- Operators: French Navy; Free French Naval Forces; Polish Navy; Royal Navy
- Preceded by: Enseigne Gabolde
- Succeeded by: Adroit class
- Completed: 12

General characteristics
- Type: Destroyer
- Displacement: 1,298 long tons (1,319 t) (standard); 1,968 long tons (2,000 t) (full load)
- Length: 106 m (347 ft 9 in)
- Beam: 9.64 m (31 ft 8 in)
- Draught: 4.3 m (14 ft 1 in)
- Propulsion: 3 boilers; Geared turbines; 31,000 shp (23,117 kW); 2 shafts
- Speed: 33 knots (61 km/h; 38 mph)
- Range: 2,150 nmi (3,980 km; 2,470 mi) at 14 kn (26 km/h; 16 mph)
- Complement: 7 officers, 138 men
- Armament: 4 × 130 mm (5.1 in) guns; 2 × single 37 mm (1.5 in) AA guns; 4 × single 13.2 mm (0.52 in) AA guns; 2 × triple 550 mm (21.7 in) torpedo tubes

The Bourrasque class was a group of twelve French Navy destroyers (torpilleur) laid down in 1923 and in service from 1926 to 1950. Along with the heavier Chacal class, they were part of a plan to modernise the French fleet after the First World War. The Bourrasques were smaller and slower than the Chacals, but were nonetheless comparable with the British W class. The class saw varied service in the Second World War, in five different navies, on both sides. These ships were named after types of wind.

The design was used as the basis for the two Wicher-class destroyers built for the Polish Navy during the late 1920s.

== Design and description ==
The Bourrasque class had an overall length of 105.6 meters (346 ft 5 in), a beam of 9.7 meters (31 ft 10 in), and a draft of 3.5 meters (11 ft 6 in). The ships displaced 1,320 metric tons (1,300 long tons) at (standard) load and 1,825 metric tons (1,796 long tons) at deep load. They were powered by two geared steam turbines, each driving one propeller shaft, using steam provided by three du Temple boilers. The turbines were designed to produce 31,000 metric horsepower (22,800 kW; 30,576 shp), which would propel the ship at 33 knots (61 km/h; 38 mph). The ships carried enough fuel oil to give them a range of 3,000 nautical miles (5,600 km; 3,500 mi) at 15 knots (28 km/h; 17 mph).

The main armament of the Bourrasque-class ships consisted of four Canon de 130 mm (5.1 in) Modèle 1919 guns in shielded single mounts, one superfiring pair each fore and aft of the superstructure. Their anti-aircraft (AA) armament consisted of a single Canon de 75 mm (3 in) Modèle 1924 gun. The ships carried two triple mounts of 550-millimeter (21.7 in) torpedo tubes amidships. A pair of depth charge chutes were built into their stern that housed a total of sixteen 200-kilogram (440 lb) depth charges.

== Ships ==
Construction details
Ship name	Builder	Laid down	Launched	Comm.	Completed	In service	Fate
Bourrasque	Ateliers et Chantiers de France, Dunkirk	12 Nov 1923	5 Aug 1925		23 Sep 1926	23 Sep 1926	Mined and lost off Nieuwpoort during Operation Dynamo, 30 May 1940
Cyclone	Forges et Chantiers de la Méditerranée, Le Havre	29 Sep 1923	24 Jan 1925	15 Mar 1927	31 May 1927	25 Jun 1928	Damaged by E-boat S-24 30 May 1940; scuttled at Brest 18 Jun 1940
Mistral	Forges et Chantiers de la Méditerranée, Le Havre	28 Nov 1923	6 Jun 1925	5 Apr 1927	1 Jun 1927	21 Jan 1928	Constructive total loss 10 Jun 1944; decommissioned 17 Feb 1950
Orage	Chantiers Navals Français, Caen	20 Aug 1923	30 Aug 1924	1 Oct 1926	1 Sep 1926	19 Jan 1927	Sunk 23 May 1940
Ouragan	Chantiers Navals Français, Caen	7 Sep 1923	6 Dec 1924	19 Jan 1927		15 Sep 1927	Loaned to Poland; decommissioned 3 Jul 1940
Simoun	Ateliers et Chantiers de St Nazaire-Penhoet, St. Nazaire	8 Aug 1923	3 Jun 1924	1 Jan 1926	29 Apr 1926	Aug 1926	Decommissioned 17 Feb 1950; scrapped 1950
Siroco	Ateliers et Chantiers de St Nazaire-Penhoet, St. Nazaire	15 Mar 1924	3 Oct 1925		1 Jul 1927	5 Feb 1928	Sunk by the E-boats S-23 and S-26 during Operation Dynamo, 31 May 1940
Tempête	Ateliers et Chantiers Dubigeon, Nantes	3 Dec 1923	21 Feb 1925	20 Jul 1926	28 Sep 1926	Sep 1926	Decommissioned, scrapped 1950
Tornade	Dyle et Bacalan, Bordeaux	25 Apr 1923	12 Mar 1925	1 Oct 1927	10 May 1928	21 May 1928	Sunk 8 Nov 1942
Tramontane	Forges et Chantiers de la Gironde, Bordeaux	29 Jun 1923	29 Nov 1924	15 May 1927	15 Oct 1927	1 Jan 1928	Lost 8 Nov 1942
Trombe	Forges et Chantiers de la Gironde, Bordeaux	5 Mar 1924	27 Dec 1925	1 Jun 1927	27 Oct 1927	21 Dec 1927	Scuttled 27 Nov 1942; decommissioned 17 Feb 1950
Typhon	Forges et Chantiers de la Gironde, Bordeaux	1 Sep 1923	22 May 1925	15 Feb 1928	27 Jun 1928	22 Oct 1928	Scuttled 9 Nov 1942

== Service ==
Four ships of the class - Bourrasque, Cyclone, Orage and Sirocco - were lost in 1940; Orage on 23 May, sunk by German bombers; Bourasque by German mines and artillery fire on 30 May while evacuating troops from Dunkirk; Sirocco on 31 May, to German torpedo boats while engaged in the same operation; and Cyclone, having been badly damaged on 30 May by torpedo boats was scuttled at Brest on 18 June to prevent her capture.

Mistral and Ouragan were captured by the British in Plymouth harbour on 3 July 1940 during Operation Catapult. Both were eventually transferred to the Free French. Somewhat circuitously, Ouragan was first transferred to the Free Polish Navy. Both survived the war.

Tornade and Tramontaine were lost in the same engagement off Oran on 8 November 1942, against allied units protecting Operation Torch. Typhon was scuttled in Oran harbour to stop her being acquired by the Allies.

Simoun and Tempête, based at Casablanca, joined the Allies in November 1942. They may have joined the battleship Jean Bart in engaging the Allied 'Covering Group', a taskforce based on the battleship Massachusetts.

Trombe was the only ship of the class to be scuttled at Toulon in November 1942 alongside much of the French Navy. She was later raised, commissioned into the Italian Navy as FR31, and then re-transferred to the Free French on 28 October 1943. This destroyer was crippled (constructive total loss) by a fascist Italian MTM explosive motorboat on 17 April 1945 in the Gulf of Genoa.

Bourrasque class
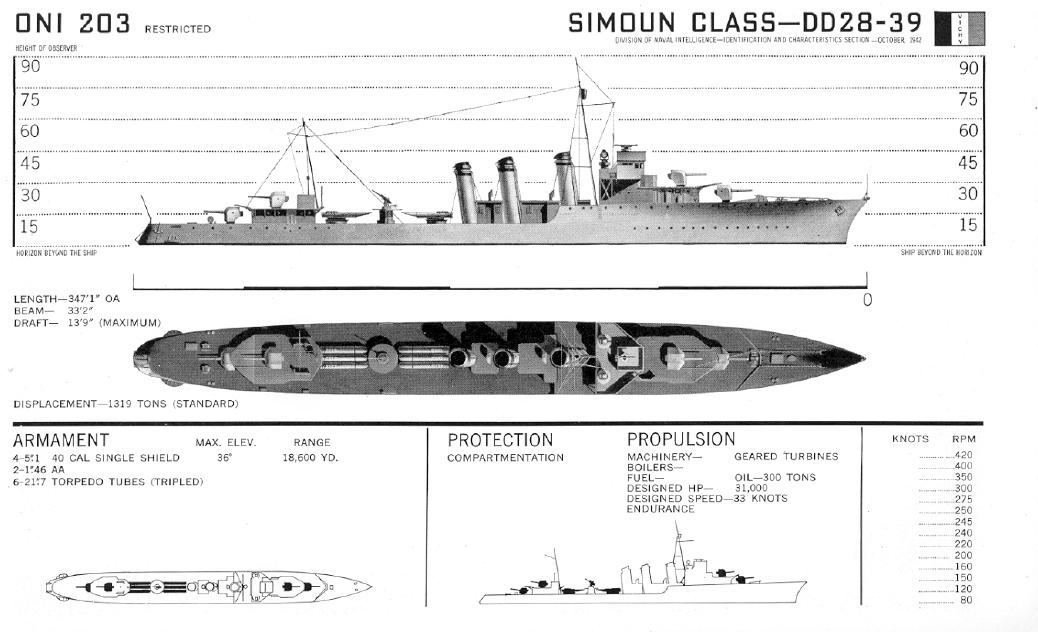
Plan and specifications

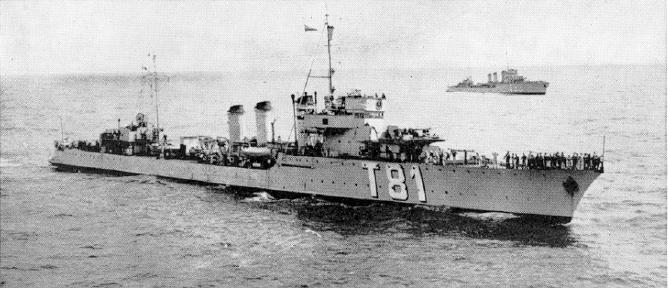
Bourrasque-class destroyer (T81)

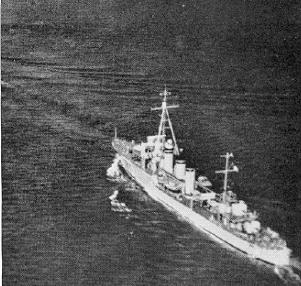
Bourrasque-class destroyer
