= Canon de 130 mm Modèle 1919 =

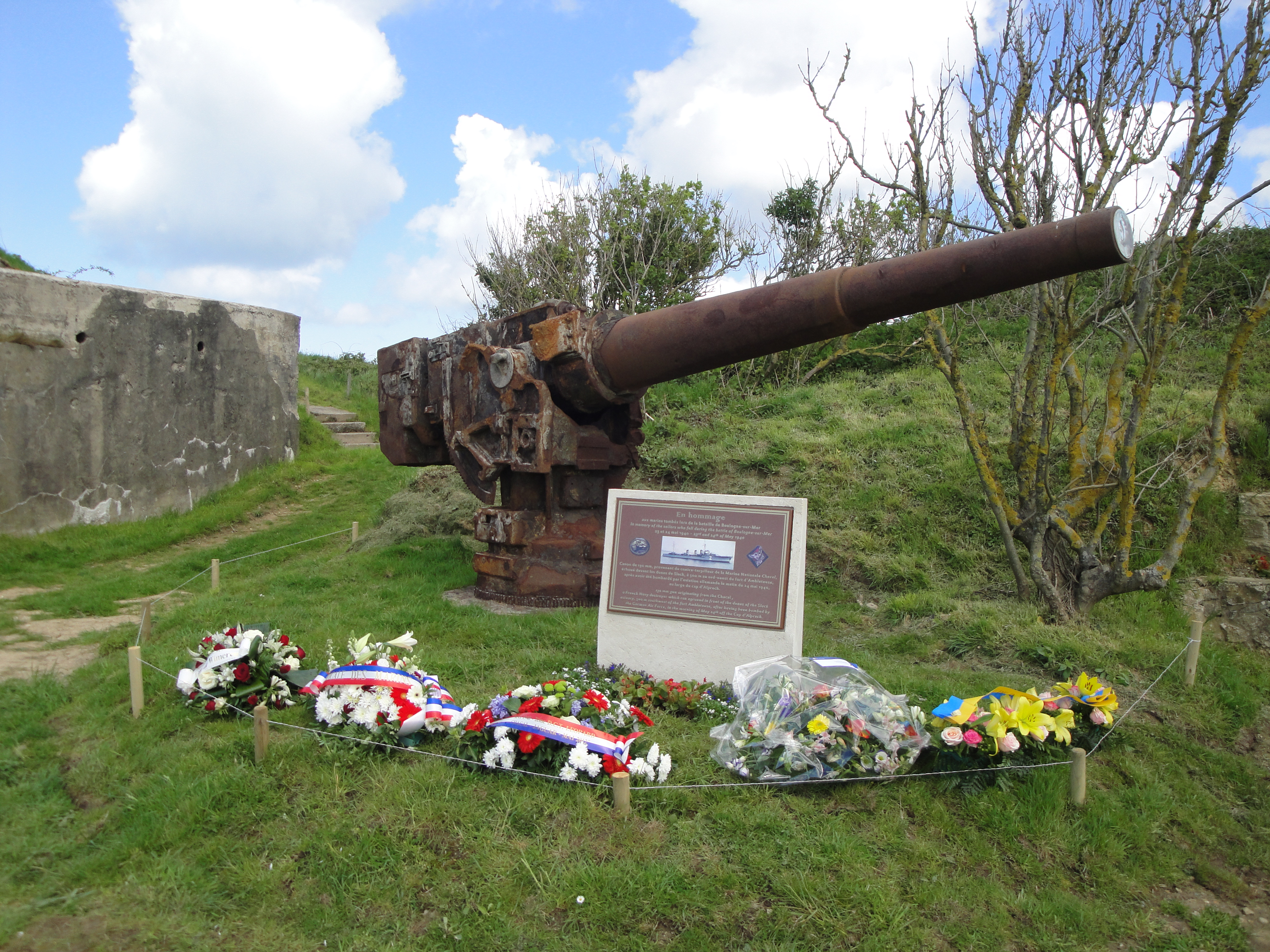
- Type: Naval gun
- Place of origin: France

Service history
- In service: World War II
- Used by: France
- Wars: World War II

Production history
- Designed: 1919

Specifications
- Mass: 3.35 metric tons
- Barrel length: 5.2 meters (17 ft) 40 caliber
- Shell: 130x674mm R Separate loading QF
- Shell weight: 35 kilograms (77 lb)
- Caliber: 130 millimeters (5.1 in)
- Breech: Welin breech block
- Elevation: -10° to +36°
- Rate of fire: 4-5 rpm
- Muzzle velocity: 725 meters per second (2,380 ft/s)
- Maximum firing range: 18,900 meters (20,700 yd) at 36°

The Canon de 130 mm Modèle 1919 was a medium-caliber naval gun used as the primary armament on a number of French destroyers during World War II.

== Description ==
The Canon de 130 mm Modèle 1919 was a built up construction with a Welin breech block. These guns were carried in low-angle single turrets on destroyers.

== Ammunition ==
Ammunition was of Separate loading QF ammunition type. The cartridge case was 674 millimetres (26.5 in) and with a 7.73 kilograms (17.0 lb) propellant charge weighed 17.5 kilograms (39 lb).

The gun was able to fire:

- Semi Armour-Piercing - 32 kg (71 lb)
- High Explosive - 34.85 kg (76.8 lb)
- Illumination - Unknown

== Naval Service ==
Ship classes that carried the Canon de 130 mm Modèle 1919 include:

- Bourrasque-class destroyers
- Chacal-class destroyers
