= Canon de 75 mm modèle 1924 =

French naval anti-aircraft gun

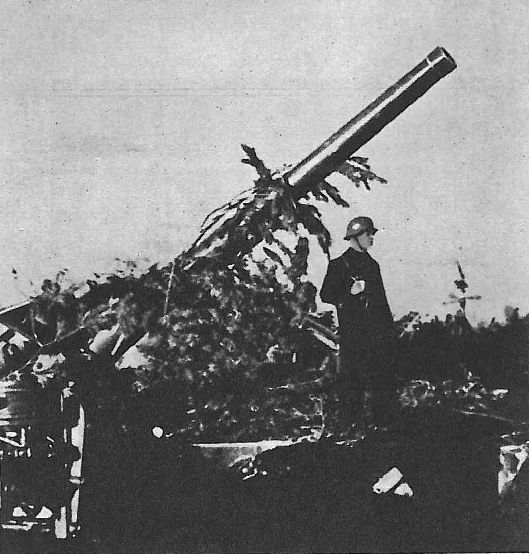
- A Canon de 75 mm modèle 1924 in Hel, Poland.
- Type: Anti-aircraft gun
- Place of origin: France

Service history
- In service: 1925–1945
- Used by: France; Poland; Nazi Germany
- Wars: World War II

Specifications
- Mass: 1,070 kg (2,360 lb)
- Barrel length: 3.75 m (148 in) (bore length)
- Shell: Fixed
- Shell weight: 5.93 kg (13.1 lb)
- Caliber: 75 mm (3.0 in)
- Elevation: -10° to +90°
- Rate of fire: Practical: 8–12 rpm
- Muzzle velocity: 850 m/s (2,800 ft/s)
- Effective firing range: Horizontal: 14,100 m (15,400 yd) @ 40° Vertical: 10,000 m (11,000 yd) @ 90°

The Canon de 75 mm modèle 1924 was a French naval anti-aircraft gun designed after World War I. It served aboard battleships, cruisers and destroyers during World War II. In Polish service it was known as the 75 mm Armata przeciwlotnicza wz.1922/1924. In German service it was known as the 7.5 cm Flak M.22-24 (f) and was used to arm Germany's Atlantic Wall fortifications.

== Naval Service ==
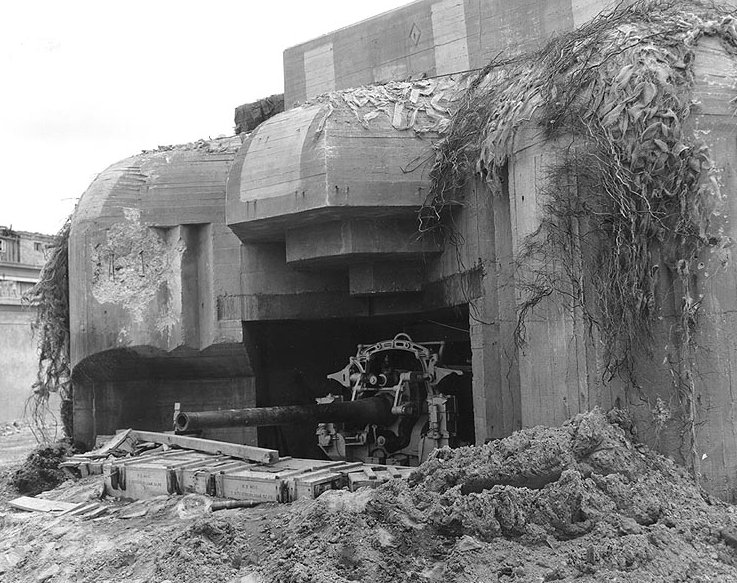
Bunker 649 N ° III in Cherbourg, Manche, France.

Ship classes that carried the Canon de 75 mm modèle 1924 include:

- Bretagne-class
- Chacal-class
- Duguay-Trouin-class
- Duquesne-class

== Bibliography ==
- Campbell, John (1985). Naval Weapons of World War II. Annapolis, Maryland: Naval Institute Press. ISBN 0-87021-459-4.
- Jordan, John & Moulin, Jean (2015). French Destroyers: Torpilleurs d'Escadre & Contre-Torpilleurs 1922–1956. Barnsley, UK: Seaforth Publishing. ISBN 978-1-84832-198-4.
