= French destroyer Panthère =

Chacal-class destroyer

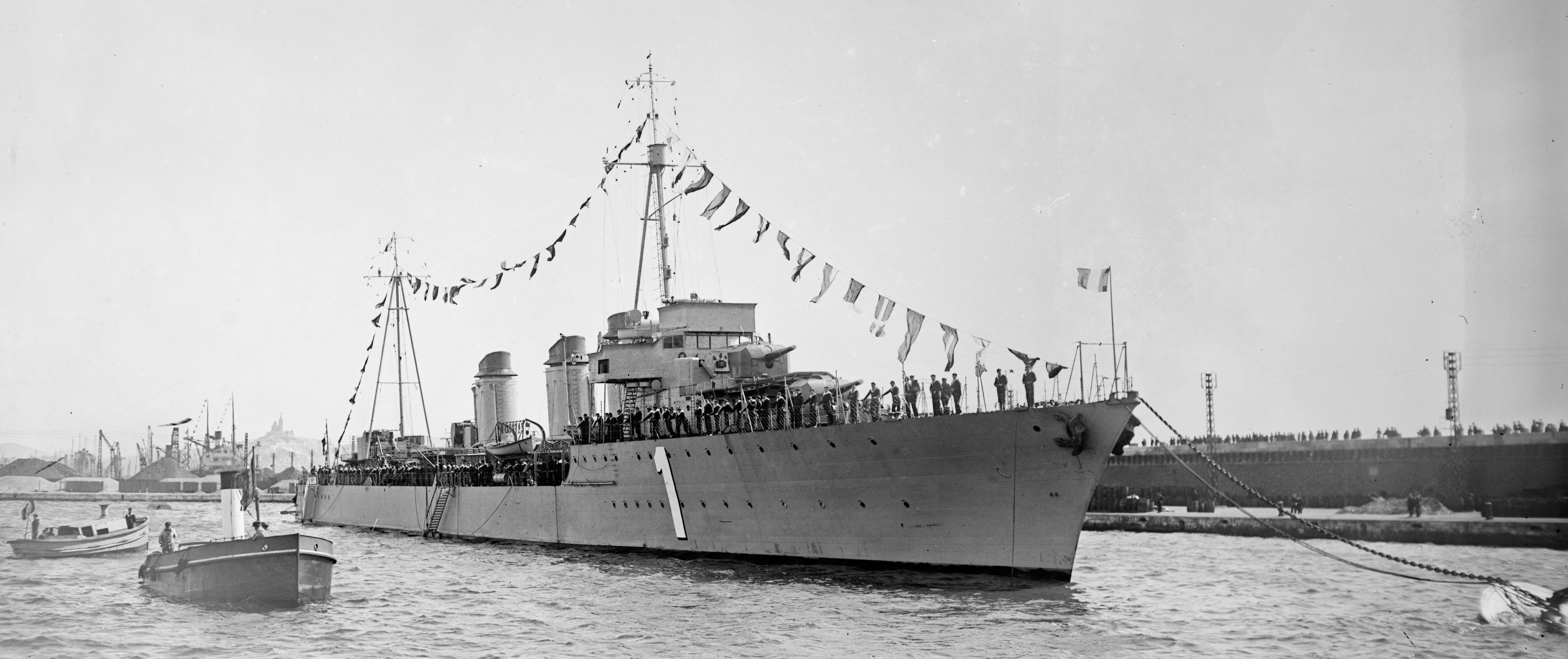
- Panthère in Marseille, April 1927

History

France
- Name: Panthère
- Namesake: Panther
- Ordered: 18 April 1922
- Builder: Arsenal de Lorient
- Way number: No. 7
- Laid down: 23 December 1923
- Launched: 27 October 1924
- Completed: 4 January 1927
- Commissioned: 1 November 1926
- Decommissioned: July 1940
- In service: 4 February 1927
- Captured: 27 November 1942

Kingdom of Italy
- Name: FR 22
- Acquired: After 27 November 1942
- Commissioned: 19 January 1943
- Fate: Scuttled and later scrapped, 9 September 1943

General characteristics (as built)
- Class & type: Chacal-class destroyer
- Displacement: 2,126 t (2,092 long tons) (standard); 2,980–3,075 t (2,933–3,026 long tons) (full load)
- Length: 126.8 m (416 ft 0.1 in)
- Beam: 11.1 m (36 ft 5.0 in)
- Draft: 4.1 m (13 ft 5.4 in)
- Installed power: 50,000 PS (37,000 kW; 49,000 shp); 5 du Temple boilers
- Propulsion: 2 shafts; 2 geared steam turbines
- Speed: 35.5 knots (65.7 km/h; 40.9 mph)
- Range: 3,000 nmi (5,600 km; 3,500 mi) at 15 knots (28 km/h; 17 mph)
- Crew: 12 officers, 209 crewmen (wartime)
- Armament: 5 × single 130 mm (5.1 in) guns; 2 × single 75 mm (3.0 in) anti-aircraft guns; 2 × triple 550 mm (21.7 in) torpedo tubes; 2 chutes; four throwers for 46 depth charges

The French destroyer Panthère was a Chacal-class destroyer built for the French Navy during the 1920s. Aside from cruises to the English Channel and the French West Indies, she spent her entire career in the Mediterranean Sea. The ship was assigned to the Torpedo School at Toulon in 1932 and remained there until World War II began in September 1939. She was then assigned convoy escort duties in the Atlantic and was being refitted when the Battle of France began in May 1940. After the surrender of France a month later, Panthère was reduced to reserve. When the Germans attempted to seize the French fleet there in November 1942, she was one of the few ships that was not scuttled and was captured virtually intact.

The Germans later turned her over to the Royal Italian Navy (Regia Marina) who renamed her FR 22 when they recommissioned her in early 1943. The ship was scuttled when Italy surrendered in September and scrapped after the war.

== Design and description ==
The Chacal-class ships were designed to counter the large Italian Leone-class destroyers. They had an overall length of 126.8 meters (416 ft 0 in), a beam of 11.1 meters (36 ft 5 in), and a draft of 4.1 meters (13 ft 5 in). The ships displaced 2,126 metric tons (2,092 long tons) at standard and 2,980–3,075 metric tons (2,933–3,026 long tons) at deep load. They were powered by two geared steam turbines, each driving one propeller shaft, using steam provided by five du Temple boilers. The turbines were designed to produce 50,000 metric horsepower (37,000 kW; 49,000 shp), which would propel the ship at 35.5 knots (65.7 km/h; 40.9 mph). During her sea trials on 20 April 1927, Panthère's turbines provided 56,900 metric horsepower (41,800 kW; 56,100 shp) and she reached 35.7 knots (66.1 km/h; 41.1 mph) for a single hour. The ships carried 530 metric tons (522 long tons) of fuel oil which gave them a range of 3,000 nautical miles (5,600 km; 3,500 mi) at 15 knots (28 km/h; 17 mph). Their crew consisted of 10 officers and 187 crewmen in peacetime and 12 officers and 209 enlisted men in wartime.

The main armament of the Chacal-class ships consisted of five Canon de 130 mm Modèle 1919 guns in single mounts, one superfiring pair fore and aft of the superstructure and the fifth gun abaft the aft funnel. The guns were numbered '1' to '5' from front to rear. Their anti-aircraft armament consisted of two Canon de 75 mm modèle 1924 guns in single mounts positioned amidships. The ships carried two above-water triple sets of 550-millimeter (21.7 in) torpedo tubes. A pair of depth charge chutes were built into their stern; these housed a total of twenty 200-kilogram (440 lb) depth charges. They were also fitted with four depth-charge throwers for which they carried a dozen 100-kilogram (220 lb) depth charges.

== Construction and career ==
Panthère, named after the eponymous feline, was ordered on 26 February 1923 from Arsenal de Lorient. She was laid down on 23 December 1923, once the slipway was vacated by her sister ship Jaguar. Launched on 27 October 1924, commissioned on 1 November 1926, completed on 4 January 1927 and entered service a month later. Completion was delayed by problems with her propulsion machinery and late deliveries by sub-contractors. The ship was assigned to the 1st Large Destroyer Division (1ère division de contre-torpeilleurs) (DCT) of the Mediterranean Squadron (renamed 5th Light Division (Division légère) (DL) of the First Squadron (1ère Escadre) on 1 February 1927) based at Toulon upon completion, together with her sisters Jaguar and Chacal. On 27 April 1927, Panthère participated in a naval review by Gaston Doumergue, President of France, off Marseille. The ship was also present when he next reviewed the fleet on 3 July 1928 off Le Havre. On 9 October 1928, Panthère got underway from Toulon with Chacal and Tigre to search for the missing submarine Ondine.

Together with Guépard, Panthère escorted the light cruisers Lamotte-Picquet and Primauguet to the French West Indies between 17 January and 30 April 1930. Two months later, the ship participated in the naval review at Algiers on 10 May 1930 commemorating the centenary of the first French landing in Algeria on 13 June 1830. The four depth charge throwers were removed in 1932 and the ship was assigned to the 9th DL (Note: The 9th DL went through a series of redesignations over the next few years. It became the 11th DL on 1 October 1934, the 1st DCT on 12 April 1937 and the 4th DCT on 15 September 1938.) of the Torpedo Training School (Ecole d'application du lancement à la mer) at Toulon on 1 October 1932. About two years later, the 75-millimeter guns were replaced by four twin mounts for 13.2-millimeter (0.5 in) anti-aircraft machineguns.

When the war started in September 1939, Panthère was still assigned to the 4th DCT with her sisters Tigre and Lynx. She was assigned to the Western Command (Forces maritimes de l'Ouest) for convoy escort duties from October to May 1940 where she guarded convoys traveling between Gibraltar and Brest as well as Casablanca, French Morocco, and Le Verdon-sur-Mer. In October – December, two depth-charge throwers were reinstalled, No. 3 gun removed, and her depth charge stowage reduced to a dozen 200 kg and eight 100 kg depth charges to improve her stability.

In May 1940, Panthère began a refit at Toulon that included the addition of piping between the forecastle and forward fuel tank to allow the ship to refuel at sea and the removal of the mainmast in favor of a platform with a twin-gun mount for the 37 mm (1.5 in) light AA gun. When France surrendered on 22 June, she was still being worked on and only one propeller shaft was available. Shortly afterwards, the ship was reduced to reserve with only a skeleton crew aboard and her anti-aircraft guns were transferred to more modern ships.

On 27 November 1942, the ship was captured almost intact by the Germans when they occupied Toulon and was turned over to the Italians on 14 December. The Regia Marina redesignated her as FR 22 and she recommissioned on 19 January 1943 after Pierre Laval, head of Vichy France, agreed to transfer her on 11 January; she sailed to Taranto on 23 March where the Italians used her as a transport in Italian waters. The ship's most notable mission was when she transported former Italian Premier Benito Mussolini from Ponza Island to La Maddalena, Sardinia on 6 August. The ship was scuttled at La Spezia on 9 September 1943 following the Italian armistice and broken up after the war.
