= French destroyer Lynx =

French Chacal-class destroyer

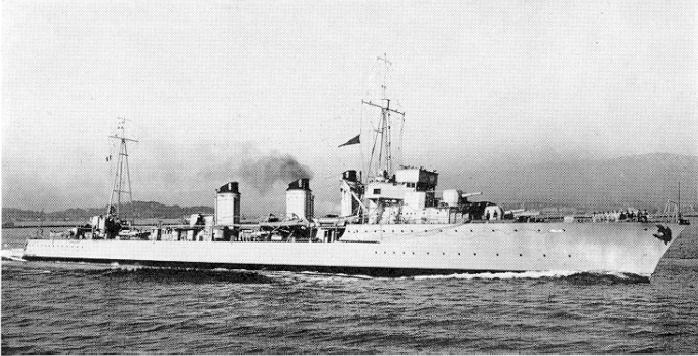
- Sister ship Chacal turning

History

France
- Name: Lynx
- Namesake: Lynx
- Ordered: 26 February 1923
- Builder: Ateliers et Chantiers de la Loire, Nantes
- Laid down: 14 January 1924
- Launched: 24 February 1925
- Completed: 18 October 1927
- In service: 15 November 1927
- Out of service: July 1940
- Fate: Scuttled, 27 November 1942; Scrapped, 1948

General characteristics (as built)
- Class & type: Chacal-class destroyer
- Displacement: 2,126 t (2,092 long tons) (standard); 2,980–3,075 t (2,933–3,026 long tons) (full load)
- Length: 126.8 m (416 ft 0.1 in)
- Beam: 11.1 m (36 ft 5.0 in)
- Draft: 4.1 m (13 ft 5.4 in)
- Installed power: 50,000 PS (37,000 kW; 49,000 shp); 5 du Temple boilers
- Propulsion: 2 shafts; 2 geared steam turbines
- Speed: 35.5 knots (65.7 km/h; 40.9 mph)
- Range: 3,000 nmi (5,600 km; 3,500 mi) at 15 knots (28 km/h; 17 mph)
- Crew: 12 officers, 209 crewmen (wartime)
- Armament: 5 × single 130 mm (5.1 in) guns; 2 × single 75 mm (3.0 in) anti-aircraft guns; 2 × triple 550 mm (21.7 in) torpedo tubes; 2 chutes; four throwers for 32 depth charges

The French destroyer Lynx was a Chacal-class destroyer (contre-torpilleur) built for the French Navy during the 1920s. The Chacals were regarded as obsolete by 1935 and Lynx became a training ship for the torpedo school at Toulon that year. She was assigned convoy escort duties in the Atlantic after the start of World War II in September 1939. In July 1940, the ship was present when the British attacked the French ships at Mers-el-Kébir, but managed to escape without damage. After she reached Toulon, Lynx was placed in reserve where she remained for the next two years. On 27 November 1942, she was scuttled at Toulon when the Germans attempted to capture the French ships there. Her wreck was salvaged in 1944, but she was not broken up until 1948.

== Design and description ==
The Chacal-class ships were designed to counter the large Italian Leone-class destroyers. They had an overall length of 126.8 meters (416 ft 0 in), a beam of 11.1 meters (36 ft 5 in), and a draft of 4.1 meters (13 ft 5 in). The ships displaced 2,126 metric tons (2,092 long tons) at standard and 2,980–3,075 metric tons (2,933–3,026 long tons) at deep load. They were powered by two geared steam turbines, each driving one propeller shaft, using steam provided by five du Temple boilers. The turbines were designed to produce 50,000 metric horsepower (37,000 kW; 49,000 shp), which would propel the ship at 35.5 knots (65.7 km/h; 40.9 mph). During her sea trials on 20 April 1927, Lynx's turbines provided 57,810 metric horsepower (42,520 kW; 57,020 shp) and she reached 35.54 knots (65.82 km/h; 40.90 mph) for a single hour. The ships carried 530 metric tons (522 long tons) of fuel oil which gave them a range of 3,000 nautical miles (5,600 km; 3,500 mi) at 15 knots (28 km/h; 17 mph). Their crew consisted of 10 officers and 187 crewmen in peacetime and 12 officers and 209 enlisted men in wartime.

The main armament of the Chacal-class ships consisted of five Canon de 130 mm Modèle 1919 guns in single mounts, one superfiring pair fore and aft of the superstructure and the fifth gun abaft the aft funnel. The guns were numbered '1' to '5' from front to rear. Their anti-aircraft armament consisted of two Canon de 75 mm modèle 1924 guns in single mounts positioned amidships. The ships carried two above-water triple sets of 550-millimeter (21.7 in) torpedo tubes. A pair of depth charge chutes were built into their stern; these housed a total of twenty 200-kilogram (440 lb) depth charges. They were also fitted with four depth-charge throwers for which they carried a dozen 100-kilogram (220 lb) depth charges.

== Construction and career ==
Lynx, named after the eponymous feline, was ordered on 26 February 1923 from Ateliers et Chantiers de la Loire. She was laid down at their Saint-Nazaire shipyard on 14 January 1924, launched on 25 February 1925, completed on 18 October 1927 and entered service on 15 November. Completion was delayed by problems with her propulsion machinery and late deliveries by sub-contractors. The ship was assigned to the 4th Light Division (DL) (4e division légère) of the 2nd Squadron (2e Escadre) based at Brest upon completion, together with her sister ships Léopard and Jaguar. On 3 July 1928, Lynx participated in a naval review by Gaston Doumergue, President of France, off Le Havre. The four depth charge throwers were removed in 1932. The next year, the ship was present when the fleet was reviewed by the new President of France, Albert Lebrun, in Cherbourg on 20 July 1933. About two years later, the 75-millimeter guns were replaced by four twin mounts for 13.2-millimeter (0.5 in) anti-aircraft machineguns. The ship was assigned to the 11th DL of the Torpedo Training School (Ecole d'application du lancement à la mer) at Toulon in 1935 as the Chacals were regarded as obsolete.

When the war started in September 1939, Lynx belonged to the 4th Large Destroyer Division (4e division de contre-torpilleurs) with her sisters Panthère and Tigre. She was assigned to the Western Command (Forces maritimes de l'Ouest) for convoy escort duties from October to May 1940 where she guarded convoys traveling between Gibraltar and Brest as well as Casablanca, French Morocco, and Le Verdon-sur-Mer. In January 1940, the ship had a British Type 123 ASDIC installed; several months later Lynx had two depth-charge throwers reinstalled, No. 3 gun removed, and her depth charge stowage reduced to a dozen 200 kg and eight 100 kg depth charges to improve her stability. She was transferred to Mers-el-Kébir, French Algeria, on 27 May and she was still there on 25 June after France surrendered. The ship managed to escape the harbor during the British attack on Mers-el-Kébir on 3 July and together with her sister Tigre briefly engaged the destroyer HMS Wrestler. The sisters then depth charged the submarine HMS Proteus as the French ships headed for Toulon, where they arrived the following day. As the oldest contre-torpilleurs in French service, Lynx and her sisters were reduced to reserve and stripped of their light anti-aircraft armament. On 27 November 1942, Lynx was scuttled at Toulon with the rest of the French fleet to prevent her capture by the Germans. She was refloated on 23 January 1944 and beached at the adjacent port of Brégaillon. The wreck was raised in 1948 and broken up.
