= French destroyer Tigre =

Chacal-class destroyer

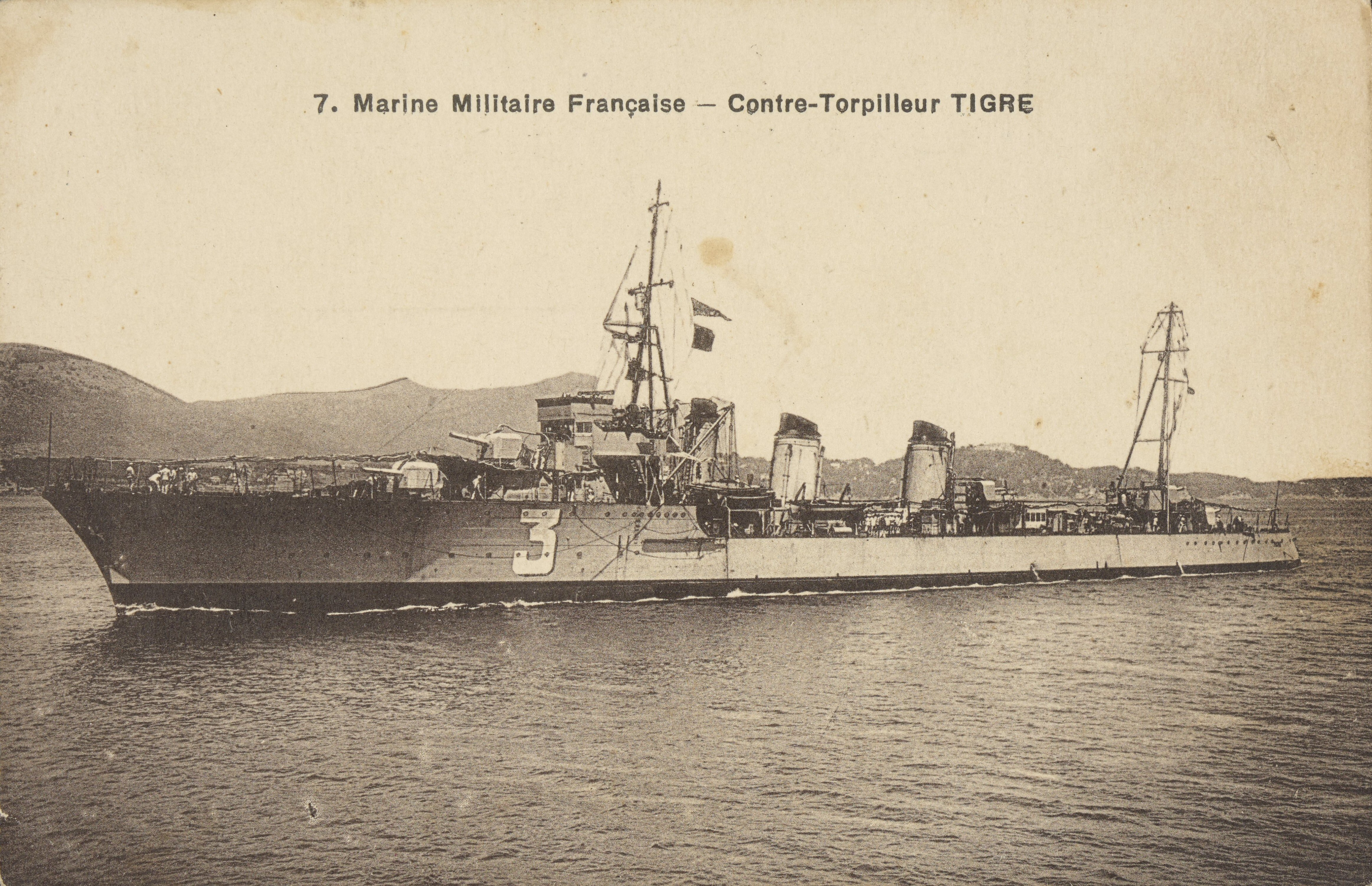

History

France
- Name: Tigre
- Namesake: Tiger
- Ordered: 26 February 1923
- Builder: Ateliers et Chantiers de Bretagne, Nantes
- Laid down: 18 September 1923
- Launched: 2 August 1924
- Completed: 1 February 1926
- In service: 7 February 1926
- Out of service: July 1940
- Captured: 27 November 1942

Kingdom of Italy
- Name: FR23
- Acquired: After 27 November 1942
- Commissioned: 19 January 1943
- Fate: Returned to France, 28 October 1943

Free French
- Name: Tigre
- Acquired: 28 October 1943
- Recommissioned: 15 December 1943
- Out of service: September 1948
- Reclassified: As a stationary training ship, late 1948
- Stricken: 4 January 1954
- Fate: Scrapped, 1955

General characteristics (as built)
- Class & type: Chacal-class destroyer
- Displacement: 2,126 t (2,092 long tons) (standard); 2,980–3,075 t (2,933–3,026 long tons) (full load)
- Length: 126.8 m (416 ft 0.1 in)
- Beam: 11.1 m (36 ft 5.0 in)
- Draft: 4.1 m (13 ft 5.4 in)
- Installed power: 50,000 PS (37,000 kW; 49,000 shp); 5 du Temple boilers
- Propulsion: 2 shafts; 2 geared steam turbines
- Speed: 35.5 knots (65.7 km/h; 40.9 mph)
- Range: 3,000 nmi (5,600 km; 3,500 mi) at 15 knots (28 km/h; 17 mph)
- Crew: 12 officers, 209 crewmen (wartime)
- Armament: 5 × single 130 mm (5.1 in) guns; 2 × single 75 mm (3.0 in) anti-aircraft guns; 2 × triple 550 mm (21.7 in) torpedo tubes; 2 chutes; four throwers for 46 depth charges

The French destroyer Tigre was a Chacal-class destroyer built for the French Navy during the 1920s. Aside from cruises to the English Channel and French West Africa, she spent her entire career in the Mediterranean Sea. The ship was assigned to the Torpedo School at Toulon in 1932 and remained there until World War II began in September 1939. She was then assigned convoy escort duties in the Atlantic; in July 1940, the ship was present when the British attacked the French ships at Mers-el-Kébir, but managed to escape without damage. After she reached Toulon, Tigre was placed in reserve where she remained for the next two years. When the Germans attempted to seize the French fleet there in November 1942, she was one of the few ships that was not scuttled and was captured virtually intact.

The Germans later turned her over to the Royal Italian Navy (Regia Marina) who renamed her FR 23 when they recommissioned her in early 1943. The ship was under repair in Italy when Italy surrendered in September, but managed to join the Allies. She was given to the Free French the following month, but she needed extensive repairs that lasted until early 1944. Tigre returned to convoy work for a few months before beginning a more extensive reconstruction that last until early 1945. She was then assigned to the Flank Force that protected Allied forces in the Tyrrhenian Sea from German forces in Northern Italy for the rest of the war. Several weeks after the end of the war in May, the ship supported French forces in Algeria during the riots in May–June. Tigre was then assigned as a fast troop transport until the end of 1946. She became a gunnery training ship until mid-1948 and was then hulked for the Engineering School. The ship was stricken from the Navy List in 1954 and broken up for scrap the following year.

== Design and description ==
The Chacal-class ships were designed to counter the large Italian Leone-class destroyers. They had an overall length of 126.8 meters (416 ft 0 in), a beam of 11.1 meters (36 ft 5 in), and a draft of 4.1 meters (13 ft 5 in). The ships displaced 2,126 metric tons (2,092 long tons) at standard and 2,980–3,075 metric tons (2,933–3,026 long tons) at deep load. They were powered by two geared steam turbines, each driving one propeller shaft, using steam provided by five du Temple boilers. The turbines were designed to produce 50,000 metric horsepower (37,000 kW; 49,000 shp), which would propel the ship at 35.5 knots (65.7 km/h; 40.9 mph). During her sea trials on 3 October 1925, Tigre's turbines provided 57,200 metric horsepower (42,100 kW; 56,400 shp) and she reached 36.7 knots (68.0 km/h; 42.2 mph) for a single hour. The ships carried 530 metric tons (522 long tons) of fuel oil which gave them a range of 3,000 nautical miles (5,600 km; 3,500 mi) at 15 knots (28 km/h; 17 mph). Their crew consisted of 10 officers and 187 crewmen in peacetime and 12 officers and 209 enlisted men in wartime.

The main armament of the Chacal-class ships consisted of five Canon de 130 mm Modèle 1919 guns in single mounts, one superfiring pair fore and aft of the superstructure and the fifth gun abaft the aft funnel. The guns were numbered '1' to '5' from front to rear. Their anti-aircraft armament consisted of two Canon de 75 mm modèle 1924 guns in single mounts positioned amidships. The ships carried two above-water triple sets of 550-millimeter (21.7 in) torpedo tubes. A pair of depth charge chutes were built into their stern; these housed a total of twenty 200-kilogram (440 lb) depth charges. They were also fitted with four depth-charge throwers for which they carried a dozen 100-kilogram (220 lb) depth charges.

== Construction and career ==
Tigre, named after the eponymous feline, was ordered on 26 February 1923 from Ateliers et Chantiers de Bretagne. She was laid down at their Nantes shipyard on 18 September, launched on 2 August 1924, completed on 1 February 1926 and entered service six days later. Completion was delayed by problems with her propulsion machinery and late deliveries by sub-contractors. The ship was assigned to the 1st Large Destroyer Division (1ère division de contre-torpeilleurs) (DCT) of the Mediterranean Squadron (renamed 5th Light Division (Division légère) (DL) of the First Squadron (1ère Escadre) on 1 February 1927) based at Toulon upon completion, together with her sister ships Panthère and Chacal. A few days after her arrival at Toulon, Tigre was on display during the Nice Carnival. On 27 April 1927, the ship participated in a naval review by Gaston Doumergue, President of France, off Marseille. The following month, she was one of the ships that escorted Doumergue across the English Channel during his state visit to Britain in May–June 1927. Tigre was also present when he next reviewed the fleet on 3 July 1928 off Le Havre. On 9 October 1928, Tigre got underway from Toulon with Chacal and Panthère to search for the missing submarine Ondine.

Tigre and Chacal escorted the light cruiser Primauguet to French West Africa between 13 January and 10 April 1931 and the four depth charge throwers were removed in 1932. The ship was assigned to the 9th DL (Note: The 9th DL went through a series of redesignations over the next few years. It became the 11th DL on 1 October 1934, the 1st DCT on 12 April 1937 and the 4th DCT on 15 September 1938.) of the Torpedo Training School (Ecole d'application du lancement à la mer) at Toulon on 1 October 1932. About two years later, the 75-millimeter guns were replaced by four twin mounts for 13.2-millimeter (0.5 in) anti-aircraft machineguns. When the war started in September 1939, Tigre was still assigned to the 4th DCT with her sisters Panthère and Lynx. She was assigned to the Western Command (Forces maritimes de l'Ouest) for convoy escort duties from October to May 1940 where she guarded convoys traveling between Gibraltar and Brest as well as Casablanca, French Morocco, and Le Verdon-sur-Mer. In November, the ship had a British Type 123 ASDIC installed; in addition two depth-charge throwers were reinstalled, No. 3 gun removed, and her depth charge stowage reduced to a dozen 200 kg and eight 100 kg depth charges to improve her stability. The ship managed to escape the harbor during the British attack on Mers-el-Kébir on 3 July and briefly engaged the destroyer HMS Wrestler, together with her sister Lynx. The sisters then depth charged the submarine HMS Proteus as the French ships headed for Toulon, where they arrived the following day. As the oldest contre-torpilleurs in service, Tigre and her sisters were reduced to reserve and stripped of their light anti-aircraft armament.

On 27 November 1942, the ship was captured almost intact by the Germans when they occupied Toulon and was turned over to the Italians on 14 December. The Regia Marina redesignated her as FR23 and she recommissioned on 19 January 1943 after Pierre Laval, head of Vichy France, agreed to transfer her on 11 January; she sailed to Taranto on 13 April where the Italians used her as a transport in Italian waters. She was still not fully operational when Italy surrendered on 8 September and the ship was turned over to the Free French at Bizerte, French North Africa, on 28 October. Tigre was recommissioned on 15 December, but her repairs at Bizerte and, later, Casablanca, took until March 1944. A few 20 mm (0.8 in) Oerlikon light AA guns were installed while she was being repaired. She escorted convoys in the Mediterranean until she began a lengthy reconstruction at Oran, French North Africa, that lasted until 3 February 1945. While escorting a convoy from Corsica to Algiers, the ship was damaged by splinters from two near-misses on 20 April 1944. While in Oran, Tigre's forward boiler and funnel were replaced by additional oil tanks, that increased her range to 4,000 nmi (7,400 km; 4,600 mi) at 13 knots (24 km/h; 15 mph), and additional accommodation for her crew. Her depth charge chutes were sealed off and a pair of British-style racks were installed, each holding nine depth charges as well as four, later two, depth-charge throwers and additional depth charges. One set of torpedo tubes were removed in compensation. Her anti-aircraft suite now consisted of two single mounts for 40 mm (1.6 in) Bofors and ten single Oerlikon light AA guns. Tigre was then assigned to the French-controlled task force, known as Flank Force, that provided naval gunfire support for Allied forces operating near the Italian-French border and protected the Allied flank against German naval forces in Genoa and La Spezia, Italy.

The ship was in Toulon when the war ended in May 1945. She provided fire support to French forces during the riots in Algeria later that month and in June. Tigre then began ferrying troops throughout the Mediterranean until December 1946. She then became a gunnery training ship until 9 September 1948 while the destroyer Albatros was being converted. Afterwards, Tigre served as a stationary training ship for the Engineer School at Saint-Mandrier-sur-Mer until she was stricken from the Navy List on 4 January 1954. The hulk was scrapped the following year.
