= Attack on Mers-el-Kébir =

1940 British attack on the French Navy

- Part of the Battle of the Mediterranean during the Second World War
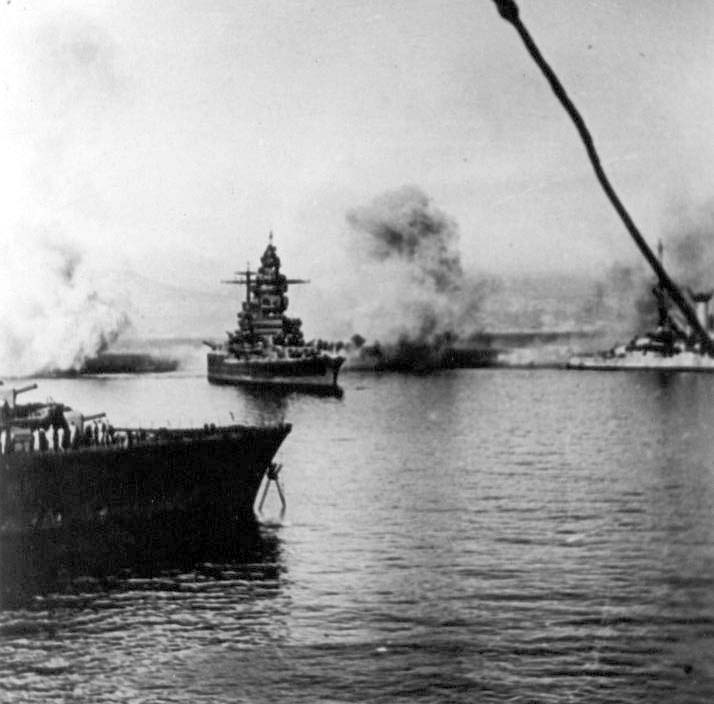
- The battleship Strasbourg under fire
Date	3 July 1940
Location	Off Mers El Kébir, French Algeria, North Africa 35°43′10″N 0°41′20″W
Result	See Aftermath

Belligerents
United Kingdom	France

Commanders and leaders
James Somerville; Dudley Pound	Marcel-Bruno Gensoul; François Darlan

Strength
1 aircraft carrier; 2 battleships; 1 battlecruiser; 2 light cruisers; 11 destroyers; At least 23 aircraft	4 battleships; 6 destroyers; 1 aviso; 1 seaplane tender; 42 aircraft

Casualties and losses
2 aircrew killed; 2 sailors wounded; 3 Swordfish; 2 Skuas	1,297 killed; 350 wounded; 1 battleship sunk; 2 battleships damaged; 2 destroyers damaged; 1 seaplane tender damaged; 1 destroyer grounded; 1 tugboat destroyed; 3 aircraft damaged

The attack on Mers-el-Kébir (Battle of Mers-el-Kébir) on 3 July 1940, during the Second World War, was a British naval attack on French Navy ships at the naval base at Mers El Kébir, near Oran, on the coast of French Algeria. (Note: The French war fleet was "neutral", as required by the Armistice of 22 June 1940 between Vichy France and Germany.) The attack was the main part of Operation Catapult, a British plan to neutralise or destroy French ships to prevent them from falling into German hands after the Allied defeat in the Battle of France. The British bombardment of the base killed 1,297 French servicemen, sank a battleship and damaged five other ships, for a British loss of five aircraft shot down and two crewmen killed. The attack by air and sea was conducted by the Royal Navy, after France had signed armistices with Germany and Italy, coming into effect on 25 June.

Of particular significance to the British were the three battleships of the Bretagne class and the four fast battleships of the Richelieu and Dunkerque classes, the second largest force of capital ships in Europe after the Royal Navy. The British War Cabinet feared that the ships would fall into Axis hands. Admiral François Darlan, commander of the French Navy, assured the British, even after the French armistices with Germany and Italy that the fleet would remain under French control. Winston Churchill and the War Cabinet judged that the risk was too great. Darlan repeatedly refused British requests to place the fleet in British custody or move it to the French West Indies, out of German reach.

The British attack was condemned in France as an attack on a neutral nation and resentment festered for years over what was considered betrayal by a former ally. The French thought that their assurances were honourable and should have been sufficient. Marshal Philippe Pétain, who was appointed the Prime Minister of France on 16 June, severed diplomatic relations with the United Kingdom on 8 July.

French aircraft retaliated by bombing Gibraltar and French ships exchanged fire several times with British ships, before a tacit truce was observed in the western Mediterranean. On 27 November 1942, after the beginning of Operation Torch, the Allied invasion of French North Africa, the French Navy foiled Case Anton, a German and Italian operation to capture its ships at Toulon, by scuttling them. In 1997, Martin Thomas wrote that the British attack at Mers-el Kébir remains controversial but that other historians have written that it demonstrated to the world that Britain would fight on.

== Background ==
=== French–German armistice ===
After the Fall of France in 1940 and the armistice between France and Nazi Germany, the British War Cabinet was apprehensive about control over the French navy. The French and German navies combined could alter the balance of power at sea, threatening British imports over the Atlantic and communications with the rest of the British Empire. In Article 8, Paragraph 2 of the Armistice terms, the German government "solemnly and firmly declared that it had no intention of making demands regarding the French fleet during the peace negotiations" and there were similar terms in the armistice with Italy but they were considered by the British to be no guarantee of the neutralisation of the French fleet. On 24 June, Darlan assured Winston Churchill against such a possibility. Churchill ordered that a demand be made that the French Navy (Marine nationale) should either join with the Royal Navy or be neutralised in a manner guaranteed to prevent the ships falling into Axis hands.

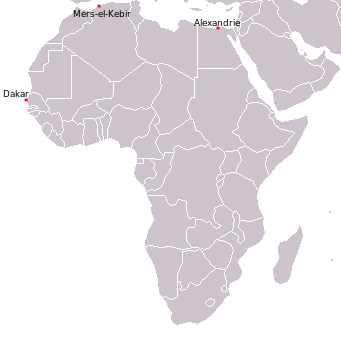
French ships based in Africa, June 1940

At Italian suggestion, the armistice terms were amended to permit the French fleet temporarily to stay in North African ports, where they might be seized by Italian troops from Libya. The British made a contingency plan, Operation Catapult, to eliminate the French fleet in mid-June, when it was clear that Philippe Pétain was forming a government with a view to ending the war and it seemed likely that the French fleet might be seized by the Germans. In a speech to Parliament, Churchill repeated that the Armistice of 22 June 1940 was a betrayal of the Allied agreement not to make a separate peace. Churchill said, "What is the value of that? Ask half a dozen countries; what is the value of such a solemn assurance? ... Finally, the armistice could be voided at any time on any pretext of non-observance".

The French fleet had seen little fighting during the Battle of France and was mostly intact. By tonnage, about 40 per cent was in Toulon, near Marseille, 40 per cent in French North Africa and 20 per cent in Britain, Alexandria and the French West Indies. Although Churchill feared the fleet would be used by the Axis, the need to man, maintain and arm the French ships with items that were incompatible with German and Italian equipments made this unlikely. The Kriegsmarine and Benito Mussolini made overtures but Adolf Hitler feared that an attempted take-over would provoke the French fleet into defecting to the British. Churchill and Hitler viewed the fleet as a potential threat; the French leaders used the fleet (and the possibility of its rejoining the Allies) as a bargaining counter against the Germans to keep them out of unoccupied France (the zone libre) and French North Africa. The armistice was contingent on the French right to man their vessels and the French Navy Minister, Admiral François Darlan, had ordered the Atlantic fleet to Toulon and to demobilise, with orders to scuttle the ships if the Germans tried to take them.

=== British–French negotiations ===
The British tried to persuade the French authorities in North Africa to continue the war or to hand over the fleet to British control. A British admiral visited Oran on 24 June and Duff Cooper, the Minister of Information, visited Casablanca on 27 June. The French Atlantic ports were in German hands and the British needed to keep the German surface fleet out of the Mediterranean, confine the Italian fleet to the Mediterranean and to blockade ports still under French control. The Admiralty was against an attack on the French fleet in case the ships were not sufficiently damaged, France declared war and because the French colonies would be less likely to defect. The Royal Navy lacked the ships permanently to blockade the French naval bases in North Africa and keep the Atlantic approaches open, that made the risk of the Germans or the Italians seizing the French capital ships too great. The fleet in Toulon was too well guarded by shore artillery and the Royal Navy decided to attack the base in North Africa instead.

== Ultimatum ==
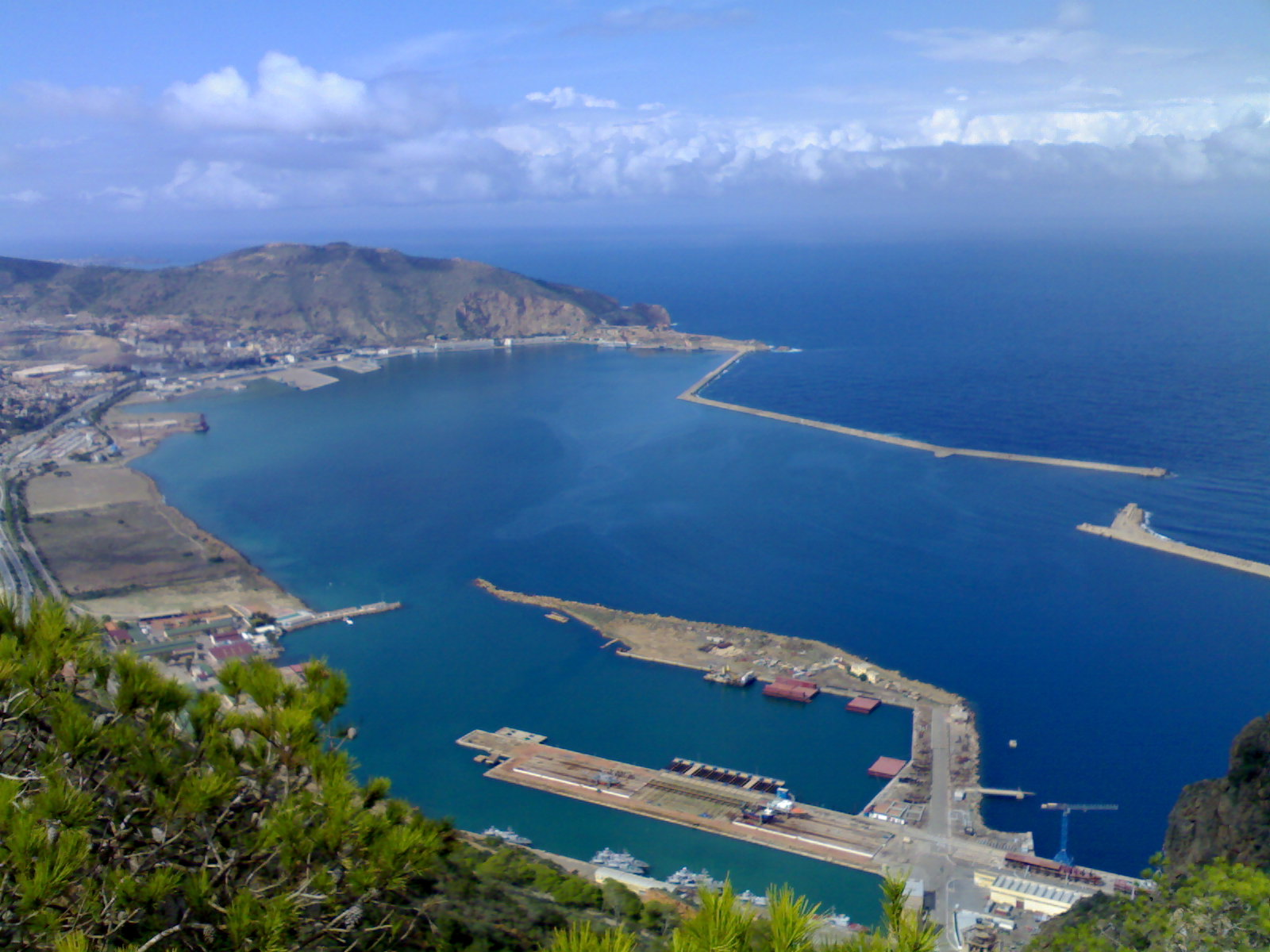
Modern view of the harbour at Mers El Kébir in Algeria

The most powerful group of French warships was commanded by Admiral Marcel-Bruno Gensoul at Mers-el-Kébir in French Algeria, comprising the old battleships Provence (commander of the 2nd Battleship Division, Rear-Admiral Jacques Bouxin, embarked) and Bretagne (Captain Le Pivain), the newer Force de Raid battleships Dunkerque (Captain Barois) and Strasbourg (Captain Louis Collinet), the seaplane tender Commandant Teste (Captain Lemaire), a flotilla of six destroyers comprising Mogador, Volta, Tigre, Lynx, Kersaint and Le Terrible (Rear-Admiral Émile-Marie Lacroix) and a gunboat Rigault de Genouilly (Louis Georges Emile Frossard). Admiral James Somerville, commander of Force H, based in Gibraltar, was ordered to deliver an ultimatum to the French, the terms of which were contrary to the German–French armistice. (Note: It is impossible for us, your comrades up to now, to allow your fine ships to fall into the power of the German enemy. We are determined to fight on until the end, and if we win, as we think we shall, we shall never forget that France was our Ally, that our interests are the same as hers, and that our common enemy is Germany. Should we conquer we solemnly declare that we shall restore the greatness and territory of France. For this purpose we must make sure that the best ships of the French Navy are not used against us by the common foe. In these circumstances, His Majesty's Government have instructed me to demand that the French Fleet now at Mers el Kebir and Oran shall act in accordance with one of the following alternatives; (a) Sail with us and continue the fight until victory against the Germans. (b) Sail with reduced crews under our control to a British port. The reduced crews would be repatriated at the earliest moment. If either of these courses is adopted by you we will restore your ships to France at the conclusion of the war or pay full compensation if they are damaged meanwhile. (c) Alternatively, if you feel bound to stipulate that your ships should not be used against the Germans lest they break the Armistice, then sail them with us with reduced crews to some French port in the West Indies—Martinique for instance—where they can be demilitarised to our satisfaction, or perhaps be entrusted to the United States and remain safe until the end of the war, the crews being repatriated. If you refuse these fair offers, I must with profound regret, require you to sink your ships within 6 hours. Finally, failing the above, I have orders from His Majesty's Government to use whatever force may be necessary to prevent your ships from falling into German or Italian hands. — Somerville)

Somerville passed the duty of presenting the ultimatum to a French speaker, Captain Cedric Holland, commander of the carrier HMS Ark Royal. Gensoul was affronted that negotiations were being conducted by a less-senior officer and sent his lieutenant, Bernard Dufay, which led to much delay and confusion. As the negotiations continued, it became clear that agreement was unlikely. The French made preparations for action and 42 aircraft were armed and made ready for take-off. Darlan was at home on 3 July and could not be contacted; Gensoul told the French government that the alternatives were internment or battle but omitted the option of sailing to the French West Indies. Removing the fleet to US waters had formed part of the orders given by Darlan to Gensoul in the event that a foreign power should attempt to seize his ships.

== Operation Catapult ==
=== Plymouth, Portsmouth and Alexandria ===
Along with French vessels in metropolitan ports, some had sailed to ports in Britain or to Alexandria in Egypt. Operation Catapult was an attempt to take these ships under British control or destroy them. The French ships berthed in Plymouth and Portsmouth were boarded without warning on the night of 3 July. The submarine Surcouf, the largest in the world, had been at Plymouth for the last month. The crew resisted a boarding party and three Royal Navy personnel, including two officers, were killed, along with a French sailor. Other ships captured included the old battleships Paris and Courbet, the destroyers Le Triomphant and Léopard, eight torpedo boats, five submarines and a number of lesser ships. The French squadron in Alexandria (Admiral René-Émile Godfroy) including the battleship Lorraine, the heavy cruiser Suffren and three modern light cruisers, was neutralised by local agreement.

=== Attack on Mers-el-Kébir ===
Diagram of the British attack on Mers-el-Kébir

The British force comprised the battlecruiser HMS Hood, the battleships HMS Valiant and Resolution, the aircraft carrier Ark Royal and an escort of cruisers and destroyers. The British had freedom of manoeuvre, while the French fleet was anchored in a narrow harbour, its crews not expecting an attack. The British capital ships had 15 in (380 mm) guns and fired a heavier broadside than the French battleships. On 3 July, before negotiations were formally terminated, six British Fairey Swordfish planes escorted by three Blackburn Skuas from Ark Royal dropped five magnetic mines in the harbour exit. The force was intercepted by five French Curtiss H-75 fighters which shot down a Skua into the sea with the loss of its two crew, the only British fatalities in the action.

The six La Galissonnière-class cruisers at Algiers were summoned but did not reach Mers-El-Kebir in time. The Préfet Maritime at Toulon ordered two submarine flotillas, groupe A consisting of L'Espoir, Le Conquérant and Archimède and groupe B, comprising Iris, Vénus, Sultane, Sirène, Pallas and Cérès, to assist the French at Oran by attacking British ships, Hood in particular. After receiving orders on 3 July to form a north–south patrol line in the Mediterranean for a distance of 20 nmi (37 km; 23 mi) east of Alboran Island and south of Cape Palos during the night of 6/7 July, to protect Oran and attack British ships, the French submarines Archimède, Le Conquérant and L'Espoir got underway from Toulon at 2:45 a.m. on 4 July bound for their patrol area at 15 kn (28 km/h; 17 mph). No contacts were made and the boats were recalled on 5 July when it was discovered that the British ships had returned to Gibraltar. Gensoul ordered the four submarines at Oran, Ariane, Danaé, Diane and Eurydice to take post off the port. The orders to the four French submarines were quickly decoded and London ordered Somerville to act; the boats were unable to close with Force H. Churchill ordered the British ships to open fire at the same time and the British commenced at 5:57 p.m. from 17,500 yd (8.6 nmi; 9.9 mi; 16.0 km).

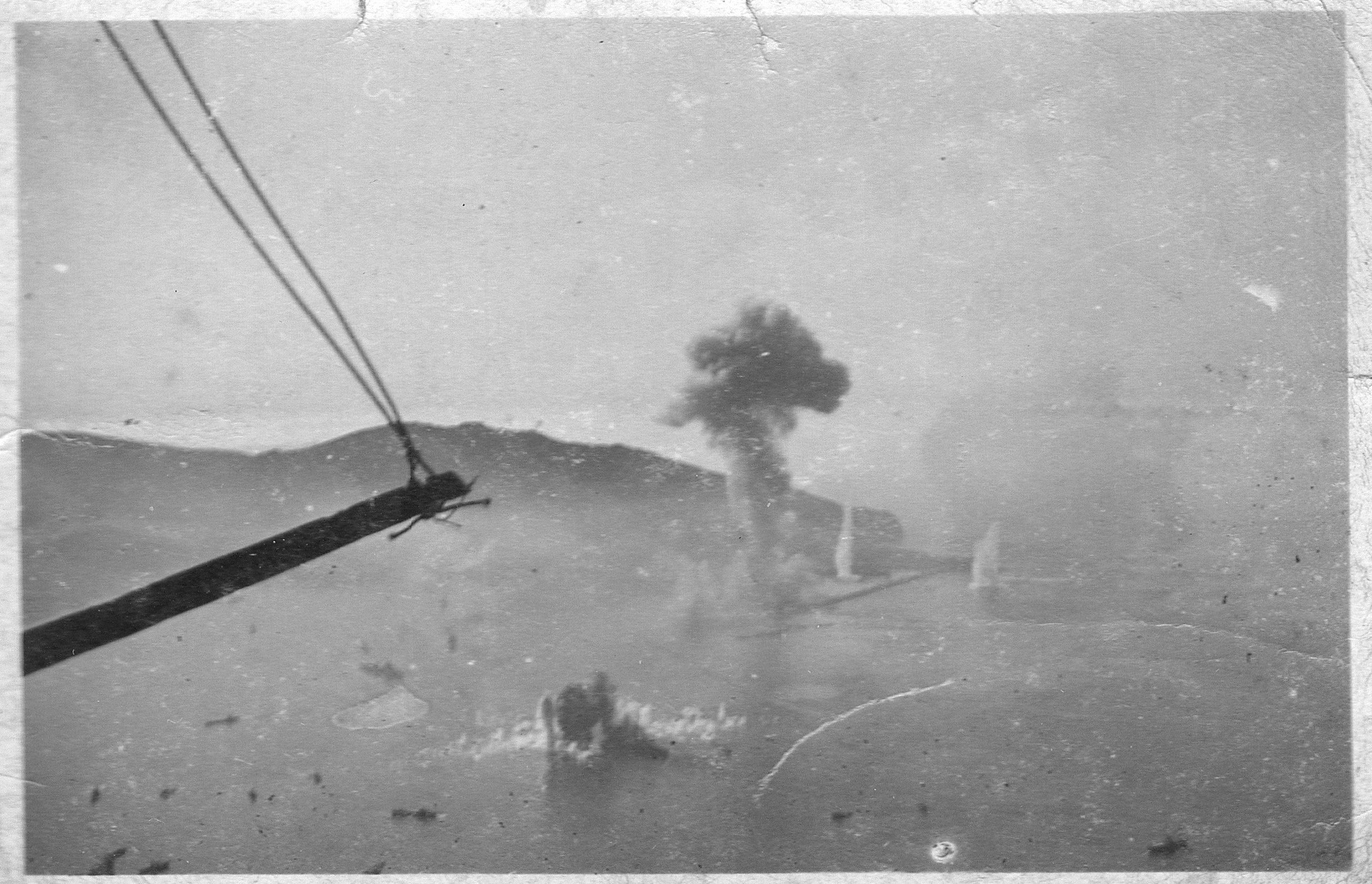
French photograph of the bombardment

The British opened fire at 6 p.m. Provence replied within 90 seconds but the main armament of Dunkerque and Strasbourg was forward of the superstructure and could not immediately be brought to bear, because they were tied up at the mole, with their sterns facing the sea. The third British salvo hit Bretagne and detonated a magazine, the ship sinking with 977 of her crew at 6:09 p.m. After thirty salvoes, the French ships ceased fire; Force H altered course to avoid return fire from the French coastal forts but Provence was badly damaged by several hits, Dunkerque was hit by three shells, severely damaged and run aground to avoid sinking, the destroyer Mogador lost its stern and two other destroyers were damaged; their crews ran them aground to prevent them from sinking. Four French Morane-Saulnier M.S.406 fighters arrived, outnumbering the British Skuas. Another nine French fighters were spotted at 7:10 p.m. and a dogfight ensued in which a Curtiss H-75 and an M.S.406 were damaged. Three more Curtiss fighters appeared and there was another engagement.

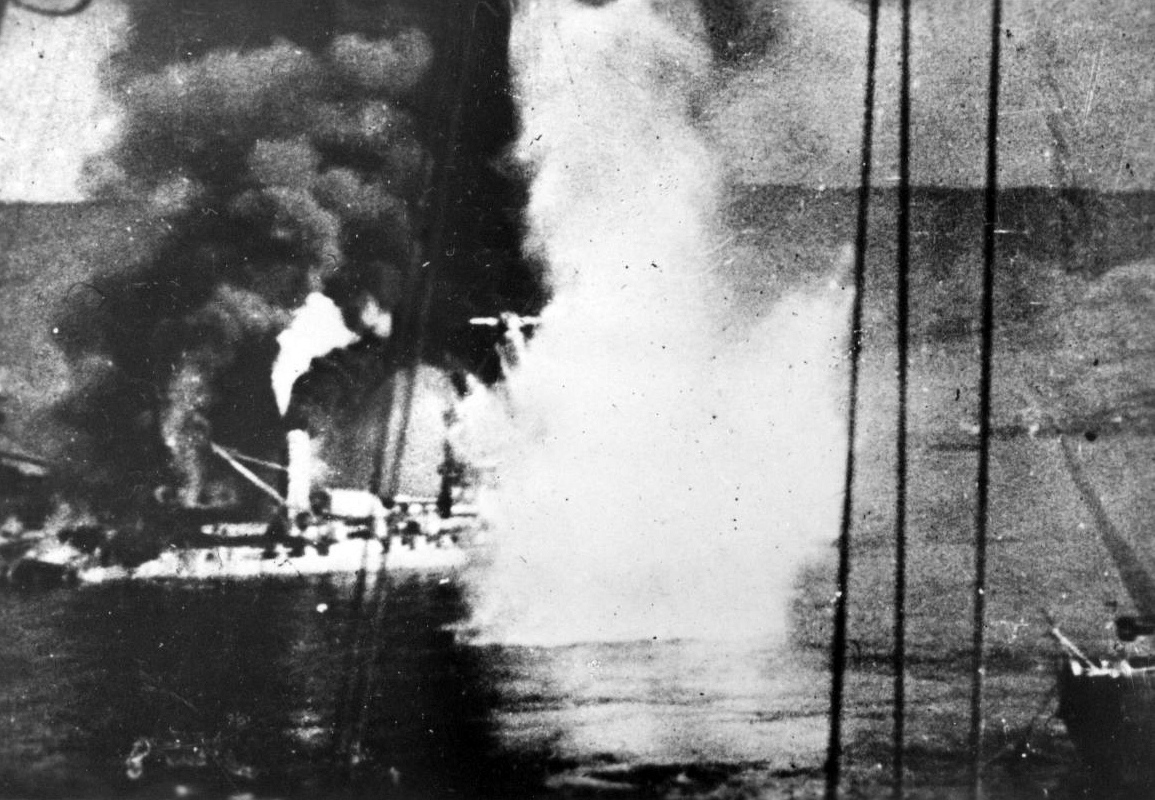
Bretagne on fire, still under bombardment

Strasbourg, three destroyers and one gunboat managed to avoid the mines and escape from the port under attack from a flight of Swordfish bombers from Ark Royal. The French ships shot down two Swordfish, the crews being rescued by the destroyer Wrestler; a French flying boat also bombed a British destroyer. As the British bombing had little effect, at 6:43 p.m. Somerville ordered his ships to pursue. Rigault de Genouilly, en route to Oran, met Force H at 7:33 p.m. and steamed towards Hood, only to come under fire from the light cruisers Arethusa and Enterprise at 12,000 and 18,000 yd (5.9 and 8.9 nmi; 6.8 and 10.2 mi; 11 and 16 km) respectively. Hood also fired several 15-inch shells at Rigault de Genouilly and the French ship replied with nineteen 5.5 in (14 cm) shells before being hit by Enterprise and withdrawing. A British aircraft had sighted Danaé and Eurydice shortly before 8:00 p.m. and dropped illuminated floats to guide a British destroyer to them. The destroyer depth-charged the two submarines but they escaped without damage.

Valiant and Resolution fell behind Hood. Somerville had received information that the French naval force from Algiers, four heavy cruisers, four light cruisers and several destroyers, was steering to rendezvous with Strasbourg. Without Valiant and Resolution, Somerville concluded that by the time his ships came within gunnery range of Strasbourg, shortly after 9:00 p.m., he would be outnumbered by the combined French force and ill deployed for a night engagement, silhouetted against the evening twilight, giving an advantage to the French gunners. At 8:20 p.m., when Hood had closed to 25 nmi (46 km; 29 mi) from Strasbourg, Somerville called off the pursuit. After another ineffective Swordfish attack at 8:55 p.m., Strasbourg reached Toulon on 4 July. The French cruiser force from Algiers missed its rendezvous with Strasbourg but arrived at Toulon on 4 July. During the night of 3/4 July 1940, Ariane, Danaé, Diane and Eurydice patrolled on the surface off Oran in a north–south patrol line and they remained on patrol off Oran until 8:00 p.m. on 4 July, before returning to Oran. On 4 July, the British submarine Pandora encountered Rigault de Genouilly off the Algerian coast, mistook her for a cruiser and sank her. The French Air Force (Armée de l'Air) made reprisal raids on Gibraltar, including a small night attack on 5 July, when many bombs landed in the sea.

=== Actions of 8 July ===
The British believed that the damage inflicted on Dunkerque and Provence was not serious and on the morning of 8 July raided Mers-el-Kébir again in Operation Lever, with Swordfish aircraft from Ark Royal. A torpedo hit the patrol boat Terre-Neuve, moored alongside Dunkerque, full of depth charges. Terre-Neuve quickly sank and the depth charges went off, causing serious damage to the battleship. Another attack took place on 8 July, when aircraft from the carrier Hermes attacked the Richelieu at Dakar, seriously damaging it. When word of the events at Dakar reached Oran, the French submarines Ariane, Diane, and Eurydice got back underway on 8 July to form a patrol line off Cape Falcon, Algeria, in case of another British attack on Oran, which did not occur.

== Aftermath ==
=== Analysis ===
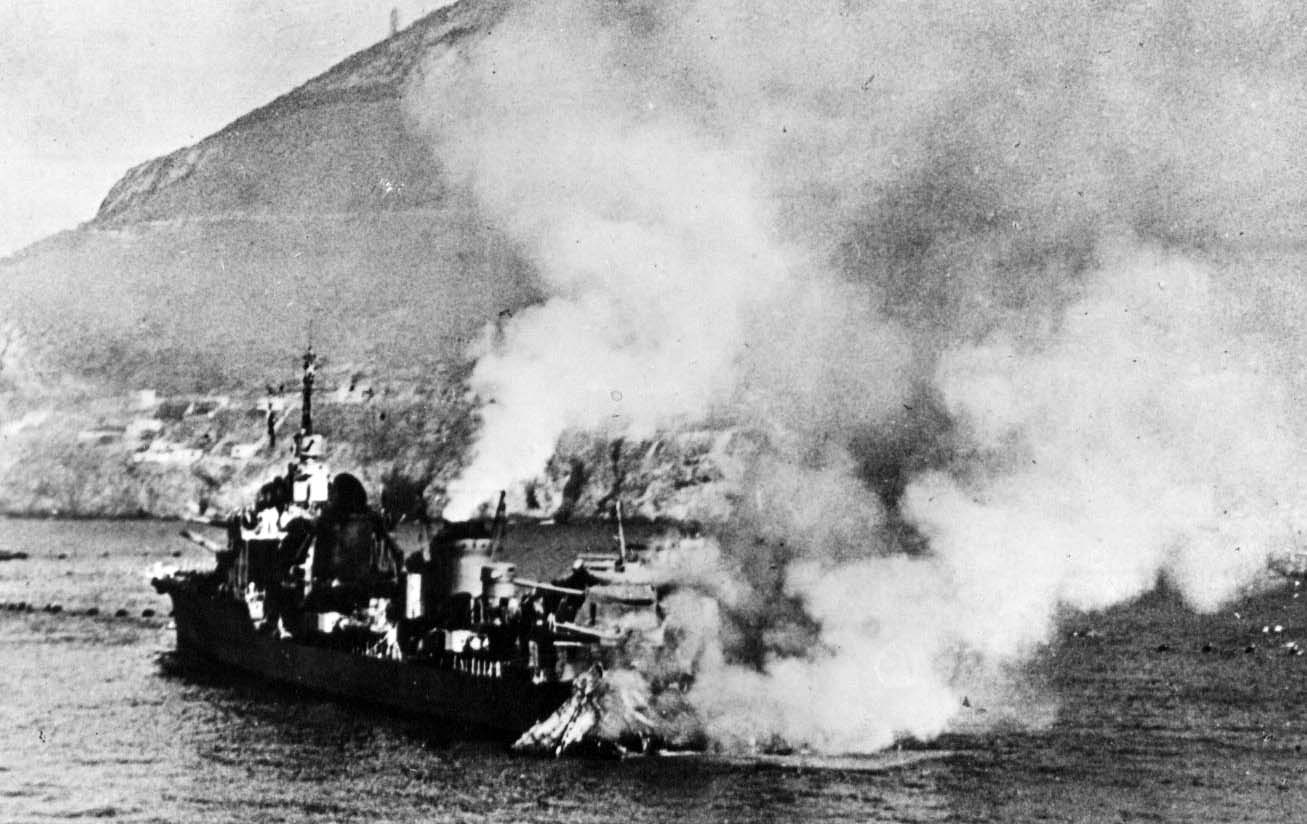
French destroyer Mogador running aground, after having been hit by a 15-inch shell

Churchill wrote, "This was the most hateful decision, the most unnatural and painful in which I have ever been concerned." Relations between Britain and France were severely strained for some time and the Germans enjoyed a propaganda coup. Somerville said that it was "the biggest political blunder of modern times and will rouse the whole world against us ... we all feel thoroughly ashamed". The attack revived Anglophobia in France, demonstrated British resolve to continue the war and rallied the British Conservative Party around Churchill (Neville Chamberlain, Churchill's predecessor as prime minister, was still party leader). The British action showed the world that defeat in France had not reduced the determination of the government to fight on and ambassadors in Mediterranean countries reported favourable reactions.

The French ships in Alexandria under the command of Admiral René-Emile Godfroy, including the old battleship Lorraine and four cruisers, were blockaded by the British on 3 July and offered the same terms as at Mers-el-Kébir. After delicate negotiations, conducted on the part of the British by Admiral Andrew Cunningham, Godfroy agreed on 7 July to disarm his fleet and stay in port until the end of the war. Some sailors joined the Free French while others were repatriated to France; the ships at Alexandria went on to be used by the Free French after May 1943. The British attacks on French vessels in port increased tension between Churchill and Charles de Gaulle, who was recognised by the British as the leader of the Free French Forces on 28 June 1940.

Eric Seal, Churchill's principal private secretary, wrote "[Churchill] was convinced that the Americans were impressed by ruthlessness in dealing with a ruthless foe; and in his mind the American reaction to our attack on the French fleet in Oran was of the first importance". On 4 July, Roosevelt told the French ambassador that he would have done the same. Jean Lacouture, in a biography of De Gaulle, blamed the tragedy mainly on miscommunication; if Darlan had been in contact on the day or if Somerville had possessed a more diplomatic character, a deal might have been done. Lacouture accepted that there was a danger that the French ships might have been captured by German or more likely Italian troops, given the ease with which the British seized French ships in British ports or the Germans seized French ships in Bizerte in Tunisia in November 1942.

In 2004, David Brown wrote that foreign opinion was generally favourable to Operation Catapult and that the demonstration of British determination had succeeded. In 2010, Colin Smith wrote that the attack was the first big triumph of Churchill's premiership and that they had been received favourably by the governments of the US, Turkey, Greece and Brazil, with condemnation from Spain and Switzerland. Count Galeazzo Ciano, the Italian foreign minister, made a diary entry that the Royal Navy retained the "ruthlessness of the captains and pirates of the C16th".

In 2015, George Melton offered a dissenting opinion, and argued that much of the historiography of the attack represented a "Churchillian perspective" that ignored how the British attack on Mers el-Kébir had been a "tactical failure". Melton wrote that the attack was unnecessary, because the French Navy had pledged and planned to scuttle its ships as a matter of honour rather than see them fall into German or Italian hands. The results of the attack were the opposite of what the British intended because it had sunk or put out of action very little of the French fleet, rather than ensure that the fleet was neutralised; prompted French ships that had been dispersed to remote bases in French North Africa, where they were beyond the reach of the Axis, to concentrate at Toulon, where they formed a powerful striking force and were in far greater danger of seizure by Axis forces. The attack united the French Navy and French people in hostility to the British.

The British lost access to the French Empire and French leaders other than Charles de Gaulle and an undeclared Anglo-French conflict over the next few months made the British strategic situation worse. Melton called it a "myth" that the attack had demonstrated British resolve to the United States, something British decision-makers did not discuss prior to the attack and which he wrote could have been more convincingly achieved through an attack on the Italian fleet or a large bombing raid against Germany. Melton suggested that Churchill's anger at France for its capitulation to the Axis and his "obsession" with seizing or sinking the four modern French battleships (Jean Bart, Richelieu, Dunkerque, and Strasbourg) was largely responsible for the attack.

In an official Navy News magazine in 1990, an attack on Mers-el-Kébir was described as "one of the most distasteful acts the Royal Navy has ever had to perform".

=== Casualties ===
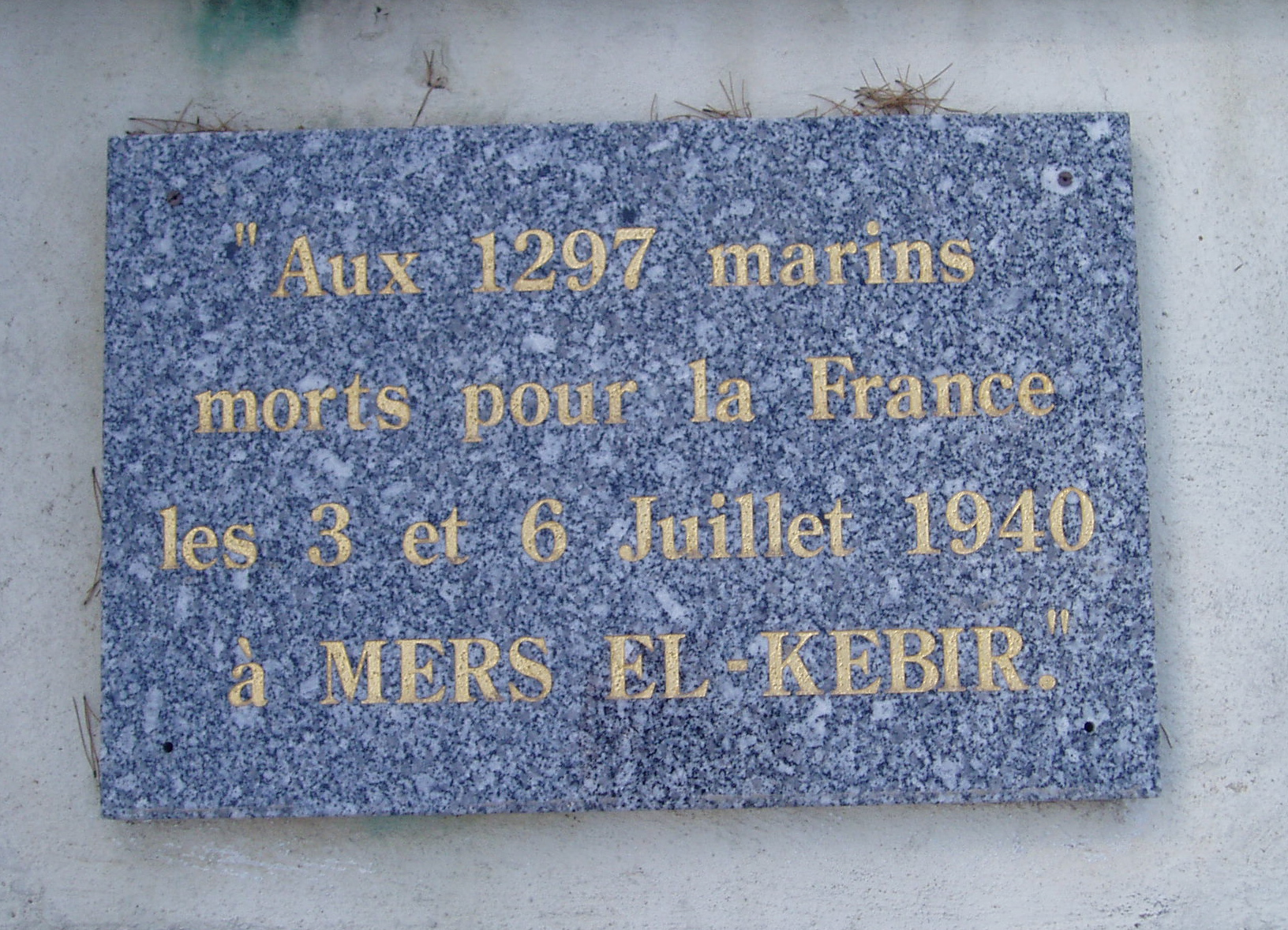
Memorial on the coast path at Toulon to the 1,297 French seamen killed at Mers El Kebir

Numbers killed at Mers-el-Kébir
Ship	Officers	Petty officers	Sailors, marines	Total
Bretagne	36	151	825	1012
Dunkerque	9	32	169	210
Provence	1	2	—	3
Strasbourg	—	2	3	5
Mogador	—	3	35	38
Rigault de Genouilly	—	3	9	12
Terre Neuve	1	1	6	8
Armen	—	3	3	6
Esterel	1	5	—	6
Total	48	202	1,050	1,300
Fleet Air Arm	—	—	—	2

=== Subsequent events ===
==== British–Vichy hostilities ====
Following the 3 July operation, Darlan ordered the French fleet to attack Royal Navy ships wherever possible; Pétain and his foreign minister Paul Baudouin over-ruled the order the next day. Military retaliation was conducted by ineffective air raids on Gibraltar but Baudouin noted, "the attack on our fleet is one thing, war is another". As sceptics had warned, there were also complications with the French empire; when French colonial forces defeated de Gaulle's Free French Forces at the Battle of Dakar in September 1940, Germany responded by permitting Vichy France to maintain its remaining ships armed, rather than demobilised. On 24 September Gibraltar was bombed by sixty Vichy French aircraft, which dropped 45 long tons (46 t) of bombs. That night, another 81 bombers dropped 60 long tons (61 t) of bombs. The French 2nd Destroyer Division comprising Fougueux, Frondeur, Épée and Fleuret had sailed from Casablanca on 24 September and in the early hours of 25 September encountered the destroyer Hotspur patrolling off Gibraltar. Épée opened fire but its 13 cm (5.1 in) guns broke down after firing fourteen shells, Fleuret did not open fire because it could not get on target and the other French destroyers fired six shots between them. Hotspur returned fire but this was not reported by the French ships.

On 27 September Force H stayed at sea after receiving "a charming message [that] the whole of the Toulon fleet was coming out to have a scrap with us" but the two navies adhered to a tacit understanding that the British did not attack more powerful French forces at sea or ships in port but intercepted other French ships,

Though British commanders had precise instructions regarding the interception of French shipping, discretion might prove the better part of valour if Vichy escorts were liable to inflict serious loss.

In the autumn, the French sent a convoy through the Strait of Gibraltar untroubled, a state of affairs that rarely changed during the Mediterranean Campaign.

==== Gibraltarian civilians ====
In early June 1940, about 13,500 civilians had been evacuated from Gibraltar to Casablanca in French Morocco. Following the capitulation of the French to the Germans and the attack on Mers-el-Kébir, the Vichy government found their presence an embarrassment. Later in June, 15 British cargo vessels arrived in Casablanca under Commodore Crichton, repatriating 15,000 French servicemen who had been rescued from Dunkirk. Once the French troops had disembarked, the ships were interned until the Commodore agreed to take away the evacuees, who, reflecting tensions generated after the attack on Mers-el-Kébir, were escorted to the ships at bayonet point, minus many of their possessions.

==== Case Anton ====
On 19 November 1942, the Germans tried to capture the French fleet based at Toulon, against the armistice terms, as part of Case Anton, the military occupation of Vichy France by Germany. All ships of any military value were scuttled by the French before the arrival of German troops, notably Dunkerque, Strasbourg and seven (four heavy and three light) modern cruisers. For many in the French Navy this was a final proof that there had never been a question of their ships ending up in German hands and that the British action at Mers-el-Kébir had been unnecessary. Darlan was true to his promise in 1940, that French ships would not be allowed to fall into German hands. Godfroy, still in command of the French ships neutralised at Alexandria, remained aloof for a while longer but on 17 May 1943 joined the Allies.

== Orders of battle ==
=== British ===
Fleet Air Arm squadrons embarked in Ark Royal
Name	Flag	Type	Notes
800 Naval Air Squadron	Royal Navy	Skua	Two shot down
810 Naval Air Squadron	Royal Navy	Swordfish	
818 Naval Air Squadron	Royal Navy	Swordfish	

Force H
Ship	Flag	Type	Notes
HMS Ark Royal	Royal Navy	Aircraft carrier	Force H
HMS Hood	Royal Navy	Admiral-class battlecruiser	Force H (Flagship)
HMS Resolution	Royal Navy	Revenge-class battleship	Force H
HMS Valiant	Royal Navy	Queen Elizabeth-class battleship	Force H
HMS Arethusa	Royal Navy	Arethusa-class cruiser	Force H
HMS Enterprise	Royal Navy	Emerald-class cruiser	Force H
HMS Active	Royal Navy	A-class destroyer	13th Destroyer Flotilla
HMS Escort	Royal Navy	E-class destroyer	8th Destroyer Flotilla
HMS Faulknor	Royal Navy	F-class destroyer	8th Destroyer Flotilla
HMS Fearless	Royal Navy	F-class destroyer	8th Destroyer Flotilla
HMS Foresight	Royal Navy	F-class destroyer	8th Destroyer Flotilla
HMS Forester	Royal Navy	F-class destroyer	8th Destroyer Flotilla
HMS Foxhound	Royal Navy	F-class destroyer	8th Destroyer Flotilla
HMS Keppel	Royal Navy	Thorneycroft destroyer leader	13th Destroyer Flotilla
HMS Vidette	Royal Navy	V-class destroyer	13th Destroyer Flotilla
HMS Vortigern	Royal Navy	V-class destroyer	13th Destroyer Flotilla
HMS Wrestler	Royal Navy	W-class destroyer	13th Destroyer Flotilla

=== French ships at Oran ===
Marine Nationale
Ship	Flag	Type	Notes
Dunkerque	French Navy	Dunkerque-class battleship	1st line division Force de Raid (Flagship)
Strasbourg	French Navy	Dunkerque-class battleship	1st line division Force de Raid
Bretagne	French Navy	Bretagne-class battleship	2nd line division Force de Raid
Provence	French Navy	Bretagne-class battleship	2nd line division Force de Raid
Commandant Teste	French Navy	Large seaplane tender	Aircraft transporter
Bordelais	French Navy	L'Adroit-class destroyer	2nd Light Squadron, 8th Destroyer Division
Boulonnais	French Navy	L'Adroit-class destroyer	2nd Light Squadron, 5th Destroyer Division
Brestois	French Navy	L'Adroit-class destroyer	2nd Light Squadron, 5th Destroyer Division
Kersaint	French Navy	Vauquelin-class destroyer	2nd Light Squadron, 10th Scout Division
La Bayonnaise	French Navy	La Melpomène-class torpedo boat	2nd Light Squadron, 13th Destroyer Division
La Poursuivante	French Navy	La Melpomène-class torpedo boat	2nd Light Squadron, 13th Destroyer Division
Le Terrible	French Navy	Le Fantasque-class destroyer	2nd Light Squadron, 9th Scout Division
Lynx	French Navy	Chacal-class destroyer	2nd Light Squadron, 4th Scout Division
Mogador	French Navy	Mogador-class destroyer	2nd Light Squadron, 6th Scout Division
Rigault de Genouilly	French Navy	Bougainville-class aviso	2nd Light Squadron
Tigre	French Navy	Chacal-class destroyer	2nd Light Squadron, 4th Scout Division
Tornade	French Navy	Bourrasque-class destroyer	2nd Light Squadron, 7th Destroyer Division
Tramontane	French Navy	Bourrasque-class destroyer	2nd Light Squadron, 7th Destroyer Division
Trombe	French Navy	Bourrasque-class destroyer	2nd Light Squadron, 8th Destroyer Division
Typhon	French Navy	Bourrasque-class destroyer	2nd Light Squadron, 7th Destroyer Division
Volta	French Navy	Mogador-class destroyer	2nd Light Squadron, 6th Scout Division
Ariane	French Navy	Ariane-class submarine	2nd Submarine Squadron
Danaé	French Navy	Ariane-class submarine	2nd Submarine Squadron
Diane	French Navy	Diane-class submarine	2nd Submarine Squadron
Eurydice	French Navy	Ariane-class submarine	2nd Submarine Squadron

== See also ==
- Attack on Pearl Harbor
- Battle of Taranto
- Naval Battle of Casablanca
