= Ginocchio towed torpedo =

- Place of origin: France

Service history
- Used by: France
- Wars: World War II

Specifications
- Mass: 62 kg (137 lb) or; 75.5 kg (166 lb)
- Length: 1.62 m (5 ft 4 in) or; 1.72 m (5 ft 8 in)
- Warhead: Trinitrotolulene (TNT)
- Warhead weight: 30 kg (66 lb)
- Detonation mechanism: inertial fuze
- Maximum depth: 53 m (174 ft)
- Steering system: towed
- Launch platform: Ship

The Ginocchio towed torpedo was based on an Italian concept of World War I and consisted of a towed torpedo that was streamed over the stern near a submarine contact in the hope that it would strike the submarine, triggering its warhead. Depth-keeping proved to be a problem during sea trials and it does not appear to have ever been operationally used.

== Development and description ==
The French began development on the Ginocchio, based on a wartime Italian concept, during the 1920s, but depth-keeping was erratic and the project was formally suspended in 1933 after trials in the Chacal and Bourrasque-class destroyers. The project was revived in late 1938 for the ships of the latter class, but was cancelled in October 1939.

The Ginocchio came in two models, both of which had a 30-kilogram (66 lb) warhead of Trinitrotolulene.

- The "medium" had a depth capability of 15 to 37 meters (49 to 121 ft); it weighed 62 kilograms (137 lb) and was 1.62 meters (5 ft 4 in) long.
- The "depth" model had a maximum depth of 53 meters (174 ft), weighed 75.5 kilograms (166 lb) and was 1.72 meters (5 ft 8 in) long.
