= French destroyer Léopard =

French Navy's Chacal-class destroyer

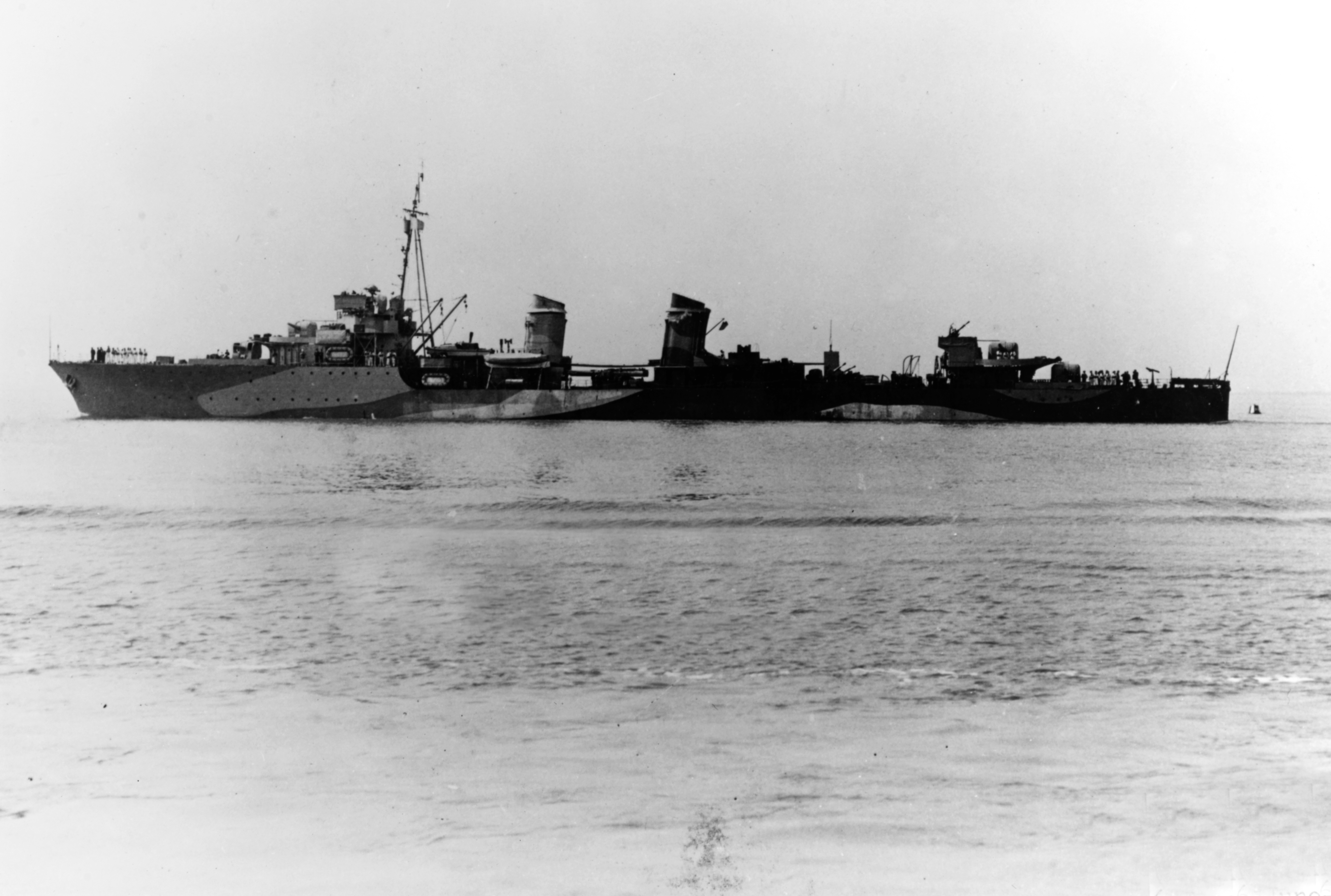
- Léopard at anchor, 6 June 1942

History

France
- Name: Léopard
- Namesake: Leopard
- Builder: Ateliers et Chantiers de la Loire, Saint-Nazaire
- Laid down: 14 August 1923
- Launched: 29 September 1924
- Commissioned: 15 November 1927
- Honours and awards: Médaille de la Résistance with rosette, 29 November 1946
- Fate: Ran aground and wrecked, 27 May 1943

General characteristics (as built)
- Class & type: Chacal-class destroyer
- Displacement: 2,126 t (2,092 long tons) (standard); 2,980–3,075 t (2,933–3,026 long tons) (full load)
- Length: 126.8 m (416 ft 0.1 in)
- Beam: 11.1 m (36 ft 5.0 in)
- Draft: 4.1 m (13 ft 5.4 in)
- Installed power: 50,000 PS (37,000 kW; 49,000 shp); 5 du Temple boilers
- Propulsion: 2 shafts; 2 geared steam turbines
- Speed: 35.5 knots (65.7 km/h; 40.9 mph)
- Range: 3,000 nmi (5,600 km; 3,500 mi) at 15 knots (28 km/h; 17 mph)
- Crew: 12 officers, 209 crewmen (wartime)
- Armament: 5 × single 130 mm (5.1 in) guns; 2 × single 75 mm (3.0 in) anti-aircraft guns; 2 × triple 550 mm (21.7 in) torpedo tubes; 2 chutes; four throwers for 46 depth charges

The French destroyer Léopard was a Chacal-class destroyer built for the French Navy during the 1920s. She became a training ship in the mid-1930s before serving as a convoy escort during World War II before the Germans invaded France in May 1940. After that time, she bombarded advancing German forces near the northern French coast and took part in the Dunkirk evacuation. After the surrender of France, she was seized by the British in July and turned over to the Free French.

Léopard escorted convoys in the Western Approaches in 1940–41 before beginning a year-long conversion into an escort destroyer. She helped to sink a German submarine before liberating the island of La Réunion in late 1942. She ran aground near Benghazi just a few weeks after being transferred to the Mediterranean in mid-1943. Salvage attempts failed and her wreck was abandoned after it broke in half.

== Design and description ==
The Chacal-class ships were designed to counter the large Italian Leone-class destroyers. They had an overall length of 126.8 meters (416 ft 0 in), a beam of 11.1 meters (36 ft 5 in), and a draft of 4.1 meters (13 ft 5 in). The ships displaced 2,126 metric tons (2,092 long tons) at standard and 2,980–3,075 metric tons (2,933–3,026 long tons) at deep load. They were powered by two geared steam turbines, each driving one propeller shaft, using steam provided by five du Temple boilers. The turbines were designed to produce 50,000 metric horsepower (37,000 kW; 49,000 shp), which would propel the ship at 35.5 knots (65.7 km/h; 40.9 mph). During her sea trials on 12 May 1927, Léopard reached 35.59 knots (65.91 km/h; 40.96 mph) for a single hour. The ships carried 530 metric tons (522 long tons) of fuel oil which gave them a range of 3,000 nautical miles (5,600 km; 3,500 mi) at 15 knots (28 km/h; 17 mph). Their crew consisted of 10 officers and 187 crewmen in peacetime and 12 officers and 209 enlisted men in wartime.

The main armament of the Chacal-class ships consisted of five Canon de 130 mm Modèle 1919 guns in single mounts, one superfiring pair fore and aft of the superstructure and the fifth gun abaft the aft funnel. The guns were numbered '1' to '5' from front to rear. Their anti-aircraft armament consisted of two Canon de 75 mm modèle 1924 guns in single mounts positioned amidships. The ships carried two above-water triple sets of 550-millimeter (21.7 in) torpedo tubes. A pair of depth charge chutes were built into their stern; these housed a total of twenty 200-kilogram (440 lb) depth charges. They were also fitted with four depth-charge throwers for which they carried a dozen 100-kilogram (220 lb) depth charges.

== Construction and career ==
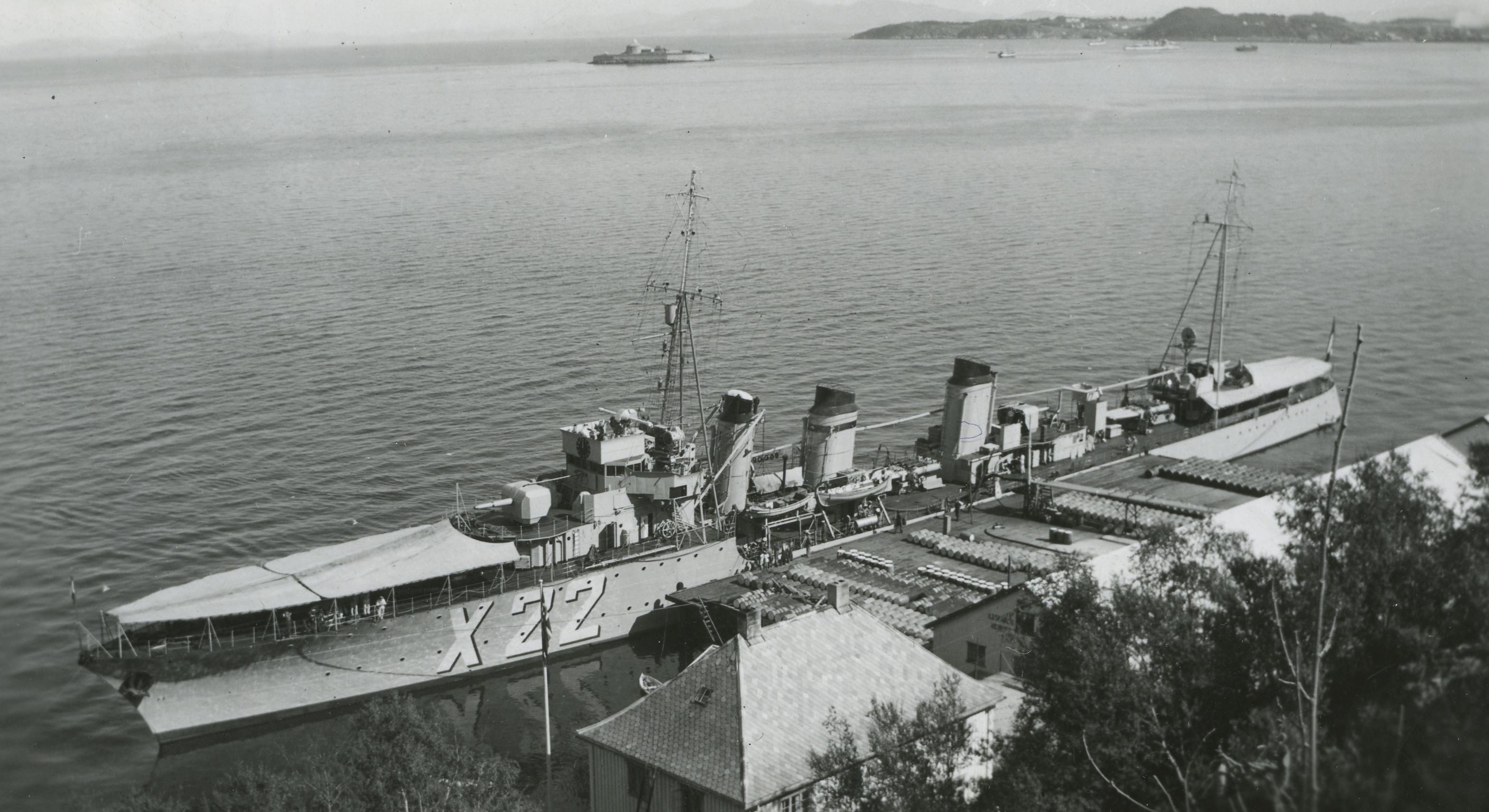
Léopard in 1939

Léopard, named after the eponymous feline, was ordered on 26 February 1923 from the Ateliers et Chantiers de la Loire. She was laid down on 14 August 1923 at their shipyard at Saint-Nazaire, launched on 29 September 1924, commissioned on 15 June 1927, completed on 13 October and entered service on 15 November. Completion was delayed by problems with her propulsion machinery and late deliveries by sub-contractors. Léopard was assigned to the 4th Light Division (Division légère) (DL) of the Second Squadron (2ème Escadre) based at Brest upon completion, together with her sister ships Lynx and Jaguar. The four depth charge throwers were removed in 1932. The next year, the ship was present when the fleet was reviewed by the President of France, Albert Lebrun, in Cherbourg on 20 July 1933. About a year later, the 75-millimeter guns were replaced by four twin mounts for 13.2-millimeter (0.5 in) anti-aircraft machineguns. On 15 July 1935, Léopard and her sister Chacal of the 8th DL were assigned to the Naval School (Ecole Navale) at Brest. On 12 April 1937, the 8th DL was redesignated as the 2nd Large Destroyer Division (2ème division de contre-torpeilleurs) (DCT); their sister Jaguar joined them in September.

=== World War II ===
By 7 September 1939, Léopard was no longer a part of the 2nd DCT and was assigned to the Western Command (Forces maritimes de l'Ouest) for convoy escort duties from October to May 1940 where she guarded convoys traveling between Gibraltar and Brest as well as Casablanca, French Morocco, and Le Verdon-sur-Mer. In early 1940, the ship had a British Type 123 ASDIC installed; in addition two depth-charge throwers were reinstalled, No. 3 gun removed, and her depth charge stowage reduced to a dozen 200 kg and eight 100 kg depth charges to improve her stability.

By 22 May Léopard was reassigned to the 2nd DCT when the unit was tasked to carry demolition teams to the northernmost French ports; the ship arrived at Boulogne-sur-Mer that evening. Together with Chacal and eight smaller destroyers, Léopard bombarded advancing German troops as they approached the defenses of Boulogne-sur-Mer, firing the last shots of the battle at midday on 24 May. On 28 May, a special flotilla was constituted under the command of Admiral Marcel Landriau, with his flag on the aviso Savorgnan de Brazza, with these ships and a number of smaller units to support the ongoing evacuation of Dunkirk. On 3 June, the contre-torpilleur rescued 19 British soldiers from a boat and delivered them to England.

In mid-June, Léopard defended the approaches to Cherbourg and sailed to Portsmouth on 19 June, after the port surrendered to the Germans. The ship was still there when Operation Catapult, a British operation to capture or disable the ships of the French Navy lest the Germans seize them and use them against the British, began on 3 July. She was handed over to the Free French Naval Forces on 31 August. Command of Léopard was given to Lieutenant (Lieutenant de vaisseau) Jules Évenou, who went by the nom de guerre of "Jacques Richard".

==== Service with the Free French ====
Léopard was commissioned by the Free French on 3 September although she was under repair until November as the British dockyards were very congested. During this time, the British took the opportunity to improve her anti-aircraft suite. A QF 4 in (102 mm) Mk V AA gun replaced the two 13.2 mm machinegun mounts on the platform abaft the rear funnel, the 13.2 mm guns on the forecastle were moved to positions abreast the fore funnel, and a pair of 2-pounder (40 mm) Mk II "pom-pom" light AA guns were added on platforms on the side of the forward superstructure. Upon the completion of this refit, she was assigned to convoy escort duties in the Western Approaches. On 24 February 1941, Léopard rescued 39 survivors of a British cargo ship.

On 8 May 1941, she began a lengthy conversion into an escort destroyer at Kingston upon Hull. Her forward boiler and its funnel were removed and replaced by additional oil storage and additional accommodation for her ratings. They reduced her maximum speed to 31.5 knots (58.3 km/h; 36.2 mph), but increased her fuel storage to 780 metric tons (770 long tons; 860 short tons) which raised her range to 4,200 nmi (7,800 km; 4,800 mi), and her crew to 234 ratings. Her troublesome depth charge chutes were sealed off and their machinery was removed; her stern had to be rebuilt to accommodate two rails at the stern, each with a dozen 251-kilogram (553 lb) Mk VIIH heavy depth charges, plus an additional four stored below decks. Her two existing depth charge throwers were replaced by four improved Thornycroft Mk IV throwers. The ship carried a total of twenty-four 191-kilogram (421 lb) Mk VII light depth charges for the throwers. To compensate for the weight of the additional depth charges, her aft torpedo tubes were removed. The 4-inch gun was replaced by a single 20-millimeter (0.8 in) Oerlikon light AA gun and two others replaced the "pom-pom"s. These were moved to positions on the upper deck that had formerly been occupied by the 75 mm guns and another gun was added on top of the aft superstructure. A pair of quadruple mounts for Vickers 0.5 in (12.7 mm) AA machineguns were added on the forward superstructure. A Type 291 search radar was also added.

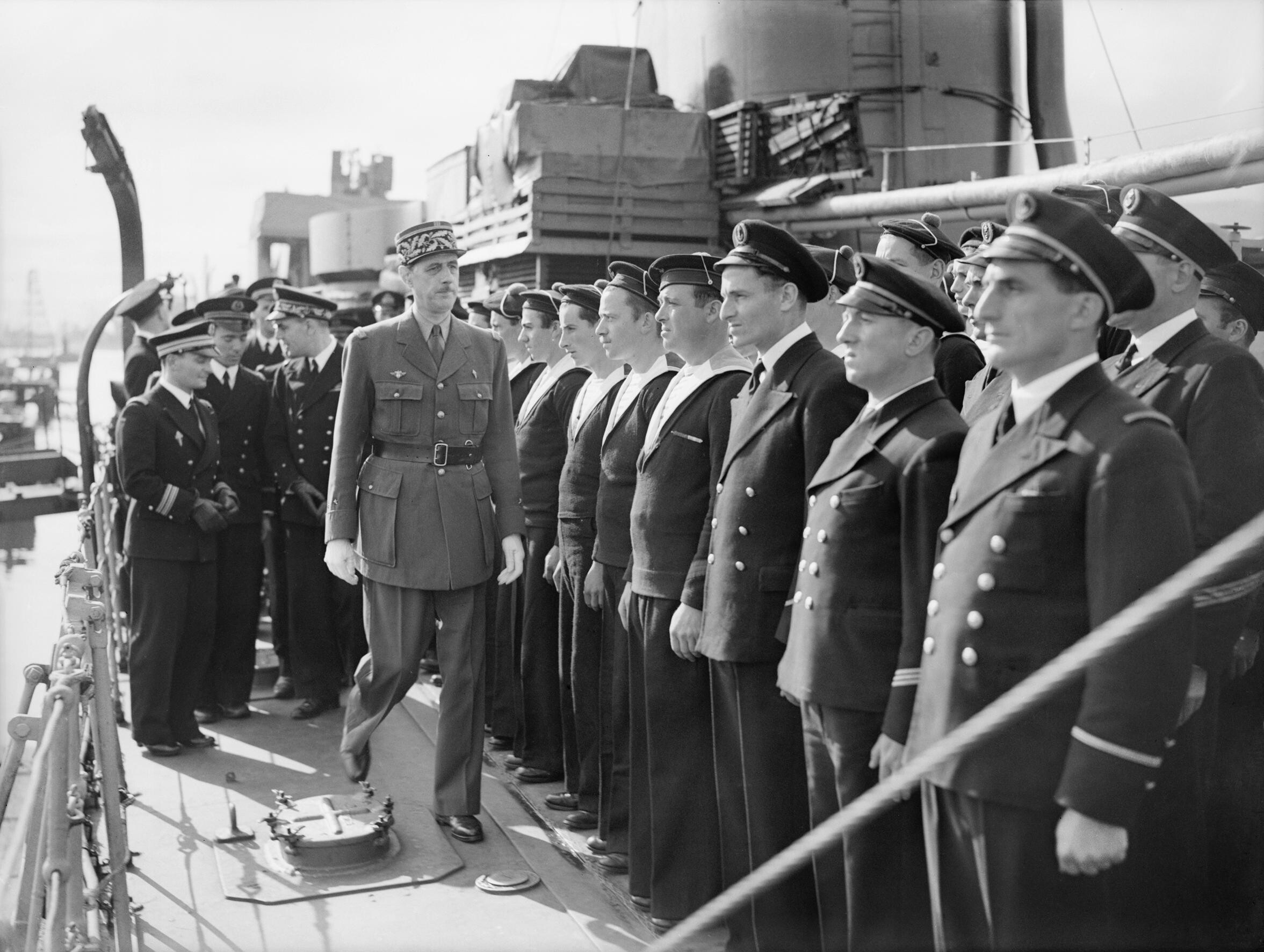
General Charles De Gaulle inspecting sailors aboard Léopard, 24 June 1942

While escorting Convoy OS33 on 11 July 1942, the frigate HMS Spey spotted the German submarine U-136 on the surface and made multiple attacks after the U-boat dived. Léopard joined her, as did the sloop HMS Pelican and they sank the submarine at coordinates 33°28′N 23°28′W. The next day Léopard collided with the sloop HMS Lowestoft and had her bow stove in by the British ship. She was repaired in South Africa in September–October.

==== Liberation of La Réunion ====
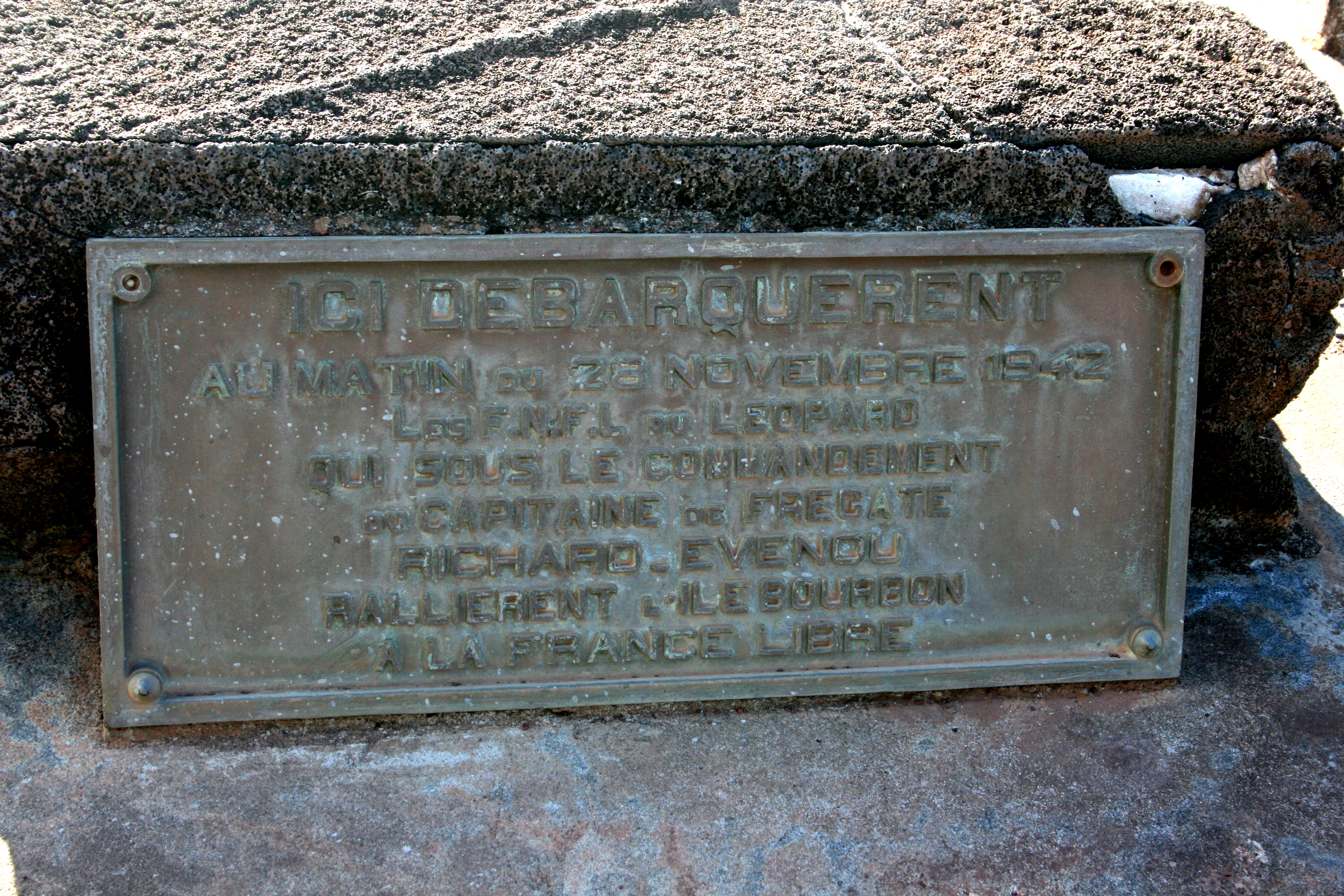
Commemorative plaque of the liberation of La Réunion

Léopard had been selected to convince the Vichy government of La Réunion to join the Free French in June, but the collision and her consequent repairs delayed her mission. On the night of 27/28 November, she arrived off the island with 80 troops aboard. They were landed successfully and seized control of Saint-Denis, Réunion, the island's capital, although the governor fled into the interior. A coast-defense battery engaged the contre-torpilleur and she fired back, with men killed on both sides. The Vichy hold-outs surrendered on the 30th and Léopard remained in the Indian Ocean escorting convoys until March 1943.

She was briefly refitted at Diégo-Suarez, Madagascar from 13 March to mid-April when she was transferred to the Mediterranean. Léopard arrived in Alexandria, Egypt, on 12 May and screened a convoy to Malta shortly afterwards. She departed on 24 May with a convoy returning to Alexandria and accidentally ran aground near Benghazi three days later after aerial attacks disrupted the convoy. The Allies attempted to refloat her by sealing damaged areas between her bilges with cement and dredging a channel back to the sea. The weather soured and the wreck broke in two in a gale on 19 June and was declared a total loss on 1 July.
