= Chacal-class destroyer =

French destroyer class

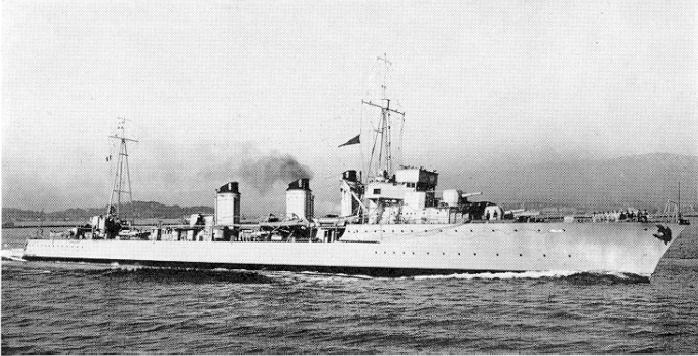
- Chacal before 1940

Class overview
- Name: Chacal or Jaguar
- Operators: French Navy
- Succeeded by: Guépard class
- Completed: 6
- Lost: 5
- Scrapped: 1

General characteristics (as built)
- Type: Large destroyer
- Displacement: 2,126 t (2,092 long tons) (standard); 2,980–3,075 t (2,933–3,026 long tons) (full load)
- Length: 126.8 m (416 ft 0.1 in)
- Beam: 11.1 m (36 ft 5.0 in)
- Draft: 4.1 m (13 ft 5.4 in)
- Installed power: 50,000 PS (37,000 kW; 49,000 shp); 5 du Temple boilers
- Propulsion: 2 shafts; 2 geared steam turbines
- Speed: 35.5 knots (65.7 km/h; 40.9 mph)
- Range: 3,000 nmi (5,600 km; 3,500 mi) at 15 knots (28 km/h; 17 mph)
- Crew: 12 officers, 209 crewmen (wartime)
- Armament: 5 × single 130 mm (5.1 in) guns; 2 × single 75 mm (3.0 in) AA guns; 2 × triple 550 mm (21.7 in) torpedo tubes; 2 chutes, four throwers for 46 depth charges

The Chacal-class destroyer, sometimes known as the Jaguar class, were a group of six large destroyers (contre-torpilleurs) built for the French Navy during the 1920s. Their primary role was scouting for the battleline. All were named for predators: Chacal means jackal, and the other five were named for big cats.

The ships were initially split between the Mediterranean Squadron and the Second Squadron (2ème Escadre), based at Brest. One ship served as a flagship during the 1930s, but her sister ships were assigned as training ships beginning in 1932. The Chacal class was assigned convoy escort duties after the start of World War II in September 1939 until three of them were committed to the English Channel after the Battle of France began on 10 May 1940. Two of these were sunk shortly afterwards by German forces.

When France surrendered on 22 June, two ships were in French Algeria, one was refitting in Toulon and the last ship was in England. During Operation Catapult in July, an attack on the Vichy Fleet intended to prevent it from being turned over to the Germans, the British seized the ship in England, but failed to prevent the two in Mers-el-Kébir from escaping to Toulon when they attacked the port.

All three of the ships in Toulon were placed in reserve and two of them were captured virtually intact when the Germans attempted to seize the French fleet in November 1942. They were turned over to the Royal Italian Navy (Regia Marina), but they were only used for transport missions before Italy surrendered in September 1943. The Italians scuttled one, but the other escaped to join the Free French and spent the remainder of the war as a convoy escort in the Mediterranean or protecting Allied forces in the Ligurian Sea.

In the meantime, the British had turned Léopard over to the Free French who used her as a convoy escort before she helped to liberate the island of La Réunion in late 1942. She ran aground shortly after being transferred to the Mediterranean in mid-1943 and became a total loss. The only ship to survive the war, Tigre, was mostly used after the war as a troop transport and as a training ship until she was struck from the Navy List in 1954 before being scrapped the next year.

== Background ==
Right-elevation line drawing of Jaguar

Preliminary studies for large destroyers capable of defending the French battleline against attacks by enemy destroyers and torpedo boats by the Naval General Staff (NGS) began before World War I, but were suspended when the war began. They resumed in 1917, but serious planning did not begin until after the war when the NGS decided to split the role of the destroyer in 1919. The smaller torpilleur d'escadre would have the role of attacking the enemy's battleline with torpedoes and defending that of the French from enemy torpedo craft. The primary role of the larger contre-torpilleur was scouting; defending the battleline was secondary and attacking the enemy battleline least important. This required high speed in all weather, good endurance and a powerful armament capable of engaging small cruisers.

The Naval Minister selected a 1,780-metric-ton (1,750-long-ton) design, armed with five 100-millimeter (3.9 in) guns, in early 1920, but this was rejected by the French Parliament. Influenced by the large Italian Leone-class destroyers, armed with eight 120-millimeter (4.7 in), and the 2,060-metric-ton (2,030-long-ton) ex-German destroyer SMS S113, turned over to France as war reparations, that was armed with four 150-millimeter (5.9 in) guns, the French went back to the drawing board for a much larger ship armed with six or seven of the new Canon de 130 mm Modèle 1919 gun. Ordering was delayed by the negotiations during the Washington Naval Treaty, but six ships of the Chacal class were approved as part of the 1922 Naval Law.

== Description ==
They had an overall length of 126.8 meters (416 ft 0 in), a beam of 11.1 meters (36 ft 5 in), and a draft of 4.1 meters (13 ft 5 in). The ships displaced 2,126 metric tons (2,092 long tons) at standard load and 2,980–3,075 metric tons (2,933–3,026 long tons) at deep load. A double bottom covered most of the ships' length and the hull was subdivided by 11 transverse bulkheads into a dozen watertight compartments. Their crew consisted of 10 officers and 187 crewmen in peacetime and 12 officers and 209 enlisted men in wartime.

The raised forecastle and the prominent sheer and flare of the bow ensured that the Chacal-class ships were good seaboats, but they proved to be topheavy with poor lateral stability despite 40-meter-long (130 ft) bilge keels. Furthermore, they were not very maneuverable because the 14.44-square-meter (155.4 sq ft) rudder was too small and its servomotor too weak (taking 25–30 seconds to move from one side to the other).

The Chacal class was powered by two geared steam turbine sets, each driving a 3.6-meter (11 ft 10 in) propeller, using steam provided by five du Temple boilers that operated at a pressure of 18 kg/cm^{2} (1,765 kPa; 256 psi) and a temperature of 216 °C (421 °F). Four ships were fitted with Rateau-Bretagne turbines that were satisfactory once the initial teething problems were worked out, but Léopard and Lynx used Breguet-Laval turbines that were very troublesome and caused Léopard to enter service two years late. The turbines were designed to produce 50,000 metric horsepower (37,000 kW; 49,000 shp), which would propel the ships at 35.5 knots (65.7 km/h; 40.9 mph). During their sea trials, the turbines generated 54,850–57,810 metric horsepower (40,340–42,520 kW; 54,100–57,020 shp) and they reached a maximum speed of 36.7 knots (68.0 km/h; 42.2 mph) for a single hour. The ships carried 530 metric tons (522 long tons) of fuel oil which gave them a range of 3,000 nautical miles (5,600 km; 3,500 mi) at 15 knots (28 km/h; 17 mph). Fuel consumption at high speeds was excessive and the range was only 600 nmi (1,100 km; 690 mi) at 35 knots (65 km/h; 40 mph). The ships were fitted with two 60-kilowatt (80 hp) turbo generators in the forward engine room. In addition, two diesel generators, one of 30-kilowatt (40 hp) and the other of 15-kilowatt (20 hp) capacity, were located in the central superstructure.

=== Armament ===
The main armament of the Chacal-class ships was originally intended to be mounted in a mix of single and twin mounts, but the twin-gun mounts proved unsatisfactory so the ships were armed with five 40-caliber Canon de 130 mm mle 1919 guns in single mounts, one superfiring pair each fore and aft of the superstructure and the fifth gun abaft the aft funnel. The guns were numbered '1' to '5' from front to rear. The mounts had a range of elevation from -10° to +36°, which gave the gun a range of 18,900 meters (20,700 yd) at maximum elevation, and the guns could be loaded at any angle below +16°. They fired 32.05-kilogram (70.7 lb) armor-piercing projectiles at a muzzle velocity of 735 m/s (2,410 ft/s) at a rate of five to six rounds per minute. The fore and aft magazines had a total capacity of 802 shells. Each mount had a ready rack holding 24 shells, except for No. 3, which had a larger supply of 30 rounds because it lacked an ammunition hoist down to the magazines.

The NGS deemed this gun obsolete shortly after the first ships were laid down, but the gun that it wanted to use, the Canon de 138 mm modèle 1923, was not yet available, so they planned to replace the 130 mm guns later. The guns and their larger hoists were ordered well before any of the ships were completed and had to be written off when it became apparent that the ships' stability was too marginal to tolerate the additional top weight.

The initial plan was to fit each ship with a director that fed data to the Mle 1923B electro-mechanical fire-control computer, but development was protracted and it was not ready in time for the first four ships. They were fitted with the simpler Mle 1919 type aviso mechanical computer; only Léopard and Lynx had the Mle 1923B computer upon completion. The earlier ships had their Mle 1919 computers replaced by the later computer beginning in 1927. Development of the director was abandoned and the ships were fitted with a 3-meter (9 ft 10 in) Mle B.1926 coincidence rangefinder that fed data to the computers. This was replaced by a stereoscopic rangefinder in 1931 and by a 5-meter (16 ft 5 in) PC.1936 model from 1937.

The anti-aircraft armament of the Chacal class consisted of two 50-caliber Canon de 75 mm modèle 1924 guns in single mounts positioned amidships. The mounts could elevate to +90° and depress to -10° and the guns could be loaded at any angle up to +75°. Their 5.93-kilogram (13.1 lb) shells were fired at a muzzle velocity of 850 m/s (2,800 ft/s). The guns had a range of 14,100 meters (15,400 yd) and a ceiling of about 10,000 meters (33,000 ft). They had a theoretical rate of fire of 15 rounds per minute, but only about half that in service. The ships carried 150 rounds, plus 60 star shells, for each gun, of which 30 rounds could be stowed in ready-use lockers. In 1932, the navy decided that the ships were too top-heavy to accept a director for the guns so they were to be replaced by four twin mounts for Hotchkiss 13.2-millimeter (0.5 in) anti-aircraft machineguns. These were installed in 1933–34, together with a dedicated 1-meter (3 ft 3 in) OPL J.1930 stereoscopic rangefinder. The substitution saved about 12 metric tons (12 long tons) of weight, although the machineguns proved to have limited utility in combat. Combat operations in 1939 had shown the French that their anti-aircraft defenses were inadequate and they planned to augment them beginning in 1940 by replacing the mainmast with a platform for a twin-gun mount for the 37 mm (1.5 in) light AA gun. This was only installed aboard Panthère before the armistice with Germany and it was removed shortly afterwards.

The Chacal-class ships carried two above-water triple sets of 550-millimeter (21.7 in) torpedo tubes. Their Mle 1919D torpedoes had a 238-kilogram (525 lb), picric-acid warhead and could be set for a speed of 35 knots with a range of 6,000 meters (6,600 yd) or 25 knots (46 km/h; 29 mph) for 14,000 meters (15,000 yd). A pair of depth charge chutes were built into their stern; these housed a total of twenty Guiraud Mle 1922 200-kilogram (440 lb) depth charges. They were also fitted with four depth-charge throwers abreast the fore funnel for which they carried a dozen Guiraud Mle 1922 100-kilogram (220 lb) depth charges. The four depth charge throwers were removed in 1932 as they were badly positioned and their charges tended to cause leaks in the hull when used, although two were reinstalled after the war began in 1939. Space and weight was reserved for a pair of Ginocchio towed anti-submarine torpedoes, but these were a failure and were never used in combat.

Space was reserved for an unsuccessful French sonar system that was cancelled in September 1930. The NGS also intended to fit a passive Walser acoustic locator system in the Chacal class, but only Panthère was actually fitted with one. This consisted of a set of two steel lenses, one set on each side of the ship, with a large number of diaphragms that ambient amplified sound for the operator. This proved useless while the ship was moving faster than dead slow and was removed in 1931. The Walser compartment was reused when a British Type 123 ASDIC system was installed aboard the ships in 1939–40, although Panthère did not receive one.

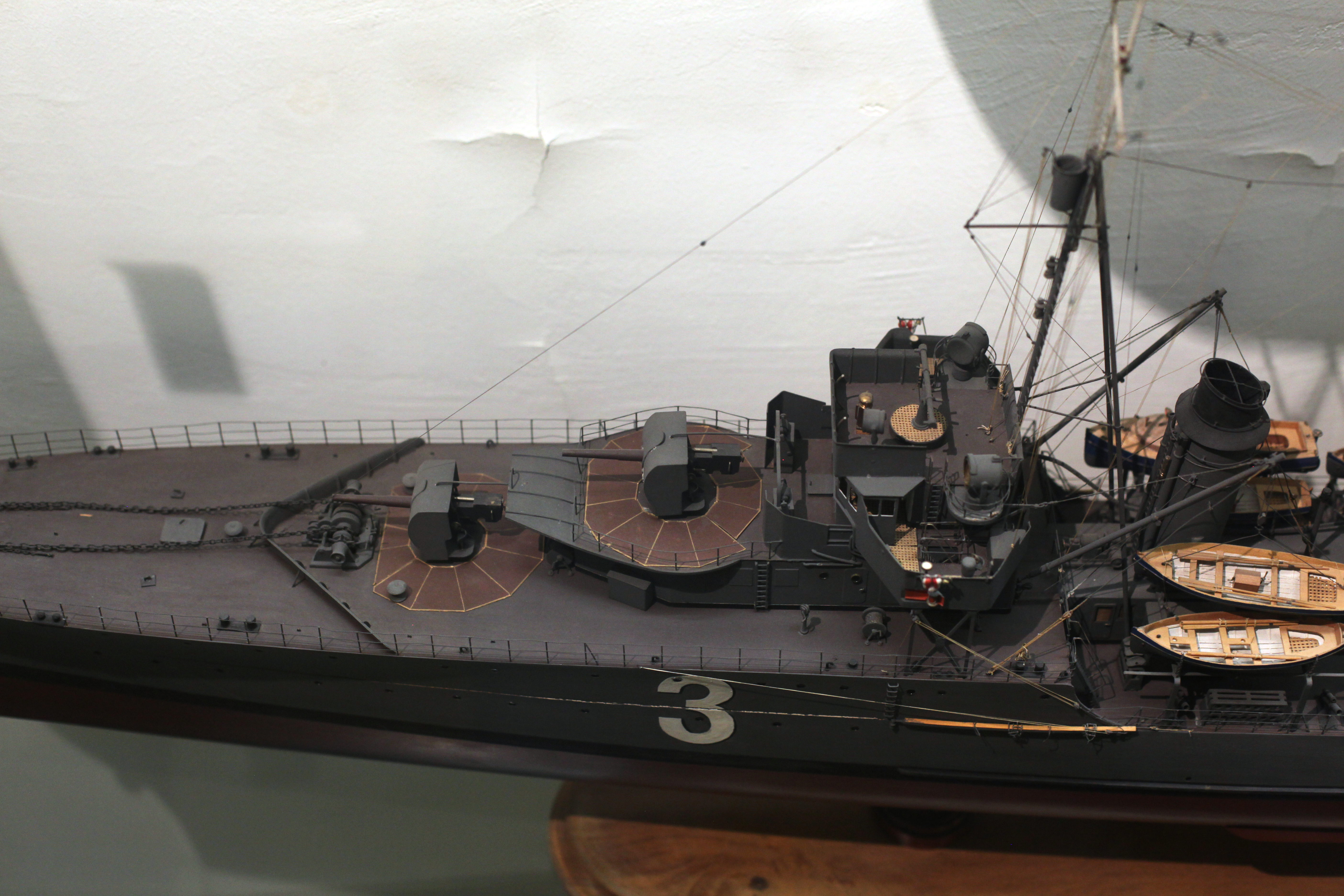
Forward 130 mm guns in superfiring single mounts 130 mm (5.1 in) Mle 1919 guns, main telemeter and searchlights on top of the bridge

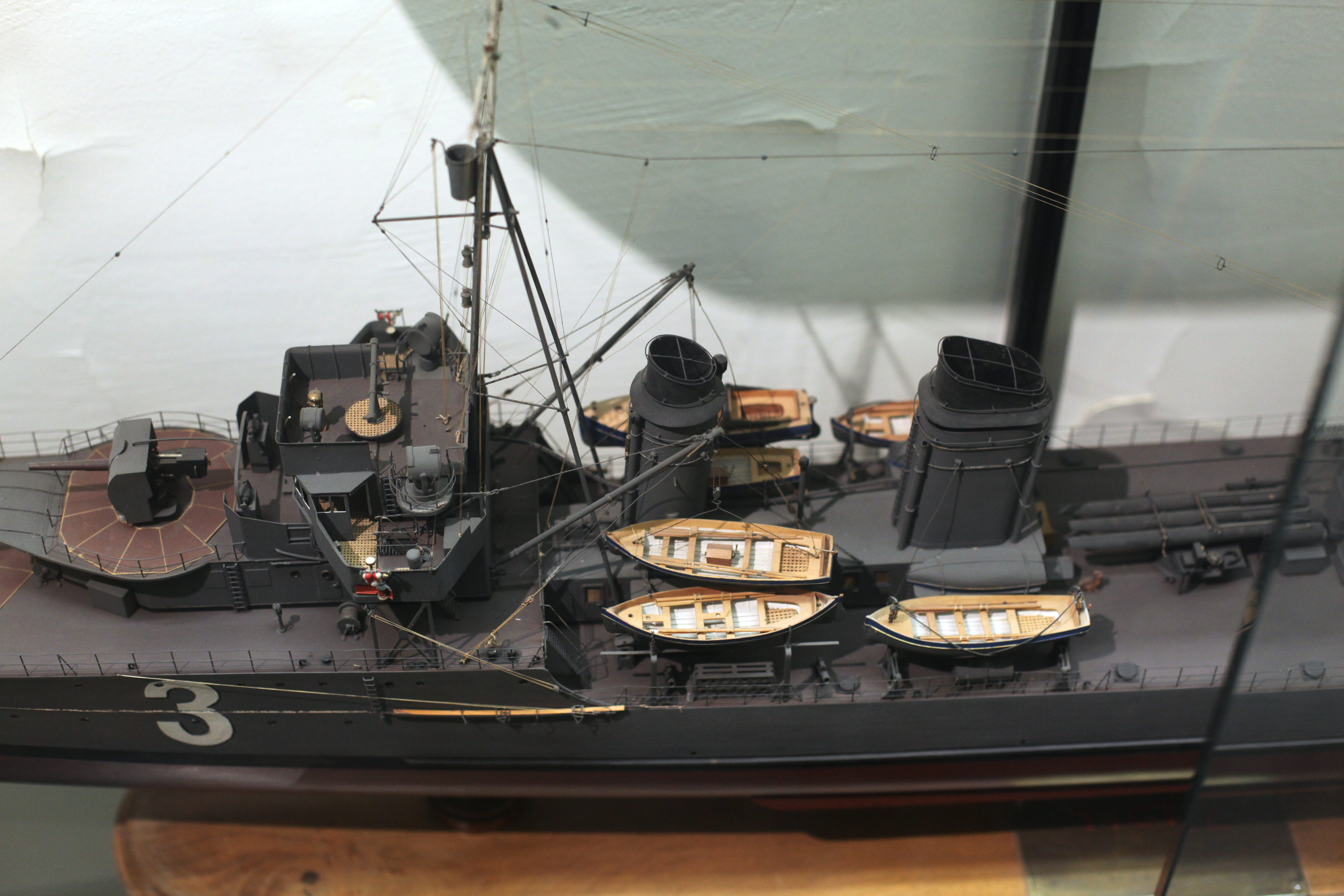
Forward triple torpedo tube behind the funnel

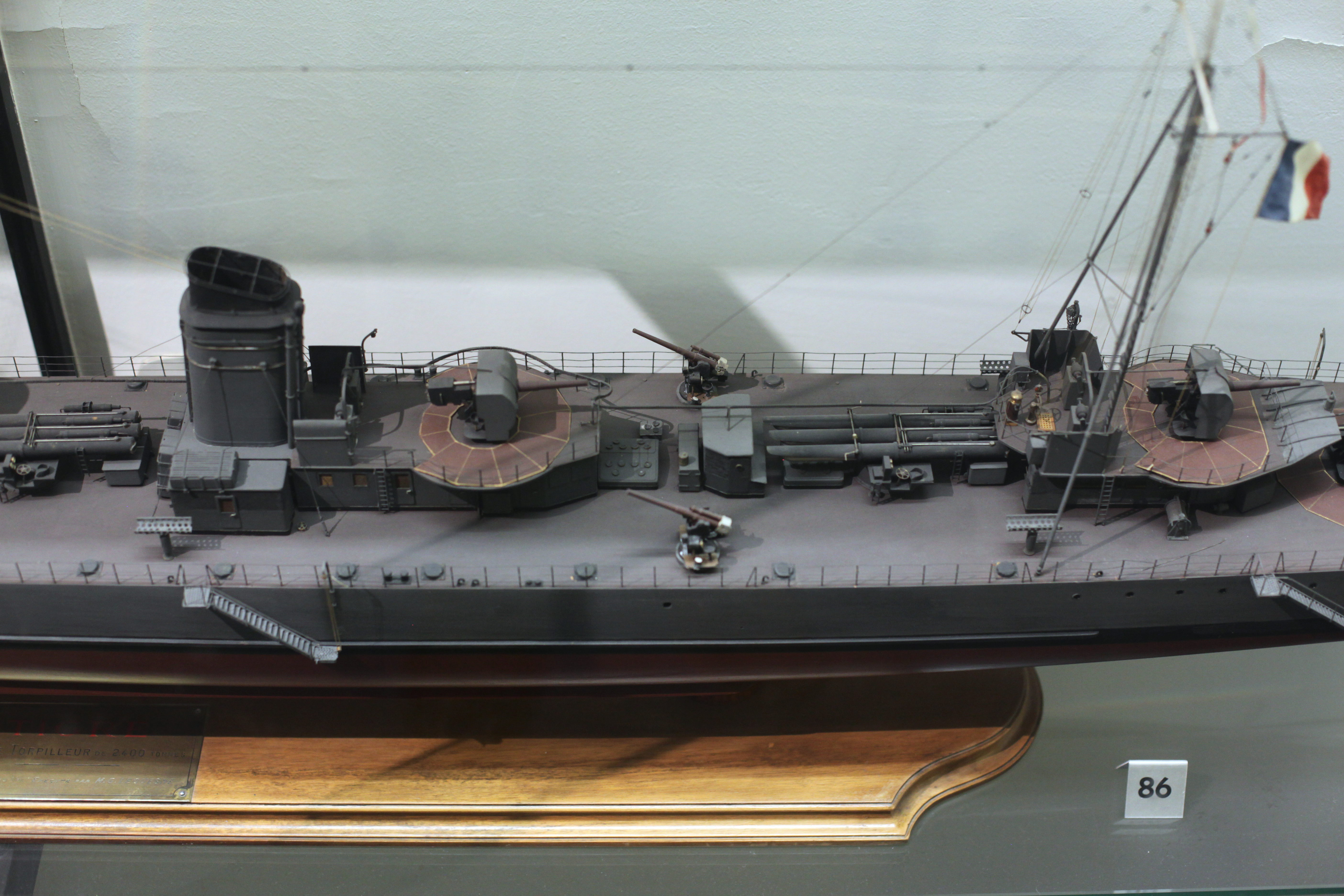
Mid-section, with the middle 130mm gun, two anti-air canons de 75 mm modèle 1924, and rear torpedo tubes

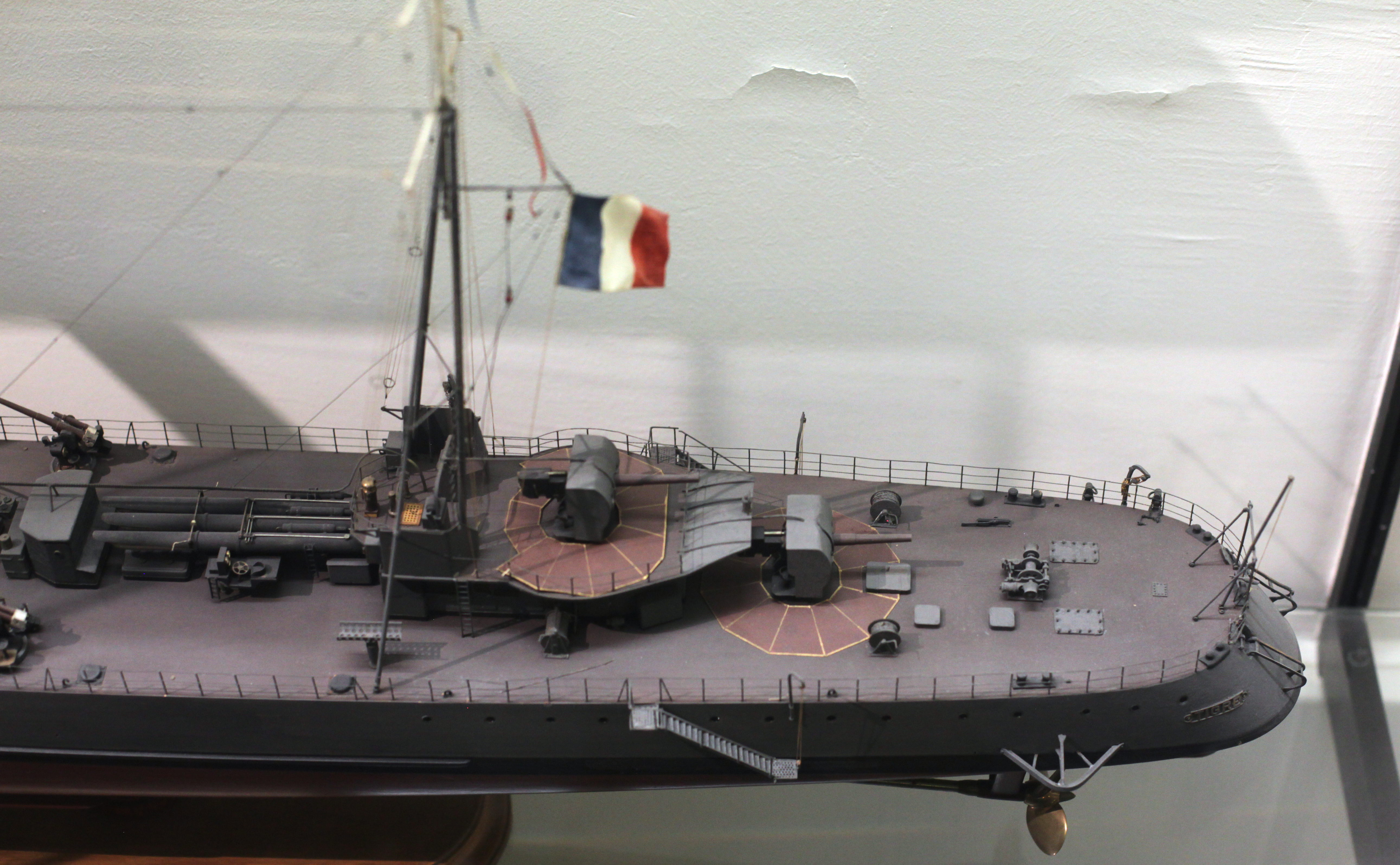
Stern, with the aft 130 mm guns in superfiring single mounts

== Ships ==
Construction data
Ship	Builder	Laid down	Launched	Commissioned	Fate
Chacal	Ateliers et Chantiers de Penhoët, Saint-Nazaire	18 September 1923	27 September 1924	12 June 1926	Sunk off Boulogne-sur-Mer by German aircraft, 24 May 1940
Jaguar	Arsenal de Lorient	24 August 1922	17 November 1923	24 July 1926	Beached and wrecked after torpedoed by a German E-boat near Dunkirk, 23 May 1940
Léopard	Ateliers et Chantiers de la Loire, Saint-Nazaire	14 August 1923	29 September 1924	10 October 1927	Run aground and wrecked, 27 May 1943
Lynx	Ateliers et Chantiers de la Loire, Saint-Nazaire	14 January 1924	25 February 1925	10 October 1927	Scuttled at Toulon, 27 November 1942
Panthère	Arsenal de Lorient	23 December 1923	27 October 1924	10 October 1926	Scuttled by Italy, 9 September 1943
Tigre	Ateliers et Chantiers de Bretagne, Nantes	28 September 1923	2 August 1924	1 February 1926	Scrapped, 1955

== Service ==
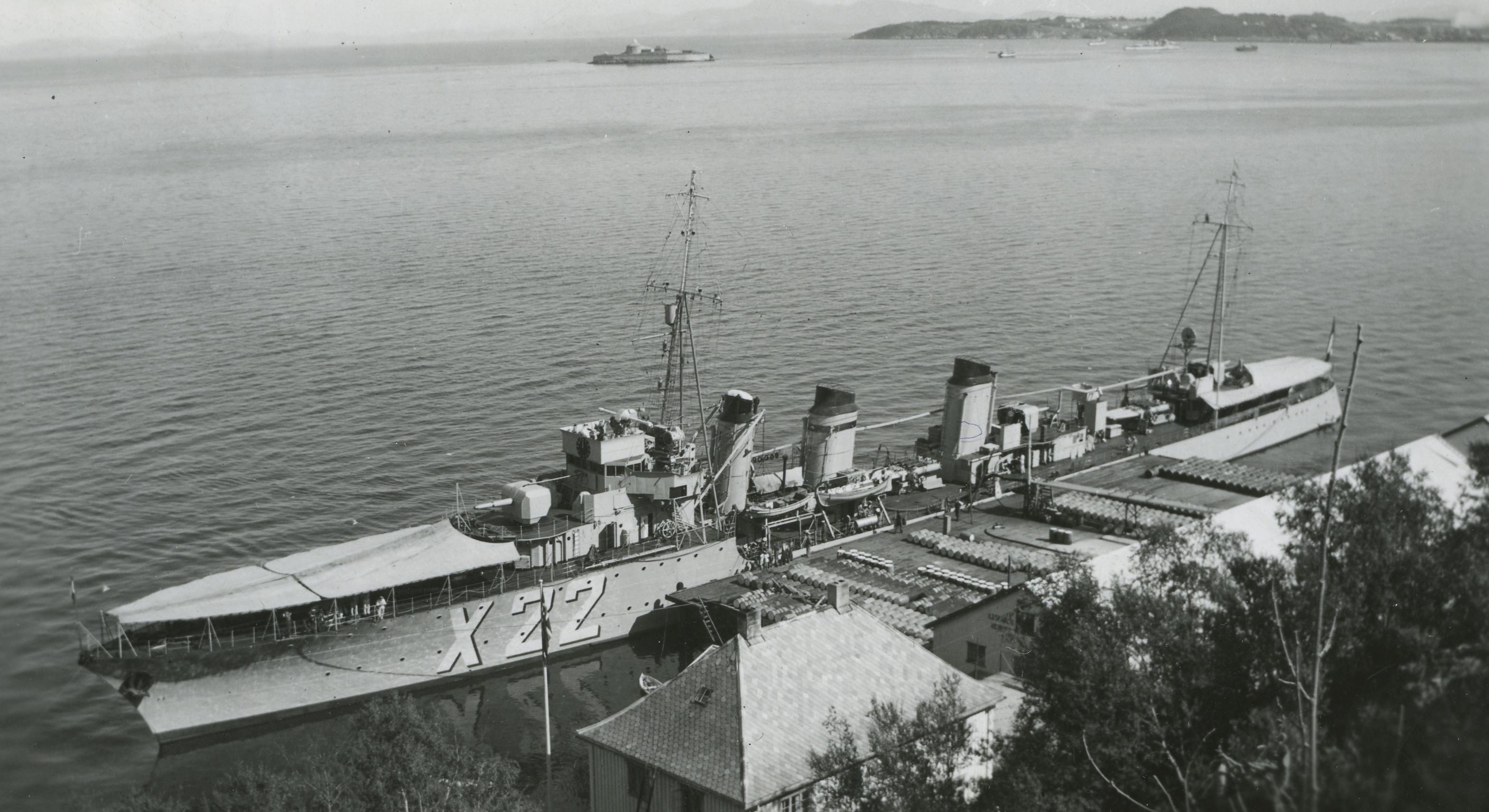
Léopard in 1939

The first three ships to be commissioned, Tigre, Chacal, and Panthère, were assigned to the Mediterranean Squadron at Toulon, and the last three were assigned to the Second Squadron (2ème Escadre) at Brest. The ships made many port visits and participated in several naval reviews during the 1920s and early 1930s. Several even made visits to French West Africa and the French West Indies in the early 1930s. Jaguar served as the flagship of several different destroyer (torpilleur d'escadre) flotillas from 1928 to 1937. The Chacal-class ships started to become dedicated training ships beginning in 1932 and continued to do so until the beginning of World War II.

Jaguar, Léopard and Panthère were assigned to the Northern Command (Forces maritimes du Nord) on 7 September in anticipation of a German invasion of Belgium. They proved, however, to be too large and unmaneuverable for operations in the shallow waters of the English Channel and North Sea; Panthère ran aground on 10 September in poor visibility, but suffered only minor damage, and Jaguar did the same thing on the night of 28/29 October. The contre-torpilleurs were relieved by smaller torpilleurs d'escadre beginning in mid-October. The other ships were assigned to the Western Command (Forces maritimes de l'Ouest) for convoy escort duties from October 1939 to May 1940 where they guarded convoys traveling between Gibraltar and Brest as well as Casablanca, French Morocco, and Le Verdon-sur-Mer. They were joined by the first three ships as they were replaced in the Northern Command. Jaguar was badly damaged during a collision with a British destroyer in January 1940 and her repairs were not completed until early May.

When the Germans invaded France on 10 May 1940, Panthère was being refitted at Toulon and her sisters were still escorting convoys. Jaguar, Léopard and Chacal were assigned to the Northern Command on 22 May to support Allied forces on the French coast. Jaguar was sunk the next day off Dunkirk and Chacal on the evening of 23/24 May near Boulogne by German bombers. Léopard remained in the area and bombarded advancing German forces near the northern French coast. After the surrender of France, she was seized by the British in July and turned over to the Free French the following month.

Léopard escorted convoys in the Western Approaches in 1940–41 before beginning a year-long conversion into an escort destroyer. She helped to sink the German submarine U-136 in July 1942 before helping to liberate the island of La Réunion in November. The ship ran aground near Benghazi just a few weeks after being transferred to the Mediterranean in mid-1943. Salvage attempts failed and her wreck was abandoned after it broke in half.

In July 1940, Lynx and Tigre were present when the British attacked the French ships at Mers-el-Kébir, but managed to escape without damage. After they reaching Toulon, the sisters were placed in reserve, together with Panthère, as the oldest contre-torpilleurs in service and stripped of their light anti-aircraft armament. On 27 November 1942, Lynx was scuttled when the Germans attempted to capture the French ships at Toulon, but Panthère and Tigre were captured virtually intact. They were turned over to the Royal Italian Navy (Regia Marina) who renamed them FR 22 and FR 23, respectively, when they recommissioned them in early 1943. They were being used as transports when Italy surrendered in September; FR 22 (Panthère) was scuttled by the Italians, but FR 23 (Tigre) managed to escape and join the Allies.

Tigre resumed her former name and was given to the Free French the following month, but she needed extensive repairs that lasted until early 1944. The ship returned to convoy work for a few months before beginning a more extensive reconstruction that lasted until early 1945. She was then assigned to the Flank Force that protected Allied forces in the Tyrrhenian Sea from German forces in Northern Italy for the rest of the war. Several weeks after the end of the war in May, the ship supported French forces in Algeria during the riots in May–June. Tigre was then assigned as a fast troop transport until the end of 1946. She became a gunnery training ship until mid-1948 and was then hulked for the Engineering School. The ship was stricken from the Navy List in 1954 and broken up the following year.
