= French destroyer Jaguar =

French Chacal-class destroyer

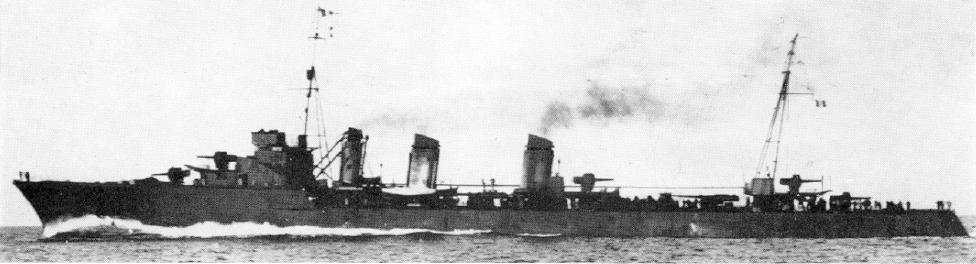
- Sister ship Chacal

History

France
- Name: Jaguar
- Namesake: Jaguar
- Ordered: 18 April 1922
- Builder: Arsenal de Lorient
- Way number: No. 7
- Laid down: 24 August 1922
- Launched: 17 November 1923
- Completed: 7 Oct 1926
- In service: 19 November 1926
- Fate: Torpedoed and wrecked, 23 May 1940

General characteristics (as built)
- Class & type: Chacal-class destroyer
- Displacement: 2,126 t (2,092 long tons) (standard); 2,980–3,075 t (2,933–3,026 long tons) (full load)
- Length: 126.8 m (416 ft 0.1 in)
- Beam: 11.1 m (36 ft 5.0 in)
- Draft: 4.1 m (13 ft 5.4 in)
- Installed power: 50,000 PS (37,000 kW; 49,000 shp); 5 du Temple boilers
- Propulsion: 2 shafts; 2 geared steam turbines
- Speed: 35.5 knots (65.7 km/h; 40.9 mph)
- Range: 3,000 nmi (5,600 km; 3,500 mi) at 15 knots (28 km/h; 17 mph)
- Crew: 12 officers, 209 crewmen (wartime)
- Armament: 5 × single 130 mm (5.1 in) guns; 2 × single 75 mm (3.0 in) anti-aircraft guns; 2 × triple 550 mm (21.7 in) torpedo tubes; 2 chutes; four throwers for 32 depth charges

The French destroyer Jaguar was a Chacal-class destroyer (contre-torpilleur) built for the French Navy during the 1920s. She spent most of her pre-World War II career as a flagship for various destroyer units. The ship was assigned convoy escort duties in the Atlantic after the start of the World War II in September 1939 until she was badly damaged during a collision in January 1940. Five months later, after her repairs were completed, she was committed to the English Channel after the Battle of France began in May 1940. Jaguar was torpedoed by German E-boats on 23 May and had to beach herself; her wreck was written off as unrepairable.

== Design and description ==
The Chacal-class ships were designed to counter the large Italian Leone-class destroyers. They had an overall length of 126.8 meters (416 ft 0 in), a beam of 11.1 meters (36 ft 5 in), and a draft of 4.1 meters (13 ft 5 in). The ships displaced 2,126 metric tons (2,092 long tons) at standard and 2,980–3,075 metric tons (2,933–3,026 long tons) at deep load. They were powered by two geared steam turbines, each driving one propeller shaft, using steam provided by five du Temple boilers. The turbines were designed to produce 50,000 metric horsepower (37,000 kW; 49,000 shp), which would propel the ship at 35.5 knots (65.7 km/h; 40.9 mph). During her sea trials on 18 May 1926, Jaguar's turbines provided 57,850 metric horsepower (42,550 kW; 57,060 shp) and she reached 35.27 knots (65.32 km/h; 40.59 mph) for a single hour. The ships carried 530 metric tons (522 long tons) of fuel oil which gave them a range of 3,000 nautical miles (5,600 km; 3,500 mi) at 15 knots (28 km/h; 17 mph). Their crew consisted of 10 officers and 187 crewmen in peacetime and 12 officers and 209 enlisted men in wartime. Jaguar was unique among the Chacals in being fitted to serve as a flagship and equipped to accommodate the admiral and his staff of four officers.

The main armament of the Chacal-class ships consisted of five Canon de 130 mm Modèle 1919 guns in single mounts, one superfiring pair fore and aft of the superstructure and the fifth gun abaft the aft funnel. The guns were numbered '1' to '5' from front to rear. Their anti-aircraft armament consisted of two Canon de 75 mm modèle 1924 guns in single mounts positioned amidships. The ships carried two above-water triple sets of 550-millimeter (21.7 in) torpedo tubes. A pair of depth charge chutes were built into their stern; these housed a total of twenty 200-kilogram (440 lb) depth charges. They were also fitted with four depth-charge throwers for which they carried a dozen 100-kilogram (220 lb) depth charges.

== Construction and career ==
Jaguar, named after the eponymous feline, was ordered on 18 April 1922 from the Arsenal de Lorient. She was laid down on 24 August 1922 on No. 7 slipway, launched on 17 November 1923, completed on 7 October 1926 and entered service on 19 November. Completion was delayed by problems with her propulsion machinery and late deliveries by sub-contractors. Even before she was formally completed, she participated in a Baltic cruise in mid-1926 and visited Dakar, French West Africa in December. She made another port visit in April 1927 at Seville, Spain. The following month she was one of the ships that escorted Gaston Doumergue, President of France, across the English Channel during his state visit to Britain. Jaguar then accompanied the light cruiser Lamotte-Picquet as she visited Dakar and Buenos Aires, Argentina between June and September. The ship became the flagship of the Group of Torpedo Boat Flotillas (later redesignated as the 1st Torpedo Boat Flotilla) of the 1st Squadron (1ere Escadre), based at Toulon, on 1 May 1928. Two months later, she hosted Doumerge as he reviewed the fleet off Le Havre on 3 July.

Two years later, the ship participated in the naval review at Algiers on 10 May 1930 commemorating the centenary of the first French landing in Algeria on 13 June 1830. The four depth charge throwers were removed in 1932. About two years later, the 75-millimeter guns were replaced by four twin mounts for 13.2-millimeter (0.5 in) anti-aircraft machineguns. Jaguar became the flagship of the 2nd Torpedo Boat Flotilla of the 2nd Squadron (2e Escadre) at Brest on 5 July 1935. After completing their maneuvers, the combined Brest and Toulon squadrons, including Jaguar, were reviewed in the Baie de Douarnenez by the Naval Minister, François Piétri, on 27 June 1936. The following year, the ship participated in the fleet review by the new Navy Minister, Alphonse Gasnier-Duparc, off Brest on 27 May 1937. The ship was relieved as flagship on 26 September, but temporarily resumed her former role from 1 March to 22 June 1939 while Bison was under repair after a collision.

When the war started in September 1939, Jaguar belonged to the 2nd Large Destroyer Division (2e division de contre-torpilleur) (DCT) with her sisters Chacal and Léopard. Between October and December, the ship had two depth-charge throwers reinstalled, No. 3 gun removed, and her depth charge stowage reduced to a dozen 200 kg and eight 100 kg depth charges to improve her stability. She was assigned to the Western Command (Forces maritimes de l'Ouest) for convoy escort duties from October to January 1940 where she guarded convoys traveling between Gibraltar and Brest as well as Casablanca, French Morocco, and Le Verdon-sur-Mer. On the night of 16/17 January 1940, Jaguar was accidentally rammed by the British destroyer Keppel. The collision killed one crewman aboard the French ship and Keppel's bow penetrated all the way to Jaguar's midline. The ship was able to reach Brest on 19 January to begin repairs that lasted until early May. She had a British Type 123 ASDIC installed in March and was fitted with degaussing equipment the following month.

After the beginning of the Battle of France on 10 May, the 2nd DCT was transferred to the English Channel to support British forces there. On 23 May, entering Dunkirk harbor with a demolition team aboard, Jaguar was struck by a torpedo fired by either the E-boat S-21 or S-23. The detonation killed 13 men and wounded 23; the ship had to be beached at Malo-les-Bains lest she sink, and was written off.
