= Vernon Leese =

English cricketer

Personal information
- Full name: Vernon Francis Leese
- Born: 20 February 1870; Kensington, Middlesex, England
- Died: 3 August 1927 (aged 57); Alassio, Liguria, Italy
- Batting: Unknown
- Relatives: Joseph Leese (father); Neville Leese (brother); William Leese (brother); Ernest Leese (uncle)

Domestic team information
- Years: Team
- 1892–1897: Marylebone Cricket Club
- 1892: Cambridge University

Career statistics
Competition	First-class
Matches	7
Runs scored	171
Batting average	14.25
100s/50s	–/–
Top score	44
Catches/stumpings	7/–
- Source: Cricinfo, 21 April 2021

Vernon Francis Leese OBE JP (20 February 1870 – 3 August 1927) was an English first-class cricketer.

The son of the cricketer and politician Sir Joseph Leese, he was born at Kensington in February 1870. He was educated at Winchester College, where he played for the cricket eleven. From Winchester he went up to Trinity Hall, Cambridge. While studying at Cambridge, he made his debut in first-class cricket for the Marylebone Cricket Club (MCC) against Cambridge University Cricket Club at Fenner's in May 1892. He followed this up a few days later by appearing for Cambridge University against Yorkshire, in what was his only first-class appearance for the university. He later played first-class cricket for the MCC on five occasions between 1895 and 1897. His seven first-class matches yielded him 171 runs with a highest score of 44. As a cricketer, he was described by Wisden as "a good and free hitter, could bowl slows, and fielded well, though in no particular place".

After graduating from Cambridge, Leese trained as a land agent on Mark Rolle's Devon estates. He gained employment as the resident agent at Erlestoke Park, holding the post between 1897 and 1899. He then served as private secretary to the 4th Marquess Camden from 1899 to 1901, before working at the estate of Hugh F. Locke King as resident agent from 1901 to 1905. From there he worked as a land agent at Hursley Park from 1905 to 1907, before becoming deputy–surveyor for the Forest of Dean until 1914, during which time he was also a justice of the peace for Gloucestershire. After 1914 he was deputy-surveyor for the New Forest and the Forest of Bere, and was made an OBE in the 1918 Birthday Honours. Leese died in Italy at Alassio in August 1927. From a cricketing family, his brothers Neville and William both played first-class cricket, as did his uncle Ernest Leese. His nephew was Oliver Leese, who commanded the Eighth Army and 11th Army Group in the final years of the Second World War.
