= Neville Leese =

English cricketer, miner and British Army officer

Personal information
- Full name: Neville Leese
- Born: 23 March 1872; Preston, Lancashire, England
- Died: 22 June 1948 (aged 76); Zeals, Wiltshire, England
- Batting: Unknown
- Relatives: Joseph Leese (father); Vernon Leese (brother); William Leese (brother); Ernest Leese (uncle)

Domestic team information
- Years: Team
- 1895: Marylebone Cricket Club

Career statistics
Competition	First-class
Matches	6
Runs scored	226
Batting average	18.83
100s/50s	–/1
Top score	59
Catches/stumpings	3/–
- Source: Cricinfo, 21 April 2021

Neville Leese OBE DSO (23 March 1872 – 22 June 1948) was an English first-class cricketer, miner and British Army officer.

The son of the cricketer and politician Joseph Leese, he was born at Preston in March 1872. He was educated at Winchester College, He later played first-class cricket for the Marylebone Cricket Club in May and June 1895, making six appearances. His six matches yielded him 226 runs with a highest score of 59, which came against Derbyshire. He left for New Zealand in the same year to work as a miner, before travelling to British Columbia, where he was awarded the Royal Humane Society medal for saving life. Leese served in the Second Boer War as a sergeant with Lord Strathcona's Horse, gaining the Queen's South Africa Medal and clasp. After the war he left Canada for Mexico, where he managed the Waterson gold mine in Ocampo.

By the beginning of the First World War, Leese had returned to England. Serving in the war, he was commissioned as a temporary lieutenant in the Royal Army Service Corps in September 1914, with temporary appointment to captain following in December 1914. Three months later in March 1915, he was temporarily appointed to the rank of major. Leese was awarded the Distinguished Service Order in the 1917 New Year Honours. He was appointed a temporary lieutenant colonel in June 1918. He relinquished the latter temporary rank following the war, but upon the completion of his service in October of the same year, he was granted the full rank of lieutenant colonel. He was made an OBE in the 1919 Birthday Honours for valuable services rendered in connection with military operations in Italy. Leese died in June 1948 at Zeals, Wiltshire, where he was also buried. From a cricketing family, his brothers Vernon and William both played first-class cricket, as did his uncle Ernest Leese. His nephew was Oliver Leese, who commanded the Eighth Army and 11th Army Group in the final years of the Second World War.
