= Sir William Leese, 2nd Baronet =

English cricketer and barrister

Personal information
- Full name: William Hargreaves Leese
- Born: 24 August 1868; Send, Surrey, England
- Died: 17 January 1937 (aged 68); Sidmouth, Devon, England
- Batting: Right-handed
- Relatives: Joseph Leese (father); Vernon Leese (brother); Neville Leese (brother); Ernest Leese (uncle); Oliver Leese (son)

Domestic team information
- Years: Team
- 1889–1890: Marylebone Cricket Club

Career statistics
Competition	First-class
Matches	2
Runs scored	57
Batting average	14.25
100s/50s	–/–
Top score	35
Catches/stumpings	3/–
- Source: Cricinfo, 21 April 2021

Sir William Hargreaves Leese, 2nd Baronet, JP (24 August 1868 – 17 January 1937) was an English barrister and first-class cricketer. Later in his career he was a solicitor with Freshfields.

== Life ==
The son of Sir Joseph Leese, he was born in August 1868 at Send, Surrey. He was educated at Winchester College, where he played for the cricket eleven.

From Winchester Leese went up to Trinity Hall, Cambridge, graduating B.A. in 1890. He was an enthusiastic amateur actor while at Cambridge, associated with the Footlights.

A student of the Inner Temple, Leese was called to the bar in 1893. He continued his interest in acting after leaving Cambridge. By 1905, Leese was a partner in the legal firm Freshfields & Co., who were solicitors for the Bank of England. He succeeded to the Leese baronetcy as the 2nd Baronet upon the death of his father in July 1914. He held the post of justice of the peace for Hertfordshire.

Sir William Leese died in January 1937 at Sidmouth. He was succeeded as the 3rd Baronet by his son, Sir Oliver Leese, who commanded the Eighth Army and 11th Army Group in the final years of the Second World War.

== Cricket ==
During his studies at Cambridge, Leese played first-class cricket for the Marylebone Cricket Club against Cambridge University at Fenner's in 1889, and Oxford University at Lord's in 1890. He scored 57 runs in these two matches, with a highest score of 35.

Leese's association with I Zingari led to him performing for the Old Stagers at the Canterbury Cricket Week; he was additionally associated with the Windsor Strollers.

Leese was from a cricketing family. His father and his brothers Vernon and Neville all played first-class cricket, as did his uncle Ernest Leese and his son Charles Leese.

== Family ==
Leese married on 12 December 1893 Violet Mary Sandeman, daughter of Albert George Sandeman of the Bank of England; the couple had three sons and a daughter, the eldest son Oliver Leese, a general of World War II, succeeding to the title.

Peerage of the United Kingdom
Preceded by Sir Joseph Leese	Baronet (of Sendholme); 1914–1937	Succeeded by Sir Oliver Leese
