= Battle of Boulogne =

Battle for the port and town of Boulogne-sur-Mer during 1940

Battle of Boulogne (1940)
- Part of Battle of France
- The Battle of France, situation 21 May – 4 June 1940
Date	22–25 May 1940
Location	Boulogne-sur-Mer, France 50°43′30″N 1°36′45″E
Result	German victory

Belligerents
France; United Kingdom; Belgium	Germany

Commanders and leaders
Pierre Louis Félix Lanquetot; William Fox-Pitt	Heinz Guderian; Rudolf Veiel; Wolfram Freiherr von Richthofen

Strength
(French Third Republic) Headquarters, garrison and training units; (United Kingdom) 2 infantry battalions; 1,500 Auxiliary Military Pioneer Corps troops; supporting units; (Belgium) training units	1 panzer division

Casualties and losses
c. 5,000 POW	
- Boulogne-sur-Mer in Northern France, a sub-prefecture of the department of Pas-de-Calais

The Battle of Boulogne in 1940 was the defence of the port of Boulogne-sur-Mer by French, British and Belgian troops in the Battle of France during the Second World War. The battle was fought at the same time as the Siege of Calais, just before Operation Dynamo, the evacuation of the British Expeditionary Force (BEF) from Dunkirk. After the Franco-British counter-attack at the Battle of Arras on 21 May, German units were held ready to resist a resumption of the attack on 22 May. General der Panzertruppe (Lieutenant-General) Heinz Guderian, the commander of XIX Corps, protested that he wanted to rush north up the Channel coast to capture Boulogne, Calais and Dunkirk. An attack by part of XIX Corps was not ordered until 12:40 p.m. on 22 May, by which time the Allied troops at Boulogne had been reinforced from England by most of the 20th Guards Brigade.

The Guards had time to dig in around the port before the 2nd Panzer Division, which had been delayed by French troops at Samer, attacked the perimeter held by the Irish Guards at around 5:00 p.m. and were driven off after an hour of fighting. The Welsh Guards front was attacked at 8:00 p.m. and again at dusk, cutting off a party of the Irish at 10:00 p.m. At dawn on 23 May, the German attacks resumed, eventually pushing the defenders back into the town. About eighty light bombers of the Royal Air Force (RAF) flew sorties in support of the defenders of the port.

Royal Navy ships shot their way into and out of the harbour; French and British destroyers bombarded German positions as wounded and non-combatants were embarked and a navy demolition party landed. During a lull in the afternoon of 23 May, the Luftwaffe bombed the harbour, despite being intercepted by RAF fighters. At 6:30 p.m. the Guards Brigade was ordered to re-embark; the British destroyers ran the gauntlet of German tanks and artillery to dock. The French defenders above the lower town could not be contacted and only in the morning of 24 May did General Lanquetot realise that the British had gone.

The French and the remaining British troops held out until 25 May and then surrendered. Guderian wrote that the halt order and the retention of considerable forces to guard against Allied counter-attacks, forfeited an opportunity quickly to capture the Channel Ports and destroy the Allied forces in northern France and Belgium. An advance on Dunkirk began on 23 May but the next day was halted until 27 May. Dunkirk was not captured until 4 June; by then, most of the BEF and many French and Belgian troops had escaped.

== Background ==
=== Boulogne ===
Map of the Côte d'Opale

Boulogne-sur-Mer, Calais, Dunkirk and Dieppe are Channel Ports on the French side at the narrowest part of the English Channel. Boulogne is at the mouth of the fast-flowing River Liane, which meanders through a valley. The harbour is on a level area of ground on either side of the river and is well built-up with steep roads uphill to the old town (Haute Ville or the Citadel). The rolling hills make for hidden approaches to the port and offer commanding high ground to an attacker, particularly the Mont St. Lambert ridge. During the Phoney War (September 1939 – 10 May 1940), the British Expeditionary Force (BEF) had been supplied through ports further to the west, such as Le Havre and Cherbourg, but the Channel Ports came into use once mine barrages had been laid in the English Channel, in late 1939, to reduce the demand for ships and escorts. When leave for BEF troops began in December, Boulogne came into use for communication and for troop movements.

=== Battle of France ===
On 10 May 1940, the Germans began Fall Gelb (Case Yellow) the offensive against France, Belgium and the Netherlands. Within a few days, the Germans achieved a breakthrough against the centre of the French front near Sedan and drove westwards down the valley of the River Somme. As the BEF withdrew through Belgium into northern France, fewer supply troops were needed as the lines of communication shortened. The British began to withdraw surplus manpower through Boulogne and Calais and on 17 May, Lieutenant-General Douglas Brownrigg, the Adjutant-General of the BEF, moved the Rear General Headquarters (GHQ) from Arras to Boulogne, without informing his French liaison officers. (Note: Relations among Franco-British commanders had been good until the German breakthrough on the Meuse, after which the British staff officers became apprehensive that they might be cut off from the coast, began slighting the liaison officers and withheld information. The French liaison party left Boulogne after a Luftwaffe air raid on the night of 19/20 May and reached Abbeville just before the Germans.) The Germans captured Abbeville at the mouth of the Somme on 21 May, cutting off the Allied troops in Northern France and Belgium from their bases further south.

The defence of Boulogne was the responsibility of the French Navy (Marine Nationale), which had a garrison of 1,100 men in the 19th-century forts of the port, commanded by Capitaine de Vaisseau Dutfoy de Mont de Benque. Eight British 3.7-inch anti-aircraft guns of the 2nd Heavy Anti-Aircraft Regiment, eight machine-guns of the 58th Light Anti-Aircraft Regiment and a battery of the 2nd Searchlight Regiment had arrived from England on 20 May; the French had two 75 mm field guns, two 25 mm anti-tank guns and two tanks, one of which was unserviceable. On 20 May, the foremost elements of the German XIX Corps (General der Panzertruppe Heinz Guderian), reached Abbeville. The Channel Ports became the only means of supply and if necessary, evacuation, for the Allies. In the early hours of 21 May, Dutfoy ordered the naval garrison of 1,100 men to retire behind the thick medieval walls of the Haute Ville (Old Town or Citadel), east of the River Liane.

Dutfoy heard alarmist reports of the approach of a large German force, apparently from General Jean Pelissier de Féligonde, commander of the 137th Infantry Regiment, which had been attacked by German tanks at Hesdin, 30 mi (48 km) to the south-east of the port. Dutfoy ordered his men to disable the coastal artillery in the forts and to head for the harbour for evacuation; the orders were amplified by other officers. Dutfoy left for Dunkirk in the early hours and discipline broke down, a naval store was broken into and the looters drank the contents. (Note: Dutfoy was court-martialled on 26 May.) Civilians still waiting for places on evacuation ships began to panic, until Capitaine de frégatte Poher, in charge of the sea front, threatened the crowd with a gun. Poher decamped at 10:00 a.m. and the spiking of the naval guns continued. Some of Dutfoy's men contacted Vice-Admiral Marcel Leclerc, the deputy commander of Dunkirk, who ordered the remaining guns to be preserved for the defence of the town. On a visit to Boulogne early on 22 May, Leclerc ordered the sailors to fight it out and wait for relief by the French and British armies. Admiral Jean Abrial the French commander at Dunkirk issued an order, "You are to die at your posts one by one rather than give in..."

== Prelude ==
=== Allied defensive preparations ===
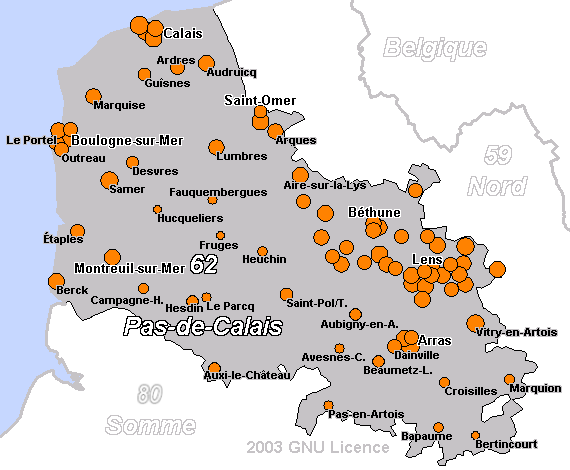
Canton map showing Saner and Desvres to the south-east of Boulogne

A detachment of Royal Marines arrived in Boulogne in the early morning of 21 May. The 20th Guards Brigade (Brigadier William Fox-Pitt), consisting of the 2nd Battalion, Welsh Guards and 2nd Battalion, Irish Guards, was training at Camberley on 21 May, when ordered to embark for France. With the brigade anti-tank company and a battery of the 69th Anti-Tank Regiment, Royal Artillery, the Guards arrived in Boulogne on the morning of 22 May on three merchant ships and the destroyer HMS Vimy, escorted by the destroyers Whitshed and Vimiera. The French 21st Infantry Division (Général de brigade [Brigadier-General] Pierre Louis Félix Lanquetot) was to hold a line between Samer and Desvres, about 10 mi (16 km) south of the town, where three battalions had already arrived. Further British reinforcements, including a regiment of cruiser tanks, were expected from Calais on the following day.

Fox-Pitt deployed his men on the high ground outside the town, liaising with Lanquetot who organised the French troops in the town. The Irish Guards held the right flank to the south-west from the river at St. Léonard to the sea at Le Portel and the Welsh Guards the left flank north-east of the river on the west slopes of Mont Lambert ridge and high ground through St. Martin Boulogne, which made a defensive perimeter of 6 mi (9.7 km). Road blocks had been established by a party of about fifty men of the 7th Royal West Kents from Albert, about 100 men of the 262nd Field Company Royal Engineers and anti-aircraft crew held the right flank of the Welsh Guards, along the roads approaching from the south. Fox-Pitt had left a gap in the perimeter between the Welsh left flank and the coast for the reinforcements expected from Calais. There were 1,500 men of No 5 Group Auxiliary Military Pioneer Corps (AMPC), a mixture of recalled reservists and part-trained troops working as labourers, in the town awaiting evacuation, under Lieutenant Colonel Donald Dean VC. Under French command were the fort garrisons and some French and Belgian training units of limited military value. Lanquetot had told Fox-Pitt that the French forces in Boulogne were "folded up" which Fox-Pitt inferred meant that they were ready to give up.

=== German preparations ===
The Franco-British counter-attack at Arras led the Germans to continue to attack north towards the Channel Ports, rather than south over the Somme and late on 21 May, Oberkommando des Heeres (OKH) ordered Panzergruppe Kleist to advance about 50 mi (80 km) north, to capture Boulogne and Calais. Apprehension about another counter-attack led to the XV Corps being held back, a division of the XLI Corps being moved eastwards and the 10th Panzer Division of XIX Corps was detached to guard against a counter-attack from the south. Parts of the 1st Panzer Division (Lieutenant-General Friedrich Kirchner) and 2nd Panzer Division (Lieutenant-General Rudolf Veiel), both formations of XIX Corps, were also held back to defend bridgeheads over the Somme. The 2nd Panzer Division was ordered to advance to Boulogne on a line from Baincthun to Samer, with the 1st Panzer Division as a flank guard on the right, advancing to Desvres and Marquise in case of a counter-attack from Calais.

== Battle ==
=== 22 May ===
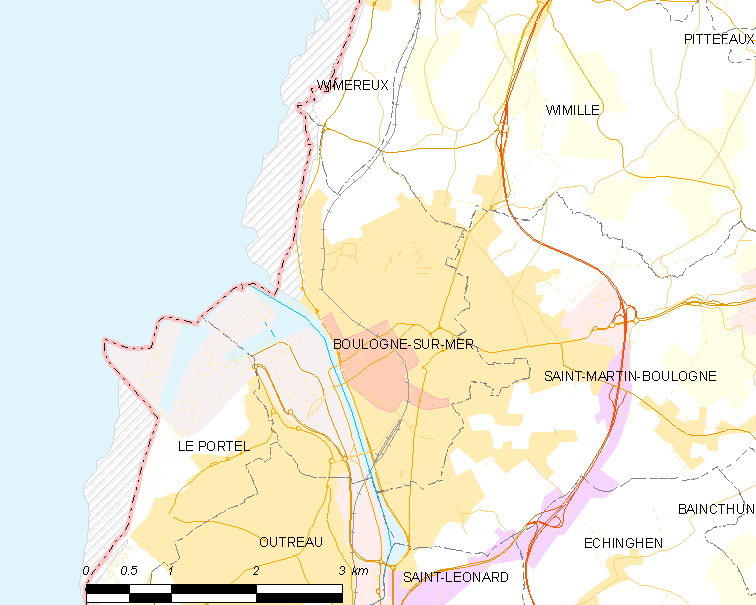
Modern map of Boulogne and vicinity (commune FR insee code 62160)

The 2nd Panzer Division formed two columns, one to circle round the town and attack from the north. The southern column made contact first in the early afternoon of 22 May, against the headquarters company of the French 48th Infantry Regiment, the only troops of the 21st Division who were between the Germans and Boulogne. The French clerks, drivers and signallers set up two 75 mm field guns and two 25 mm anti-tank guns to cover the cross-roads at Nesles, where they delayed the Germans for almost two hours, until they were outflanked. The column arrived at the outskirts of Boulogne in the evening and began shelling and probing the Irish Guards positions south of the town. The Irish knocked out the leading German tank and repulsed later attacks despite the Germans overrunning one of their forward platoons.

In the early hours, the Germans attacked the Welsh Guards positions along the coast from the north-east as they began to envelop the town but were forced back each time. Brownrigg, with Fox-Pitt's only communication link with England, departed with his staff at 3:00 a.m. on the destroyer HMS Verity, without informing the Guards. Only a few troops of the 21st Infantry Division were able take up its blocking positions near Desvres before the German advance reached them. The French managed to delay the 1st Panzer Division here for much of 22 May before Fox-Pitt was told at 4:00 a.m. that the French had been forced back to Boulogne by German tanks. Most of the 21st Infantry Division, en route to Boulogne by train, was ambushed by German tanks and dispersed.

=== 23 May ===
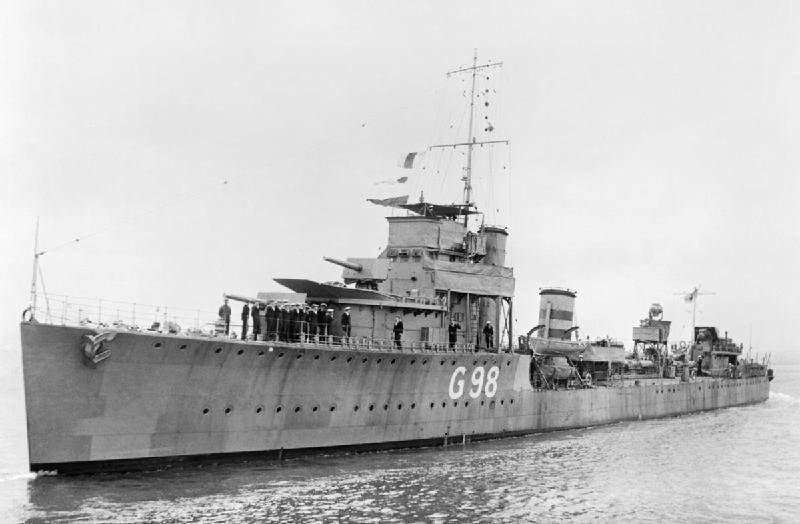
HMS Venomous, one of the First World War vintage British destroyers used in the evacuation

An hour after dawn, Fort de la Crèche near Wimereux, north of Boulogne, was captured by German troops. The possibility of reinforcement from Calais was thwarted by the appearance of German armour at the northern perimeter. Fox-Pitt realised that he would have to defend the port with only the two Guards battalions and the assorted French and British troops already there. The AMPC was hastily combed for men with military experience and armed with rifles taken from the others. The 800 men of the AMPC force were rushed into the gap between the two Guards battalions and another 150 were sent to reinforce the Welsh Guards. The anti-aircraft gunners guarding the southern roads destroyed two German tanks with their 3.7-inch anti-aircraft guns and then retired.

The Germans began a pincer attack on the positions of the Welsh and Irish Guards and by 10:00 a.m., the southern pincer, backed up by artillery and air support, had made the open slopes around the town untenable; the Guards were forced back into the town. Fliegerkorps VIII (Generalmajor Wolfram Freiherr von Richthofen) sent Stukas to destroy the fortifications at Boulogne which was of great help to the attacking forces. Vimy arrived at noon with a naval demolition party and Force Buttercup, a Royal Marine shore party, beginning the embarkation of casualties and the AMPC. Fox-Pitt received orders from Vimy to hold Boulogne at all costs, as his radio contact with England had been lost earlier in the day. The Royal Navy and a flotilla of French destroyers led by Capitaine Yves Urvoy de Portzamparc, comprising the large destroyers Chacal and Jaguar with the smaller destroyers Fougueux, Frondeur, Bourrasque, Orage, Foudroyant, Cyclone, Siroco and Mistral, gave fire support to the troops on the outskirts of the town.

The commander of the 2nd Panzer Division found that the British and French in Boulogne were "fighting tenaciously for every inch of ground" and could not tell if the British were evacuating or reinforcing the port. During a lull that afternoon, the destroyer HMS Keith berthed and began embarking AMPC troops. A Luftwaffe raid was intercepted by Royal Air Force (RAF) Spitfires from 92 Squadron but the commanders of both British destroyers were killed by bomb splinters. Frondeur was hit and disabled by Stuka dive bombers of I./Sturzkampfgeschwader 77, Orage was scuttled and the British destroyer Whitshed was damaged by a near-miss. Five pilots were lost by 92 Squadron; two were killed, two captured and one wounded, one aircraft being shot down by Messerschmitt Bf 109s, the other four by Messerschmitt Bf 110s. (Note: Squadron Leader Roger Bushell was among the prisoners.) By 3:00 p.m., Fox-Pitt had withdrawn the brigade to positions in the town and moved his headquarters nearer to the quay, the better to contact the destroyers, his only link with London. With German artillery having the advantage of observed fire to sweep the docks, he sent a message to London saying "situation grave".

Shortly before 6:00 p.m., Keith received orders for an immediate evacuation of the British and notification that five destroyers were either standing off Boulogne giving fire support or were en route. Fox-Pitt decided to continue with the AMPC evacuation while the Guards conducted a fighting withdrawal to the harbour but communication with the British troops on the perimeter was only possible by dispatch rider. The bridges held by the Guards were demolished by the Royal Engineers before the Irish Guards barricaded the streets with vehicles and withdrew to the harbour. The 800 pioneers commanded by Dean were the last to fall back from the perimeter, as Dean was away from his headquarters when the withdrawal orders arrived. Armed only with rifles, the pioneers had hoped to obstruct the Germans with makeshift roadblock barricades and claimed to have destroyed one tank by igniting petrol under it. Dean used his reserves to relieve two forward posts which had become isolated, resulting in fierce hand-to-hand fighting.

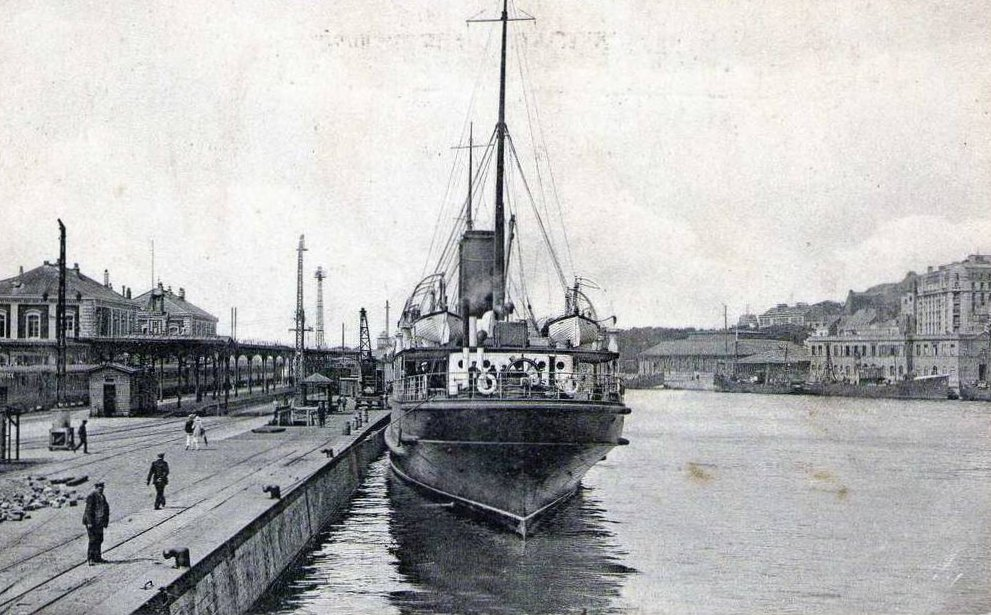
A pre-war photograph of the Gare Maritime at Boulogne, showing the quay used by British destroyers during the evacuation

Vimiera and Whitshed replaced Vimy and Keith, embarking many of the Marines and Guards. The harbour was full of ships but two gruppen (group, about 30 aircraft, similar to a RAF wing) of Stukas failed to hit the ships but bombs hitting the quayside near Vimy and Keith caused some casualties. The destroyers HMS Venomous and Wild Swan arrived and began embarking Force Buttercup and the remainder of the Irish Guards. With Germans in positions overlooking the harbour the Guards and the ships engaged in a duel with the German artillery. German tanks advancing towards the quayside were knocked out by the 4.7 inch guns of Venomous, one tank turning "over and over, like a child doing a cart-wheel". German field guns bombarded the harbour as the destroyer Venetia moved through the narrow entrance channel, and hit Venetia several times. Fires broke out on the ship but it was reversed out and made way for Venomous and Wild Swan which also departed in reverse, Venomous steering with its engines as the rudder had jammed.

=== 24–25 May ===
The destroyer HMS Windsor arrived after dark and was able to continue the embarkation. On clearing the harbour, the captain signalled that there were still British troops requiring evacuation and Vimiera was sent back, arriving in Boulogne at 1:30 a.m. The quayside was deserted but when the captain called out by loud hailer many men appeared from hiding; the crew managed to squeeze them aboard. When Vimiera arrived at Dover at 4:00 a.m., 1,400 men disembarked (including Arnold Ridley). Most of the British troops had gone but about 300 Welsh Guards remained. Lack of wireless sets left three of the Welsh Guards forward companies out of touch and by the time they had found out about the evacuation, two companies were cut off from the docks. The companies split into smaller groups and tried a break-out to the north-east. Lanquetot was based in the Haute Ville, awaiting the arrival of elements of the 21st Division. When he discovered the disaster that had befallen his division, he organised the defence of the town as best he could.

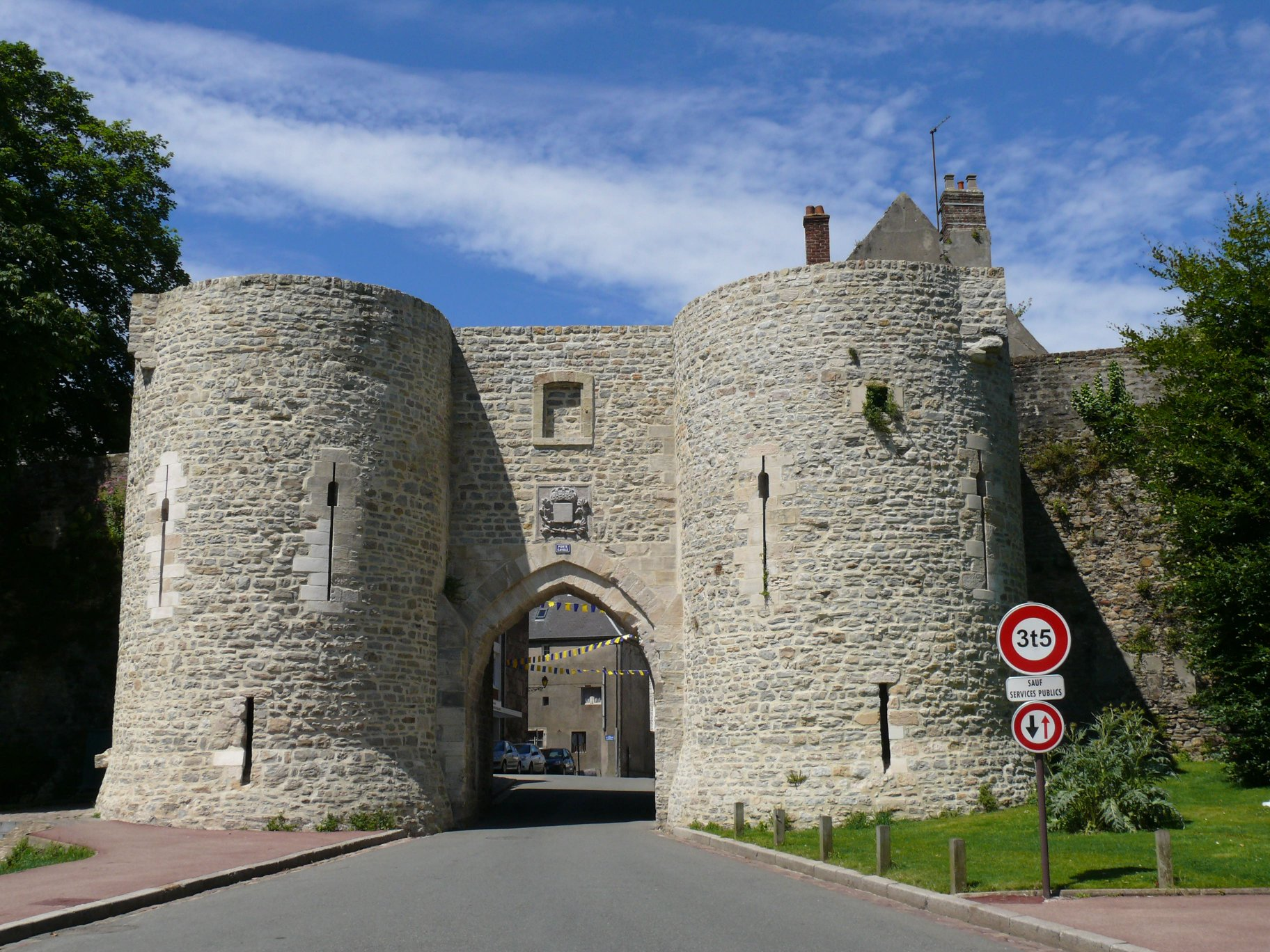
A gate in the medieval town walls, that was defended by parties of the 21st Infantry Division

German attacks on the town at 6:00 p.m. and 8:00 p.m. were repulsed and some German tanks were reported to have been destroyed. The French Navy continued its fire support but Fougueux and Chacal were damaged by the Luftwaffe; Chacal was sunk the next day by German artillery. During the night, about 100 French soldiers tried to break out towards Dunkirk but failed. At dawn on 25 May, the Germans attempted an escalade using grenades and flamethrowers, supported by 88 mm guns and at 8:30 a.m., Lanquetot surrendered. The German troops were supported by attacks from the Stukas of Sturzkampfgeschwader 2 (StG 2). The Stukas demolished the town and had their first encounter with RAF Fighter Command and lost four aircraft over Boulogne and Calais.

The last British unit in Boulogne was 3 Company, Welsh Guards (Major Windsor Lewis); 3 Company did not reach the docks until daybreak and Vimiera had left. Lewis took over a large party of stragglers in the sheds at the quayside comprising guardsmen, 120 French infantry, 200 AMPC, 120 Royal Engineers and 150 civilian refugees; most of the Pioneers were unarmed. When the sheds came under German fire, Lewis moved the group into the Gare Maritime (harbour railway station) and had sandbag barricades built. On the evening of 24 May, under fire from tanks and machine-guns, they repulsed a German party which approached the quay in a boat. Without food, short of ammunition and with no hope of evacuation, the force surrendered at 1:00 p.m. on 25 May. The Germans captured 5,000 Allied troops in Boulogne, the majority of whom were French. Many of the prisoners were put to work repairing the harbour fortifications to resist a British amphibious assault.

== Aftermath ==
=== Analysis ===
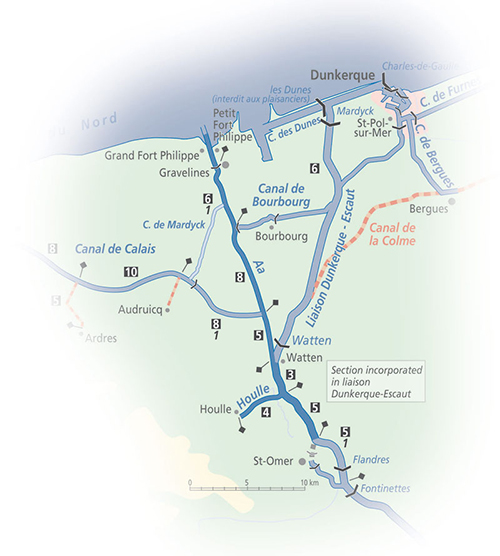
Aa and connecting waterways, to the west of Dunkirk

In the British Official History, Lionel Ellis wrote that the battle showed "how easily misunderstandings may arise between allies in such a confused situation". The 20th Guards Brigade had retired towards the outskirts of Boulogne on the morning of 23 May, after resisting attacks from all sides from 7:30 a.m. Lanquetot signalled that the British were withdrawing precipitately, perhaps unaware of how fiercely the withdrawal was being contested. Communication between Fox-Pitt and the French headquarters at the Citadel was cut by the German advance between the Citadel and the Guards positions in the lower town. Fox-Pitt received orders to evacuate British troops but not the French. On the morning of 24 May, when Lanquetot discovered that the British had gone there were French complaints about British "desertion". To the British, the Guards had been sent to Boulogne at short notice to hold a BEF trans-shipment port (entrepôt) and when it became redundant the two battalions, insufficient to hold the town, were withdrawn.

Allegations that the British had deserted the French may have influenced Churchill to order the garrison at Calais to fight to the finish during the siege. (Note: In Their Finest Hour (1949), Churchill wrote that he "regretted the evacuation" of Boulogne.) The decision was controversial as the British at Calais could have been evacuated after they had slowed the German advance towards Dunkirk. Ellis wrote that the five-hour delay of the XIX Corps attack on Boulogne on 22 May, ordered by Generaloberst (Colonel-General) Ewald von Kleist, had been criticised in the Corps war diary. Keeping the 10th Panzer Division in reserve during the attacks on Boulogne and Calais meant that the Aa Canal line, the western perimeter of the Dunkirk defences, could not be attacked simultaneously. Without the delay, the preparations of the 20th Guards Brigade in Boulogne might also have been interrupted. The long, exposed flank of Army Group A, the uncertain German hold on Amiens and Abbeville and Allied possession of Arras, meant that the advantageous situation enjoyed by the Germans on 22 May could have changed to the benefit of the Allies. The German delay was not excessive, since it was not known if the Allied counter-attack at Arras was over. In 1954 the naval historian, Stephen Roskill, wrote that the advance of the XIX Corps towards Dunkirk was delayed and the defence of Boulogne "undoubtedly contributed to that end" and assisted the Allies in the Battle of Dunkirk (26 May – 4 June). The Welsh and Irish Guards received the battle honour "Boulogne 1940".

== Orders of battle ==
=== XIX Corps ===
From the British official history The War in France and Flanders 1939–1940 (1954 [2004 ed.]) unless indicated.

- Panzergruppe Kleist (General of Cavalry Paul Ludwig Ewald von Kleist, Chief of Staff Brigadier-General Kurt Zeitzler)
  - XIX Corps (General of Cavalry Heinz Guderian)
    - 1st Panzer Division (Major-General Friedrich Kirchner)
    - 2nd Panzer Division (Major-General Rudolf Veiel)
    - 10th Panzer Division (Major-General Ferdinand Schaal)
  - XXXXI Corps (Major-General Georg-Hans Reinhardt)
    - 6th Panzer Division (Brigadier-General Werner Kempf)
    - 8th Panzer Division (Colonel Erich Brandenberger)

=== Boulogne garrison ===
Troops evacuated, 23–24 May 1940 (approx.)
Ship	Troops
Keith	180
Vimy	150
Whitshed	580
Vimiera	1,955
Wild Swan	400
Windsor	600
Venomous	500
Total	4,365

From the British official history The War in France and Flanders 1939–1940 (1954 [2004 ed.]) unless indicated.

- 21st Infantry Division (General Pierre Louis Félix Lanquetot)
  - Headquarters company, 48th Infantry Regiment
- French and Belgian training units
- 20th Guards Brigade Group (Brigadier William Fox-Pitt)
  - 2nd Battalion, Irish Guards
  - 2nd Battalion, Welsh Guards
  - 20th Guards Brigade Anti-Tank Company
  - 69th Anti-Tank Regiment, Royal Artillery (one battery)
- 1,500 men Auxiliary Military Pioneer Corps (untrained)
- Force Buttercup (Royal Marine demolition party)

== See also ==
- Boulogne Bowl, a commemorative silver trophy in recognition of the role of the Pioneer Corps in the 1940 Battle of Boulogne
- Operation Wellhit, the Canadian liberation of Boulogne in 1944
- List of British military equipment of World War II
- List of French military equipment of World War II
- List of Belgian military equipment of World War II
- List of German military equipment of World War II

== Bibliography ==
=== Books ===
- Baker, A. (1986). Battle Honours of the British and Commonwealth Armies. London: Ian Allan. ISBN 978-0-7110-1600-2.
- Bond, B.; Taylor, M. D., eds. (2001). The Battle for France & Flanders Sixty Years On (1st ed.). Barnsley: Leo Cooper. ISBN 978-0-85052-811-4.
- Churchill, W. S. (1949). Their Finest Hour. The Second World War. Vol. II. Boston, MA: Mariner Books. OCLC 396145.
- Cooper, M. (1978). The German Army 1933–1945, its Political and Military Failure. Briarcliff Manor, NY: Stein and Day. ISBN 978-0-8128-2468-1.
- Corum, James (2008). Wolfram von Richthofen: Master of the German Air War. Lawrence, KS: University of Kansas. ISBN 978-0-7006-1598-8.
- de Zeng, H. L.; Stankey, D. G.; Creek, E. J. (2009). Dive-Bomber and Ground-Attack Units of the Luftwaffe, 1933–1945: A Reference Source. Vol. I. London: Ian Allan. ISBN 978-1-906537-08-1.
- Dildy, Douglas (2015). Fall Gelb 1940 (2): Airborne Assault on the Low Countries. London: Osprey. ISBN 978-1-4728-0274-3.
- Ellis, Major L. F. (2004) [1954]. Butler, J. R. M. (ed.). The War in France and Flanders 1939–1940. History of the Second World War United Kingdom Military Series (pbk. repr. Naval & Military Press, Uckfield ed.). HMSO. ISBN 978-1-84574-056-6.
- Franks, Norman (1997). Royal Air Force Fighter Command Losses of the Second World War: Operational losses: Aircraft and crews, 1939–1941. Vol. I. Leicester: Midland. ISBN 978-1-85780-055-5.
- Gardner, W. J. R. (2000). The Evacuation from Dunkirk: Operation Dynamo, 26 May – 4 June 1940. London: Frank Cass. ISBN 978-0-7146-5120-0.
- Hawkins, I. (2003). Destroyer: An Anthology of First-Hand Accounts of the War at Sea 1939–1945. London: Conway Maritime Press. ISBN 978-0-85177-947-8.
- Jackson, R. (1974). Air War Over France, 1939–1940. London: Ian Allan. ISBN 978-0-7110-0510-5.
- Jackson, R. (2002). Dunkirk: The British Evacuation, 1940. London: Cassell Military Paperbacks. ISBN 978-0-304-35968-4.
- Rohwer, Jürgen; Hümmelchen, Gerhard (1992) [1972]. Chronology of the War at Sea, 1939–1945: The Naval History of World War Two (2nd rev. ed.). Annapolis, MD: Naval Institute Press. ISBN 978-1-55750-105-9.
- Roskill, S. W. (1954). The War at Sea. History of the Second World War. Vol. I. London: HMSO. OCLC 174453980.
- Sebag-Montefiore, H. (2006). Dunkirk: Fight to the Last Man. London: Penguin. ISBN 978-0-14-102437-0.
- Smith, Peter (2011). The Junkers Ju 87 Stuka: A Complete History. London: Crecy. ISBN 978-0-85979-156-4.
- Thompson, Julian (2009). Dunkirk: Retreat to Victory. London: Pan Books. ISBN 978-0-330-43796-7.

=== Encyclopaedias ===
- Rickard, J. (18 February 2008). "Battle of Boulogne, 22–25 May 1940". Military History Encyclopaedia on the Web.

=== Reports ===
- Windsor Lewis, J. C. (1940). Report of Operations, 21st – 24th May, 2nd Battalion Welsh Guards by Major J. C. Windsor Lewis. The National Archives Catalogue Reference (Report). CAB 106/228.
- Report on operations of 2nd. Battalion Irish Guards at Boulogne, 1940 May 21–23. The National Archives Catalogue Reference (Report). CAB 106/226.
