= Draven =

Draven may refer to:

- Jojo Draven, musician and composer
- Eric Draven, fictional hero of James O'Barr's comic book The Crow
- Draven (band), English rock band
- Draven, a playable character in the video game League of Legends
