= William Fox-Pitt (British Army officer) =

British Army officer (1896–1988)

Major-General William Fox-Pitt CVO DSO MC
- Born: 28 January 1896; London, England
- Died: 26 April 1988 (aged 92)
- Burial place: Caundle Marsh, England
- Education: Charterhouse School
- Relatives: William Fox-Pitt (grandson)
- Military career
- Allegiance: United Kingdom
- Branch: British Army
- Service years: 1914–1947
- Rank: Major-General
- Service number: 9184
- Commands: 203 British Sub-Area (1945–1947); 27th (N Rhodesia) Infantry Brigade (1944–1945); East Kent District (1943); 5th Guards Armoured Brigade (1941–1943); 20th Independent Infantry Brigade (Guards) (1940–1941); South London Sub-Area (1939–1940); Welsh Guards (1938–1939); 1st Battalion, Welsh Guards (1934–1937)
- Conflicts: First World War; Second World War
- Awards: Commander of the Royal Victorian Order; Distinguished Service Order; Military Cross; Mentioned in Despatches

Major-General William Augustus Fitzgerald Lane Fox-Pitt, CVO, DSO, MC (28 January 1896 – 26 April 1988) was a British Army officer who served in both the First World War and Second World War.

== Early life ==
Fox-Pitt was born in London on 28 January 1896, the son of Lieutenant Colonel W. A. Fox-Pitt, a soldier with the Grenadier Guards. For his education he attended Charterhouse School before following his father into the army, joining the Cheshire Regiment in August 1914.

== First World War and interwar career ==
Fox-Pitt sailed for France with the Cheshire Regiment in October 1914 before transferring to the newly formed Welsh Guards the following year. While with the regiment, he was wounded in the fighting at the Hohenzollern Redoubt. Commanding a company at Ginchy on the Somme in 1916, he won a Military Cross. The citation for the award stated:

For conspicuous gallantry during operations. When commanding the left company of a line holding a position, he succeeded in getting into touch with troops on his left and establishing connections all through. His company was not only heavily shelled, but was fighting continuously at close quarters for twenty-four hours, and inflicted heavy loss to the enemy.

— Edinburgh Gazette

Fox-Pitt was injured once more during 1918.

Remaining with the Welsh Guards after the war, Fox-Pitt commanded the regiment's 1st Battalion from 1934 to 1939, which was followed by command of the whole regiment.

== Second World War and retirement ==
During the Battle of France, Fox-Pitt was made an acting brigadier and given command of the 20th Guards Brigade. It sailed to France with two battalions, to defend Boulogne. During the Battle of Boulogne, the brigade held the town for two days before being evacuated. For his "leadership and personal example" during the battle, Fox-Pitt was awarded a Distinguished Service Order. He then commanded the 5th Guards Armoured Brigade. He was then given the acting rank of major general, and placed in command of the East Kent District in 1943. He reverted to his prior rank and was dispatched to Africa, where he commanded the 27th (N Rhodesia) Infantry Brigade.

From 1945 to 1947, Fox-Pitt was aide-de-camp to King George VI, granted the honorary rank of major general, and retired from the army.

== Later life ==
Fox-Pitt was a member of HM Bodyguard of the Honourable Corps of Gentlemen at Arms between 1947 and 1966 and was the Corps' Standard Bearer from 1961 to 1963. He was also appointed Deputy Lieutenant for Dorset in 1957.

An enthusiastic hunter, Fox-Pitt enjoyed shooting and fishing and was chair of the Blackmoor Vale hunt. He died at the age of 92 and his ashes were interred at Caundle Marsh, Dorset.

== Bibliography ==
- Joslen, H. F. (2003) [1960]. Orders of Battle: Second World War, 1939–1945. Uckfield, East Sussex: Naval and Military Press. ISBN 978-1-84342-474-1.
