= Charles Leese =

English cricketer

Charles Philip Leese (22 May 1889 – 19 January 1947) was an English cricketer active from 1908 to 1911 who played for Lancashire.

== Life ==
He was born in Manchester, the son of Ernest Leese, and died in Hope-Bagot, Shropshire.

He appeared in 16 first-class matches as a righthanded batsman, scoring 341 runs with a highest score of 48 and held five catches.

== Family ==
Leese married, firstly in 1911 Ethel Speakman, daughter of Walter Speakman, but they divorced. She later married architect Maxwell Fry, in 1926, that marriage lasting to 1942.

He married, secondly in 1914, after the death of his father, Beryl Constance Ansdell, daughter of Thomas Chester Ansdell and granddaughter of Richard Ansdell.
