= Pierre Louis Félix Lanquetot =

Pierre Louis Félix Lanquetot (French: [pjɛʁ lwi feliks lɑ̃kto]; 5 October 1880 in Sèvres – 26 May 1974 in Vaucresson) was a French Brigadier general.

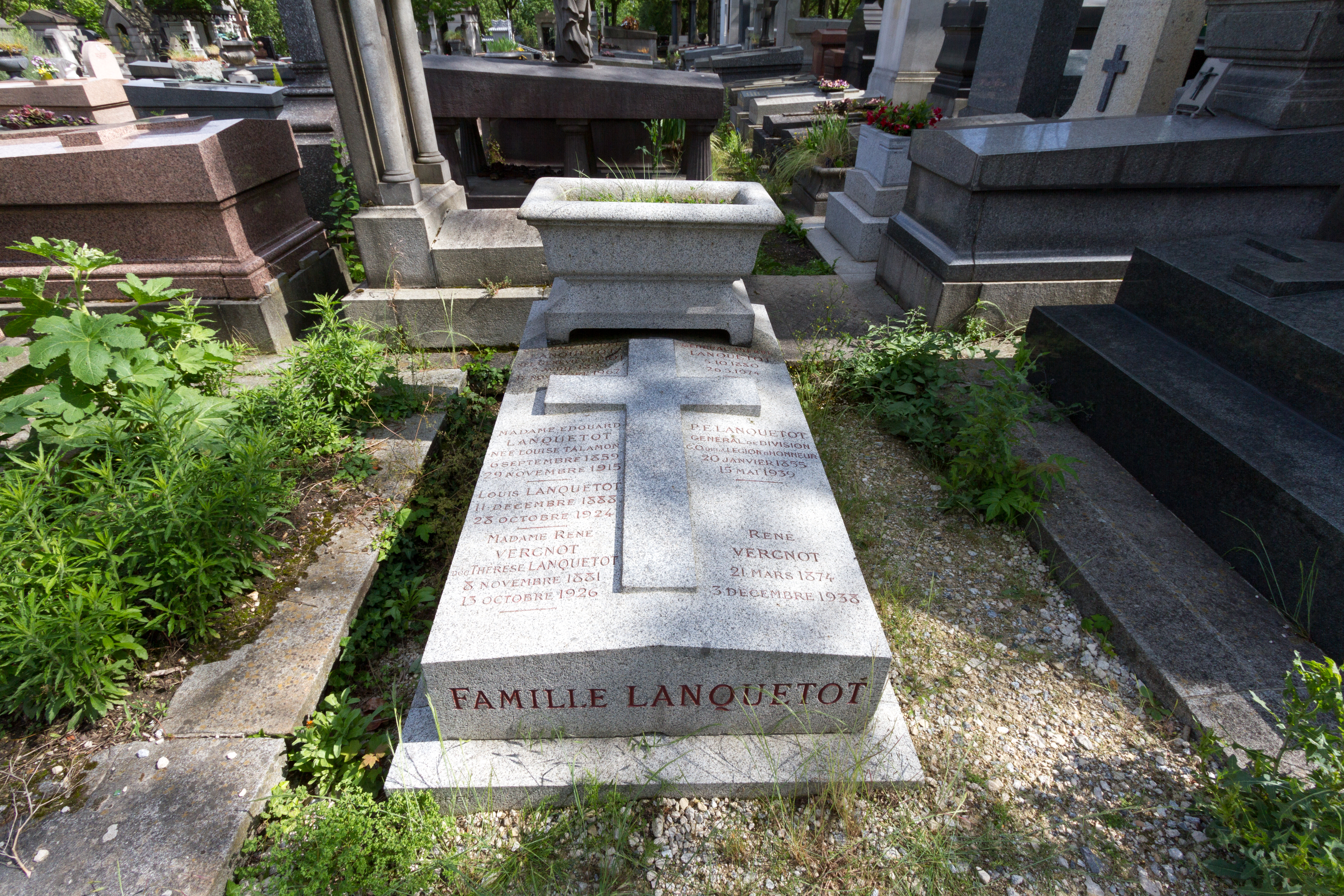
Grave at Père Lachaise Cemetery

In 1940, as defence commander of the sector of Boulogne, he was the commander in chief of the French troops during the Battle of Boulogne.

From 1940 to 1941 he was a prisoner of war. He died in Vaucresson at age 93.
