= Send, Surrey =

Village in Surrey, England

Coordinates: 51°17′16″N 0°31′35″W

Send
- Village
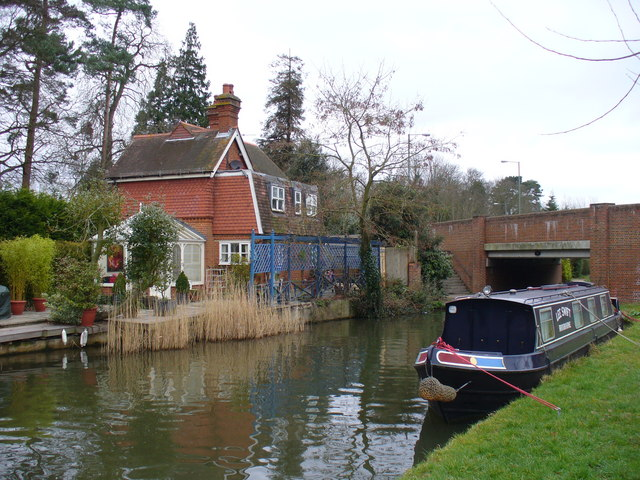
- Cartbridge over the River Wey, Send

- Location within Surrey
- Area: 6.95 km^{2} (2.68 sq mi)
- Population: 4,245 (Civil Parish 2011)
  - Density: 611/km^{2} (1,580/sq mi)
- OS grid reference: TQ028553
  - London: 23.3
- Civil parish: Send
- District: Guildford
- Shire county: Surrey
- Region: South East
- Country: England
- Sovereign state: United Kingdom
- Post town: Woking
- Postcode district: GU23
- Dialling code: 01483
- Police: Surrey
- Fire: Surrey
- Ambulance: South East Coast
- UK Parliament: Guildford

Send is a village and civil parish in the Guildford borough of the English county of Surrey. The name is thought to mean "sandy place" and sand was extracted at various periods until the 1990s at pits in the outskirts of the parish.

Send is buffered by Metropolitan Green Belt from other villages and towns except for the Grove Heath neighbourhood of Ripley. A rural band of the village adjoins the River Wey including Cartbridge and Send Marsh – this land has been drained and the river tamed by sluices, the Broadmead Cut and the Wey Navigation. The vast majority of the built-up areas are not within an area of flood risk. Between the river and the navigation, in the far north of the parish, are the Papercourt and Broad Mead SSSIs.

== History ==
The first record of Send is from a 1063 copy of a survey from c. 960, in which the settlement appears as Sendan. Throughout the middle ages, it is recorded as Sande, Saunde and Sonde. The name is thought to derive from the Old English ‑sænde indicating a sandy place.

Send appears in the Domesday Book of 1086 as Sande. It was held by Rainald (Reginald) from Alvred de Merleburgh (Marlborough). Its Domesday assets were: 20 hides; 1 church, 10 ploughs, 2 mills worth £1 3s 6d, 5 fisheries worth 4s 6d, 84 acres (34 ha) of meadow, woodland for 160 hogs. It rendered £15 10s 0d per year to its overlords. In this case the manorial lords were simply recorded as Herbert; Reginald son of Erchenbald; and Walter, seemingly Anglo-Saxon. It was held at the time of the Norman Conquest by Karli of Norton.

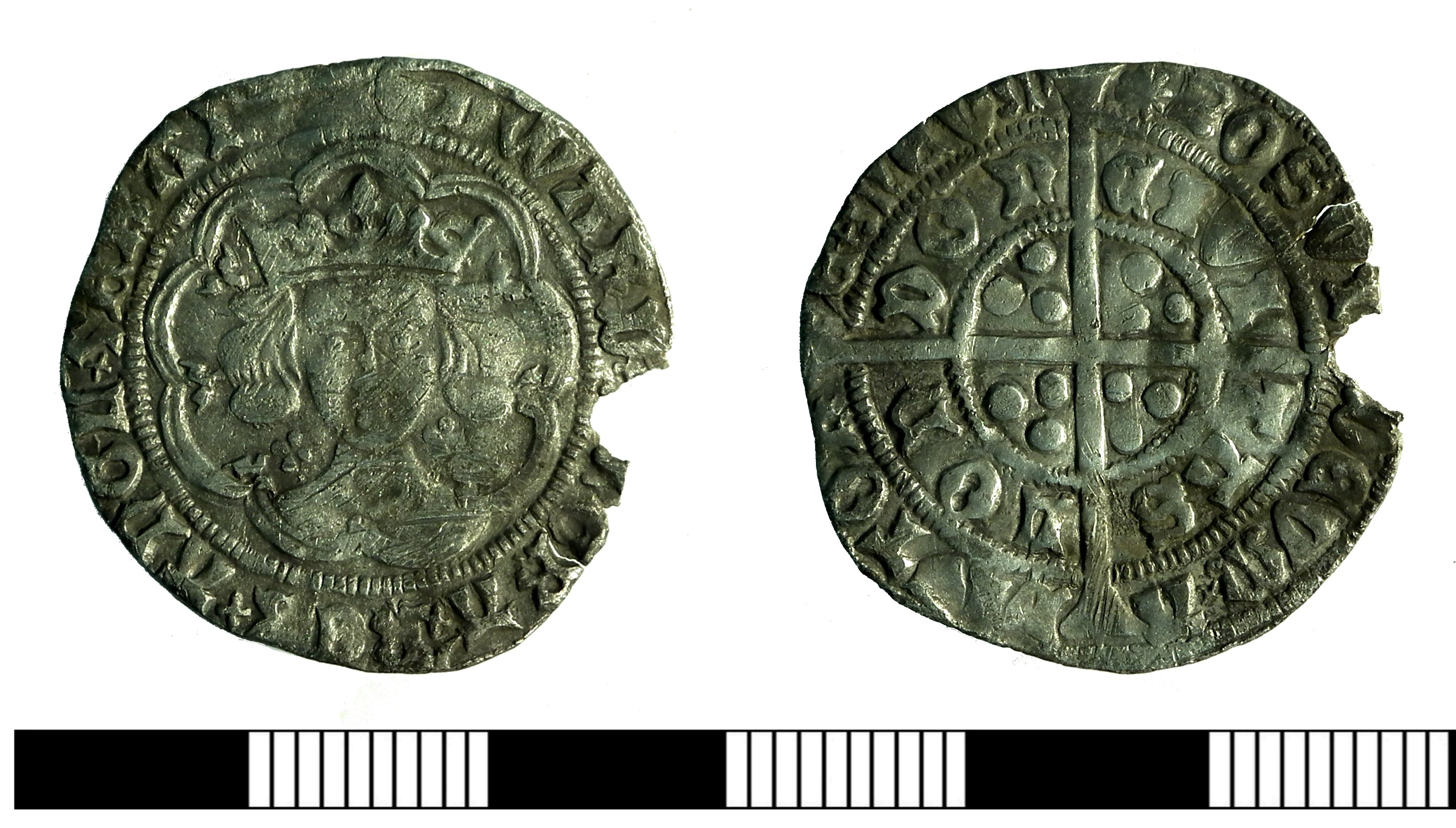
A silver groat from the first reign of Edward IV(1461–1470), found in Send

The parish saw a little-known skirmish. On 14 June 1497 the first Cornish Rebellion was launched against Henry VII; the rebels were marching from Cornwall to Kent unbeknown to the King, and after passing Guildford they had a skirmish with some of the outposted royal troops on the road from Guildford to London. The troops fell back or were outmanoeuvred, for they had lost the rebels on the 16th and were looking for them on the Portsmouth Road again near Kingston when they were actually on the border of Kent. Old maps mark the place where the road crosses the stream which joins the Wey near Send as St. Thomas's Waterings.

Ripley was, at the time of the Domesday Book, a hamlet of Send. In 1878 Ripley gained its own parish. The earliest official record, such as a Patent Roll, revealing its manor's existence is in 1279. Growth in ambition of the local nobility coupled with a large enough population led to the first place of worship being built at Ripley, to become a chapelry to St Mary the Virgin, around the year 1160.

Brickfields were developed in the south of Send by the 1870s, and continued to be worked until at least 1911.

The Leese baronets "of Sendholme in Send in the County of Surrey", who lived at the large house of that name in the village, bore a title created in 1908 for Joseph Leese, Liberal Member of Parliament for Accrington from 1892 to 1910. The third Baronet was a Lieutenant-General in the Coldstream Guards and served as Commander-in-Chief of the Allied Land Forces in South-East Asia from 1944 to 1945 and as General Officer Commanding-in-Chief of the Eastern Command from 1945 to 1946.

Send was the base of the defunct 1950s Formula One and sports car constructor Connaught Engineering.

== Geography and transport ==
Send is a lightly dispersed village centred 23 miles (37 km) south-west from Charing Cross and 6 miles (9.7 km) south-west of junction 10 of the M25 and has a developed clustered centre on the old course of the Portsmouth Road which bisects the highest settled part of the village, Burntcommon, which is on the start of rise of the London Clay. This road was relieved by the construction of a six-lane bypass, part of the A3 trunk road, which now forms the long south-east border of the village. The other principal road is the A247 Woking to West Clandon road which passes through the village from north to south.

The parish is bounded to the west and part of its northern side by the River Wey, which is controlled by sluices and has been expanded in capacity by a navigable channel running alongside, the Wey Navigation.

The nearest railway stations are at West Clandon, on the New Guildford Line, and Woking, on the South West Main Line, which offer frequent fast and semi-fast services to London.

White Bus Services operate irregular routes 462 and 463 through Send village between Woking and Guildford, while Falcon Buses runs the hourly route 715 through Burntcommon between Kingston upon Thames and Guildford.

=== Soil ===
Send is on a gently rising patch of Bagshot Sand, with Cartbridge, like Ripley, on sand and gravel of the lower Wey Valley; a southern part of the parish is on generally higher still London Clay.

=== Elevation ===
Elevations range from 49 m (161 ft) Above Ordnance Datum in the south to 22 m (72 ft) at the far northern border on the Wey Navigation.

== Localities ==
=== Cartbridge ===
Cartbridge is a mostly amorphous locality that covers the western end of the village's main street, particularly where it turns to the north towards Woking.

=== Send Marsh ===
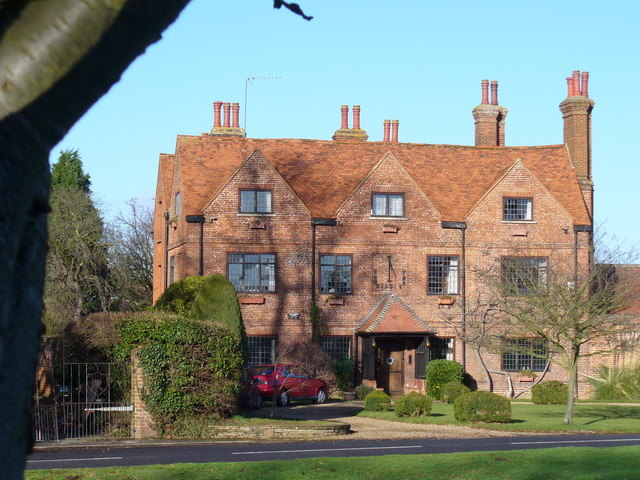
Send Marsh, Manor House

The neighbourhood is contiguous with the clustered, built-up estates of Boughton Court Avenue and the Portsmouth Road forming Burntcommon. For census analyses of the largest neighbourhoods in Surrey, in 2001 the county council opted to consider Burntcommon as a non-notable locality jointly with Send Marsh. On this basis its population at the 2001 United Kingdom census was almost half of the village as a whole, at 1,937.

Send Marsh has Send's Grade II listed late 17th century manor house by the village green. It is built of brown brick in English bond. The hamlet has one public house, called the Saddlers Arms, but no shops or church.

Unusually for Guildford schools it is within the admission priority area of Guildford's George Abbot School most years and the boundaries have not to date excluded it to be replaced by for instance closer areas of north-western Guildford.

=== Burntcommon ===
Burntcommon is a locality of Send that directly adjoins Send Marsh. Its nearest town is Woking, which lies approximately 3.1 miles (5.0 km) north-west.

== Amenities ==
=== Health and well-being ===
The small Send Surgery on Send Road next to the Church Rooms closed in 2003 and reopened on Send Barns Lane as the modern Villages Medical Centre serving 7,000 people in Send, Ripley and the surrounding villages. The old surgery is now occupied by a beauty treatment business. The Old Hall, on Send Marsh Road, is now a residential care home.

=== Businesses ===
The main route through the community runs NE/SW, the A247 Send Road, along which are scattered the shops, businesses and facilities.

These include the grocery store/post office, 2 takeaways, a barbers, a charity shop, a cafe, a fireplace outlet, an independent funerals firm, a hairdressers, a microscope and measuring devices manufacturer, Ghost Production Studios, based at the Old Riding Stables on Send Hill, have worked with several well-known clients, including Paul Connelly, Ben Lovejoy, Sue Macmillan, Social, Satellite State, Go West, Tony Hadley, Heat Wave, Charlie Morgan, Mark Brizickey, Adam Wakeman, Victoria Beckham, Elton John, and Draven.

=== Recreation ===
Send has a recreation ground, the Lancaster Hall and the Church Rooms. There are two pubs in the village: The New Inn in Cartbridge, adjacent to the Wey Navigation and The Saddlers Arms in Send Marsh.

=== Schools ===
Send National School, off Send Hill, was built in 1834 and enlarged in 1892. When the school closed, the building was converted to residential use. It is now known as The Old School.

Send Church of England Central School was built in 1939 but, with war imminent, its opening was delayed until 1941 in case the building was required for military use. During the planning process questions were raised in the House of Commons about the provision of adequate drainage. Initially conceived as a secondary school, it was built on a large plot of land with space for facilities including a light engineering workshop, a carpentry room, a domestic science room and a gymnasium, in addition to a vast playing field. Over time it became known as St Bede's and, from 1972, was relaunched as a middle school. Facilities grew to include two outdoor swimming pools.

Send Church of England (Foundation) First School was built in 1958.

Send's two schools formed the Federation of Send Church of England Schools on 29 March 2012.

Under its final title, St Bede's Church of England (Aided) Junior School buildings were demolished in Summer 2017 and a replacement building for 7– to 11-year-olds was erected on the Send First School site on Send Barns Lane.

=== Religion ===
==== Church of England ====
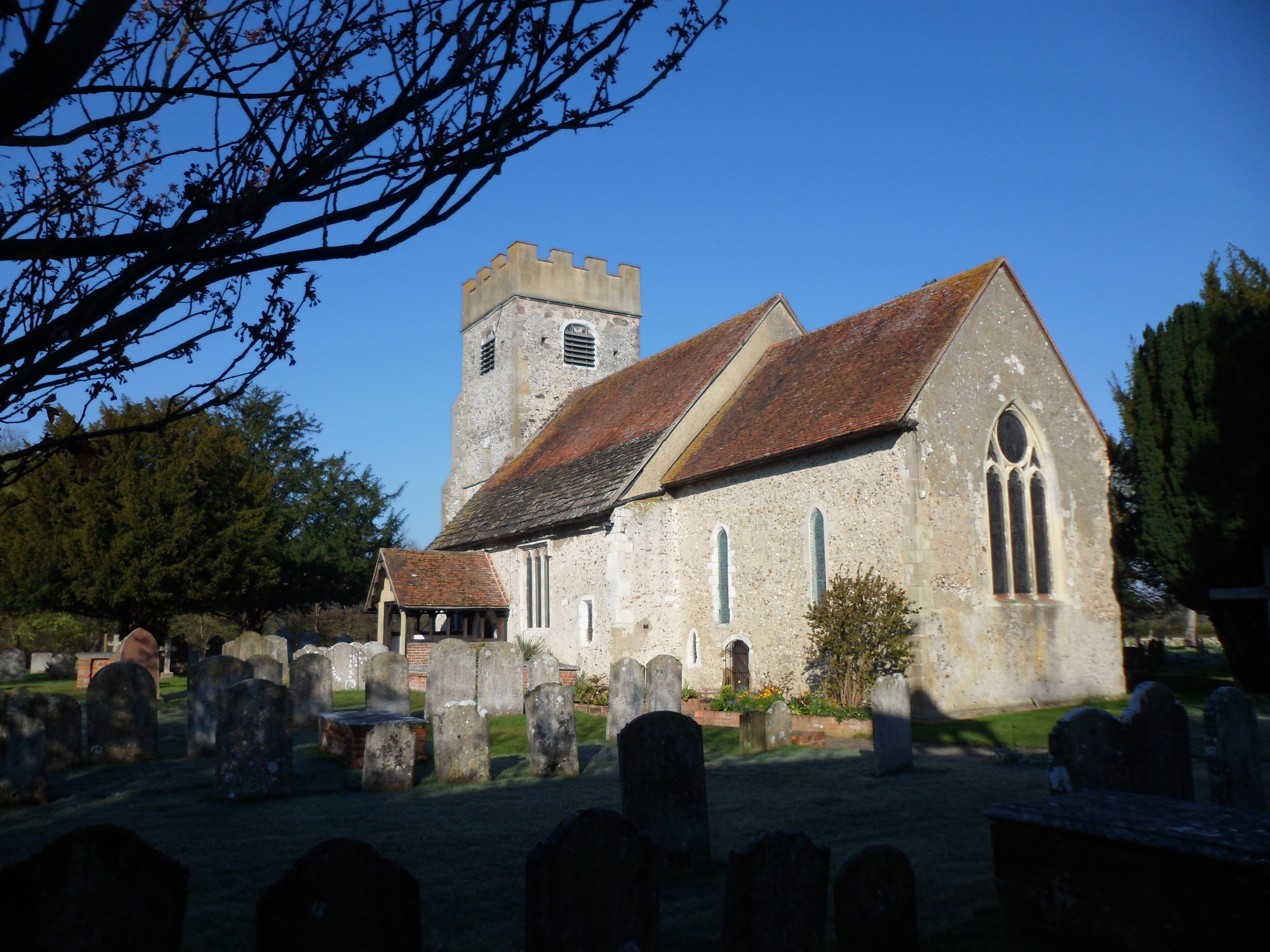
Parish Church of St Mary the Virgin, Send

Send parish church is dedicated to St Mary the Virgin and dates from around 1220. The nave was rebuilt and the tower added in around 1485. New kitchen and toilet facilities were completed in 2002. A York stone path was laid in the churchyard in 2003. The church is a Grade II* listed building and is the oldest building still in use in Send. In January 2008 the church was voted Visitor/Leisure Attraction of the Year in the Guildford Life with Style awards, attracting 75% of the votes and beating the Royal Horticultural Society gardens at Wisley, Watts Gallery, Guildford Tour Guides and Surrey Hills Llamas. In October 2008 the church received the Mayor of Guildford's Award for Access.

==== Roman Catholicism ====
St William of York (RC) church closed in 2007.

==== Evangelical ====
Send Evangelical Church opened in May 1974 using the former Congregational chapel in Cartbridge, built in 1875.

=== War memorials ===
Send has three such memorials.

A Celtic-style stone cross next to the Church Rooms on Send Road rises above these inscriptions: "1914–1918 in memory of the men of this village who at the call of duty gave their lives their country. Faithful unto death." The names of the fallen are:

- (1914–1918) G. Frederick Barnes, William Barnett, Arthur Brackley, William C. Collins, George F. Craddock, Trevor Durrant, Robert G. Fuller, Albert Giles, William Giles, Alan F. M. Grant, David Millard, Archibald Muir, Maurice Simmonds, W. Kenneth Sinclair, Robin R. Skene, Ernest Tickner, Jack Tickner, Herbert W. Walls, Ernest A. Whapshot, Sidney Wright, Alfred Wye.
- (1939–1945) Robert P. Dixon, Bradford W. O. Dockerty, Robin Giles, Rupert P. James, Frank Hack, Hubert E. Murrell, Ian Matheson, Brian T. Opperman, Donald W. S. Price, William Smith, Edward P. Winton, Edward Wood, Leslie Woolley, William Pratt.

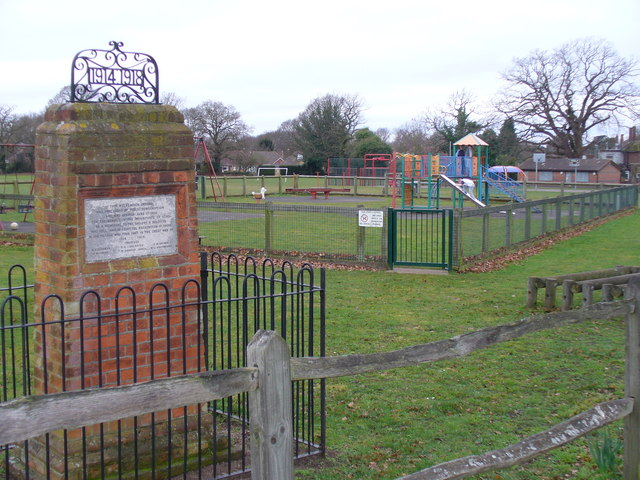
Recreation ground memorial

A brick memorial mounted with a wrought iron "1914 1918" in the recreation ground near the corner of Send Road and Sandy Lane bears the words: "This recreation ground was purchased by public subscription and was opened on 1 June 1920 for the benefits of the inhabitants of Send as a memorial to the sailors and soldiers who fell and in grateful recognition of those in the village who took part in the Great War of 1914–1918. Trustees: S. S. Boorman, A. H. Lancaster, J. A. Shirer, W. M. Grant, F. W. Morgan Jones, W. G. Whitbourn."

A stone tablet on the north wall of the nave inside the parish church bears this inscription: "The peal of six bells was hung as a memorial to those of this parish who lost their lives in two world wars and as a thank offering for victory." The names listed are the same as on the Celtic-cross memorial but with the addition of five people "killed by enemy action": V. Bowers, H. C. Parsons, H. E. Privett, M. J. Privett and V. Privett. Members of the Privett family were killed on 21 August 1944 by the explosion of a V1 flying bomb which landed on their home at Burnt Common Cottages.

== Demography and housing ==
The 2011 United Kingdom census reported Send's population to be 4,245, an increase of 107 since the 2001 census. The number of households was 1,665, an increase of 42 since the 2001 census.

2011 Census Homes
Output area	Detached	Semi-detached	Terraced	Flats and apartments	Caravans/temporary/mobile homes	Shared between households
(Civil Parish)	908	551	90	116	0	0

Of the accommodation in the region, 28% was composed of detached houses, and 22.6% was composed of apartments.

2011 Census Key Statistics: Households
Output area	% Owned outright	% Owned with a loan	Area (hectares)
(Civil Parish)	41.3%	41.4%	695

The proportion of households in the civil parish who owned their home outright compares to the regional average of 35.1%. The proportion who owned their home with a loan compares to the regional average of 32.5%. The remaining % is made up of rented dwellings (plus a negligible % of households living rent-free).

=== Occupations ===
The high street provides some professional occupations and technical businesses, the schools and nearby prison form most of the government merit services; other occupations existing in the parish include manufacturing, agriculture and food and leisure-related categories of employment. Nonetheless, the village demographically has a very high proportion of professionals and in relation to these, it is part of the London Commuter Belt, with the City of London being the main destination by train from Woking. The nearest entertainment and large retail premises are in Woking. A former landfill in Send is a 20 hectare plantation of short rotation coppice willow. Occupations of the 2,114 workers between the ages of 16 and 74 were broken down in the 2011 census as follows:

Category of employment	Number
Managers, Directors and Senior Officials	390
Professional Occupations	485
Associate Professional and Technical Occupations	310
Administrative and Secretarial Occupations	265
Skilled Trades Occupations	215
Caring, Leisure and Other Service Occupations	151
Sales and Customer Service Occupations	110
Process, Plant and Machine Operatives	69
Elementary Occupations	119

=== Population over time ===
Data for 1801–1961 is available at Britain Through Time. The loss of Ripley in 1878 ecclesiastically and in 1933 as a secular administrative unit (civil parish) represented almost half of the land area of the village.

Population of Send
Year	1801	1811	1821	1831	1841	1851	1881	1891	1901
Population	1,024	1,090	1,283	1,483	1,538	1,555	1,855	2,049	2,301
Year	1911	1921	1931	1941	1951	1961			
Population	2,544	2,847	3,278	n/a	2,788	3,680			

== Popular culture ==
=== Music ===
The Send Barns Orchestra, conducted by Jeremy Gilbert, are credited on the 1977 Anthony Phillips album The Geese and the Ghost, large parts of which were recorded at his home in Send.

=== Film location ===
In 1969, a scene for The Telling Bone episode of Catweazle, featuring Geoffrey Bayldon, filmed two backgrounds in Send: Church Lane using the lych gate and Send Parish Church and 1 Heath Farm Cottages, Tannery Lane as "Sam's Cottage". "Sam Woodyard" was played by Neil McCarthy. In 1999, scenes for The Mrs Bradley Mysteries, starring Dame Diana Rigg and Neil Dudgeon, were filmed in the churchyard.

In April 2009, scenes for a BBC Drama production of Jane Austen's "Emma", adapted by Sandy Welch and starring Romola Garai, Michael Gambon, Jonny Lee Miller, Blake Ritson, Dan Fredenburgh, Tamsin Greig and Rupert Evans, were filmed in and around Send Parish Church.

In August 2012, Willow Drive was used to film scenes for Cuban Fury, starring Nick Frost.

== Prison ==
Counterintuitively now named after the village is HMP Send, a women's prison on the site of a former isolation hospital. Following parish area reduction in the south the jail is now in the southern part of the parish of Ripley surrounded by farmland and woodland.

== Sport ==
Send's local football team is Send United. There is sailing on Papercourt Lake, which is owned by Papercourt Sailing Club. There is fishing on the River Wey and in the nearby sandpits.

The Concorde Cricket Club, formerly the British Aerospace Cricket Club, is based at Sendholme on Potters Lane. Sendholme was the home of William Hargreaves Leese, who played for the Marylebone Cricket Club in the late 19th century.

== Military residents and events ==
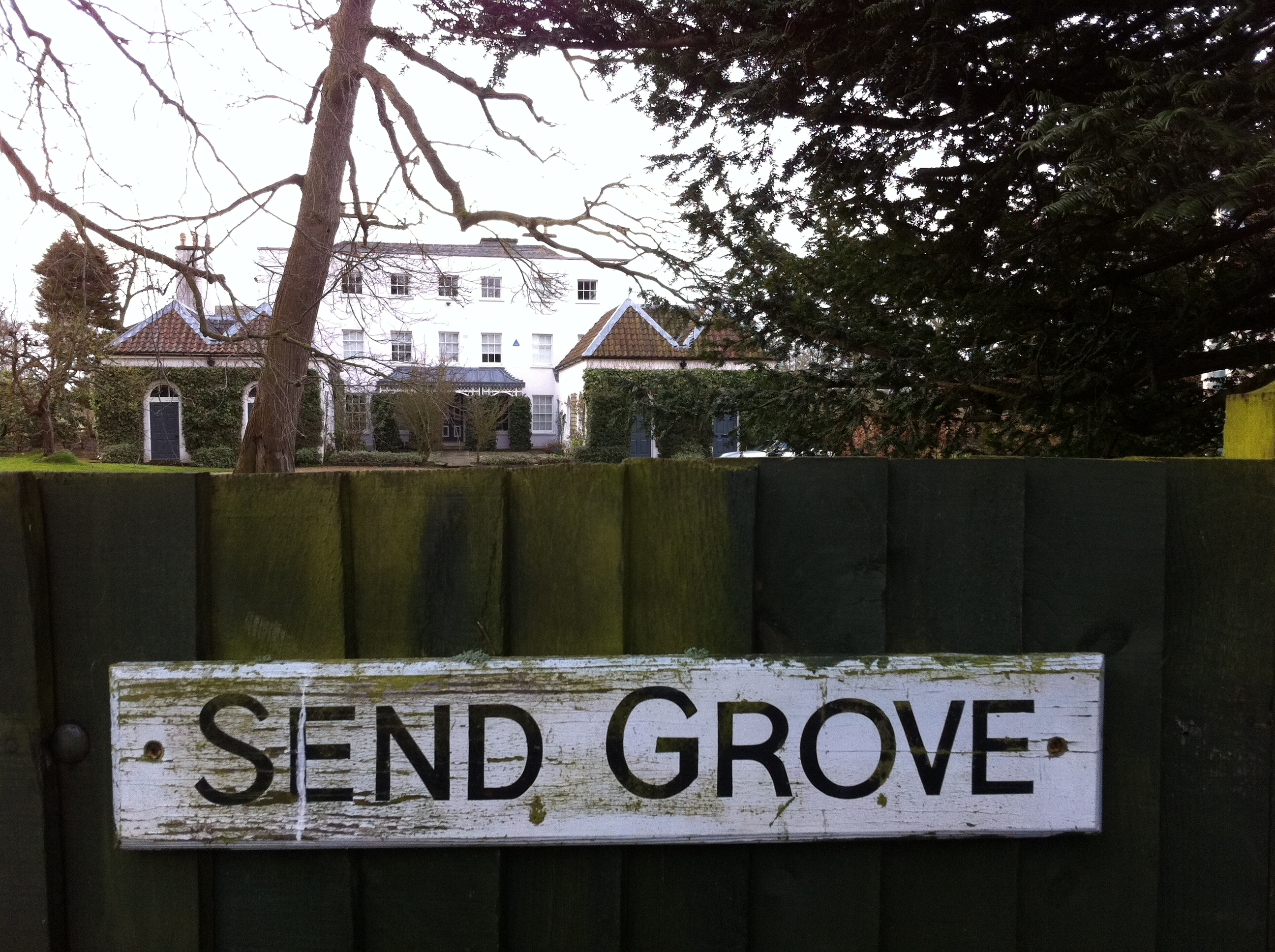
Send Grove

Lieutenant-General William Evelyn Colonel of the 29th Foot in the British Army and Member of Parliament for Helston (1767–74), a son of Sir John Evelyn of Wotton, established his home at Send Grove, Church Lane, and he laid out the grounds. On his death, in 1783, it was bought by Admiral Sir Francis William Drake, Governor of Newfoundland (1750–1752), second in command to Rodney in his victory of 1782 over De Grasse. As Rear-Admiral, Drake flew his flag on HMS Victory from 26 September to 29 December 1780.

Flight Lieutenant Robin R Skene, one of the first members of the Royal Flying Corps, was buried in the churchyard after crashing in his Blériot monoplane shortly after take-off from Netheravon, Wiltshire, in 1914 on 12 August en route to Dover and France at the start of the First World War. He and mechanic R. Barlow were the first members of the Royal Flying Corps to die on active duty and among the first British casualties of the war.

== Flooding ==
Following flooding in the east of Send Marsh in 2000, when 16 properties were flooded to a depth of 1m, causing £600,000 of damage, a five-month Environment Agency (EA) scheme costing £400,000 began in February 2007 to reduce the risk from the East Clandon stream. The stream was diverted in the 1870s for brick-making and could revert to its original course when flooded. Demonstrated by the relatively few properties affected, almost all built-up areas in the parish are not subject to flood risk according to EA data.

== Notable residents ==
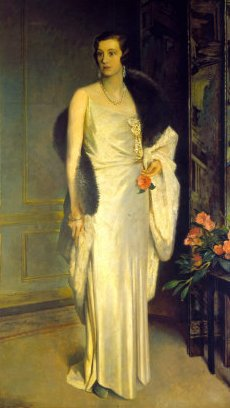
Loelia Lindsay, Duchess of Westminster, by Glyn Philpot

- The British guitarist Eric Clapton spent two years as a pupil at Send's one-time secondary modern school (which became St. Bede's Church of England Junior School).
- Musician Paul Weller lived for several years in Vicarage Lane.
- Anthony Phillips, former Genesis guitarist, lived and recorded at Send Barns on Send Barns Lane until 1981.
- Elizabeth Macarthur-Onslow (1840–1911), an Australian pastoralist and property manager born in Menangle, New South Wales, died during a visit to England and is buried in Send churchyard.
- In 1911 Send Grove was the property of and occupied by the Misses Onslow.
- Woodhill was the principal home of the Dowager Countess of Wharncliffe.
- Sir Herbert Holt (1856–1941), divided his time between Send Grove and his other home in Montreal's Golden Square Mile. His son, also called Herbert, inherited Send Grove after his death.
- Loelia Lindsay (1902–1993), Duchess of Westminster, lived at Send Grove and later at the Old Vicarage in Church Lane.
- Former Conservative Chancellor of the Exchequer Philip Hammond lives in Send Barns.
- British entrepreneur, soldier and spy Charles Letts was born in Send.
- The children's novelist Monica Edwards lived at Send from 1939 to 1947.
- Barrister, Liberal MP and first class cricketer Joseph Leese lived at Send Holme from 1875 until 1914.
