= Donald John Dean =

Recipient of the Victoria Cross (1897–1985)

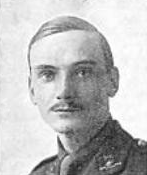
- Born: 19 April 1897; Herne Hill, London
- Died: 9 December 1985 (aged 88); Sittingbourne, Kent
- Military career
- Allegiance: United Kingdom
- Branch: British Army
- Service years: 1915–1945
- Rank: Colonel
- Service number: 21378
- Units: London Regiment; The Queen's Own Royal West Kent Regiment; Royal Pioneer Corps
- Conflicts: World War I World War II
- Awards: Victoria Cross; Order of the British Empire; Order of the Dannebrog; Territorial Decoration

Colonel Donald John Dean VC OBE TD DL (19 April 1897 – 9 December 1985) was a British Army officer and an English recipient of the Victoria Cross, the highest and most prestigious award for gallantry in the face of the enemy that can be awarded to British and Commonwealth forces.

== Early life ==
Donald John Dean was born on 19 April 1897 in Herne Hill, South London, to John H and Grace Dean. He was educated at Quernmore College.

== Military career ==
=== First World War ===
At the outbreak of war in August 1914, Dean attempted to enlist but was rejected because he was under-age. He was able to become a special constable and also joined the Volunteer Training Corps, a part-time home defence force. When he turned 18 in April 1915, he attempted to enlist again at his local Territorial Force depot, this time successfully. Dean served as a private with the 28th London (Artists Rifles) Regiment in the Ypres Salient and during the Battle of the Somme. In October 1916 he was commissioned into the Queen's Own Royal West Kent Regiment and fought at Vimy Ridge and around Givenchy.

He was 21 years old, and a temporary lieutenant in the 8th Battalion, The Queen's Own Royal West Kent Regiment, when the following action took place for which he was awarded the Victoria Cross.

During the period 24 September – 26 September 1918, north-west of Lens, France, Lieutenant Dean with his platoon held an advance post established in a newly captured enemy trench. The post was ill-prepared for defence and the lieutenant worked unceasingly with his men consolidating the position, under very heavy fire. Five times in all the post was attacked and on each occasion the attack was repulsed. Throughout the whole of this time Lieutenant Dean inspired his command with his own contempt of danger and set the highest example of valour, leadership and devotion to duty.

On 15 February 1919, Dean was presented with the Victoria Cross by King George V at Buckingham Palace and was given a civic reception in his home town of Sittingbourne.

=== Interwar period ===
Following the war, Dean took up part-time soldiering with the Territorial Army, being appointed captain in the 4th Battalion, Royal East Kent Regiment (The Buffs) in July 1921. He became a major in 1930 and took command of the battalion in 1936 with the rank of lieutenant colonel.

=== Second World War ===
After mobilisation in 1939, Dean was informed by his divisional commander, Major General Edmund Osborne, that he was to be replaced by a regular officer as Osborne believed that Territorial officers were not efficient enough to command a battalion. Although bitterly disappointed, Dean agreed to accept the post of Group Commander of No. 5 Group, Auxiliary Military Pioneer Corps, despite never having heard of either the appointment or the corps. He arrived at the group's depot at Butlin's Clacton holiday camp in Essex in October 1939. Dean was the youngest officer in the group, and although there were some experienced reservists amongst the other ranks, the majority had volunteered to escape unemployment or were conscripts who had been graded as unfit for any other military duty.

On deployment to France with the British Expeditionary Force, No. 5 Group were issued with one rifle between every four men and undertook labouring tasks in the Doullens area, near Amiens, without any opportunity for training. In May 1940, the group were threatened by the advancing Germans and were ordered to evacuate but were without transport. Dean therefore marched his men to Saint-Pol where they attempted to find a train. With the rail system in chaos, Dean resorted to bribing the station master so that he could requisition a train and following a brief fire-fight with the leading German units the Group were able to reach Wimereux near Boulogne-sur-Mer. Here Dean was ordered to send part of his force to Boulogne harbour to act as dock labour for 20th Guards Brigade who were arriving to defend the port.

The Guards established a defensive perimeter around the town and were told to expect reinforcements from Calais, however these never arrived as the Germans had occupied the coast road. Therefore, Dean was asked to provide a force to fill a 3-mile (4.8 km) gap in the defences. Selecting 800 of his pioneers, Dean armed them with rifles taken from the remainder who were sent on to the harbour to begin evacuating to England. Lacking any heavy weapons, Dean directed the construction of roadblocks from whatever was available, which it was hoped might delay the advancing tanks. On 23 May, the Germans attacked in earnest; in fierce fighting at their barricades, the pioneers claimed to have destroyed one tank by igniting petrol underneath it. The pioneers were the last unit to pull back from the perimeter, because the runner bringing the order to withdraw could not locate Dean since there were no radios. Eventually arriving at the harbour, Dean ensured that as many of his men as possible were evacuated before being the last man to board the final destroyer to depart.

Later he served in Madagascar and Italy, earning two Mentions in Despatches and a promotion to full colonel in 1945. He also served as a Deputy Lieutenant of Kent.

== Personal life ==
In 1923, Dean married Marjorie Wood. They had one son and one daughter.

== Sources ==
- Biography

== Additional reading ==
- Gliddon, Gerald (2014) [2002]. Road to Victory 1918. VCs of the First World War. The History Press. ISBN 978-0750953610.
- Ingleton, Roy (2011). Kent VCs. Pen and Sword Books. ISBN 978-1848844094.
