= Leese baronets =

Extinct baronetcy in the Baronetage of the United Kingdom

The Leese baronetcy, of Sendholme in Send in the County of Surrey, was a title in the Baronetage of the United Kingdom. It was created on 15 July 1908 for Joseph Leese, Member of Parliament for Accrington from 1892 to 1910.

The 3rd Baronet was a lieutenant general in the Coldstream Guards and served as Commander-in-Chief of the Allied Land Forces in South-East Asia from 1944 to 1945 and as General Officer Commanding-in-Chief of Eastern Command from 1945 to 1947.

The baronetcy became extinct on the death of the 4th Baronet in 1979.

== Leese baronets, of Send Holme (1908) ==
- Sir Joseph Francis Leese, 1st Baronet (1845–1914)
- Sir William Hargreaves Leese, 2nd Baronet (1868–1937)
- Sir Oliver William Hargreaves Leese, 3rd Baronet (1894–1978)
- Sir Alexander William Leese, 4th Baronet (1909–1979)

Baronetage of the United Kingdom
| Preceded by Hollins baronets | Leese baronets of Send Holme; 15 July 1908 | Succeeded by Jehangir baronets |
