= Boulogne Bowl =

The Boulogne Bowl was presented to 168 Pioneer Regiment RLC(v) by the Royal Pioneer Association on 15 November 1997 to commemorate the Defence of Boulogne in May 1940 by the Regiment's predecessors.

== Historical background ==
During the night of 9 – 10 May 1940, Germany invaded Belgium, the Netherlands and Luxembourg; and under pressure, the French Army, and the British Expeditionary Force, were ordered to withdraw. The enemy advanced towards Amiens and Arras with the intention of reaching the Channel coast. On the night of 20 May the German army reached the sea at Abbeville having transversed and cut the communications of the northern armies. All forward elements of the British Expeditionary Force were held in a vast pocket from which there was no escape other than by sea. In that pocket was 5 Group commanded by Lieutenant Colonel D J Dean VC TD which included 68 Company under the command of Major S H Winterbottom MC. During the third week of May the encircled British forces began their retirement to the Channel ports of Dunkirk, Calais and Boulogne: 5 Group were ordered to Boulogne.

Boulogne had been used only as a port and no British garrison was stationed there, although there was in the town a considerable number of French and Belgian troops, most of whom were untrained recruits. When 5 Group now numbering about 1500 all ranks arrived in Wimereux the Pioneers became the largest British force in the area and Colonel Dean reported to Brigadier Foxx-Pitt for instructions.

== The action ==
Two battalions of the 20th Guard Brigade the 2nd Irish Guards and the 2nd Welsh Guards under the command of Brigadier W Fox-Pitt had arrived from England with orders to hold Boulogne to "the last man and the last round". The Irish Guards had taken up a position with their right flank at La Postel on the coast and their left on the banks of the River Liane; the Welsh Guards holding a line from the left flank of the Irish Guards and along the western slopes, of the Mont Lambert ridge which commanded the greater part of the town and harbour to St Martin. The two battalions covered a six-mile front and were, therefore, thin on the ground. Brigadier Fox-Pitt asked for 150 Pioneers to be sent to reinforce the Welsh Guards.

During the afternoon of 22 May an attack with tanks and artillery was made by the German 2nd Armoured Division against the Irish Guards; this was repulsed. As darkness fell a further attack was made on the front held by the Welsh Guards, again the enemy was repulsed and it became apparent that he was feeling for a weak spot in the defence Colonel Dean withdrew 5 Group into Boulogne and on instructions from Brigadier Fox-Pitt took up a position covering the area from the Welsh Guards left flank at St Martin to the coast at the Casino, this movement being completed by the early hours of the morning of 23 May. Road blocks were constructed from the deserted lorries and cars reinforced by furniture and materials from bombed houses. Scarcely had 5 Group taken its place in the line when a further German attack was made on the Pioneer front. After some heavy fighting the enemy again withdrew though this was followed by a more resolute attack against more of the pioneer roadblocks. Such an attack had been anticipated and when an attacking tank was at an angle which precluded its guns from firing on the defenders the road block was drenched with petrol and set on fire forcing the tank to retreat. Under cover of smoke from the fire a further road block was constructed. Throughout the whole of the operation the defenders were being dive bombed and shelled by mortars as well as being under small arms fire.

In the early evening of 23 May during Colonel Dean's absence, Colonel Stainer of the Welsh Guards had called at 5 Group Headquarters and informed the Adjutant that the Guards were withdrawing to the harbour for evacuation, at the same time paying high tribute to the 150 Pioneers attached to his battalion. He also stated that the bridge across the river, the only British escape route, was shortly to be blown. Since he had been given to understand that the Guards were to hold Boulogne at all costs, and as it was little more than twenty-four hours since their arrival in France, this information was received by Colonel Dean with some surprise. Unfortunately the Welsh Guards had commenced their withdrawal before Colonel Dean received the message and had an opportunity of realigning the Pioneers at the right road blocks which he held; in consequence his right flank was now exposed to the German advancing troops infiltrating through a gap Using men of 47 Company which he had held in reserve he relieved two of his forward positions; four others were able to retire without trouble: the remaining two were overrun by the enemy and the men killed, wounded or taken prisoner. With the enemy now at close quarters Colonel Dean's responsibility became twofold, to fight a rearguard action in order to protect the retiring Welsh Guards and try and save as many of his own men as possible. The Group was slowly withdrawn to the Gare Maritime where they manned the barricades which had been left by the Guards Brigade, 5 Group now held all approaches to the harbour. The 150 Pioneers who had been lent to the Welsh Guards, by whom they had left behind on embarkation, rejoined the Group.

The Group was now under continuous tank and heavy mortar fire from across the river, and rifle fire from the German infantry closing in on them. As darkness fell Major Verity of 47 Company was wounded and Colonel Dean knocked unconscious. Toward midnight Colonel Dean recovered consciousness and again resumed command. Except for intermittent rifle fire the fighting had now died down, the Gare Maritime continued to burn fiercely, The rearguard of Pioneers, now reduced to about 600 all ranks, was withdrawn to the quay where company commanders sorted out and reorganised their men in preparation for the final stand they expected to make at day-break.

Shortly after 2 a.m. on 24 May it was reported that a vessel was approaching the harbour, in the hope that it was a British ship Colonel Dean signalled it with his torch, upon which HMS Vimeria backed slowly in to the end of the mole in the eerie silence which lay upon the town. Rounding up the many stragglers from other regiments in the area Colonel Dean got them on board and finally 5 Group embarked soon after 3 a.m. after fighting alone for six hours. With 1,400 men on board the Vimeria sailed for England, the last ship to leave the port before it finally fell into German hands, and all organised resistance in Boulogne came to an end.

== Tradition ==
Over a period of years it became the practice of the officers of the 68 Company RPC(V) (which was to become 102 Pioneer Squadron RLC(V)) to honour and drink a toast to ‘The Defenders of Boulogne. In 1979 at Tregantel Fort, Cornwall, a ceremonial parade and march past took place commemorating the 39th anniversary of the Battle in which 68 Company took part. Colonel Dean VC ID attended the annual Past and Present Officers’ Dinner on several occasions and met the current Honorary Colonel of 168 Pioneer Regiment RLC (V) Brigadier C B Telfer CBE, and Colonel K J Broom TD, a previous Honorary Colonel for the Pioneer Territorial Army. To commemorate the Defence of Boulogne a piece of silver, known as the Boulogne Bowl, was presented to 168 Pioneer Regiment Royal Logistic Corps (Volunteers), the successors of the Defenders of Boulogne on behalf of the Royal Pioneer Association, by Colonel Ken Broom on 15 November 1997. It was received on behalf of all ranks by the Commanding Officer, Lieutenant Colonel Ron Gatepain, with the assurance that it would be made available for any informal occasion held by the Regiment.
