= 5th Guards Armoured Brigade =

5th Guards Armoured Brigade 5th Guards Brigade
- Active: 1941–1945
- Country: United Kingdom
- Branch: Armour
- Part of: Guards Armoured Division
- Engagements: North West Europe Campaign

The 5th Guards Armoured Brigade was an armoured brigade of the British Army, a component unit of the Guards Armoured Division, that served in the Second World War in North-west Europe from June 1944 until May 1945.

== History ==
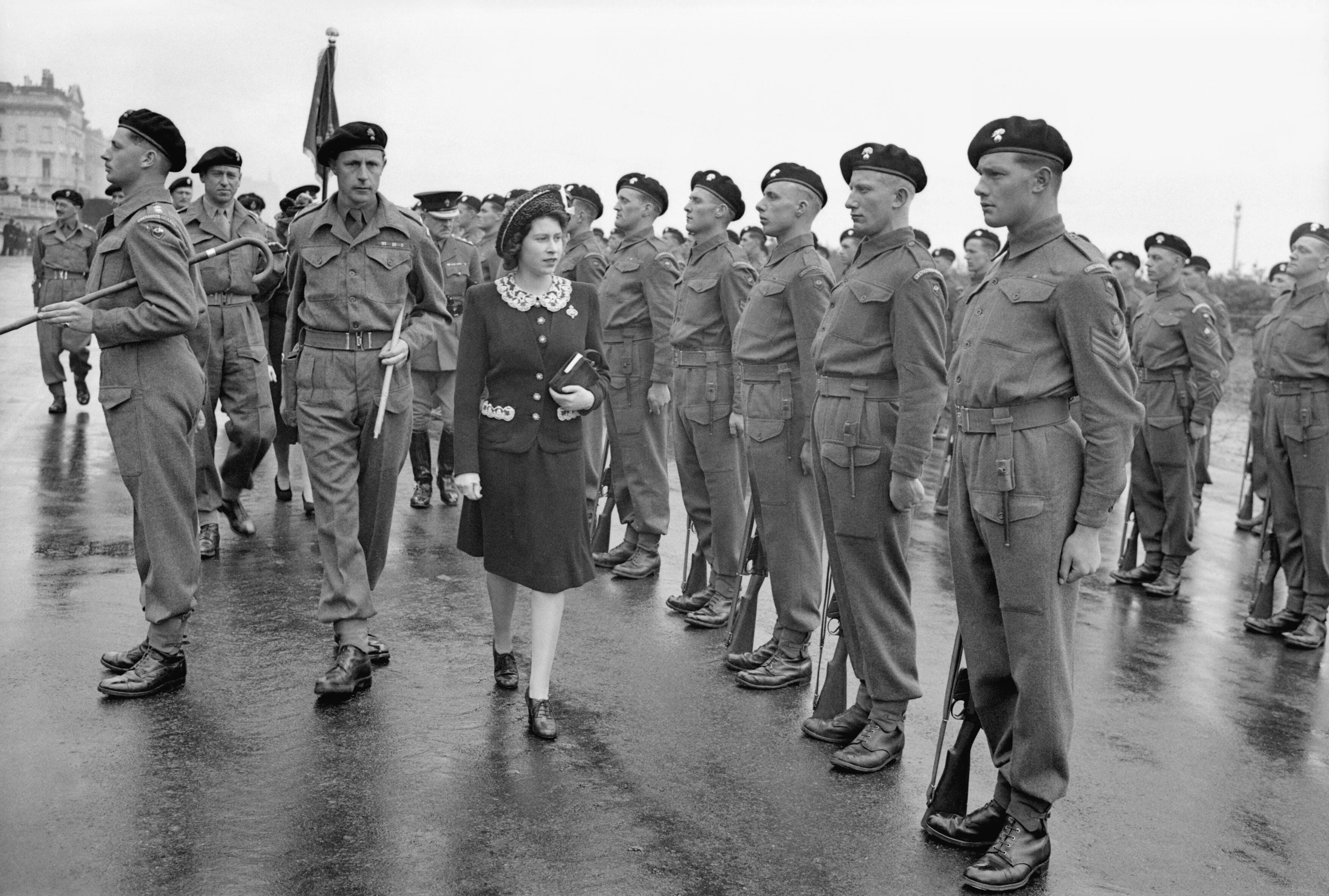
Princess Elizabeth inspecting an honour guard during a Royal visit to 2nd (Armoured) Battalion Grenadier Guards, 5th Guards Armoured Brigade, Guards Armoured Division, at Hove, 17 May 1944.

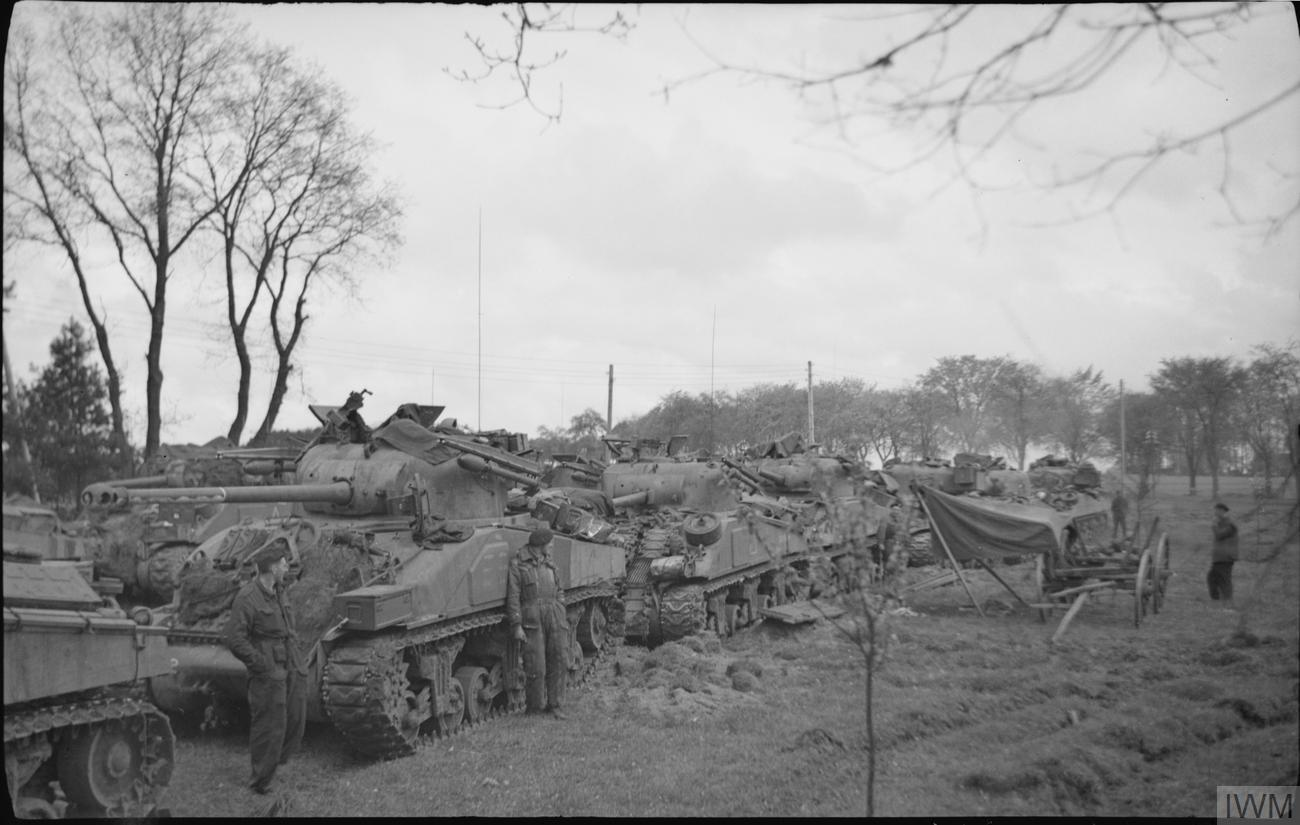
Rocket-armed Sherman tanks of the 1st Battalion Coldstream Guards, 5th Guards Armoured Brigade, 28 April 1945

This brigade was converted from the 20th Infantry Brigade (Guards) on 15 September 1941. It was stationed in the United Kingdom on training and home defence duties, anticipating a potential German invasion. The brigade remained in the United Kingdom until 30 June 1944 when it arrived in Normandy with the rest of the Guards Armoured Division as part of Operation Overlord. It took part in Operation Goodwood during the Battle of Caen. The brigade served throughout the North West Europe Campaign. On 12 June 1945 it was converted to the 5th Guards Brigade.

=== Commanders ===
- Brig. W.A.F.L. Fox-Pitt
- Lieut. Col. R. Myddleton
- Brig. C.M. Dillwyn-Venables-Llewelyn
- Brig. Norman Wilmshurst Gwatkin 1943–45

== Component Units ==
Structure upon formation in 1941:

- Headquarters
- 1st Battalion, Coldstream Guards - Armoured
- 1st Battalion, Grenadier Guards - Motorized Infantry
- 2nd Battalion, Grenadier Guards - Armoured
- 2nd Battalion, Irish Guards - Armoured

== See also ==
- British Armoured formations of World War II
- List of British brigades of the Second World War
