= 20th Independent Infantry Brigade =

20th Independent Infantry Brigade (Guards)
- Active: April 1940 – September 1941
- Country: United Kingdom
- Branch: British Army
- Type: Infantry
- Size: Brigade
- Engagements: Battle of Boulogne

Commanders
- Notable commanders: Sir Oliver Leese; William Fox-Pitt

The 20th Independent Infantry Brigade was an infantry brigade of the British Army, raised during the Second World War.

== History ==
The brigade was formed in Aldershot Command in April 1940. It served during the Battle of France in 1940, briefly defending Boulogne in May 1940 (22–23 May 1940) before being successfully evacuated. After return to the United Kingdom, the brigade served in Eastern Command and London District.

On 15 September 1941, the brigade was converted into the 5th Guards Armoured Brigade; a component of the Guards Armoured Division. It served with distinction through the battles in Normandy, France, Belgium, the Netherlands, and Germany.

== Commanders ==
The following officers commanded the brigade:

- Brigadier Oliver Leese (from 22 April 1940)
- Brigadier William Fox-Pitt (from 10 May 1940)

== Order of battle ==
The following units comprised the brigade:

- 2nd Battalion, Grenadier Guards
- 2nd Battalion, Welsh Guards
- 5th Battalion, Loyal Regiment (North Lancashire) – (motorcycle unit, until 22 May 1940)
- 1st Battalion, Royal Norfolk Regiment – (joined 22 July 1940)
- 20th Independent Infantry Brigade (Guards) Anti-Tank Company
- 275th Anti-Tank Battery (less one Troop) of 69th Anti-Tank Regiment Royal Artillery – (attached during Boulogne operation)
- 225th Light Field Ambulance Royal Army Medical Corps – (joined July 1940)
- 20th Independent Infantry Brigade (Guards) Company Royal Army Service Corps – (joined July 1940)
- 3rd Royal Tank Regiment
