= Oliver Leese =

British Army general (1894–1978)

Lieutenant-General Sir Oliver Leese Bt KCB CBE DSO
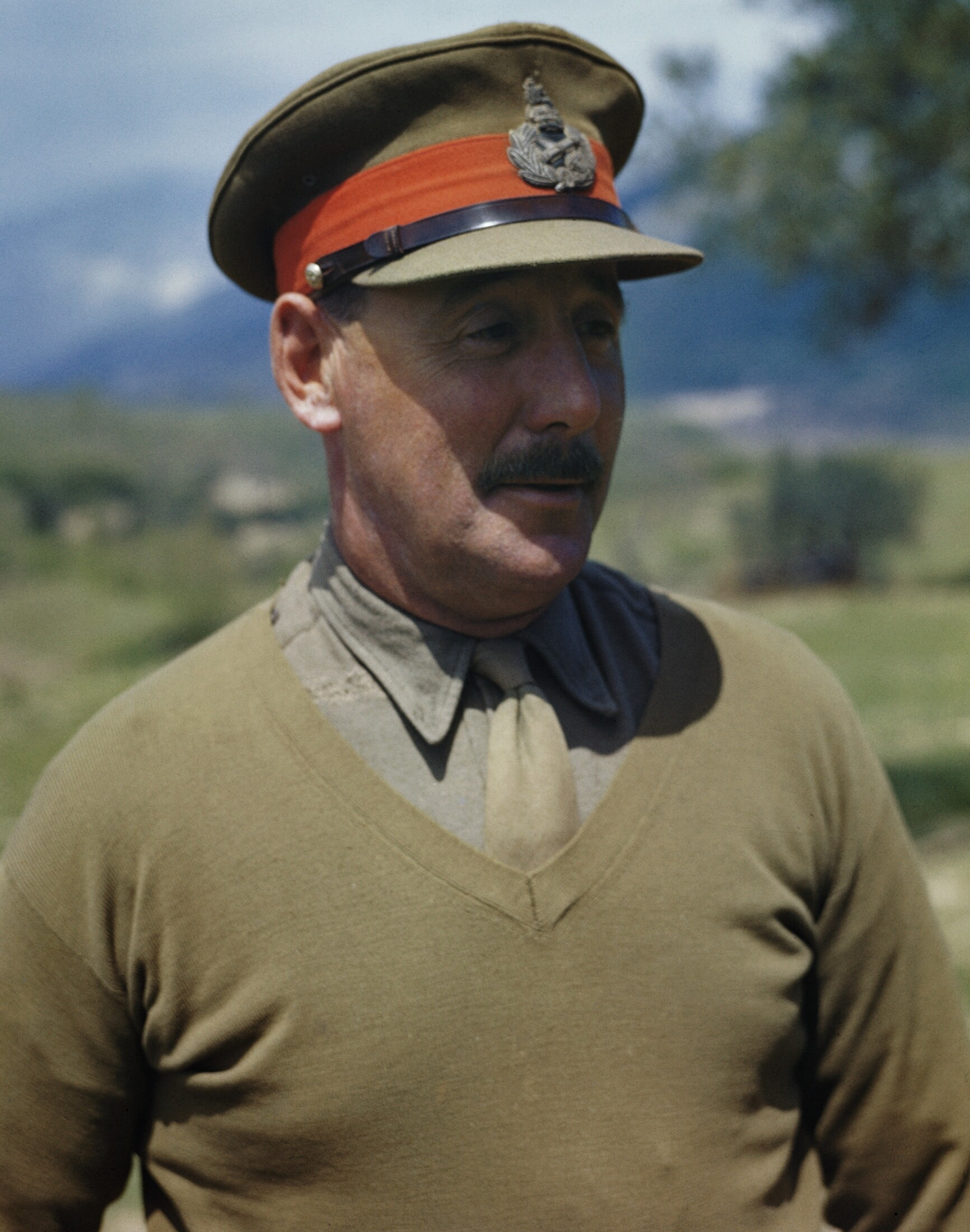
- Leese in Italy on 30 April 1944
- Born: 27 October 1894; Westminster, London, England
- Died: 22 January 1978 (aged 83); Llanrhaeadr, Wales
- Military career
- Allegiance: United Kingdom
- Branch: British Army
- Service years: 1914–1947
- Rank: Lieutenant-General
- Nickname: "Baron Leese"
- Service number: 1722
- Unit: Coldstream Guards
- Commands: Eastern Command (1945–1947); Allied Land Forces South-East Asia (1944–1945); Eighth Army (1943–1944); XXX Corps (1942–1943); Guards Armoured Division (1941–1942); 15th (Scottish) Infantry Division (1941); West Sussex County Division (1940–1941); 29th Infantry Brigade (1940); 20th Independent Infantry Brigade (Guards) (1940); 1st Battalion, Coldstream Guards (1936–1938)
- Conflicts: First World War; Second World War
- Awards: Knight Commander of the Order of the Bath; Commander of the Order of the British Empire; Distinguished Service Order; Mentioned in despatches (2); Commander of the Legion of Merit (United States); Legion of Honour (France); Croix de Guerre (France); Virtuti Militari (Poland)

Lieutenant-General Sir Oliver William Hargreaves Leese, 3rd Baronet, KCB, CBE, DSO (27 October 1894 – 22 January 1978) was a senior British Army officer who saw distinguished active service during both the world wars. He commanded XXX Corps in North Africa and Sicily, serving under General Sir Bernard Montgomery, before going on to command the Eighth Army in the Italian Campaign throughout most of 1944.

== Early life and First World War ==
Oliver William Hargreaves Leese was born on 27 October 1894 at St. Ermin's, Westminster, London, the first of four children of William Hargreaves Leese (later 2nd Baronet), a barrister, and Violet Mary Sandeman. He was educated at Ludgrove and Eton. In 1909, while at Eton, he joined the Officers' Training Corps (OTC).

Early in World War I, he joined the British Army and was gazetted in the Special Reserve of Officers as a second lieutenant into the Coldstream Guards on 15 September 1914, later gazetted in the Land Forces on 15 May 1915. Despite receiving only five weeks of training, Leese was sent to France in mid-October 1914 and was posted to the 3rd Battalion, Coldstream Guards, part of the 4th (Guards) Brigade of the 2nd Division, near Ypres, Belgium. However, on 20 October, a week before Leese's 20th birthday, he was wounded, the first of three woundings he was to receive during the war, after being hit in the back by shrapnel.

He returned to England for treatment, and in 1915 returned to France, serving this time with the 2nd Battalion, Coldstream Guards, also part of the 4th Brigade, 2nd Division, where he experienced trench warfare throughout most of the year, in July suffered a second wounding, receiving multiple wounds to the face, but he remained on duty. In September his battalion, now transferred to the 1st Guards Brigade of the newly created Guards Division, fought in the Battle of Loos and, on 3 October, Leese was promoted to lieutenant. The next few months were spent holding the trenches, with no major engagements taking place.

Leese was wounded for the third time during the Somme offensive in September 1916, an action in which he was mentioned in despatches and awarded the Distinguished Service Order (DSO). The citation to his DSO, which was gazetted in November 1916, read:

For conspicuous gallantry in action. He led the assault against a strongly held part of the enemy's line, which was stopping the whole attack. He personally accounted for many of the enemy and enabled the attack to proceed. He was wounded during the fight.

== Between the wars ==
After the war, he remained in the British Army, being promoted captain in 1921, and attending the Staff College, Camberley from 1927 to 1928. Returning briefly to his battalion after graduation, in November 1929 he was appointed as brigade major to the 1st Infantry Brigade (Guards) and was formally promoted to major a few days later. He was promoted to brevet lieutenant-colonel on 1 July 1933. He relinquished the assignment of DAA and QMG of London District on 11 November 1933.

On 18 January 1933 Leese married a granddaughter of Sir Baldwyn Leighton, 8th Baronet, Margaret Alice (died 1964), daughter of Cuthbert Leighton (recte Leicester-Warren), DL, JP, (1877–1954), of Tabley House, Knutsford, by Hilda Margaret Davenport; they had no children. Lady Leese's brother was the last of the line to own the Tabley estate which upon his death was eventually taken over by The Victoria University of Manchester.

From 1932 to 1938 Leese held a number of staff appointments and was promoted to lieutenant-colonel in December 1936, brevet-colonel in September 1938 and colonel in October 1938. In September 1938 he was posted to India to be a GSO1 instructor at the Staff College, Quetta. He had succeeded to the baronetcy on his father's death on 17 January 1937.

== Second World War ==
=== France and Belgium ===
The Second World War started while Leese was still in India, as the Chief Instructor at the Staff College, Quetta. Each course usually lasted two years but had been reduced to a single year due to the outbreak of the war, with plans made to reduce it to five months to enable more staff officers to be produced in the rapidly expanding British and British-Indian armies. Despite this, and the fact that Leese was selected as a possible Commandant of the college, he was anxious to return to Europe where the fighting was sure to be. His wish was granted in March 1940 and he returned to England at the end of that month.

Shortly after his arrival, he assumed command of the hastily raised 20th Independent Infantry Brigade (Guards), which was to participate in the ultimately doomed Norwegian campaign although this did not happen. Due to the German Army's invasion of Western Europe, which began on 10 May, Leese received a signal ordering him to France and to report to General Lord Gort, Commander-in-Chief (C-in-C) of the British Expeditionary Force. He was assigned to act as Lieutenant General Henry Pownall's Deputy Chief of Staff. Leese arrived at the BEF's General Headquarters (GHQ), then at Arras, on the evening of the German assault. On 11 May, he was promoted to the acting rank of major general, after having been promoted to the acting rank of brigadier just nine days earlier. Four days after his arrival, he established an Advanced Headquarters at Renaix in order to be closer to the BEF, now stationed on the Dyle Line. Over the following days, the BEF began retreating to a series of river lines and Gort's GHQ was moved to Wahagnies.

By 18 May, with the situation becoming worse by the day, Leese prepared an emergency plan for the BEF to retreat to Dunkirk, although it was politically impossible to go through with the plan at that time. Events moved rapidly and GHQ relocated several times, eventually arriving at La Panne, Belgium, within the Dunkirk perimeter, on 26 May. Over the next few days, the staff worked frantically to oversee the withdrawal and evacuation of the BEF back to the United Kingdom, following largely the same plan that Leese had designed. He himself was evacuated on 31 May. Throughout the campaign, Leese was "a model of cool, unruffled fortitude during the retreat to Dunkirk" and who "more than anyone, imposed some order on the BEF's withdrawal and evacuation" while booming with confidence.

A few weeks after his return to the United Kingdom, and after relinquishing his acting rank of major general, Leese was ordered to form and train a large brigade group, the 29th Infantry Brigade. The brigade was composed of four, instead of the usual three, battalions that had just returned from India, along with various supporting units such as artillery and engineers. On 30 December 1940, he was again promoted to the acting rank of major general and given command of the West Sussex County Division that also included the 29th Brigade. A month later he was moved to become General Officer Commanding (GOC) of the 15th (Scottish) Infantry Division. He retained command of the division until mid-June.

At that same time, he was delighted to be selected to become GOC of the newly created Guards Armoured Division during its formation and training. The division initially comprised the 5th and 6th Guards Armoured Brigades, both of which had three armoured regiments and a battalion of motorised infantry, along with the Guards Support Group that commanded two regiments of field artillery, an anti-tank regiment, a light anti-aircraft (LAA) regiment and one battalion of lorried infantry. The armoured regiments of the 5th and 6th Brigades were all formerly infantry battalions of the Brigade of Guards and had to be retrained, although this was hampered by poor equipment, while at the same time having to adopt new battle training techniques. "A forceful personality, Leese proved extremely energetic in getting what he wanted from the War Office and then drove his men hard to create a thoroughly well organised division within a relatively short time." His rank was upgraded to temporary major general in November, and was made substantive in December.

=== North Africa and Sicily ===
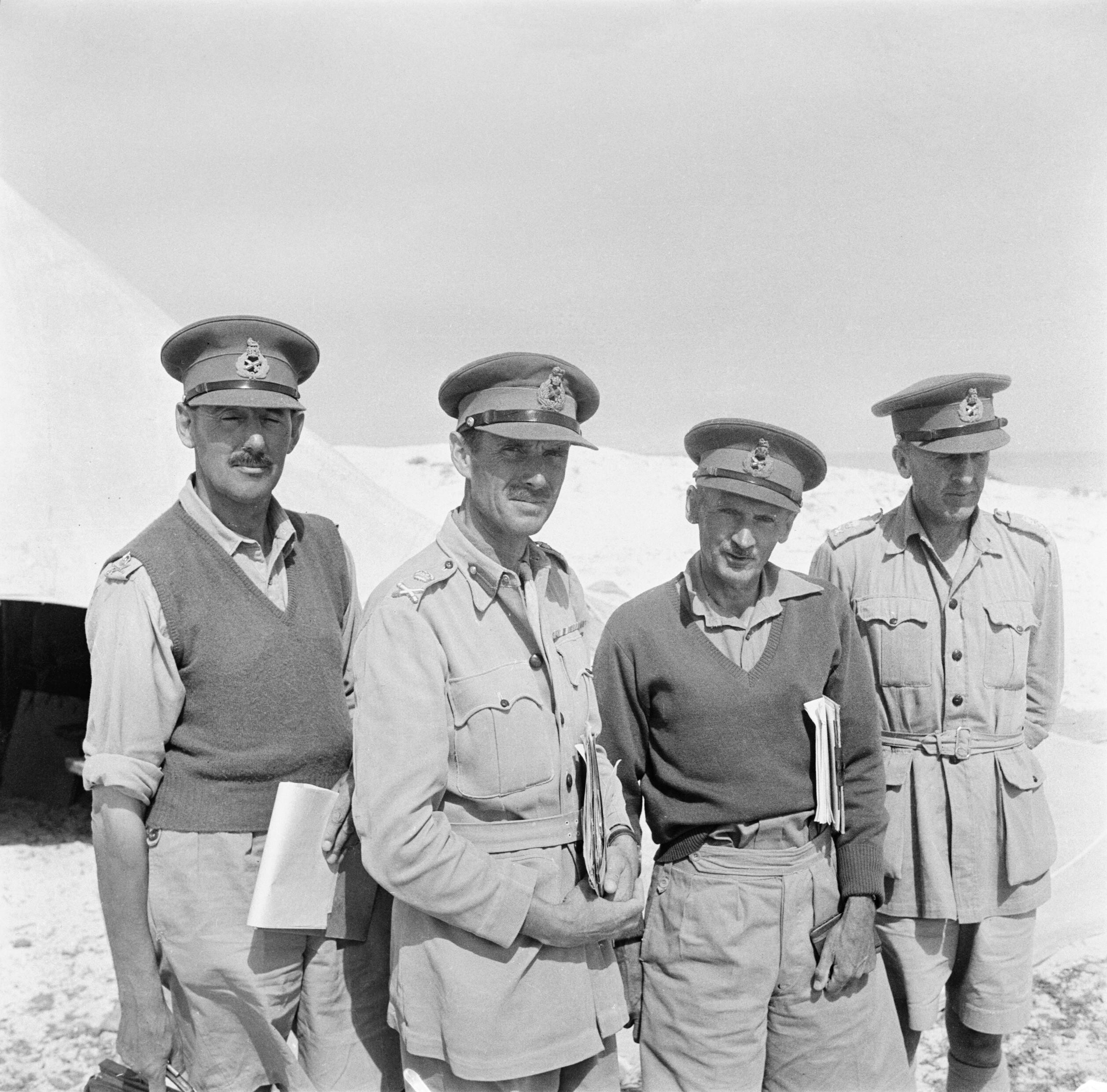
From left to right: Oliver Leese, Herbert Lumsden, Bernard Montgomery, Brian Horrocks.

In September 1942 Leese received new and unexpected orders and was sent to Egypt at the request of Lieutenant General Bernard Montgomery, the newly appointed commander of the British Eighth Army in the Western Desert. Leese left the UK on 12 September and arrived in Egypt two days later. He assumed command, as an acting lieutenant general, of XXX Corps. Montgomery had formed a high opinion of Leese when he had been one of Leese's instructors at the Staff College in the late 1920s, and had been strengthened in this opinion by Leese's work during the Dunkirk evacuation.

Leese commanded XXX Corps during the Second Battle of El Alamein and for the rest of the North African campaign, which ended in Tunis in May 1943, and was mentioned in despatches for his services.

After a short rest, XXX Corps then took part in the Allied invasion of Sicily in July–August 1943 before returning to the UK, to prepare for Allied invasion of Northwest Europe. A year after being promoted to the acting rank of lieutenant general, his rank was made temporary lieutenant general in September.

=== Italy ===
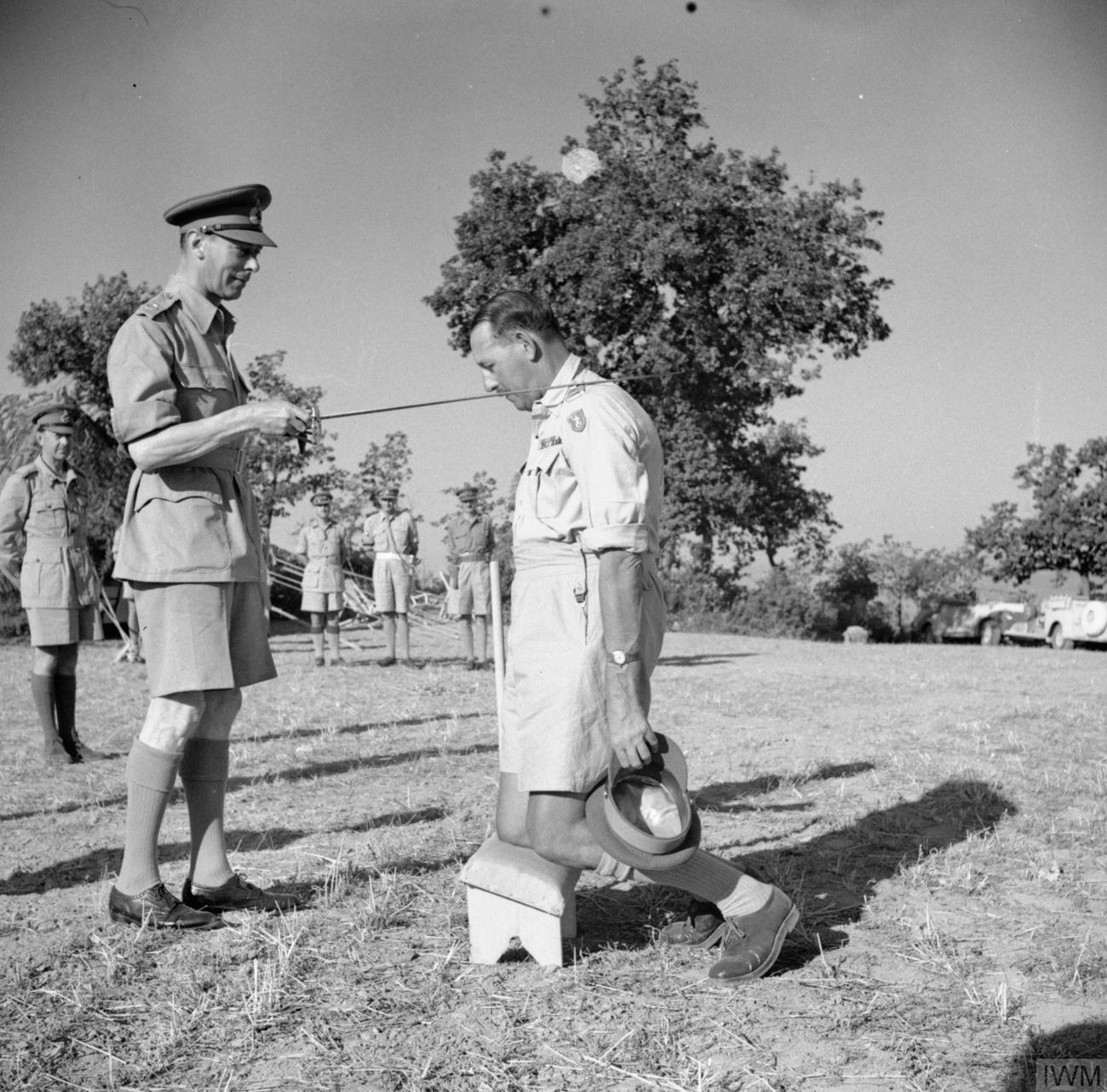
Leese receiving his knighthood in the field from King George VI on 26 July 1944.

On 24 December 1943, Leese was ordered to Italy to succeed Montgomery as the Eighth Army commander. Leese discovered that the Eighth Army had reached its first enforced halt. It and Lieutenant General Mark W. Clark's U.S. Fifth Army (both of which formed the 15th Army Group, General Sir Harold Alexander) had bogged down in front of the German Winter Line. Other than a minor action in mid-January 1944, his army remained static until May 1944. This allowed him to get to know the men and formations under his control.

In May 1944, after witnessing Clark's Fifth Army engage in numerous attempts to break through the Winter Line, he directed his army during the fourth battle of Monte Cassino. He then directed his army during Operation Olive, an assault on the Gothic Line later in the year. Despite being a victory it fell short of expectations and did not bring an early end to the fighting in Italy. Leese disliked working with Mark W. Clark. His rank of lieutenant general was made permanent in July 1944.

=== Burma and the Far East ===
In late September 1944, he was appointed Commander-in-Chief (C-in-C) of the Eleventh Army Group, based in India and directing operations in Burma, although he was not able to assume command until November by which time it had been renamed Allied Land Forces, South-East Asia (ALFSEA). Leese viewed the existing command structure as inefficient, and proceeded to appoint former members of his Eighth Army staff. The methods of the two staffs differed and the newcomers were resented. As Lieutenant General William Slim, who commanded ALFSEA's Fourteenth Army, expressed it in his memoirs "his staff... had a good deal of desert sand in its shoes, and was rather inclined to thrust Eighth Army down our throats." ALFSEA fought a successful campaign in Burma culminating with the recapture of Rangoon in early May 1945, it having been lost in 1942 to the Japanese advance at the time.

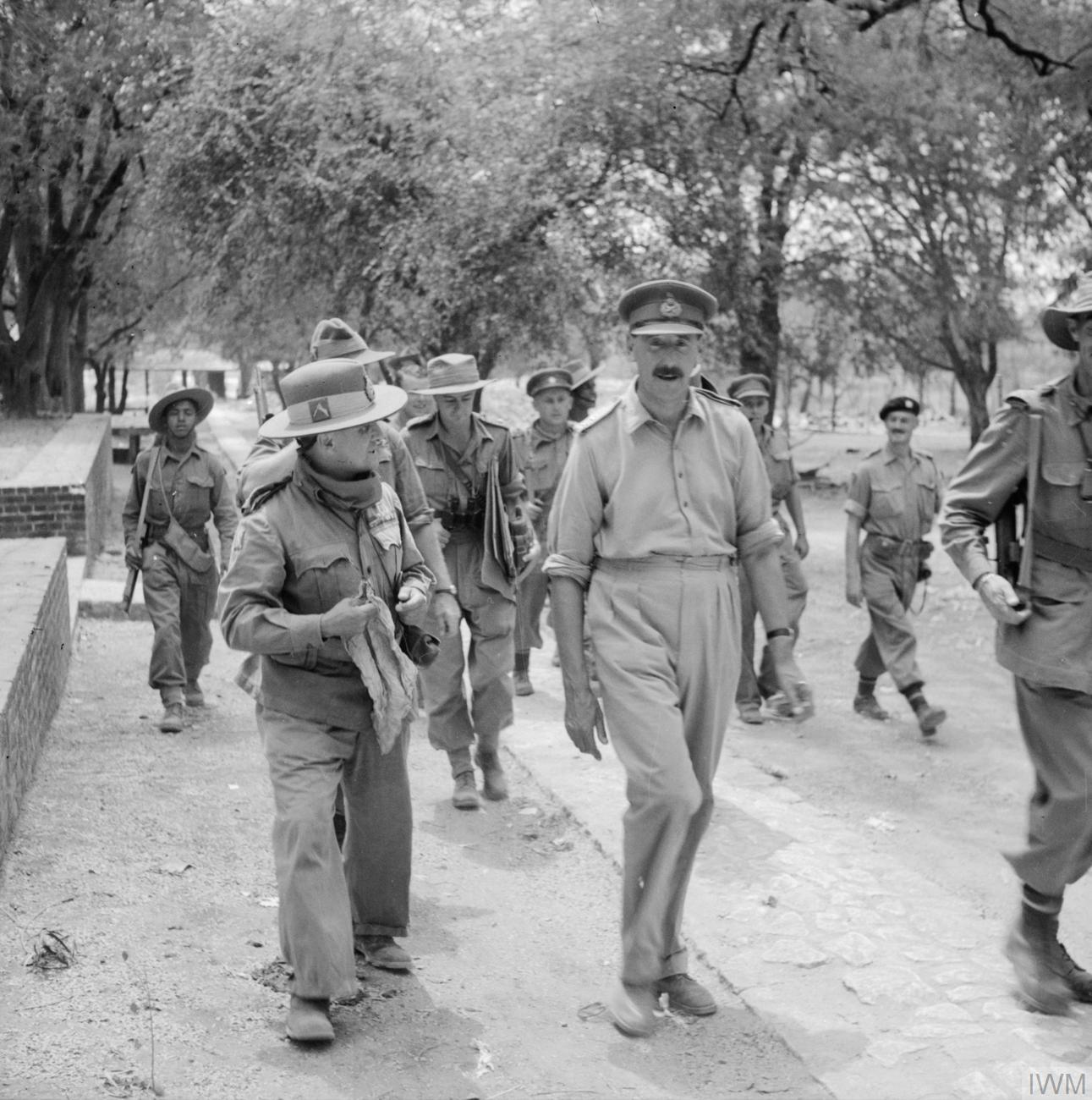
Leese (right) talks with Thomas Rees, GOC 19th Indian Infantry Division, Mandalay, 19 March 1945

Leese believed that Slim was very tired, considering his years of service fighting in Burma and having asked for leave once Rangoon had been taken, and proposed that he should be replaced by Lieutenant General Philip Christison. The latter was selected as the potential replacement to Slim, due to his experience in amphibious warfare that would be well suited for the next ALFSEA offensive that included a seaborne landing to recapture British Malaya. As a result, Leese chose Slim to command the new Twelfth Army, to deal with the less demanding task of mopping up remnant Japanese forces in Burma. Leese misread the situation and believed Slim was in agreement with these decisions. Slim reacted by telling his staff he had been sacked and wrote to Leese and General Sir Claude Auchinleck, the Commander-in-Chief India, to say he would refuse the new post and resign from the army in protest. Once the news circulated, there was mass-opposition within the Fourteenth Army. Without support from his superiors, Leese was obliged to reinstate Slim. The political backlash resulted in Leese being removed from command and replaced by Slim.

== Post-war ==
Richard Mead, in Churchill's Lions, argued that Leese was naive in his decision, Slim petulant, and Mountbatten (Leese's superior) devious due to switching positions from supporting to opposing Leese. Leese's career suffered and he returned to the UK to be GOC-in-C Eastern Command, a significant downward move from having been one of only three army group commanders in the British Army. His promotion to full general is believed to have been blocked by Mountbatten and Leese retired from the army in January 1947.

Leese became a noted horticulturist, writing books on cacti and keeping a well noted garden at his house, Lower Hall in Worfield, Shropshire. Although a keen cricketer, he had only modest success as a batsman in the 1914 Eton XI and was relegated to 12th man for that year's Eton v Harrow match, but was President of the Marylebone Cricket Club in 1965. He served as High Sheriff of Shropshire in 1958.

On 10 April 1960, Leese appeared a contestant on the American game show What's My Line?. Following the amputation of his right leg in 1973, Leese, a widower for the final years of his life after his wife Margaret died in 1965, moved to Wales into a house called Dolwen at Llanrhaeadr-ym-Mochnant, near Oswestry. He died there after a heart attack on 22 January 1978, at the age of 83, and was buried at Worfield parish church.

== Bibliography ==
- Keegan, John (2005) [1991]. Churchill's Generals. London: Cassell Military. pp. 214–224. ISBN 0-304-36712-5.
- Mead, Richard (2007). Churchill's Lions: a biographical guide to the key British generals of World War II. Stroud (UK): Spellmount. ISBN 978-1-86227-431-0.
- Mead, Richard (2015). The Men Behind Monty. Barnsley, Yorkshire: Pen and Sword. ISBN 978-1-47382-716-5. OCLC 922926980.
- Montgomery of Alamein, Bernard, 1st Viscount (1982) [1958]. The memoirs of Field-Marshal the Viscount Montgomery of Alamein, K.G. New York: Da Capo Press. ISBN 978-0-306-80173-0.
- Ryder, Rowland (1987). Oliver Leese. Hamish Hamilton. ISBN 0-241-12024-1.
- Smart, Nick (2005). Biographical Dictionary of British Generals of the Second World War. Barnesley: Pen & Sword. ISBN 1844150496.

Military offices
Preceded by Edwin Morris	GOC West Sussex County Division; 1940–1941	Post disbanded
Preceded by Robert Money	GOC 15th (Scottish) Infantry Division; January–June 1941	Succeeded by Philip Christison
New command	GOC Guards Armoured Division; 1941–1942	Succeeded by Sir Allan Adair
Preceded by William Ramsden	GOC XXX Corps; 1942–1943	Succeeded by Gerard Bucknall
Preceded by Sir Bernard Montgomery	GOC-in-C Eighth Army; 1943–1944	Succeeded by Sir Richard McCreery
Preceded by Sir George Giffard	GOC-in-C Allied Land Forces South East Asia; 1944–1945	Post disbanded
Preceded by Sir Alan Cunningham	GOC-in-C Eastern Command; 1945–1947	Succeeded by Sir Evelyn Barker
Baronetage of the United Kingdom
Preceded by William Hargreaves Leese	Baronet (of Send Holme); 1937–1978	Succeeded by Alexander William Leese
