= 21st Infantry Division (France) =

- French: 21e Division d'Infanterie
- Active: 1914 - 1940
- Country: France
- Branch: French Army
- Type: Infantry
- Engagements: World War I: Battle of the Ardennes; First Battle of the Marne; Second Battle of the Aisne; Second Battle of Champagne; Third Battle of the Aisne; Nivelle Offensive; Meuse-Argonne Offensive; World War II: Battle of Belgium; Battle of France

The 21st Infantry Division (French: 21e Division d'Infanterie, 21e DI) was a French Army formation during World War I and World War II.

== World War 1 ==
During World War I, the division was composed of the 64th, 93rd and 137th Infantry Regiments, the 97th Territorial Infantry Regiment, and the 65th Infantry Regiment (until November 1917). It was originally part of the French 11th Corps (CA).

The division fought in the Battle of the Ardennes, the Meuse, First Marne, First Aisne, Second Battle of Champagne, Verdun, Second and Third Aisne and the Meuse-Argonne Offensive. It was involved in some of the worst fighting at Verdun in June 1916, with officers reporting several units had formulated protests at being sent back into the battle. Following the disastrous opening of the Nivelle Offensive in April 1917, on 3 May the division refused orders to advance; two days later, after the ringleaders had been removed, it went into the line and suffered severe casualties, sparking the unrest that led to the French Army Mutinies.

At various times, it was part of the French Second Army, French Third Army, French Fourth Army, French Fifth Army, French Sixth Army, French Seventh Army, French Ninth Army and French Tenth Army.

== World War 2 ==
During the Battle of France in May 1940, the division contained the following units:

- 48th Infantry Regiment
- 65th Infantry Regiment
- 137th Infantry Regiment
- 27th Reconnaissance Battalion
- 35th Artillery Regiment
- 255th Artillery Regiment

The division was an active division which had existed during peacetime.

== Sources ==
- Horne, Alistair (1981) [1964]. The Price of Glory: Verdun 1916 (Abridged ed.). Penguin. ISBN 978-0-14-002215-5.
