= Draven (band) =

English rock band

- Origin: Guildford, Surrey, UK
- Genres: Classic Rock
- Years active: 2004–present
- Label: Cargo Records / CNR Records
- Members: Jim Paoli; Frank Paoli; Alex de la Fuente; Danny Wood
- Website: Official website

Draven are an English rock band from Guildford. Their debut album, Eden, was released in 2008 by Cargo Records and was produced by Kevin Shirley. Eden is a concept album based around the themes of the epic poem Paradise Lost by John Milton. The albums' lead single "Blitz" won a "Future Classic Track" award from Rock Radio and was named "Track of the Day" by Classic Rock Magazine.

== Discography ==
=== Albums ===
Date of Release	Title	Producer	Label
25 May 2008	Eden	Kevin Shirley	Cargo Records

=== Singles ===
Date of Release	Title	Label
1 January 2008	"Blitz"	Cargo Records
1 January 2008	"You Won't Take Me Down Again"	Cargo Records
1 January 2008	"Breathe"	Cargo Records

== Videography ==
- Itchy Finger (2007)
- Blitz (2011)

== Tours and festivals ==
- Philippines Tour 2005
- Guilfest: 2003 (Stage 3), 2009 (Rocksound Cave Stage), 2010 (Main Stage), 2011 (Main Stage)
- Freakfest 2003, 2004, 2005 2009
- Ripley Rocks: 2010 (Headline), 2011 (Headline)
