= Joseph Leese =

British politician, judge, and cricketer

Sir Joseph Francis Leese Bt KC

Member of Parliament for Accrington
- In office 4 July 1892 – 15 January 1910
- Preceded by: Robert Hermon-Hodge
- Succeeded by: Harold Baker

Personal details
- Born: 28 February 1845 Manchester, England
- Died: 29 July 1914 (aged 69) Sutton Park, Guildford, Surrey
- Party: Liberal
- Education: Regent's Park College, London University

Sir Joseph Francis Leese, 1st Baronet, KC (28 February 1845 – 29 July 1914) was a British judge, Liberal politician and first-class cricketer.

== Background ==
The second of eight children, Joseph was born in February 1845 to Joseph Leese (1815–1906), of Altrincham, Greater Manchester, a cotton spinner who had founded the firm of Messrs. Kershaw, Sidebotham & Co, and his wife Frances Susan Scurr (1819-1890). He was educated at Regent's Park College and gained a Bachelor of Arts from London University in 1863. He briefly attended the Gonville & Caius College at the University of Cambridge in 1864.

In 1867, Leese married Mary Constance Hargreaves. They had six sons and two daughters, including first-class cricketer and barrister William Leese. Leese's younger sister married the Town Clerk of Southport, John Davies Williams. Williams was the uncle of Welsh priest John Rhys Davies.

== Legal career ==
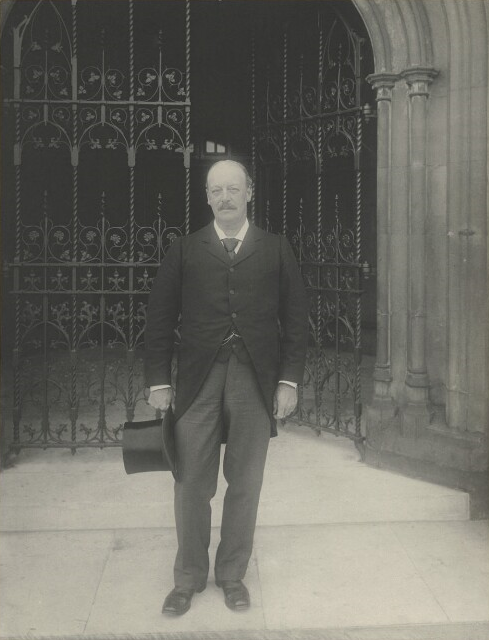
Leese outside the Palace of Westminster in 1898.

Leese qualified as a barrister and was admitted to the Inner Temple in 1868. During his early career he was heavily involved in nonconformist campaigning for religious education reform, serving as a member of the United Nonconformist Committee, (frequently chairing meetings across England), and the National Education League. Both groups called for amendments and reform of the Endowed Schools Act 1869 and the Elementary Education Act in 1870. He was also known to have attended meetings in support of disestablishment of the Church of England. He served as secretary, and later president, of the Manchester Nonconformist Association from its formation in 1871. Leese stood as a candidate for the first Manchester School Board, but withdrew on account of the large number of Liberals standing. Leese was a member of the Manchester Athenaeum.

Leese was a vocal supporter of the unsuccessful Liberal candidate George William Latham in 1873 and 1880, later supporting fellow nonconformist Jacob Bright in his successful re-election bid for Manchester in 1876.

He was invested as a Queen's Counsel in 1891. He was appointed Recorder of Manchester in 1893, and became a Bencher at the Inner Temple in 1898.

== Political career ==
Leese first stood as a Liberal candidate for Preston in 1868;

General election 1868: Preston (2 seats)
Party	Candidate	Votes	%	±%
Conservative	Edward Hermon	5,803		
Conservative	Sir Thomas G Hesketh	5,700		
Liberal	Joseph Francis Leese	4,741		
Liberal	Lord E. G. F. Howard	4,663		

He stood again, this time for Accrington in 1886, coming second. He was eventually elected at the 1892 General Election, gaining the seat from the Conservatives. During his time in office, Leese served on the committee for the Irish Land Acts, and was often involved in agricultural and educational affairs, particularly the Education Act 1902. He announced he would retire in early 1903, but decided to stay through the next election, which was held in 1906. He voted in favour of the 1908 Women's Enfranchisement Bill. He retired from parliament at the January 1910 General Election.

== Cricket career ==
He played first-class cricket for Lancashire County Cricket Club from 1865 to 1881. He played 25 first-class matches as a batsman but only averaged 13 runs per innings. He occasionally bowled, taking 5 wickets in his career at an average of 19.

== Later life ==
Leese was knighted in the 1895 Birthday Honours and was created a baronet on 15 July 1908. Following his retirement he continued in his role as Recorder of Manchester, however he suffered with ill health throughout 1913, and he retired from the role in January 1914. He died at Sutton Park, Guildford, Surrey in July that year, aged 69, and was buried in St. Mary's Churchyard, Send, on 1 August. On his death, his baronetcy passed to his son, William, but eventually became dormant following the passing of Joseph's great-grandson, Alexander William Leese, in 1979.

Parliament of the United Kingdom
Preceded by Robert Hermon-Hodge	Member of Parliament for Accrington; 1892–January 1910	Succeeded by Harold Baker
Baronetage of the United Kingdom
New creation	Baronet (of Send Holme); 1908–1914	Succeeded by William Lease
