= Ernest Leese =

English cricketer

Ernest Leese (30 November 1854 – 15 November 1913) was an English cricketer active from 1880 to 1884 who played for Lancashire. He was born in Bowdon, Cheshire and died in Southport. He appeared in eight first-class matches as a righthanded batsman, scoring 146 runs with a highest score of 62 and held two catches.
