= St John's Church, Watford =

Church in Hertfordshire, England

Coordinates: 51°39′31″N 0°23′38″W

St John the Apostle & Evangelist, Watford
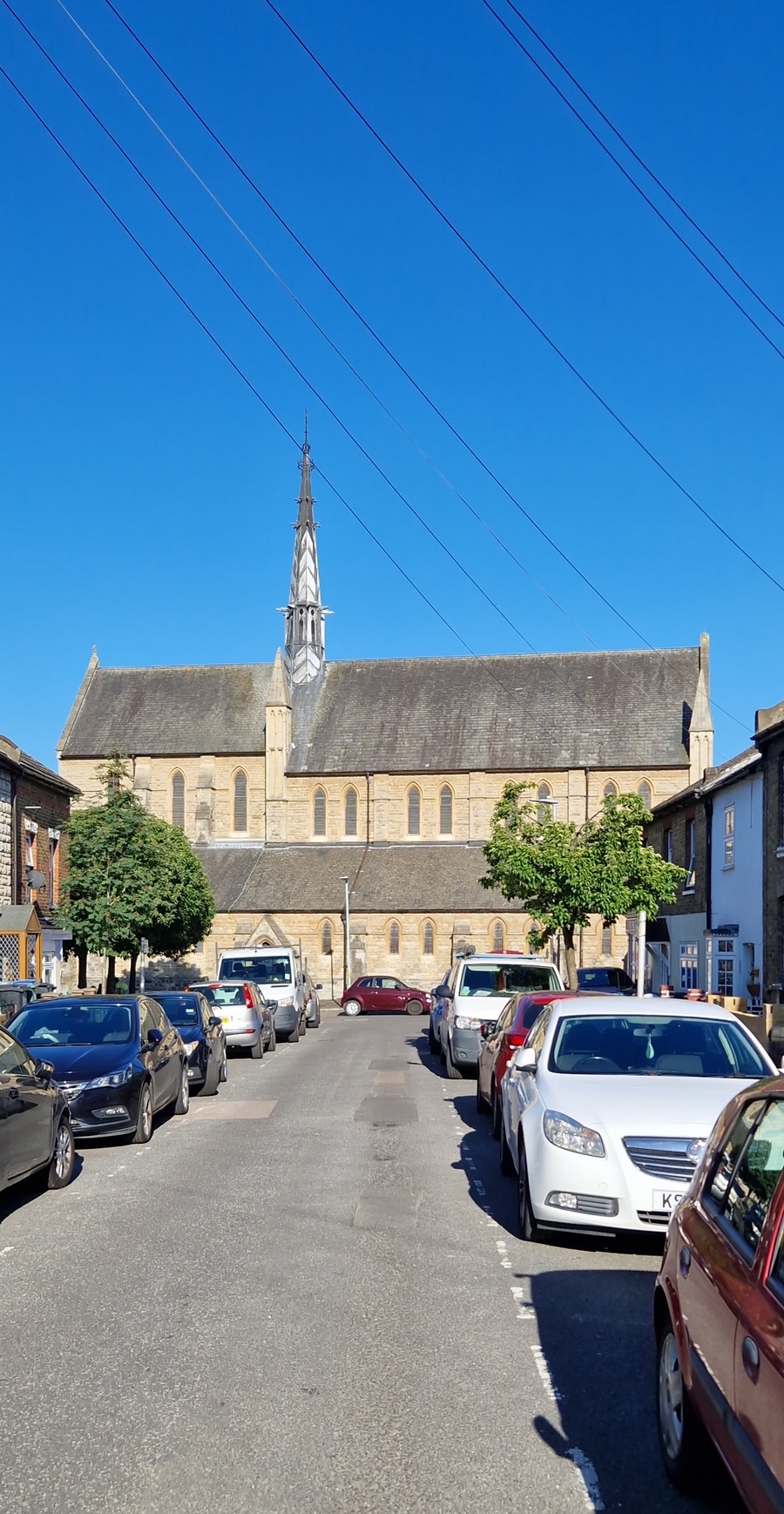
- St John's Church, Watford
- St John the Apostle & Evangelist, Watford
- Denomination: Church of England
- Churchmanship: Anglo-Catholic
- Website: www.saintjohnswatford.org.uk

History
- Dedication: St John the Apostle

Administration
- Province: Canterbury
- Diocese: St Albans
- Archdeaconry: St Albans
- Deanery: Watford
- Parish: St John the Apostle & Evangelist

Clergy
- Vicar: Fr Corniel Quak

The Church of St John the Apostle and Evangelist is a Church of England parish church located in Sutton Road, close to the centre of the busy market town of Watford in Hertfordshire. It is within the Diocese of St Albans and has throughout its history been one of the leading Anglo-Catholic churches in the southeast of England.

Today the church stands in the Modern Catholic tradition, retaining features characteristic of Anglo-Catholic worship, whilst celebrating the ministry of both women and men, rejoicing that the Church of England ordains people regardless of their gender to be Deacons, Priests and Bishops.

== History ==
St John's Church, Watford, dates back to 1873. The ancient parish church of St Mary's was extensively restored in 1871, and during this time a temporary tin church was erected in the churchyard. With St Mary's re-opened, the tin church was re-erected on some donated ground in Sotheron Road (now Sutton Road). On 23 November 1873 St John's Church began.

The temporary building, with seating for 450, attracted a growing number of people, and was considered very 'High Church' for its day - many of the things that we associate with catholic worship were yet to come, however. The roof of the Tin Church was unfortunately not waterproof, and it was quickly apparent inside when it was raining outside! The idea of a permanent building was raised, and there followed a period of great activity to raise the necessary money. Many people were most generous - more land was given, plans were drawn up and approved and eventually the foundation stone was laid on 17 July 1891. Two years and two days later, on 19 July 1893, John Wogan Festing, Lord Bishop of St Albans, dedicated the fine building. It cost £11,000 to build - a huge sum in those days. In May 1904 St John's became a parish church in its own right.

The Church was designed by the architect Eley Emlyn White. It has been a Grade II Listed Building since 1983.

Restoration work has been undertaken in the latter half of the twentieth century. The chancel and sanctuary were restored/cleaned in 1961. The nave and aisles were cleaned and redecorated in memory of the first vicar Canon James who died in 1966. Outside stonework was restored/cleaned in 1973 for the church's centenary.

== Images ==
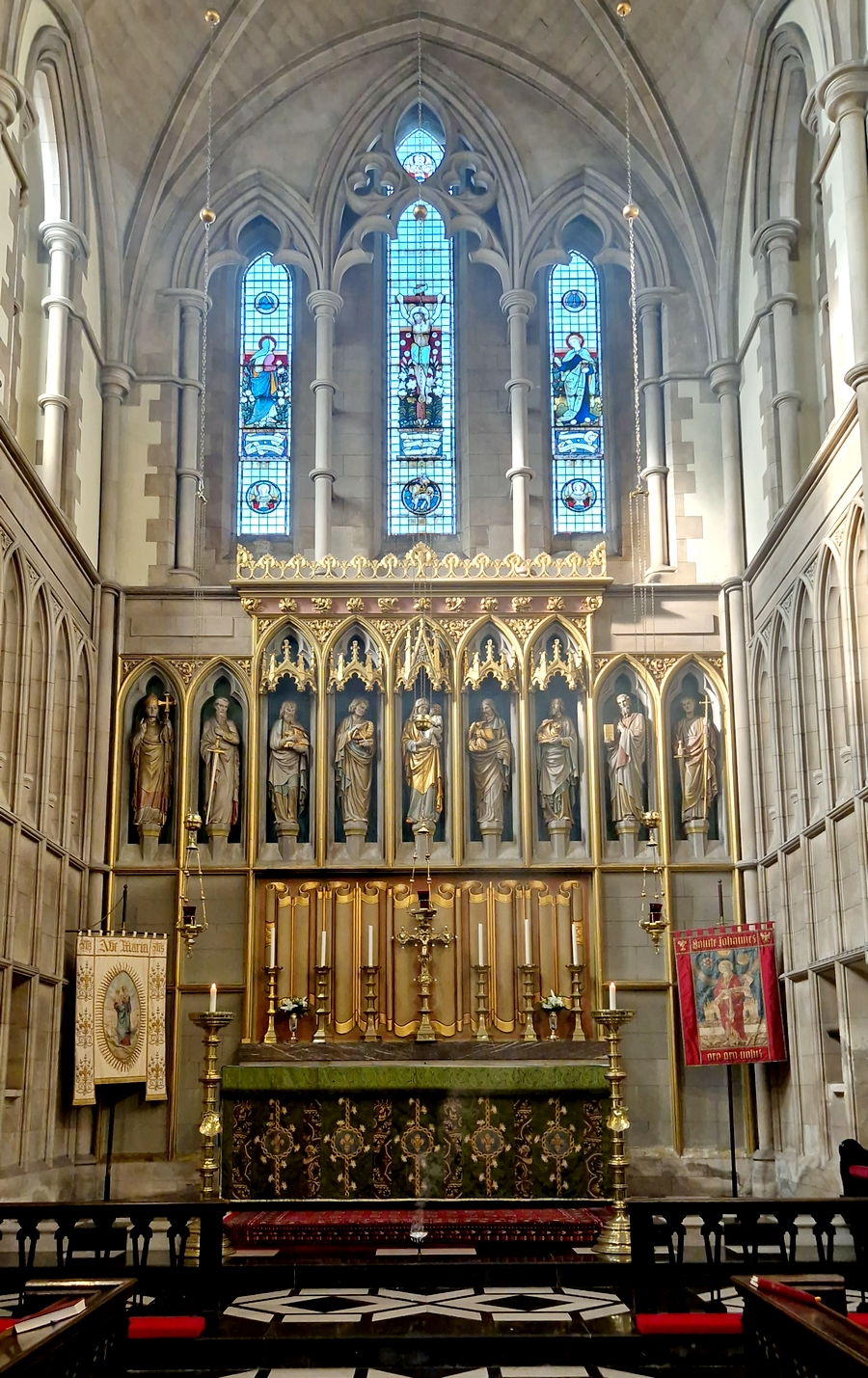

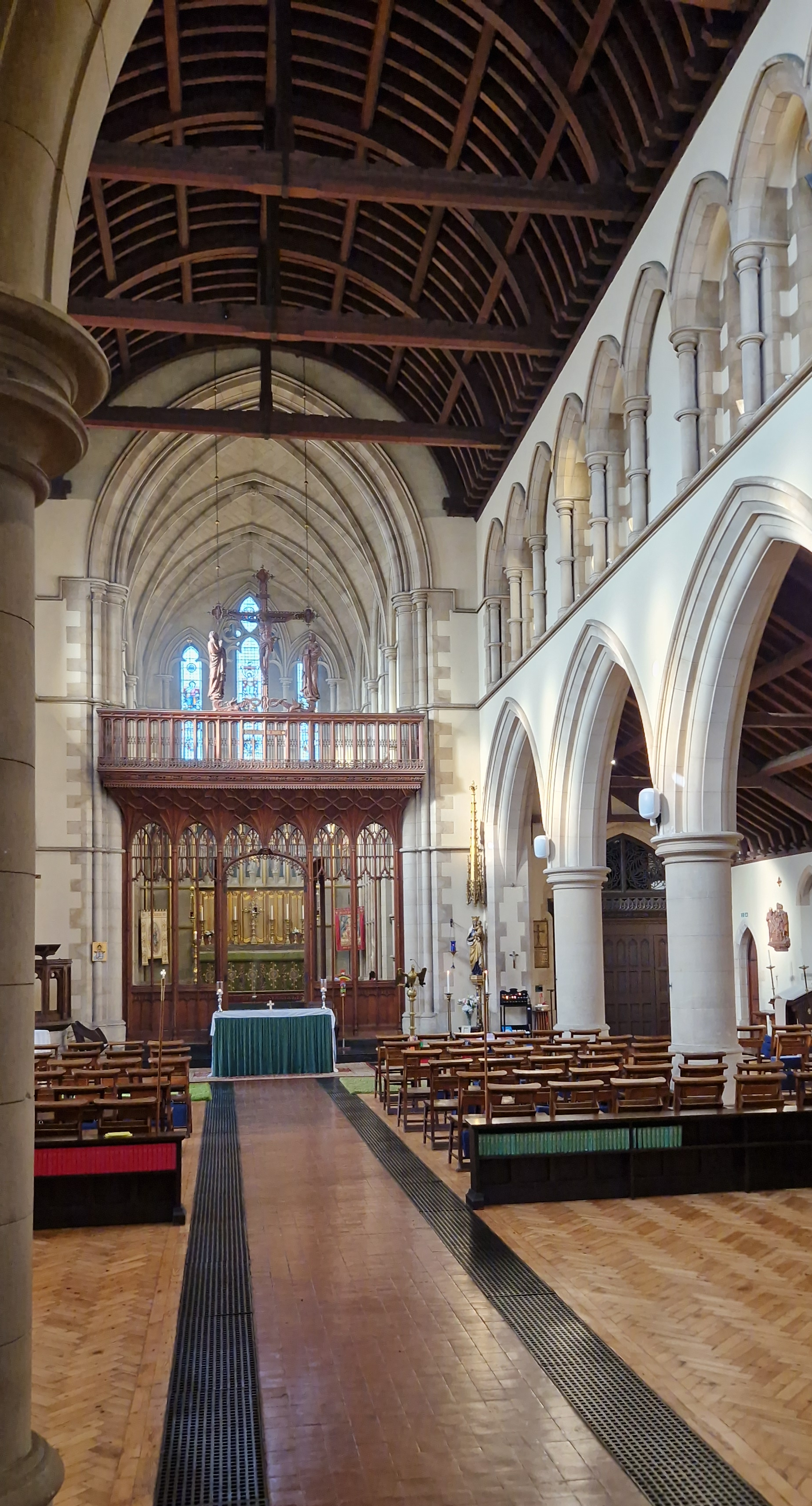

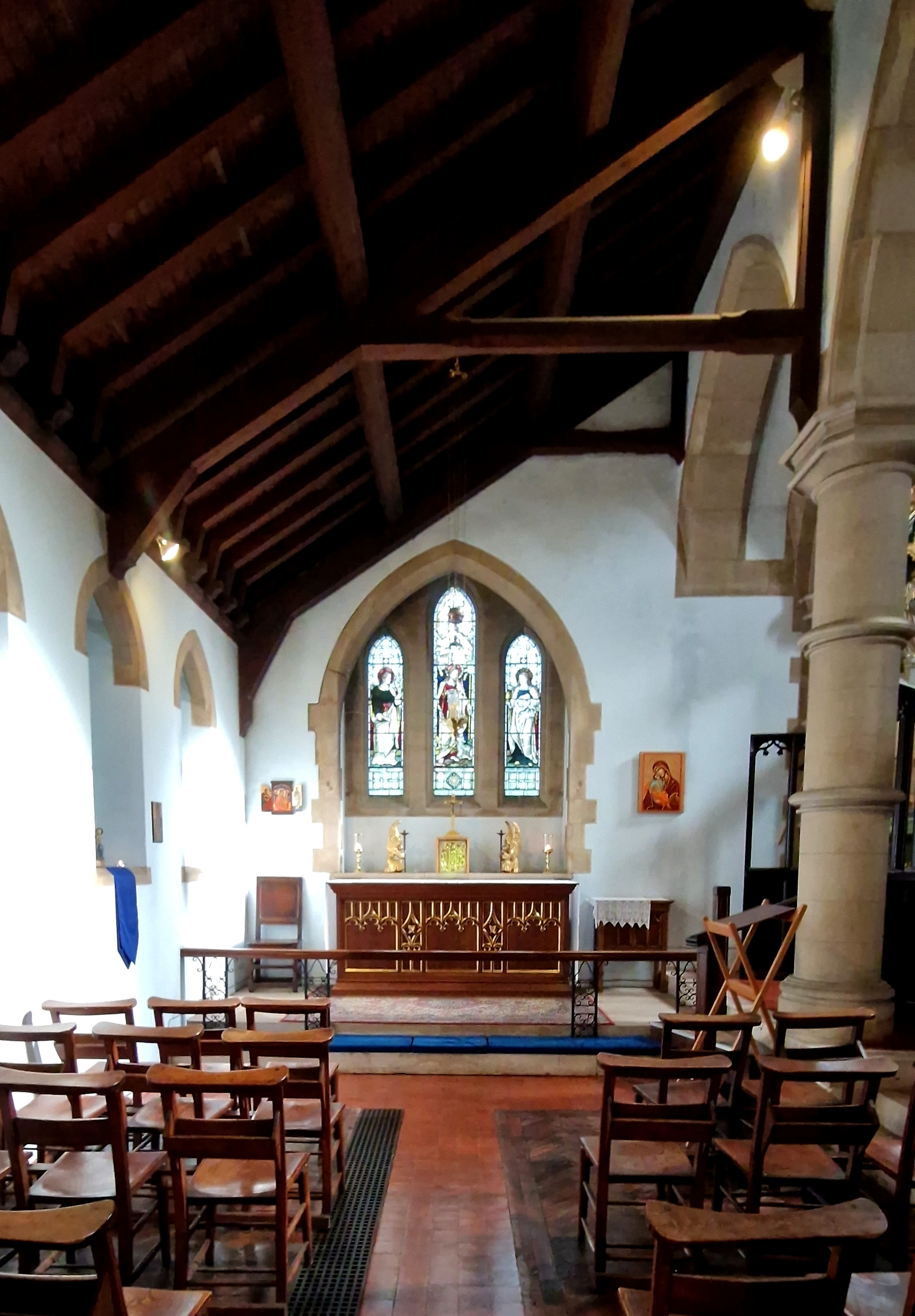

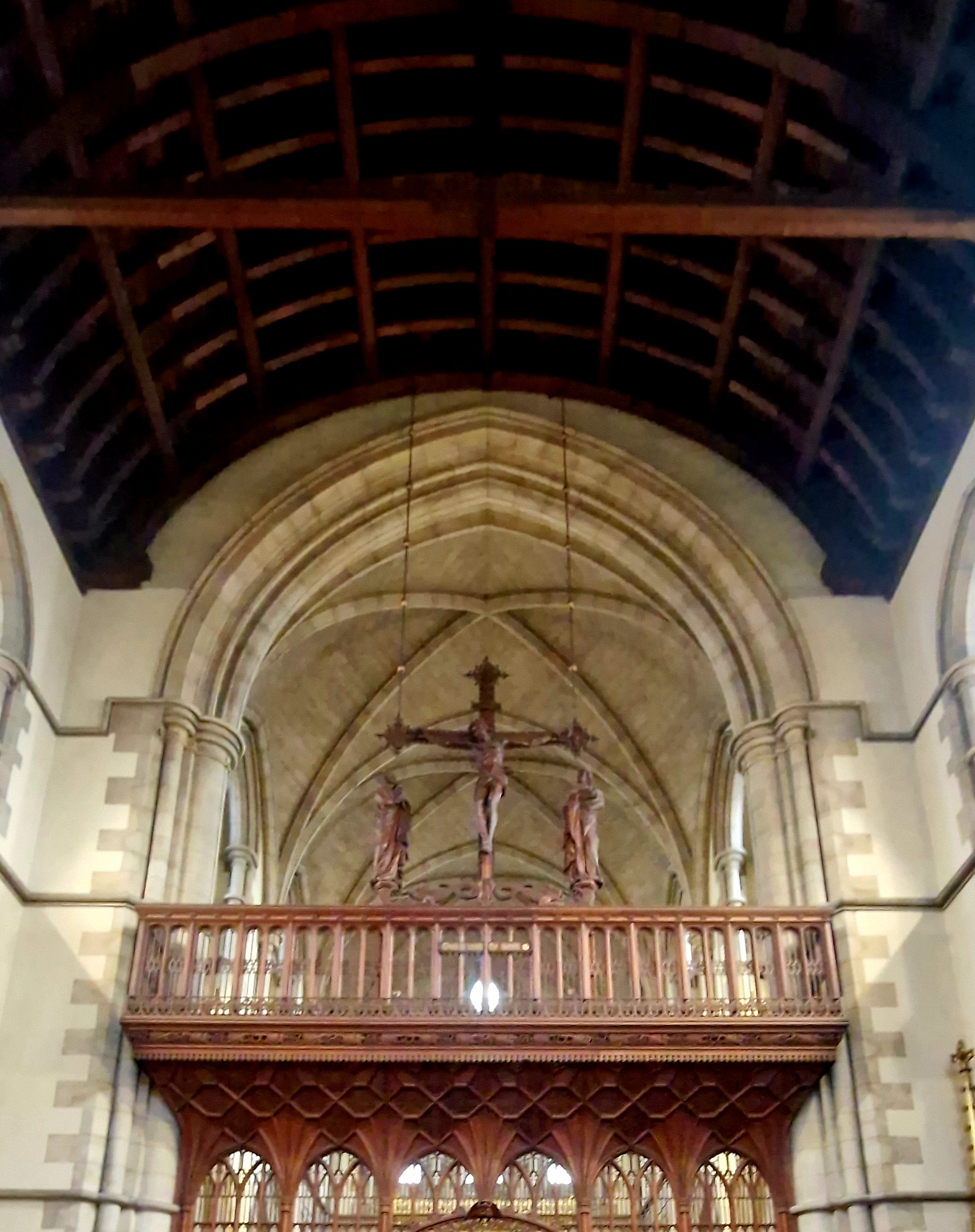

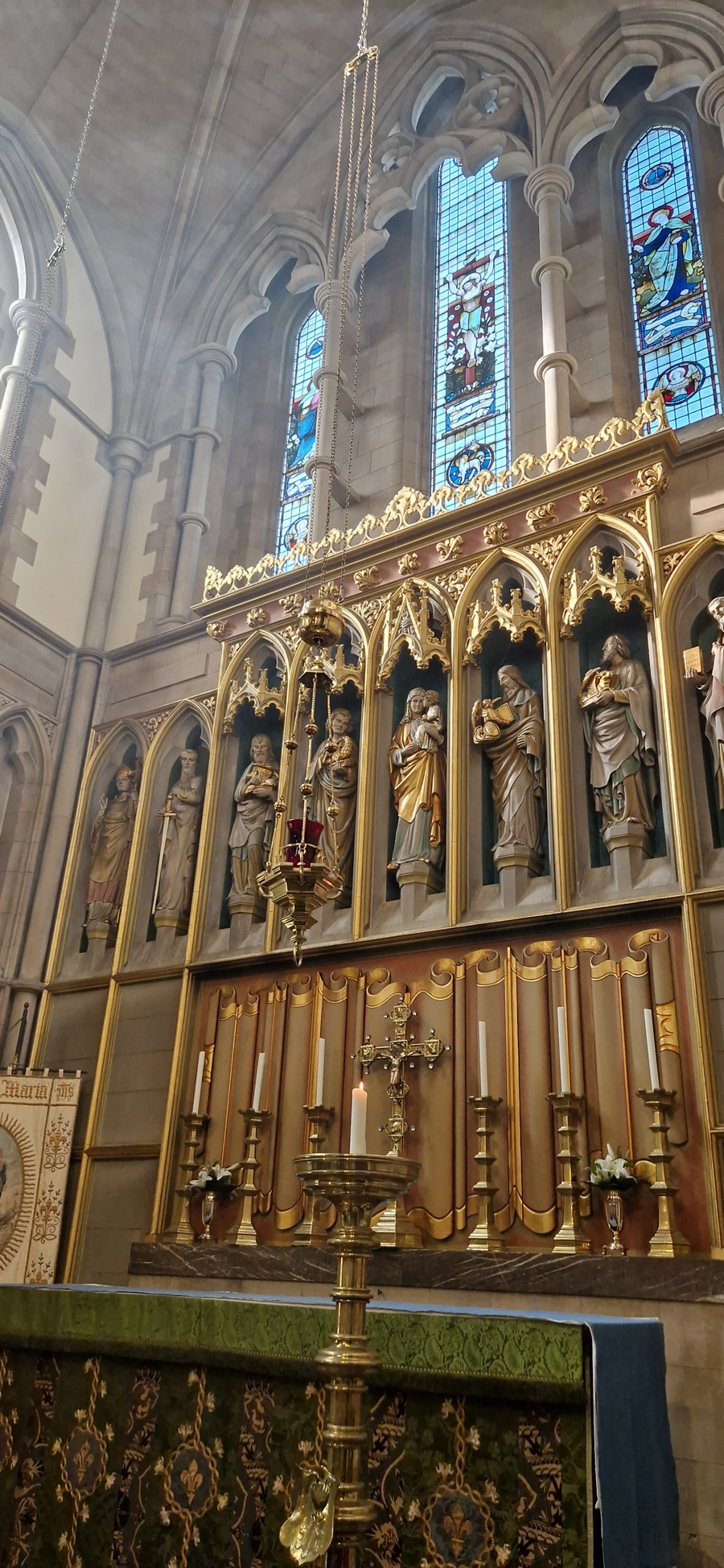

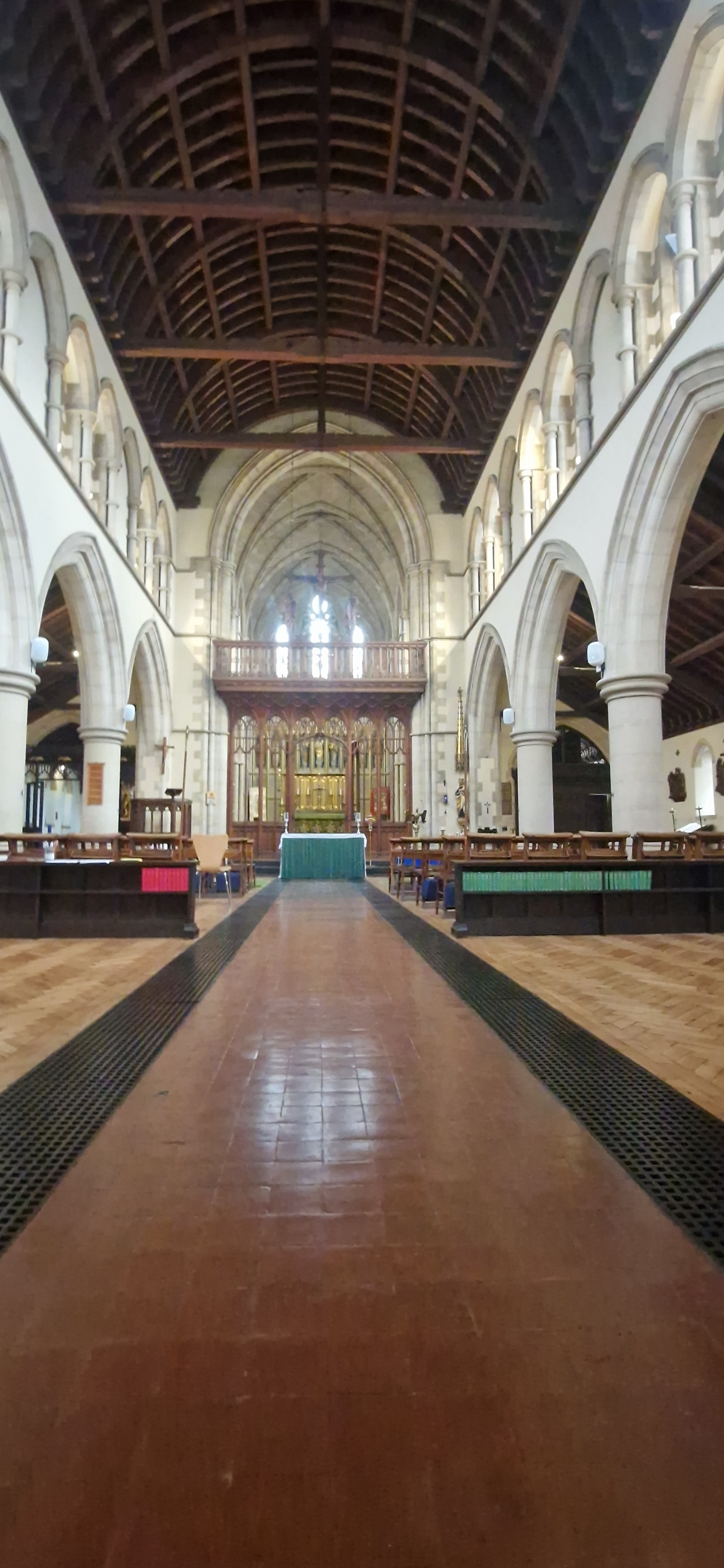

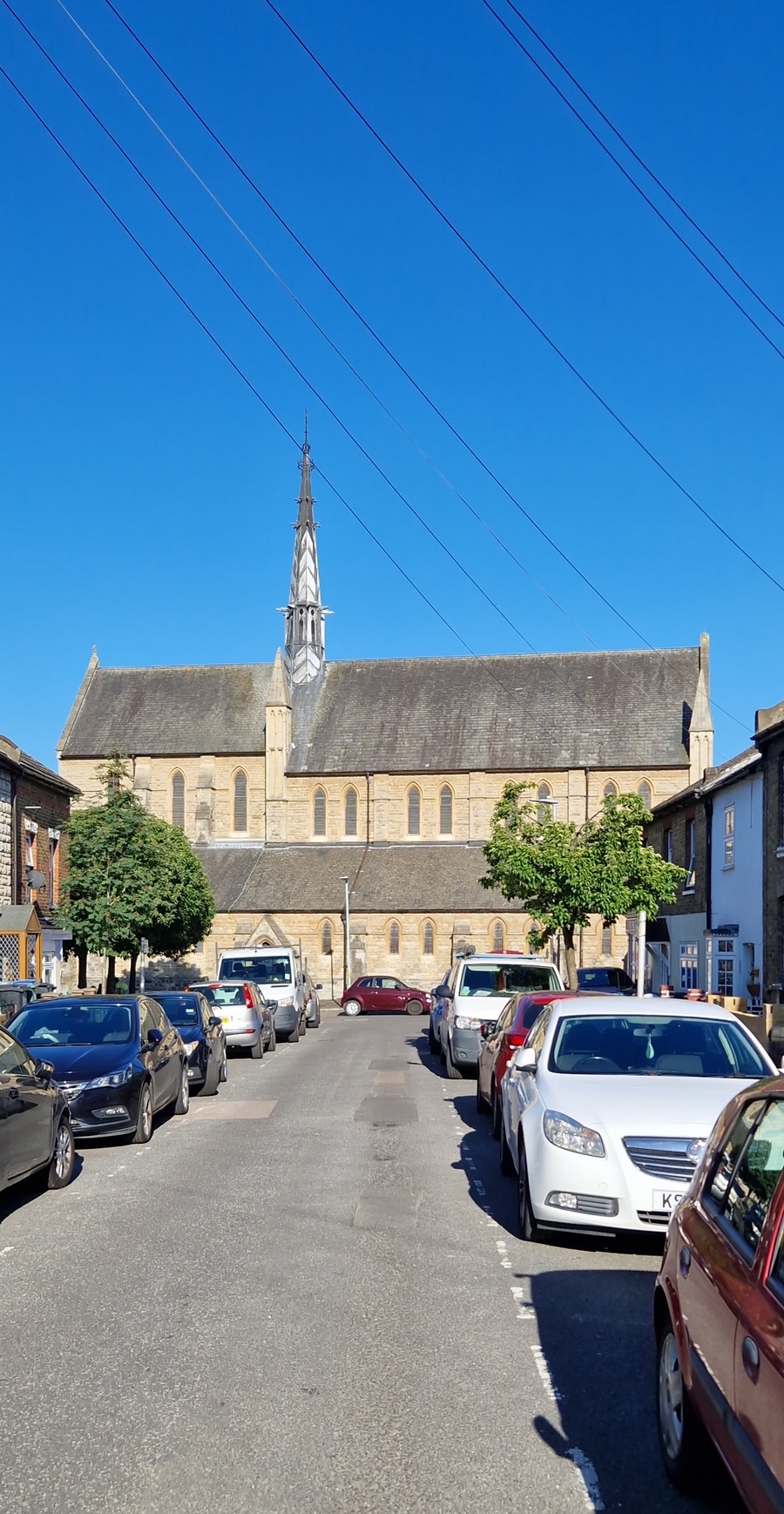

St John's has a pipe organ built in 1911 by the London firm of J. W. Walker & Sons Ltd. The rood screen was designed by Sir John Ninian Comper (1864–1960). Many other gifts of fine plate silver, vestments, copes, Stations of the Cross, crib figures, statue of The Madonna, glass, and woodwork have been received over the years.

== Regular events and services ==
Services

- Parish Eucharist (Sunday, 10:30)
- Morning Prayer (Monday, 8:00)
- Said Mass with Lectio Divina (Wednesday, 10:00)
- Said Mass, Exposition and Benediction (2nd Thursday, 19:00)

== St John's Primary School ==
St John’s Church of England Primary School is located close to St John's church in central Watford. It has a distinct religious designation and a Christian ethos permeates throughout the whole school. It is an inclusive school that welcomes families from a Christian background, all faiths and those of no faith, and like St John's church is committed to serving the whole of the community.

The idea for St John's school started in 2013 when the then vicar, Rev David Stevenson, listened to local families within the parish who were requesting a Church of England school and a greater choice for local school provision. After much planning, in 2016 a Funding Agreement with the Secretary of State was made and in September that year a founding class of 30 reception children started at the Church Hall in Estcourt Road.

On 3rd September 2018, the school moved into its newly built home at 32 Clarendon Road. It has an intake of 60 children every year, providing education for up to 420 children in total from the nearby community each year.

The school's mission statement is "Growing Together in Love and Respect".

In June 2024, Fr Corniel as the new vicar of the parish of St John’s, also took on an official role as School Chaplain, working closely with the school to enable each child and staff member to flourish and offer pastoral support.

In September 2024, the school joined the Poppy Academy Trust which will enable it to link with like-minded practitioners and provide new opportunities for children and staff.

== Vicars ==
- The Rev. J.H. White – 1873-1898
- The Rt. Rev. John M. Steward - 1898-1904
- The Rev. Canon R.H.L. James -1904-1954
- The Rev. Stanley J. Forrest - 1954-1961
- The Rev. R. Salter - 1962-1998
- The Rev. J. Cope - 1999-2007
- The Rev. E. Lewis - 2008-2010
- The Rev. D.E. Stevenson - 2011–2023
- The Rev C. Quak (2024-present)
