= Longmore =

Longmore may refer to:

== People ==
- Andrew Longmore (b. 1944), British lawyer and judge
- Andrew Longmore (journalist) (1953–2019), English cricketer and journalist
- Arthur Longmore (1885–1970), early British naval aviator and later a senior Royal Air Force officer
- Michael Longmore (b. 1979), English cricketer
- Paul K. Longmore (1946–2010), American college professor, author, and disability activist
- Roy Longmore (1894–2001), Australian centenarian and World War I veteran, and one of the last two living veterans of the Australia and New Zealand Army Corps
- Saphire Longmore (born 1976), Jamaican politician and former model

== Other ==
- 77P/Longmore, a comet
- Longmore House, a hospital in Scotland
