= Ralph Banks =

Ralph Banks or Bankes may refer to:

- Ralph Banks (footballer) (1920–1993), English footballer
- Ralph Richard Banks (born 1964), American professor
- Ralph Bankes (1631–1677), courtier of Charles II and MP for Corfe Castle
- Ralph Bankes (landowner) (1902–1981), British landowner
- Ralph George Scott Bankes, British barrister
