= George Rudolf Hanbury Fielding =

British Army officer (1915–2005)

DSO George Rudolf Hanbury Fielding
- Born: 3 July 1915; Twyford, Hampshire, England
- Died: 25 January 2005 (aged 89)
- Education: University of Freiburg
- Military career
- Allegiance: United Kingdom
- Rank: Major
- Commands: Special Operations Executive
- Conflicts: Second World War

George (Rudolf Hanbury) Fielding DSO (3 July 1915 – 23 January 2005) was a Major in the Special Operations Executive (SOE) during the Second World War.

== Early life ==
Through his great, great, great-grandfather, Henry Fielding, the Novelist and Chief Magistrate of Westminster, George Fielding was a scion, through patrilineal descent, of the Earls of Denbigh and Desmond.

Fielding was born in Twyford, Hampshire, three weeks before his father, Major George Hanbury Fielding of the Sherwood Foresters, was killed at Gallipoli. His mother, Evelyn Carlota (née Jewell), took him to live in Château d'Oex in Switzerland; she returned to England in 1939. Fielding was educated at Twyford School, Shrewsbury School and later at Freiburg University where he studied the German that was invaluable to his later military career.

During the late 1930s he worked as a trapper on the Canadian Arctic Circle and then moved to the Argentine, first as assistant to a farm manager on an estancia and later as a cattle-buyer in Rosario for Swifts of Chicago. In 1938, anticipating the outbreak of the Second World War, Fielding returned to England, and was commissioned into the 3rd The King's Own Hussars. His squadron was posted to fight in the Battle of Crete, where he was wounded in the arm and then charged with marching his fellow walking-wounded overland to the coast for evacuation by the Royal Navy. He was mentioned in dispatches. He then served with 3rd Hussars in the North African campaign during which he answered the call for volunteers to join the Special Operations Executive.

== Austrian SOE mission, August 1944 ==
In August 1944, with German forces retreating to the Gothic Line on the Italian mainland, Fielding was tasked to lead a three-strong SOE group into Austria's East Tyrol and Carinthia, to help and encourage sabotage on German communication lines. The group was parachuted 200 miles (322 km) behind enemy lines near Tramonti in North Eastern Italy on 12–13 August, hoping to gain support from Italian partisans. Although the communist Garibaldi partisans showed reluctance, the Osoppo partisans at Forni Avoltri, 15 miles (24 km) south of Austria, were willing to help and to hide them. He sent one of his group to reconnoitre within Carinthia but the report back showed that there was little willingness to take up resistance through fear of Gestapo reprisal. Despite lacking identity papers, Fielding decided to reconnoitre the upper Gail Valley and Carinthia personally and came to the same conclusion. The Germans had learned of the presence of Fielding, and other SOE groups, and offered a reward for his capture. To keep the support of the partisans, he promised supply of arms and provisions by air, a promise that was impossible to keep through lack of suitable dropping zones. This air support, with promised supply drops, was aborted at the last minute, leading Fielding in his frustration to send an angry message to the Bari-based Balkan Air Force asking them to show more of the "spirit of the Battle of Britain and less of the Bottle of Bari".

The lack of success of the mission led to an order to evacuate from Italy and to be picked up in Slovenia, a march of 300 miles (483 km). The group, which by then had been augmented by remnants from other SOE operations, was betrayed and ambushed but escaped to Slovenia with loss of mules and equipment and a wounded arm for Fielding. Valuable information had been gathered by Fielding's mission and 6,000 German troops had been diverted to capture him. For this, in 1945 he was awarded the DSO for courage, resourcefulness, and outstanding leadership.

== Later life ==
After the war, Fielding took to farming in the west of Ireland for nine years. He returned to Château d'Oex, where he had lived as a boy with his mother, taking up painting and running a sporting travel agency. In 2005, he died there. He married Beatrice Georgina Pope in 1940 (d. 1997) and was survived by their son, Martin George Rudolf (b. 2 December 1945) captain, The Queen's Own Hussars, MRICS and their daughter, Sarah Georgina (b.10 May 1947), who married Lt.-Col. Hon. Guy Bainbridge Norrie, the son of Lt.-Gen. Charles Willoughby Moke Norrie, 1st Baron Norrie, and Patricia Merryweather Bainbridge
