= Twyford School =

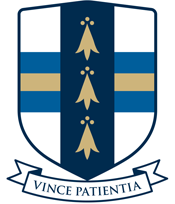

Location
- Twyford, Hampshire, SO21 1NW; England; 51°01′16″N 1°18′50″W

Information
- Type: Private preparatory day and boarding
- Motto: Vince Patientia
- Religious affiliation: Church of England
- Established: c. 17th century
- Local authority: Hampshire
- Department for Education URN: 116536 Tables
- Headmaster: Andrew Harvey
- Gender: Coeducational
- Age: 2 to 13
- Enrolment: 406~
- Former pupil: Old Twyfordians
- Website: twyfordschool.com

Twyford School is a co-educational, private preparatory boarding and day school, located in the village of Twyford, Hampshire, England.

== History ==
Twyford declares itself to be the oldest preparatory school in the United Kingdom. It moved to its present site in 1809, but there has been a school for boys in Twyford since the seventeenth century. During the nineteenth century buildings were added, including a large schoolroom built during the 1820s, and a mid-Victorian chapel. Original buildings are still used and form part of today's campus.

In 1859, while George Kitchin was master of the school, his friend Lewis Carroll took a photograph of Kitchin and his class of nine boys.

== Current status ==
A series of developments coincided with the admission of girls to the school, and have continued in recent years. Building works and improvements have been undertaken, although historic fabric has generally been retained. In addition the sports grounds and other outdoor facilities have been upgraded.

Twyford is a private school, and a registered charity. It accepts both day pupils and boarders, and has a pre-preparatory school on the same campus for children below the age of five. It has capacity for around 400 pupils between the ages of 3 and 13, with boarders being accepted from the age of 8. It is a Church of England school.

== Headmasters ==
- To 1692: Rev. Thomas Brown, alias Weatherby
- From 1692: Rev. William Husband, alias Bernard
- 1855 to 1861: Rev. George Kitchin, later Dean of Winchester in 1883, then Dean of Durham from 1894 to 1912, and from 1908 to 1912, Chancellor of the University of Durham
- 1862 to 1887: Reverend Lathom Wickham
- 1887: Reverend Charles Townshend Wickham
- 1939 to 1963: Reverend Robert ("Bob") G. Wickham
- 1963 to 1983: David. T. Wickham MA (Oxon)
- 1983 to 1996: Peter Richard Douglas Gould
- 1996 to 2003: Philip Fawkes
- 2003 to 2009: Dr David Livingstone
- 2009 to 2020: Dr Steve Bailey, previously a master at Winchester College
- 2020 Andrew Harvey

In 1984, Donald Leinster-Mackay noted that "The Wickham family have provided headmasters for Twyford School since 1834.

== Notable old boys ==
See also Category:People educated at Twyford School

- Alexander Pope (1688–1744), poet
- Thomas Talbot (1727–1795), Roman Catholic bishop
- James Talbot (1726–1790), priest
- William Loring (1811–1895), Royal Navy officer
- Thomas Hughes (1822–1896), lawyer and author
- Thomas Baring, 1st Earl of Northbrook (1826–1904)
- Philip Sclater (1829–1913), lawyer and zoologist
- Robert Biddulph (1835–1918), soldier
- Charles Eamer Kempe (1837–1907) designer of stained glass
- Wilfrid Scawen Blunt (1840–1922), poet
- Thomas Garnier (1841–1898), clergyman and cricketer
- Robert Moberly (1845–1915), priest
- Edwin Dodgson (1846–1918), clergyman and missionary, brother of Charles Lutwidge Dodgson (Lewis Carroll)
- Henry Hallam Parr (1847–1914), soldier
- Hubert Parry (1848–1918), composer
- Arthur Woollgar Verrall (1851–1912), classical scholar
- George Kemball (1858–1941), soldier
- Edward Christian (1858–1934), footballer and tea-trader
- John Rawlinson (1860–1926), lawyer and politician
- Walter Congreve (1862–1927), soldier
- Arthur Christian (1863–1926), Royal Navy officer
- Edwyn Alexander-Sinclair (1865–1945), Royal Navy officer
- John Poynder Dickson-Poynder, 1st Baron Islington (1866–1936), Governor General of New Zealand
- Andrew Hamilton Russell (1868–1960), New Zealand soldier
- Walter Roch (1880–1965), landowner and politician
- John Minshull-Ford (1881–1948), soldier and Lieutenant Governor of Guernsey
- Roscow Shedden (1882–1956), bishop
- Clarence Napier Bruce, 3rd Baron Aberdare (1885–1957), sportsman
- George Gater (1886–1963), soldier and civil servant
- Roland Philipps (1890–1916), soldier, killed in action
- Alban Arnold (1892–1916), cricketer
- Ernest Fraser Jacob (1894–1971), scholar
- Gerald Vernon (1899–1963), bishop
- William Andrewes (1899–1974), Royal Navy officer
- Ralph George Scott Bankes (1900–1948), barrister
- Michael Perrin (1905–1988), nuclear physicist
- Richard Crossman (1907–1974), politician
- Amherst Barrow Whatman (1909–1984), radio engineer
- Claude Sclater (1910-1986), naval officer
- Lynch Maydon (1913–1971), naval officer and politician
- George Rudolf Hanbury Fielding (1915–2005), soldier
- Terence Edward Armstrong (1920–1996), arctic geographer
- Desmond Norman (1929–2002), aircraft designer
- Jock Bruce-Gardyne, (1930–1990), politician
- Douglas Hurd (born 1930), politician
- Mark Tully (1935–2026), BBC overseas correspondent
- Humphrey Taylor (born 1938), bishop
- Christopher Orlebar (1945–2018), Concorde pilot
- Ralph Palmer, 12th Baron Lucas (born 1951), publisher and politician
- Andrew Longmore (1953–2019), cricketer and journalist
