= Christopher Orlebar =

British Concorde pilot (1945–2018)

Christopher John Dugmore Orlebar (4 February 1945 – 24 February 2018) was a former British Concorde pilot with British Airways. He was well known as a lecturer, writer, and frequent contributor to TV aviation documentaries on aviation subjects generally, and on the Concorde in particular.

Orlebar, the son of Brigadier John Orlebar, was educated at Twyford School, Rugby School and Southampton University. He learned to fly in 1965 with the Southampton University Air Squadron (RAF), and then finished his training in civil aviation at the College of Air Training at Hamble. Orlebar joined BOAC (later British Airways) in 1969, and became a VC10 pilot, navigator and instructor. He became a Concorde pilot and instructor in 1976, flying the aircraft for 10 years. He went on to become a training Captain on the Boeing 737 from 1986 and retired from British Airways in 2000.

A liveryman of the Guild of Air Pilots and Air Navigators, and a Fellow of the Royal Aeronautical Society, Orlebar was in high demand as a lecturer and as a contributor to radio and TV programmes. Orlebar's expertise was called upon particularly following the crash of a Concorde in Paris in 2000. He was diagnosed with Parkinson's disease in 1998.

Orlebar's book The Concorde Story has been a bestseller since its publication in 1986. Now in its seventh edition, The Concorde Story has remained the most complete record of the history of Concorde in print since it was first published. Starting with Concorde's earliest development, it assesses other forms of supersonic transport and provides the background to Concorde's evolution. It reveals what it was like to fly Concorde, and the training procedures to which Concorde pilots are subjected. The latest edition (2011) brings the story up to date, with chapters on Concorde's final flight and decommissioning, advice on where to go to see Concorde at rest, and information on the Paris crash of 2000. He released a smaller book simply known as Concorde in February 2017.

He is descended from the Orlebars of Hinwick, Bedfordshire, and is survived by his wife, two adult children and three grandchildren.
