= HMS Wild Swan (D62) =

Destroyer of the Royal Navy

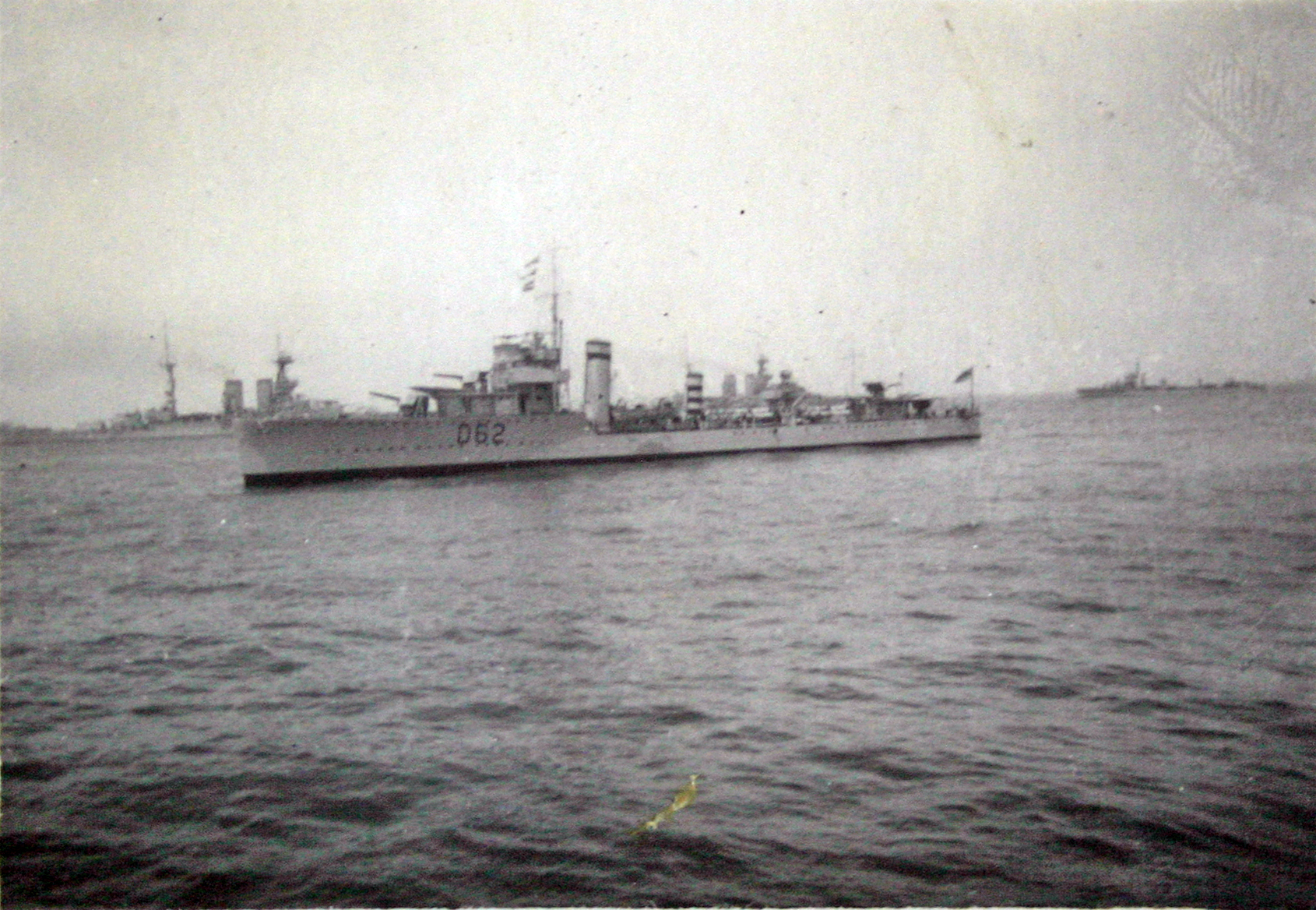
- Wild Swan in the Mediterranean in 1925

History

United Kingdom
- Name: HMS Wild Swan
- Ordered: January 1918
- Builder: Swan Hunter and Wigham Richardson, Wallsend-on-Tyne
- Laid down: July 1918
- Launched: 17 May 1919
- Commissioned: 14 November 1919
- Honours and awards: Dunkirk 1940; Atlantic 1940–42
- Fate: Sunk after air attack; 17 June 1942

General characteristics
- Class & type: Admiralty Modified W-class destroyer
- Displacement: 1,140 tons standard, 1,550 tons full
- Length: 300 feet (91 m) o/a, 312 feet (95 m) p/p
- Beam: 29.5 feet (9.0 m)
- Draught: 9 feet (2.7 m), 11.25 feet (3.43 m) under full load
- Propulsion: Yarrow type Water-tube boilers, Brown-Curtis geared steam turbines, 2 shafts, 30,000 shp
- Speed: 32 knots (59 km/h)
- Range: 320-370 tons oil, 3,500 nautical miles (6,500 km) at 15 knots (28 km/h), 900 nautical miles (1,700 km) at 32 knots (59 km/h)
- Complement: 127
- Sensors & processing systems: ASDIC fitted 1939; Type 286M Air Warning RADAR fitted 1941
- Armament: As built 1920; 4 × BL 4.7 in (120-mm) Mk.I guns, mount P Mk.I; 2 × QF 2 pdr Mk.II "pom-pom" (40 mm L/39); 6 × 21-inch Torpedo Tubes; War Modifications cumulative; 3 × BL 4.7 in (120-mm) Mk.I guns, mount P Mk.I; 2 × QF 2 pdr Mk.II "pom-pom" (40 mm L/39); 1 × QF 12 pounder AA gun; 3 × 21-inch Torpedo Tubes

HMS Wild Swan was an Admiralty modified W-class destroyer built for the Royal Navy. She was one of four destroyers ordered in 1918 from Swan Hunter and Wigham Richardson, Wallsend-on-Tyne under the 14th Order for Destroyers of the Emergency War Program of 1917–18. She was the second Royal Navy ship to carry the name, after the sloop HMS Wild Swan in 1876. Like her sisters, she was completed too late to see action in the First World War.

== Construction and design ==
Wild Swan was one of seven Modified W-class destroyers that were completed after World War I, out of an original order for 38 ships issued in April 1918. She was built by Swan Hunter at Wallsend on Tyne, being laid down in July 1918, launched on 17 May 1919 and completed on 14 November 1919. (Note: Friedman gives the date of completion as 13 November.)

Wild Swan was 312 feet (95.1 m) long overall and 300 feet (91.4 m) between perpendiculars, with a beam of 29 feet 6 inches (8.99 m) and a draught of between 10 feet 9 inches (3.28 m) and 11 feet 7 1/2 inches (3.54 m) depending on load. Displacement was 1,112 long tons (1,130 t) standard and 1,505 long tons (1,529 t) deep load. Three oil-fed Yarrow boilers raising steam at 250 pounds per square inch (1,700 kPa) fed Brown-Curtis geared steam turbines which developed 27,000 shaft horsepower (20,000 kW), driving two screws for a maximum designed speed of 34 knots (63 km/h; 39 mph). The ship carried 387 long tons (393 t) of oil giving a range of 3,210 nautical miles (5,940 km; 3,690 mi) at 15 knots (28 km/h; 17 mph).

She shipped four 4.7 in (120 mm) BL guns on four single center-line mounts. These were disposed as two forward and two aft in super imposed firing positions. Anti-aircraft armament consisted of two 2-pounder "pom-pom" autocannon. Six 21-inch torpedo tubes were fitted in two triple mounts on the center-line. She had a crew of 134 officers and other ranks.

== Pre-war service ==
On commissioning, the ship joined the 3rd Destroyer Flotilla, Atlantic Fleet, based at Port Edgar on the Firth of Forth and from March to July 1920, operated in the Baltic. She remained with the 3rd Flotilla when the Royal Navy's Destroyer Flotillas were reorganised from large flotillas of 16 destroyers and a leader to smaller units of eight ships and a leader in 1921. The 3rd Destroyer Flotilla, including Wild Swan, transferred from the Atlantic Fleet to the Mediterranean Fleet in September 1922 as a result of the Chanak Crisis, a war scare between Britain and Turkey towards the end of the Greco-Turkish War. The 3rd Flotilla assisted in the evacuation of Greeks from Turkish territory after the end of the year, escorting transports carrying Greek troops. On 24–25 December 1923, she took part in the unsuccessful hunt for the French airship Dixmunde, searching the Gulf of Gabès, although Dixmunde had in fact been destroyed in an explosion off Sicily on 21 December. Wild Swan had her boilers retubed at Sheerness dockyard in June–July 1926. As a result of the outbreak of the Chinese Civil War the 3rd Destroyer Flotilla was despatched from the Mediterranean to China in order to protect British interests, arriving at Hong Kong on 15 October 1926. Wild Swan was based at Jiujiang on the Yangtze river from January to June 1927, and on 26 March Wild Swan and the river gunboat Woodlark intercepted the British steamer Kiangwo which had been seized by Chinese Nationalist troops to ferry troops up the Yangtze. After negotiation, the Nationalists released the vessel, paying compensation to the ship's owners. The Flotilla re-assembled at Hong Kong on 1 May 1928 to prepare to return to home waters, but departure was delayed by the Jinan incident, a clash between Chinese Nationalist and Japanese troops, with the Flotilla not leaving until 8 July.

The 3rd Flotilla was re-equipped with A-class destroyers in 1930, and Wild Swan was placed in reserve. She was re-commissioned in 1931, joining the 8th Destroyer Flotilla on the China Station. Wild Swan transferred to the 1st Destroyer Flotilla based at Singapore in December 1934. The flotilla transferred to the Mediterranean during the Abyssinian crisis. The outbreak of the Spanish Civil War in July 1936 saw Wild Swan at Gibraltar and on 23 July she was patrolling in the Straits of Gibraltar when she was near missed by bombs dropped by Nationalist bombers, which resulted in Wild Swan firing back at the aircraft. Between 25 and 28 July she took part in the evacuation of civilians from Huelva, and then returned to the United Kingdom, reaching Spithead on 31 July. Wild Swan then joined the Local Defence Flotilla at Portsmouth, taking part in the Coronation Fleet Review for King George VI on 20 May 1937.

On 23 August 1937, Wild Swan was paid off into reserve, and remained in reserve at Portsmouth into 1939. She underwent a long refit at Chatham in late 1939 to update her equipment, including the fitting of anti-submarine detection equipment (ASDIC). This refit and consequent trials did not complete until December 1939.

== Second World War ==
=== Early operations ===
After her refit, Wild Swan was allocated to the 18th Destroyer Flotilla; however, in January 1940 she participated in trials on degaussing equipment, attached to the torpedo school, HMS Vernon. On 25 February 1940, Wild Swan joined the 18th Flotilla and commenced operations. On 4 March, Wild Swan and sister ship Versatile were dispatched from Plymouth to join the sloop Leith in the search for a German U-boat that a merchant ship had reported sighting west of the Scilly Isles. Leith attacked a possible contact on that day, with Wild Swan joining in during the attacks on 5 March. Although depth charges brought up an oil slick, it was concluded that the contact was a false alarm, and the ships had been attacking a pre-existing wreck. On 11 March, the German submarine U28 torpedoed the Dutch tanker Eulota and Wild Swan, Winchelsea and the leader Broke were sent to investigate. Wild Swan rescued Eulota's crew before Broke scuttled the remains of the tanker. Wild Swan continued with convoy escort duties and investigating reports of U-boats through the rest of March and into April 1940.

=== Holland, Boulogne and Dunkirk ===
On 18 April, Wild Swan transferred to the 19th Destroyer Flotilla based at Dover. On 10 May 1940, Germany invaded the Netherlands, Belgium and Luxembourg. Part of Britain's response was "Operation XD", with four destroyers (Wild Swan, Whitshed, Verity and Brilliant) embarking demolition teams in order to destroy key facilities at Dutch ports before they could be captured by the Germans. Wild Swan was tasked with landing its party at the Hook of Holland, arriving there on the afternoon of 10 May. She shelled German paratroops in a wood to the east of Hook of Holland on 11 May. She received damage to her starboard propeller while alongside at the Hook of Holland, and on 12 May was near missed by bombs from a German Junkers Ju 87 Stuka dive bomber which damaged the ship's condensers, before rescuing survivors from the passenger ship Prinses Juliana, which had been sunk by German dive bombers. Wild Swan returned to Dover on 13 May, and went into dock to repair her damaged propeller and condensers.

On 21 May, Wild Swan was ordered to Boulogne, threatened by advancing German troops, picking up 150 British civilians and ferrying them back to Dover. On 22 May she crossed the Channel to Dunkirk to carry out escort operations, but was diverted to Boulogne to carry out shore bombardment operations against advancing German troops along with the British destroyers HMS Vimy and Keith and the French destroyers Chacal, Cyclone, Bourrasque, Foudroyant, Fougueux, Frondeur, Jaguar, Mistral and Siroco. They were attacked by German bombers, and Wild Swan was near missed by a German bomb, with splinters killing three men and seriously wounding another. On 23 May, Wild Swan took a demolition party to Dunkirk, and returned to Dover that afternoon with 155 military and civilians rescued from Dunkirk. (Note: Kindell says a total of 158 were picked up.) She then returned to Boulogne, where the situation had deteriorated severely, in order to take place in an evacuation of as many British troops as possible. Wild Swan entered Boulogne harbour at 20:25 hrs, shortly after Whitshed and Vimiera had left and was followed in by the destroyers Venomous and Venetia. As Venetia entered the harbour, she was shelled heavily by a German-manned shore battery and German tanks in an attempt to sink the ship in the entrance to the harbour and trap the remaining two ships. While Venetia was hit seven times, Venomous and Wild Swan managed to return fire with their 4.7 inch guns, suppressing the German shelling, so that Venetia could escape while Wild Swan and Venomous embarked troops (403 aboard Wild Swan and 500 aboard Venomous) before the two ships rejoined Venetia and returned to Dover. On 26 May Operation Dynamo, the evacuation of the BEF from Dunkirk started. Wild Swan escorted the ferry Maid of Orleans, carrying drinking water for the trapped troops and the transport Canterbury to Dunkirk on 26 May, picking up General Ralph Eastwood and his staff before returning to Dover. She was then ordered to Portsmouth for a short refit, where her boilers were cleaned and the aft set of torpedo tubes was replaced by a 12-pounder (i.e. 3-inch (76-mm)) anti-aircraft gun, and two extra depth charge throwers fitted.

=== Channel and North Sea operations ===
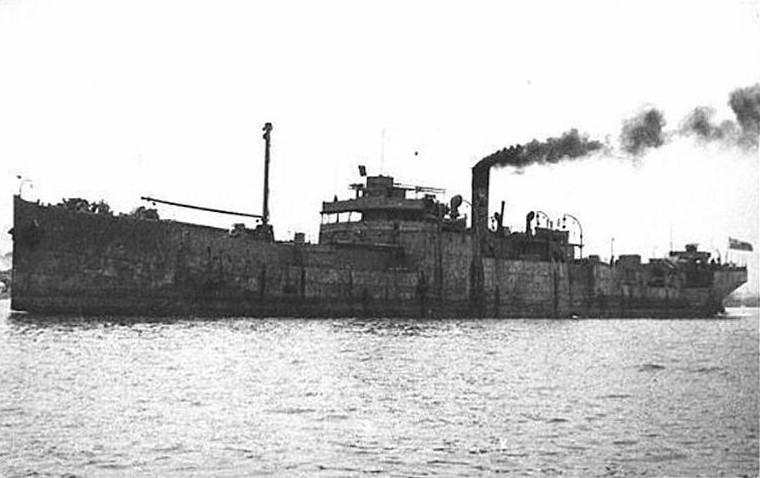
RFA War Nawab, one of the old tankers to be used as Fire ships as part of Operation Lucid

After the refit, on 8 June, Wild Swan rejoined the 19th Destroyer Flotilla. On 17 June, Wild Swan landed a demolition party at St Malo, calling in at Jersey on the way there, where she requisitioned seven small merchant ships to take place in the evacuation of troops from St Malo, part of Operation Cycle. The 19th Flotilla was then based at Harwich, escorting convoys in the North Sea, and carrying out anti-invasion patrols, together with offensive strikes against enemy shipping. On 30 July, Wild Swan was carrying out an anti-invasion patrol with Whitshed and Ambuscade when Whitshed struck a mine. Wild Swan towed Whitshed stern first back to Harwich. On the night of 10/11 September, Wild Swan, Veteran and Malcolm carried out an offensive sweep off the Belgian coast, attacking several barges and trawlers that were being used as escorts, sinking at least one of the barges and two trawlers. On the night of 13/14 September Wild Swan and Venomous again struck against German coastal shipping off Boulogne, engaging several German trawlers, before breaking off the engagement when coming under fire from German coastal artillery. On 16 September, Wild Swan collided with the destroyer Worcester, sustaining minor damage to the ship's bow.

Later in September, Wild Swan was allocated to Operation Lucid, a plan to convert old oil tankers as Fire ships and use them to attack invasion barges in French ports. Wild Swan was part of the escort force on the first attempt to carry out Lucid, on the night of 25/26 September, where War Nizam and War Nawab were to be sacrificed, but this was abandoned because of unsuitable weather conditions and the poor condition of the fire ships. A second attempt on 2 October was cancelled due to poor weather. A third attempt was made on the night of 4/5 October, with War Nizam and Mytilus being sent against Calais and Oakfield against Boulogne. Wild Swan again formed part of the escort covering force, but unsuitable weather conditions again caused cancellation.

=== Atlantic escort ===
On 30 October, Wild Swan was transferred to the 7th Escort Group based at Liverpool. One early escort mission with the 7th Escort Group was Convoy HX 83, which Wild Swan joined on 4 November. On the night of 4/5 November, the German U-boat U-99, commanded by Otto Kretschmer, fresh from sinking the Armed Merchant Cruisers Laurentic and Patroclus, attacked the convoy, firing torpedoes from outside the convoy, with the torpedoes passing between Wild Swan and the destroyer Beagle, patrolling on the East side of the Convoy, and sinking the tanker Scottish Maiden. Neither Wild Swan or Beagle spotted U-99, and despite seeing an explosion, did not realise that the attack had come from their side of the convoy. The crews of Wild Swan and Beagle, both new to North Atlantic convoy operations, were criticised for keeping a poor lookout.

On 23 December, Wild Swan was departing Liverpool in company with the destroyer Warwick when Warwick set off an acoustic mine, and was badly damaged, with the engine room flooded and the ship settling low in the water. Wild Swan towed Warwick back to Liverpool, allowing the damaged ship to be repaired. On 9 January Wild Swan was detached from Convoy OB 270 to search for the survivors of the cargo ship SS Clytoneus which had been sunk by a German Focke-Wulf Fw 200 Condor long-range bomber the previous day. Wild Swan and the Armed Merchant Cruiser Esperance Bay rescued the survivors later that same day. Despite being short of fuel, Wild Swan was then ordered to search for the steamer SS Bassano, which had been torpedoed and sunk by U-105, with Wild Swan and Esperance Bay rescuing Bassano's survivors. On 29 January, Wild Swan was returning to Liverpool when she encountered the steamer SS Westmoreland, which had struck a mine earlier that day and had been abandoned by her crew. The steamer remained afloat, and Wild Swan recovered Westmoreland's crew, put them back aboard the steamer and assisted in the recovery of the stricken vessel, with Wild Swan's crew later being awarded £600 for taking part in the salvage of the ship.

Wild Swan continued escort operations in the North Atlantic until March 1941, when she underwent a much-needed refit at the Royal Albert Dock in London. The ship's machinery was overhauled extensively, and Type 286 surface search radar fitted. The dockyard was heavily bombed on 19 April and Wild Swan was slightly damaged by German bombs, with near misses causing leaking oil tanks

=== Africa and Gibraltar ===
After completing her refit on 26 April, Wild Swan joined the 1st Destroyer Flotilla based at Portsmouth. A shortage of escorts off West Africa resulted in Wild Swan being ordered to transfer to Freetown, Sierra Leone. Before she was due to sail for Africa, the sinking of the British battlecruiser Hood by the Bismarck in the Battle of the Denmark Strait, resulted in Wild Swan, together with Wivern and Vansittart being ordered to stand by at Plymouth, ready to be sent to intercept the German Battleship or to escort the battleships Rodney and King George V (there was a chance that fuel shortages could force the Battleships' destroyer escort to turn back, leaving them unprotected against submarine attack). Bismarck was sunk on the night of 26/27 May without the need for the three elderly destroyers to intervene, but late on 27 May, the three destroyers were instead ordered to go to the aid of the Ocean boarding vessel Registan, which had been set on fire by German bombers off Cape Cornwall, near Land's End. Wild Swan picked up twenty survivors from Registan, although four of them died. The three destroyers joined the escort to the Cape-bound convoy WS-8X on 1 June 1941, being detached from the convoy on 3 June and reaching Gibraltar on 6 June. The three destroyers took part in escort duties during the rendezvous of the aircraft carriers Victorious and Ark Royal prior to Operation Tracer, but Wild Swan returned to Gibraltar on 10 June. The three destroyers set out for West Africa on 13 June, sailing for Freetown via Bathurst, and arriving at Freetown on 18 June.

Wild Swan carried out escort operations from Freetown through the rest of June and July, but by then the pressure off West Africa had reduced, and Wild Swan was ordered to Gibraltar, reaching there on 10 August. The ship soon began a regular pattern of escorting the Gibraltar to Britain HG convoys as far as fuel would last, this beginning with Convoy HG 70, where the strong escort managed to repel a series of attacks by enemy submarines, so that the only loss was one freighter sunk by bombing.

== Loss ==
On 16 June 1942, Wild Swan was in the Western Approaches as part of the escort for convoy HG84. She was detached for refuelling, and happened to be passing through a group of Spanish trawlers, when a squadron of 12 German Junkers Ju 88 bombers mistook these vessels as the convoy and attacked them. Wild Swan replied vigorously, claiming six German aircraft shot down. She was, however, already seriously damaged by four near-misses, she lost steering control and collided with one of the Spanish trawlers, which sank almost immediately. She rescued 11 survivors from the trawler, but Wild Swan also sank (at 49°52′N 10°44′W). The British reported that three of the trawlers were also sunk by bombs.

A searching RAF Short Sunderland flying boat found the group of small boats and dinghies the next day, and survivors of both vessels were subsequently rescued, but 31 British seamen died through exposure. According to a Ministry of Defence historical document: 17 June 1942 HMS Vansittart "Picked up 10 officers and 123 ratings, five of whom seriously injured, from Wild Swan, (sunk after damaged by air attack and collision with Spanish trawler in Bay of Biscay) and 11 men from Spanish trawler." The survivors were landed at Milford Haven.

The Wild Swan's commander, Claude Sclater, was awarded the Distinguished Service Order for the action.
