= Twyford Waterworks =

Preserved waterworks and pumping station in Twyford, Winchester, England

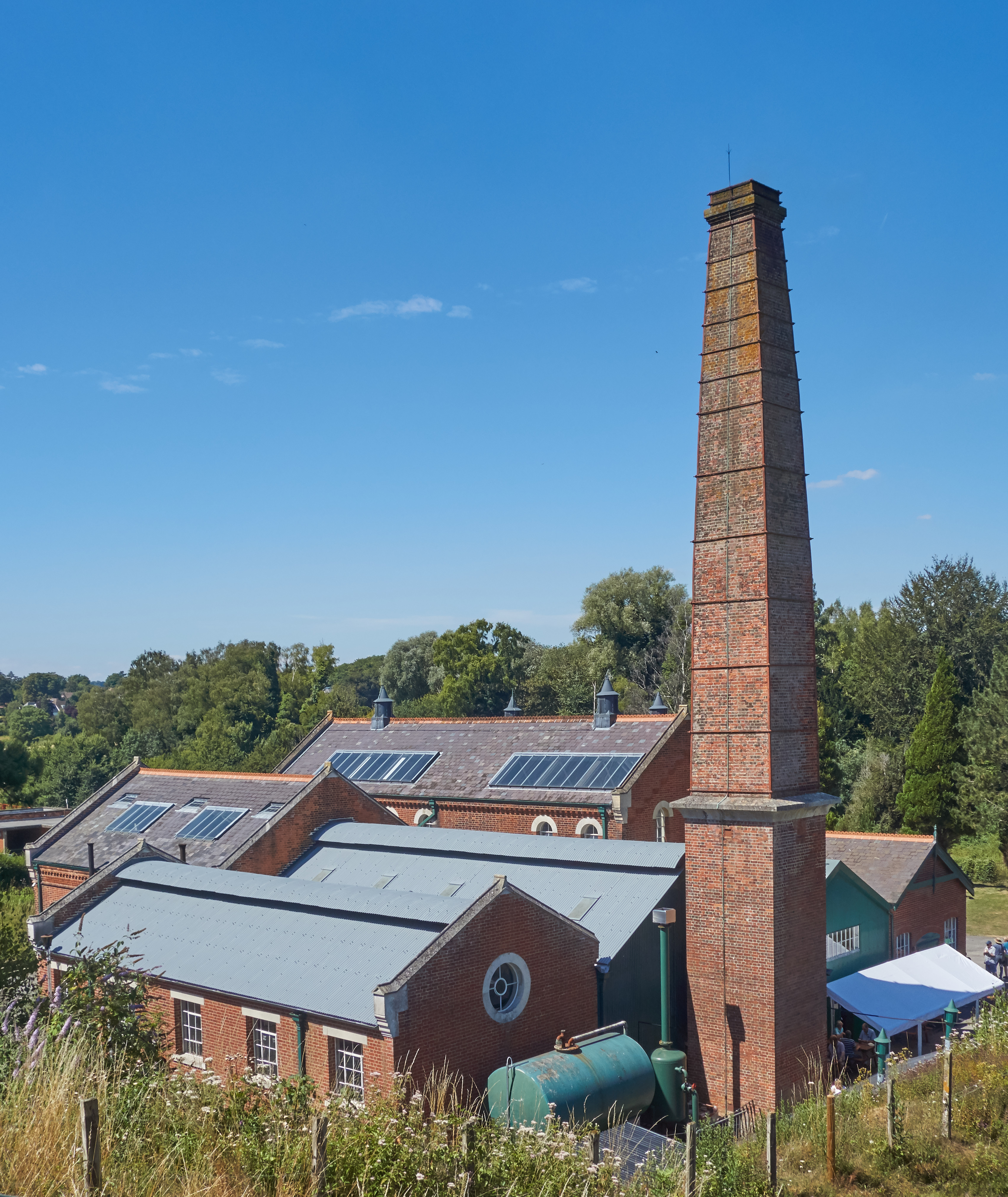

- Shown in Hampshire
- Location: Twyford, Hampshire, United Kingdom
- Coordinates: 51°1′15.600″N 1°17′55.680″W
- Website: www.twyfordwaterworks.co.uk

Twyford Waterworks is a preserved pumping station and waterworks situated close to the village of Twyford and the city of Winchester in Hampshire, England. It is a scheduled monument and now operates as a museum. The site is leased by the Twyford Waterworks Trust and is open on selected days during the year.

The waterworks were originally built for the South Hampshire Water Company in 1898 to supply water to Winchester and Southampton. They were extended over the years, including in 1913 to accommodate a new steam engine and boilers, and again in 1930s. The site passed to the Southern Water Authority in 1974, the year after it had been scheduled as a monument. The redundant parts of the site were leased to the Twyford Waterworks Trust in 1992.

== History ==
The buildings on the site date back to various years between 1898 and 1935, and include the original steam powered pumping station and associated boiler house. These still contain a Hathorn Davey triple expansion steam pumping engine dating from 1914, and three Babcock & Wilcox boilers dating from 1906, 1903 and 1916 respectively. There are also three diesel engines, supplied by Ruston & Hornsby and dating from the 1930s when the plant was updated. The site also encompasses a water softening plant, fed by the pumping engine, and three lime kilns that were used to supply the water softening plant and that were in turn fed by on-site chalk pits. There is also a 2 ft (610 mm) gauge industrial railway, including a rope-hauled inclined plane, used to transport materials around the site.

The borehole that fed the pumping station is still in use and supplies 5,000,000 imperial gallons (23,000,000 L; 6,000,000 US gal) of water every day, but now uses modern submersible electric pumps. The supply is operated by Southern Water who, as the privatised successors to the Southern Water Authority, retain ownership of the site.

== The Buildings ==
The Steam Engine House – The Engine House contains the 1914 Hathorn Davey triple expansion steam engine which could pump up to 11 megalitres of water per day up to the service reservoir. The well is situated in the adjacent room behind the bricked-up archway. The pitman (which is preserved in the Boiler House) was connected to the crank at the end of the engine and protruded through the archway to operate the well pumps. The engine also drove pumps situated beneath it to pump the water up to the reservoir. The same well provides water today using submersible pumps driven by A.C. electric motors.

The Boiler House – In the original part of the building are two Babcock & Wilcox boilers, one of which was installed in 1906 and was returned to steam in 2018 with the aid of money from the Heritage Lottery Fund. Only four Babcock & Wilcox boilers survive to this day and Twyford has three of them. Running along the ground in front of the boilers you can see the railway track for the wagons which brought coal to fire them. Now housing the new Discovery Zone is in the 1916 extension to the Boiler House which was built to house the Babcock & Wilcox boiler of 1916. The boiler has been left as a skeleton so that you can see how it was constructed and functioned.

The Lime Kilns - Water pumped from the chalk is termed ‘hard’ water. From 1903 to 1969, except in time of war, the water supplied from Twyford was softened. The ‘lime softening process’ used required supplies of quicklime which was made from chalk from the quarry burnt in lime kilns. The first two kilns were built 1901–1902 and three additional kilns were built to supplement these in 1930. It was a labour intensive process and was an extremely hazardous environment in which to work.

The Filter House – Most of the ‘limescale’ produced by the softening process settled in the softening tank and the rest was removed by the Haines’ patent filters in the tanks on the south side of the filter house. After filtration the water was pumped up to the service reservoir. On the other side of the central gangway are two small pumping sets typical of private supplies: a Crossley gas engine driving a Climax pump, and a Lister diesel engine driving aTangye pump. The external shape of the building is unusual in that the downside edge of the roof is very close to the ground (because there is no need for windows).

The Mixing House – Here the quicklime produced in the kilns was ‘slaked’ with water to make a dilute solution of calcium hydroxide called ‘lime water’. This was added to the water from the wells in the softening tank and precipitated out most of the calcium carbonate or ‘limescale’ The hydraulic engine which dives the machinery is itself a rare survivor, along with a similar engine which drives the winch to operate the railway incline.

The Diesel House – The increase of the population of the area in the 1920s and 1930s led to a large expansion of the waterworks. The Diesel House was built to house diesel pumping sets to supplement the steam engines. It contains two Ruston sets, one to raise water from a new well under the building and one to supply the service reservoir.

The Transfer House – A third pumping set was later added in 1934 to transfer water from Twyford to Yew Hill service reservoir, was delivered before the completion of the diesel house. It was placed in its own ‘temporary’ wooden hut where remains to this day.

== The Railway ==
The railway was built in 1903 to serve the kilns and the boiler house. It was the most efficient way of moving bulk materials such as coal and chalk around the site. Wagons were pushed on the level sections and a water powered winch was installed to haul them up, and lower them down, the incline to the lime kilns.

== Wildlife Around the Waterworks ==
Four acres of downland were enclosed for the construction of the Waterworks in 1898 but the buildings required less than half of the land. Some of the additional space was used to quarry chalk for making lime, some was used to dump waste but about two acres were left, being neither cultivated nor grazed. As a result the site has unusual and valuable parcels of land including scrub, tall grassland and chalk meadow.

The essential base of the wildlife element is the diverse collection of native plants, over 200 species in all, that provide the habitat for butterflies, bumblebees, dragonflies, moles, rabbits, badgers, songbirds, hawks and many other species.

Management of the land is undertaken so that the chalk grassland plant species thrive and particular plants such as nettles, hemp agrimony and ragwort do not become dominant. A pond was installed so that a wider selection of species will use the site.

== Gallery ==
The steam engine

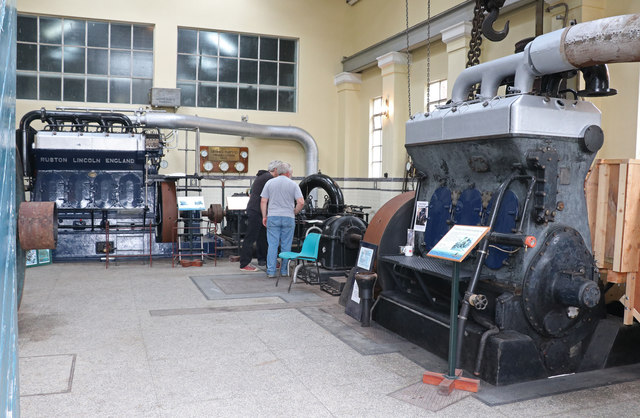
The diesel engines

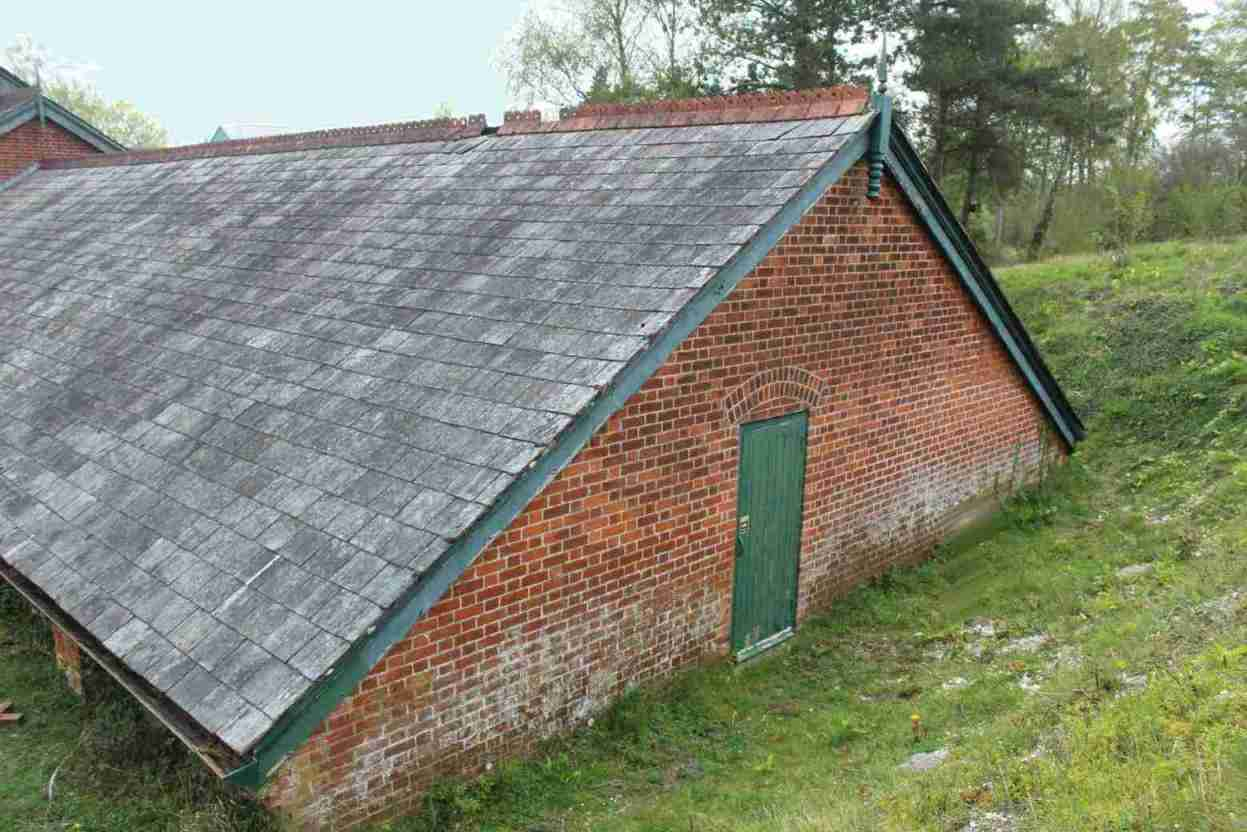
Twyford Waterworks - Filter house with low side walls

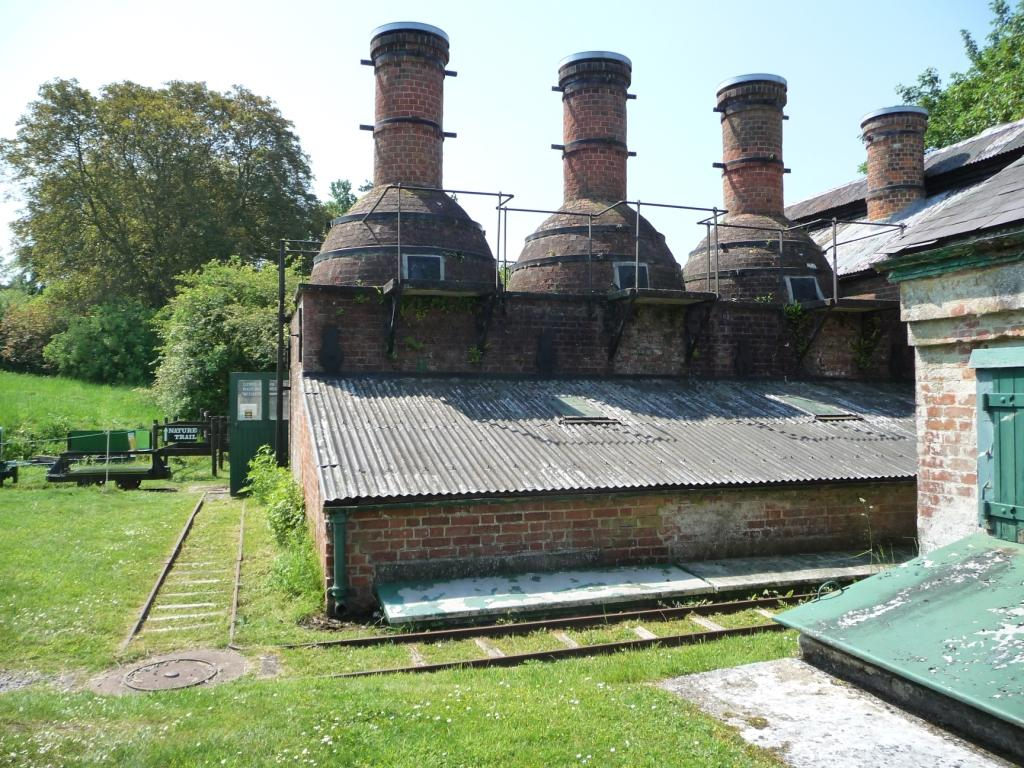
The lime kilns

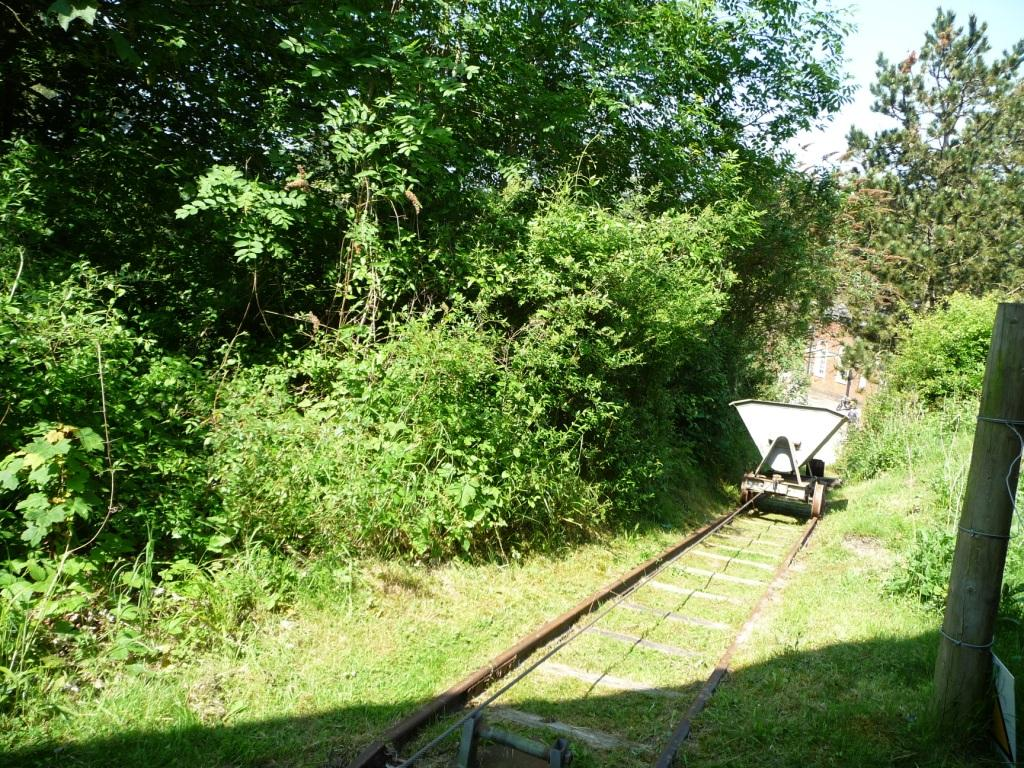
The incline

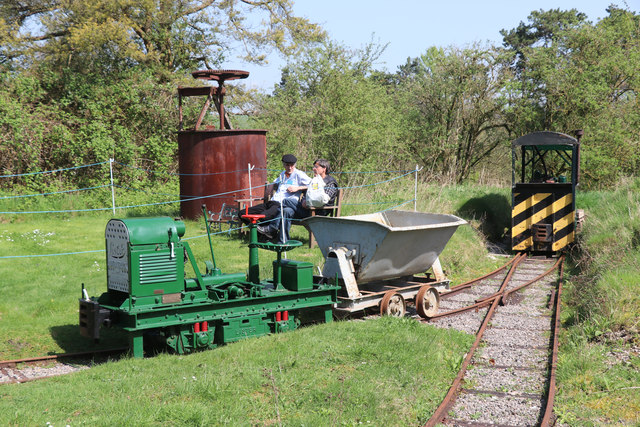
The railway
