= Alban Arnold =

English cricketer (1892–1916)

Personal information
- Full name: Alban Charles Phidias Arnold
- Born: 19 November 1892; Tattenhall, Cheshire, England
- Died: 7 July 1916 (aged 23); Ovillers-la-Boisselle, Somme, France
- Batting: Right-handed
- Bowling: Unknown
- Role: Wicket-keeper

Domestic team information
- Years: Team
- 1912–1914: Cambridge University
- 1912–1914: Hampshire

Career statistics
| Competition | First-class |
|---|---|
| Matches | 22 |
| Runs scored | 836 |
| Batting average | 25.33 |
| 100s/50s | –/7 |
| Top score | 89 |
| Balls bowled | 6 |
| Wickets | 0 |
| Bowling average | – |
| 5 wickets in innings | – |
| 10 wickets in match | – |
| Best bowling | – |
| Catches/stumpings | 13/2 |
- Source: Cricinfo, 24 December 2009

Alban Charles Phidias Arnold (19 November 1892 — 7 July 1916) was an English first-class cricketer and British Army officer.

The son of The Reverend Charles Lowther Arnold, he was born in July 1916 at Tattenhall, Cheshire. He was educated at Twyford School, before progressing to Malvern College where he was in the college cricket team. From there, he matriculated to Magdalene College, Cambridge in 1911. While studying at Cambridge, Arnold was a member of the Cambridge University Cricket Club, for whom he made his debut in first-class cricket against the touring South Africans at Fenner's. He played once for Cambridge in 1912, but did play in four first-class matches for Hampshire (qualifying through residency as his father was Reverend at Fareham) in the same season, including three matches in the County Championship. He did not appear for Cambridge University in 1913, but did appear for Hampshire against Cambridge that year. Arnold made four appearances for the Cambridge team in 1914, including playing in The University Match at Lord's against Oxford University, for which he gained his blue. He also made eleven first-class appearances for Hampshire in that season's County Championship. For Cambridge University, he scored 229 runs at an average of 25.44, with a highest score of 89; for Hampshire, he made sixteen appearances and scored 542 runs at an average of 24.63; he made five half centuries, with a highest score of 76. In addition to playing first-class cricket for Cambridge University and Hampshire, he also made a single appearance for the Free Foresters against Cambridge University in 1914, scoring a half century against his contemporaries.

With the start of the First World War, the cessation of cricket during the conflict was enacted. Arnold served in the war, being commissioned as a second lieutenant into the 3rd Battalion, Royal Berkshire Regiment in September 1914. He joined the Royal Fusiliers shortly after, and saw action with them during the Battle of the Somme. It was during this battle that he was killed in action on 7 July 1916 at Ovillers-la-Boisselle. He has no known grave and is commemorated on the Thiepval Memorial. In the closing line of his obituary in Wisden, it remarked on Arnold's promise by concluding: "He would probably have developed into a cricketer of very high class".
