= St Mary's Church, Twyford =

St Mary's Church
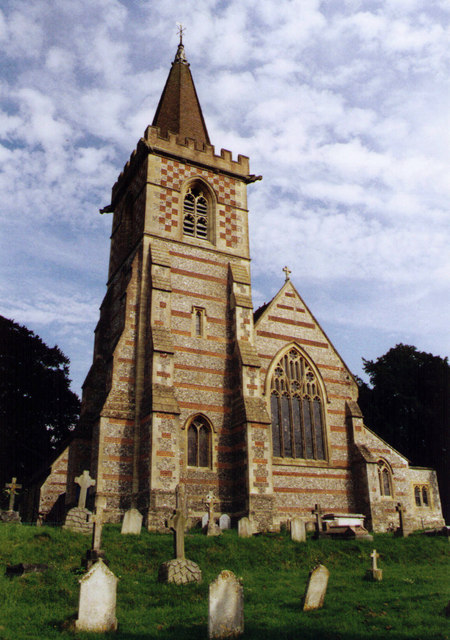
- St Mary's Church
- 51°1′23″N 1°18′54″W
- Location: Twyford, Hampshire, England
- Denomination: Church of England
- Website: http://www.sdgateway.org.uk/st-mary-twyford/

Administration
- Province: Canterbury
- Diocese: Winchester

St Mary's Church, Twyford is a Church of England parish church dedicated to the Virgin Mary in the village of Twyford, Hampshire.

== History ==
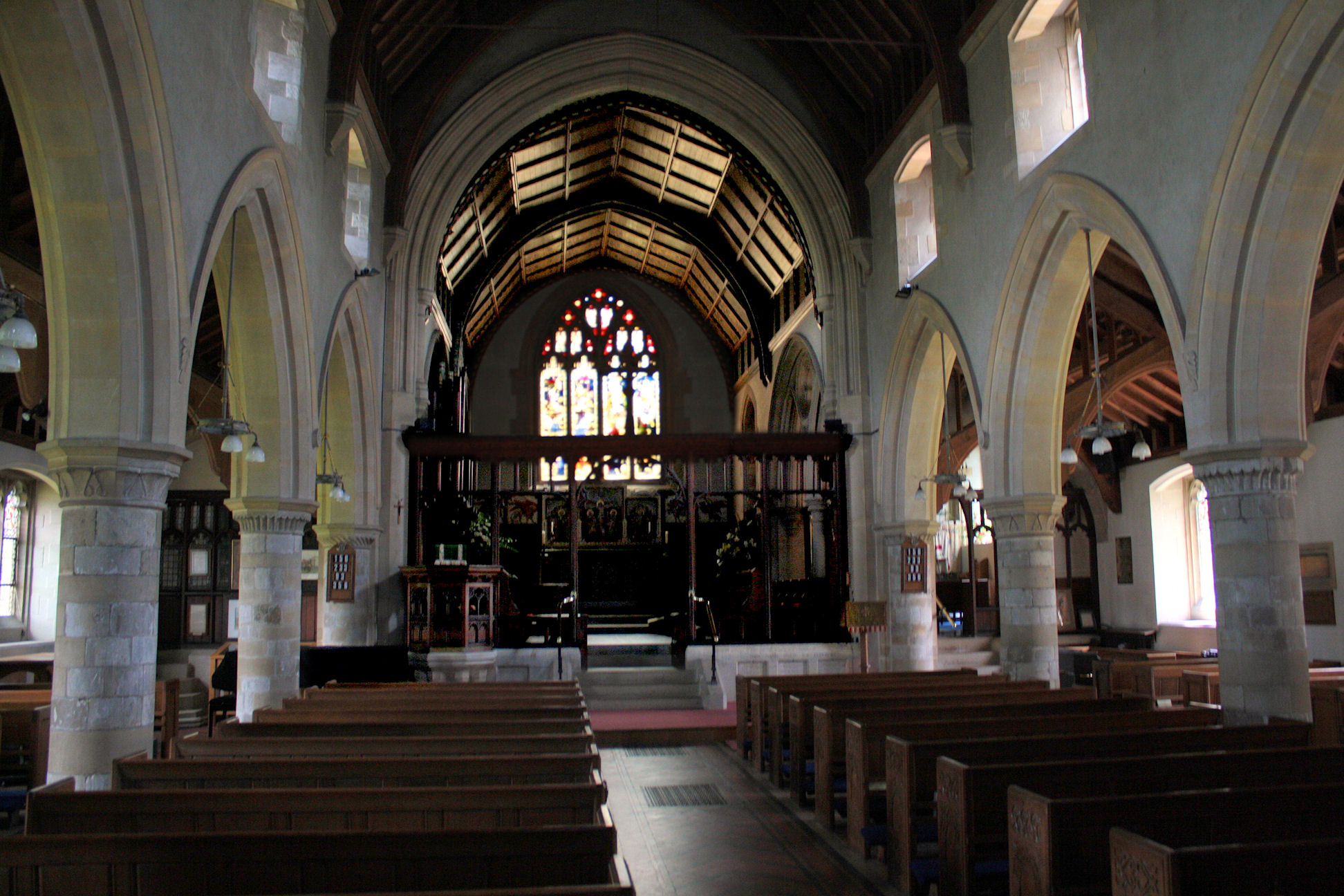
The church's interior.

The village's first Saxon church is mentioned in the Domesday Book in 1086. A Norman church replaced it in the 12th century – this was extensively rebuilt in 1402. In Thomas Moule's English Counties (1837 edition), the church is referred to as "a vicarage, value £12 12s. 8d., in the patronage of Emmanuel College, Cambridge. In the chancel is a mural monument, with a bust, by Joseph Nollekens, in memory of Dr. Jonathan Shipley, Bishop of St. Asaph, who died in the year 1788." A square-headed perpendicular window was added to the church around 1520 and a barrel organ in 1838, replaced by a J. Walker pipe organ in 1867.

Population expansion led to the construction of a replacement church to designs by Alfred Waterhouse, completed in 1878 – this used the Norman building's columns, the 1520 window (moved to the vestry's east wall) and the 1402 church's east window (now in the 1924 Lady Chapel), clerestory windows and priest's entrance to the vestry's north side. A new stained glass design was placed in the west window in 1965 and new parish rooms were built below a new gallery at the church's west end in 1995.
