= J. W. Walker & Sons Ltd =

British organ builders

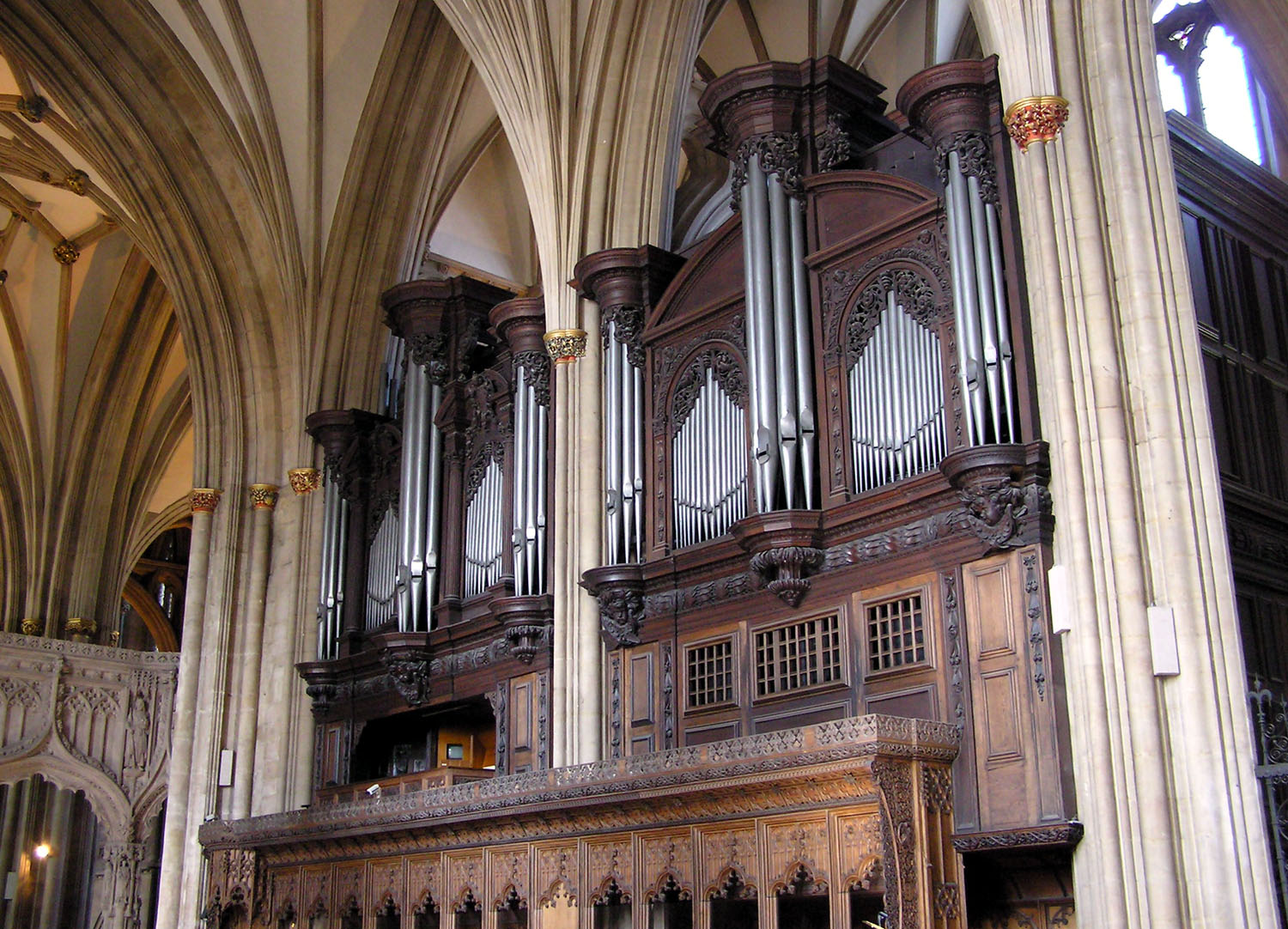
- Bristol Cathedral organ (Walker, 1907)
- Type: Private
- Industry: Organ builders
- Founded: London, UK, 1828
- Founder: Joseph William Walker
- Headquarters: Devizes, Wiltshire, England, UK
- Number of locations: 1
- Area served: UK, Europe, US, worldwide
- Products: Pipe organs
- Website: walkerorgans.com

J. W. Walker & Sons Ltd is a British firm of organ builders established in 1828 by Joseph William Walker in London. Walker organs were popular additions to churches during the Gothic Revival era of church building and restoration in Victorian Britain, and instruments built by Walker are found in many churches around the UK and in other countries. The firm continues to build organs today.

== History ==
=== Joseph William Walker ===
The firm was founded by Joseph William Walker (1802–1870), an apprentice to George Pike England. Walker established his own organ-building business in Soho, London in 1828, and moved later to Francis Street off Tottenham Court Road.

Notable initially for pleasing small church and barrel organs, Walker achieved a breakthrough with the order for a large three-manual instrument at Romsey Abbey, Hampshire in 1858, including a thirty-two foot Pedal Open Wood. This instrument was in 2007 substantially in its original state, a recent renovation confirming its outstanding musical qualities.

Walker died in 1870, and his youngest and only surviving son, James John Walker, took over the firm.

=== James John Walker ===
Arguably, the heyday of the company occurred towards the end of the nineteenth century under the leadership of James John Walker (1846–1922), the youngest and only surviving son of Joseph William. The company developed a reputation in the 1890s for excellence in massive diapason voicing using scales and pressures for flue work greater than those used by Hill or Willis. The effect was rolling and magnificent. Notable instruments included those in London at Holy Trinity Sloane Street and St Margaret's Westminster; cathedrals at York, Rochester, and Bristol; and the organs at St Mary's, Portsea and St Matthew's, Northampton. Walker also later rebuilt the Gray & Davison concert organ at the Crystal Palace, increasing its power to carry across the vast space of the central transept. The sequence of church instruments continued into the twentieth century, including the large instrument at the Roman Catholic church of The Sacred Heart, Wimbledon, built in 1912.

After James Walker's death, the reputation of the firm in the "first division" of British organ building lasted through the Second World War. By the 1960s, British organ design had become not only eclectic but, to some ears, meekly derivative. The rebuild at Wimborne Minster in 1965 incorporated pipework from earlier periods beginning in 1664; the old material was made to sit with elements in vogue at the time of the Walker rebuild to create an organ whose character could be said to be either of all its history or properly representative of none of it, except perhaps 1965 itself. Later commentators have levelled harsh words at the 1960s "Jack-of-all-trades" British pipe organ without realizing that for the players of the day, such innovations drawn from European practice entirely outside the original scheme and character of the instruments, did at least open new avenues for players just getting used to attempt, for example, baroque performance practice.

The Walker firm's work was also present at Liverpool's new Catholic cathedral (1967–68). The instrument could be seen as a response to the existing instrument by Henry Willis III at the neighbouring Anglican cathedral, and recordings by several European players of note, including Jeanne Demessieux and Flor Peeters, were made there.

=== Robert Pennells and the move to Brandon ===
Eventually, a recognizable revival came to the Walker firm with its move, in stages, from west London to the small town of Brandon, on the Suffolk/Norfolk border, where the organ building firm and a parts supply business ("P & S") occupied modern workshops. In the 1980s, under the leadership of Robert Pennells, his German (Klais)-trained son Andrew, B. Q. S. F. Buchanan and head voicer Michael Butler, a number of new and prestigious instruments were made, including town hall organs at Bolton in 1985 (after a fire four years before which destroyed a famous 1874 Gray & Davison instrument) and, leading a group of instruments for export, at Adelaide (1989); at Lancing College Chapel in 1986–7; and several years later at London's St Martin-in-the-Fields. The visual effect of a number of the new instruments benefited considerably from the case-designs of David Graebe. Later organs included a Cavaillé-Coll-inspired instrument, built in 1995 at Exeter College, Oxford.

=== Move to Devizes ===
In 1999, Andrew Pennells died and his father, Robert Pennell came out of retirement to replace him. When Robert retired (again) a former Walker apprentice Sebastian Meakin assumed leadership of the company, in 2005. The company retained facilities in Brandon, Suffolk for several years, before consolidating the organisation through a relocation to Devizes in 2016. The company now trades as part of the "Walker Group".

== List of works ==
- Waltham Abbey 1850–1953 (see below)
- St Vedast Foster Lane, Cheapside, London 1853, enlarged 1885
- St Peter and St Paul, East Harling 1854 (originally for St James' Church in Hatcham, moved 1982)
- Romsey Abbey 1858
- St John the Baptist, Penshurst, Kent 1858
- Holy Trinity Church, Bedford, 1859, reinstalled in St Margaret's Church, Ipswich in 1981
- St Audoen's Catholic Church, Dublin 1861
- St Mary's Church, Belstone, Devon 1862 (believed to have been made originally for Knole, Kent)
- St Bartholomew's Church, Arborfield 1863
- St John's Cathedral, Parramatta, Australia 1863
- All Saints Church, Willian, Hertfordshire (1864)
- St Michael and All Angels Church, Hughenden 1864
- St Stephen's Church, Richmond, Victoria, Australia 1865 built for William Philpott, Melbourne, Victoria
- St Margaret's church, Northam 1866
- St Mary's Church, Twyford 1867
- St. Mary’s Church, Shenley Church End, Bucks. MK5 6LL 1870
- Dorchester Abbey 1870–1875
- St Werburgh's Church, Derby 1872
- St John the Divine, Kennington 1875
- All Saints' Church, Maidenhead 1879
- St Peter's Church, Chertsey 1880
- St Andrew’s Church, Seven Hills, Australia 1882 (re-sited 1979)
- St Paul’s Church, Castle Hill, Australia 1883 (Destroyed by fire 1985)
- St Andrew's Church of England, 106 Bethune Rd, Stoke Newington, London N16 5DU - 1886
- St James' Church, Stretham – installed at the time of J P St Aubyn's restoration, 1886.
- St. Alban's Anglican Church, Copenhagen, Denmark (1887, renovated in 1966)
- St Mary's Church, Portsea, Portsmouth 1889
- Holy Trinity Sloane Street 1890
- Holy Trinity Anglican Church, Nice, France 1867
- St Matthew's Church, Northampton 1895
- St George in the Meadows, Nottingham 1895
- St Mary's Cathedral, Gqeberha, South Africa 1897
- St Boniface, Portsmouth 1898, (closed 1962, disposal unknown)
- Royal Holloway College (1886-1978)
- Church of SS Mary and Ambrose, Edgbaston 1898
- Church of The Good Shepherd, Lake 1901
- York Minster 1903
- Hatchlands Park, Surrey 1904
- Hobart Town Hall 1870
- Kingham Hill School 1904
- Liverpool Blue Coat School chapel 1906
- Bristol Cathedral 1907
- Christ the King Catholic Church, Gothenburg, Sweden 1907, reinstalled 2010. Originally built for First Church of Christ Scientist, London (today the Cadogan Hall)
- St John's Church, Watford 1911
- Sacred Heart, Wimbledon 1912
- El Buen Tono Church, Mexico City 1912
- St Peter's Church, Selsey 1912
- St Matthew's, Bayswater 1913
- Holy Trinity Cathedral, Port of Spain 1914
- Holy Trinity Cathedral, Shanghai 1914
- St Mark's Church, Woodcote 1915
- St. Mary's Church, Nottingham 1916
- St Wilfrid's, Portsmouth 1922
- St Clement Eastcheap, London 1926
- St Cyprian's Cathedral, Kimberley, South Africa 1936 (dedicated 1937)
- St. Mary's Church, Wollaton Park, Nottingham 1938
- St. Augustine Chapel, Kingston College, Jamaica, (dedicated 1949, rededicated 2023)
- Holy Trinity Church, Shirebrook 1950
- Grimsby Minster 1951
- London Oratory, London 1952–54
- University of Western Australia, Winthrop Hall, 1965
- St Faith's, Portsmouth 1957?
- St Peter's Italian Church, Clerkenwell 1959
- Ampleforth Abbey, North Yorkshire 1961
- Stanmore Chapel, Middlesex 1961
- Church of the Good Shepherd, Nottingham 1964?
- St. Mary the Virgin, Prestwich, Lancashire 1964
- The Queen's Chapel of the Savoy 1965
- Wimborne Minster 1965
- St Paul's Cathedral, Rockhampton Australia 1965
- St. Olave's Grammar School 1967
- Liverpool Metropolitan Cathedral 1968
- Trinity College, Dublin Chapel (in 18th century case) 1968
- King Edward VI School 1969
- Blackburn Cathedral 1970
- Church of the Ascension, RAF Benson 1972
- St. Leodegarius Church, Basford 1977
- Chichester Cathedral 1980
- Our Lady of the Angels, Worcester, Massachusetts, USA 1985
- St. Bernard Parish, Appleton, Wisconsin, USA 1986
- Lancing College 1987
- Adelaide Town Hall, South Australia, 1989
- St Chad's Cathedral, Birmingham commissioned 1990; installed 1993
- St Peter and St Paul, Bromley 1991
- Exeter College, Oxford 1995
- St. Martin-in-the-Fields, London 1995
- Peace Lutheran Church, Hutchinson, Minnesota, USA 1997
- St. Peter's Evangelical Lutheran Church, St. Peter, Minnesota, USA 1983
- St Cuthbert's Church Edinburgh 1998
- Ongar United Reformed Church, Essex 1886 – thought to have been built for the Courtauld family
- Hustad Church, Norway 2001
- The Royal Hospital School 1933
- City of London School, London – installed 1969, moved to its current location in the new school buildings 1986
- All Saints' Anglican Cathedral, Nairobi, Kenya
- Dunfermline Abbey (1966)
- St Mark's Episcopal Church, Glen Ellyn, Illinois 1991, expanded 2015
- St. Stephen's Episcopal Church, Houston, Texas, United States of America. (1988)

== Walker's work at Waltham Abbey ==
Maintenance of the organ at Waltham Abbey, installed in 1819 by Flight & Robson, was taken over by J. W. Walker in 1850. The company carried out a number of additions and reconstructions to it between then and 1953, including installing a replacement in 1879. In 1953 they "completely dismantled and rebuilt" it and resited the console at a cost of "under £7,000." Since 2003, this organ has been in the care of Harrison & Harrison of Durham. An appeal was launched in 2007 to raise £250,000 for a replacement organ.

The organ removed in 1879 could be the "fine Walker organ" said to have come from Waltham Abbey and to have made "an absolutely splendid sound". This instrument was installed at Little Clacton, Essex in 1939, and later sold on to Christ Church, Greenwich.
