= Andrew Longmore (journalist) =

English cricketer and sports journalist (1953–2019)

Personal information
- Full name: Andrew Nigel Murray Longmore
- Born: 24 September 1953; Woolwich, Kent, England
- Died: 11 April 2019 (aged 65); Menton, Provence-Alpes-Côte d'Azur, France
- Batting: Right-handed
- Role: Wicket-keeper

Domestic team information
- Years: Team
- 1973–1975: Oxford University

Career statistics
Competition	First-class
Matches	2
Runs scored	28
Batting average	9.33
100s/50s	–/–
Top score	15
Catches/stumpings	3/–
- Source: Cricinfo, 26 June 2020

Andrew Nigel Murray Longmore (24 September 1953 – 11 April 2019) was an English first-class cricketer and sports journalist.

Longmore was born at Woolwich in September 1953. He was educated at Twyford School, before going up to Worcester College, Oxford. While studying at Oxford, he made two appearances in first-class cricket for Oxford University against Derbyshire in 1973 and Worcestershire in 1975. Playing as a wicket-keeper in the Oxford side, he scored 28 runs with a high score of 15.

After graduating from Oxford, Longmore became a sports journalist, with his first role being at The Cricketer in the early 1980s. He was chief sportswriter for the Independent on Sunday, before becoming a senior sportswriter at The Sunday Times in 2003, from which he retired in 2018. He won the Sports Journalists' Association Olympic/Paralympic Reporter category in 2000 for his coverage of the Summer Olympics, while in 2003 he won Feature Writer of the Year. He was the biographer for the jockey Kieren Fallon, writing his biography alongside Henrietta Knight. Longmore died in his sleep while on a walking holiday in the South of France in April 2019.
