= Ralph George Scott Bankes =

British judge (born 1900)

Ralph George Scott Bankes (24 October 1900 – 22 May 1948) was a British barrister and Diocesan Chancellor.

Bankes was born to Ralph Vincent Bankes and Ethel Georgina Mount (daughter of William George Mount M.P.). He was educated at Twyford School, Winchester College, and at Magdalen College, Oxford, where he graduated in 1923, and in 1927 was awarded an M.A.

He was admitted to the Inner Temple as barrister in 1924. He became Chancellor of the Diocese of Blackburn and Manchester in 1935, Coventry in 1937, and Durham in 1940. From 1941 to 1946, he was the acting Principal of the Ministry of Labour and National Service. On 15 November 1943 he was appointed Chairman of the Court of Quarter Sessions of the County of Flint, being Deputy Chairman since 1940.

From his time at Oxford in 1923 to his death, he was associated with The Working Men’s College, as benefactor, teacher, and member of College Council and the Executive Committee. He was a keen College sportsman with a passion for cricket, while being Chairman of the Playing Fields Committee. He died playing cricket at the Playing Fields.

Ralf George Scott Bankes never married.
