= Claude Sclater =

British naval officer and academic

Commander Claude Edward Lutley Sclater DSO and bar, FRGS, MA (24 January 1910, Odiham, Hampshire - 20 April 1986), was a British naval officer and, in later life, academic.

Sclater saw much action in World War II, mainly in destroyers, in several notable actions (Dunkirk evacuation, and Scharnhorst sinking during the Battle of the North Cape), and being decorated with the Distinguished Service Order and bar; the first award being for his command of the destroyer HMS Wild Swan during the action of 16 June 1942 in the Western Approaches, which resulted in her being sunk but not until after she had performed the remarkable feat of downing six out of the twelve Junkers Ju 88 dive bombers who were attacking her. After his retirement from the Navy, he was a senior member of the management staff at King's College, Cambridge.
