= Stanley J. Forrest =

Stanley John Forrest (18 February 1904 – 24 November 1977) was a Church of England priest and popular poet. He was a friend and collaborator of John Betjeman, who regarded him highly and contributed a foreword to What's the Use.

Known for his witty and often scathing poetry about the Anglican church and the life of its clergy, he would be more accurately described as a parodist, the poems frequently calling to mind a hymn or popular Gilbert & Sullivan aria. his many published collections suggest a prolific output, but often included poems published in previous collections. They were illustrated by his brother, Edward, who was also later ordained in the Anglican church.

His son, Dr Martin Forrest, wrote a memoir of his father in the Church Times published 27 Feb 2004, celebrating 100 years since his father's birth, which mentions work on a biography.

== Publications ==
- The Church in Reconstruction (Coelian Press, 1945), pamphlet
- Anglican Noah's Ark (Coelian Press, 1947), pamphlet
- Buzzards at Play (Privately published, 1947); pamphlet, in aid of St. Albans Diocesan Reconstruction Fund
- What the Vicar Likes (Privately published, 1952); pamphlet, in aid of the St. Albans Diocesan Seven Churches Campaign
- Time for a Rhyme (Mowbrays, 1954)
- What's the Use? (Mowbrays, 1955)
- Chapter and Verse (Mowbray, 1959)
- A Town Parson's Day (Mowbrays, 1960)
- Orders in Orbit (Mowbrays, 1962)
- Our Man at St. Withit's (Mowbrays, 1964)
- Verse from the Vestry (Mowbrays, 1966)
- Parson's Play-pen (Mowbrays, 1968)
- Saints and Sinods (Mowbrays, 1971)
- The Church Bizarre: Light Verse for Heavy Weather (Mowbrays, 1973)
