= Twyford, Hampshire =

Village and parish in Hampshire, England

Coordinates: 51.0218°N 1.3136°W

Twyford
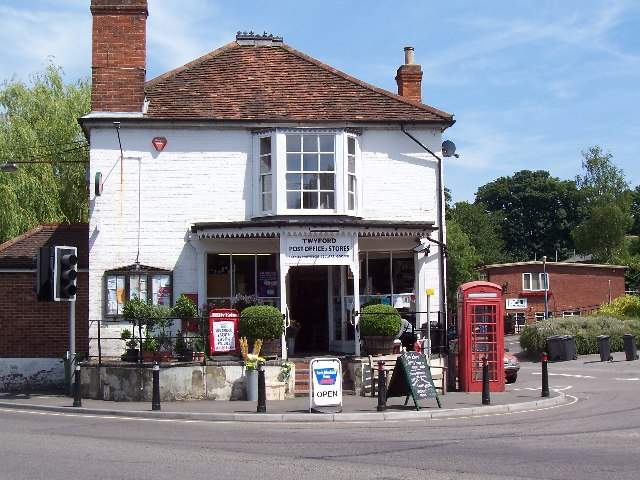
- Twyford Post Office and stores

- Location within Hampshire
- Population: 1,456; 1,589 (2011 Census)
- OS grid reference: SU482249
- Civil parish: Twyford
- District: City of Winchester
- Shire county: Hampshire
- Region: South East
- Country: England
- Sovereign state: United Kingdom
- Post town: WINCHESTER
- Postcode district: SO21
- Dialling code: 01962
- Police: Hampshire and Isle of Wight
- Fire: Hampshire and Isle of Wight
- Ambulance: South Central
- UK Parliament: Winchester (constituency)
- Website: Twyford Parish Council

Twyford is a village and civil parish in Hampshire, England, approximately three miles (4.8 kilometres) south of Winchester and near the M3 motorway and Twyford Down. In 2001, the population of the parish was 1,456. The village and parish are on the left bank of the Itchen, which passes through nearby watermeadows, and has been important economically for its residents.

== History ==
The name "Twyford" means "two fords" (Old English 'twifyrd'), which cross the River Itchen and was noted from as early as 963, being also mentioned in the 1086 Domesday Book as 'Tuiforde', belonging to the Bishop of Winchester and containing a church and six watermills.

In Thomas Moule's English Counties 1837 edition, Twyford is referred to as: "on the river Itchin [sic], 3 miles S. from the City of Winchester, contains 169 houses and 1048 inhabitants."

Shawford Park is a Grade II* listed country house, located in Twyford parish, on the river Itchen boundary with Compton and Shawford parish. It dates from 1685 and was originally the home of Sir Henry Mildmay and the Mildmay family. It was later owned by General Sir Charles Edward Frederick of the East India Company.

== Amenities ==
Twyford includes a village school, St. Mary's Primary School, St Mary's Church, a travel agency, a doctor's surgery and pharmacy, a grocer's shop and Post Office, a traditional clockmaker, two public houses, a social club, and other small businesses.

The village has three parks; Ballards Close, Hunters Park and Northfields Park, as well as many footpaths and large areas of water meadow which are held in trust or otherwise protected from building development.

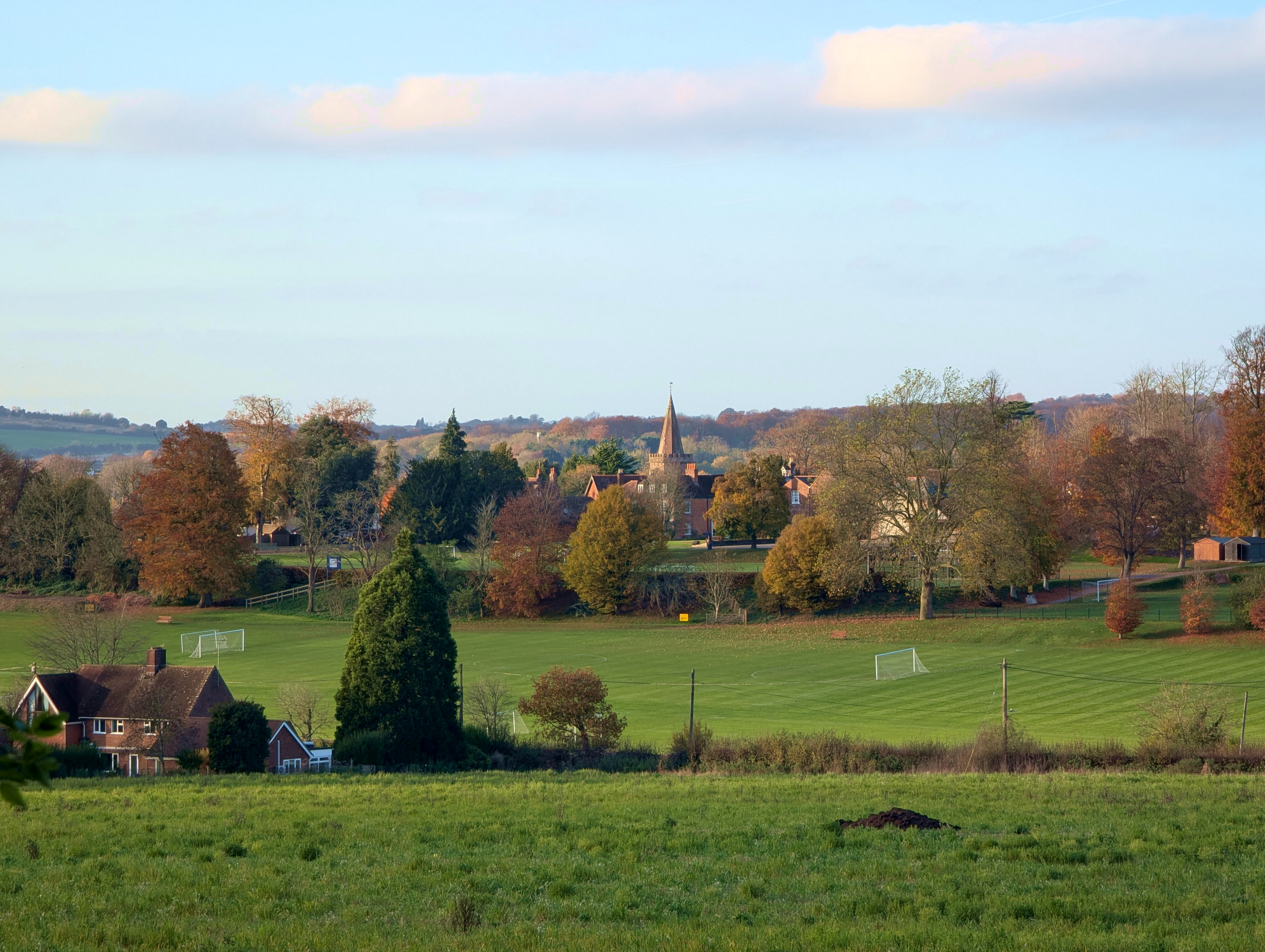
A view of the village of Twyford, Hampshire, England. November 2024.

Twyford School is a preparatory school in the centre of the village. Former pupils include poet Alexander Pope, who was expelled in the early 18th century for lampooning a master in verse.

Twyford Waterworks is a preserved pumping station and waterworks situated about 1 mile (1.6 km) to the east of the village. It is a scheduled monument and now operates as a museum.

== Demography ==
According to the 2001 UK census, the village has a population of 1,456 people, comprising 735 males and 721 females, living in 613 households. In 2001 there were twelve vacant dwellings in the parish, and the average household in Twyford had 6.40 rooms. 433 of these households were owner occupied, 105 were privately rented and 75 rented from the Council, housing association or registered social landlord. Housing in the parish consists of 241 detached houses or bungalows, 328 semi-detached or terraced houses or bungalows, and 61 flats, apartments, caravans or temporary structures.

== Transport ==
The B3335 road runs north-south through the village, linking with Junction 11 of the M3 Motorway to the north and the neighbouring village of Colden Common to the south. This road is called the High Street for the most of its route through the village; before completion of the M3 to the west it was the main A333 from Winchester to Portsmouth. In the centre of the village is a crossroads, where an unclassified road crosses the High Street. The west turn-off, Finches Road, becomes Shawford Road which runs through to the nearby village of Shawford before joining the main road from Winchester to Otterbourne. The east turn-off, Hazeley Road, travels past the Twyford Waterworks, to Hazeley Down and on towards Morestead and Owslebury.

The nearest rail station is Shawford railway station to the east. Twyford is served by several regular bus routes, operated by Bluestar (bus company) and Stagecoach Group among others, linking the village with Winchester, Eastleigh, Southampton and Fareham. The Monarch's Way long distance footpath passes through the village from east to west. The Itchen Way follows the western boundary.

== Geology ==
Twyford lies on the chalk at the northern edge of the Hampshire Basin, dipping south from the southern limb of the Winchester anticline. Successively younger layers of chalk are exposed from north to south, from Turonian New Pit Chalk in the Plague Pits Valley south of St. Catherine's Hill, the Lewes Nodular Chalk at Twyford Down, the Seaford Chalk under the village, to the Santonian or Campanian Newhaven Chalk to the south. In the Itchen valley to the west the chalk is overlain by alluvium and tufa deposits. The chalk is deeply incised by a series of dry valleys running south and west towards the Itchen.

== Twin towns ==
Twyford is twinned with:

- Saint-Pierre-Église, France

== See also ==
- Twyford Down
- Winchester
