= List of surviving Douglas C-47 Skytrains =

This is a list of surviving Douglas C-47 Skytrain and variant aircraft, including the C-53 Skytrooper, C-117 and R4D.

== Surviving aircraft ==
=== Argentina ===
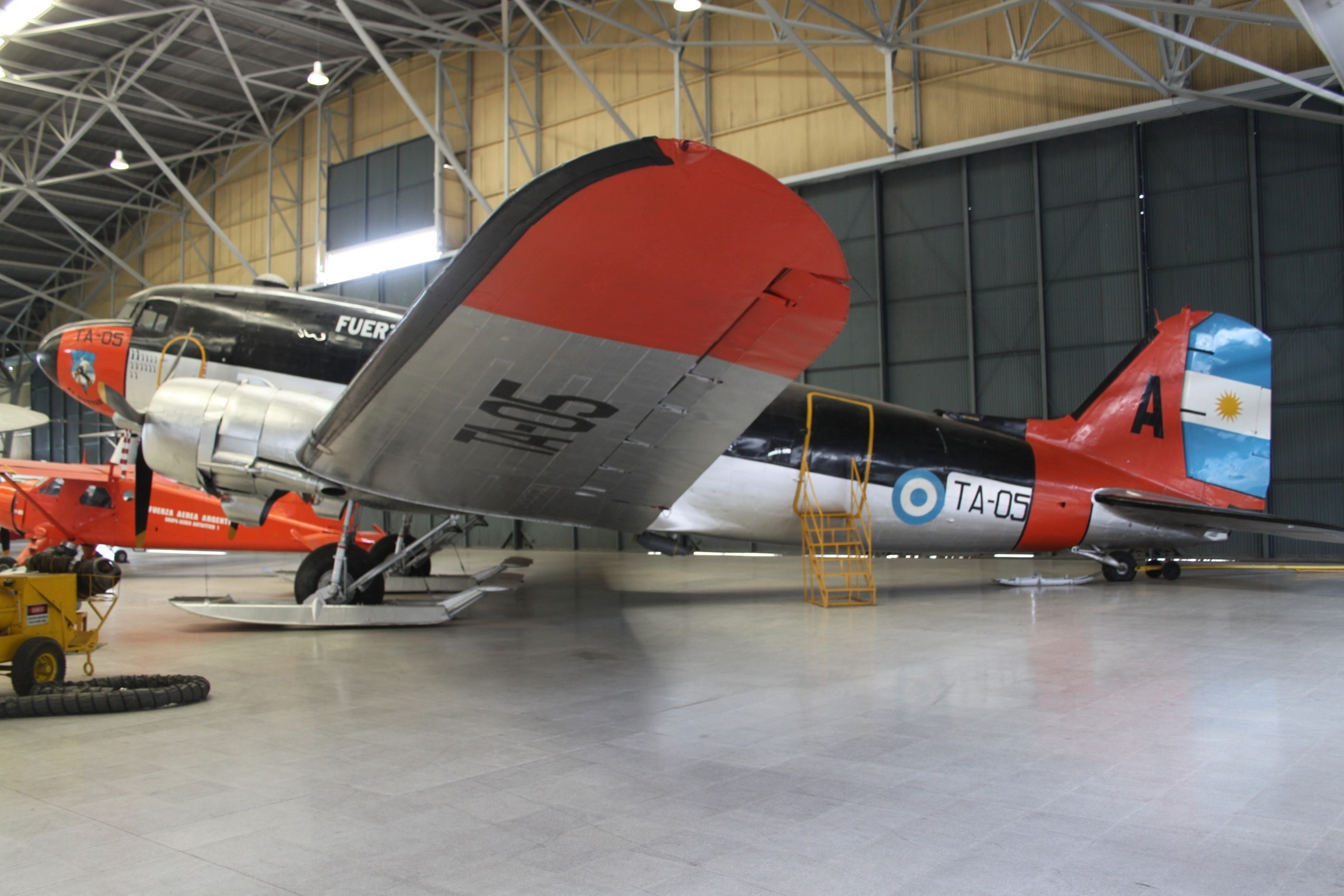
Douglas DC-3 TA-05

Airworthy

- 43-49533. LV-BEH, C-47B-15-DK c/n 15349/26794 - ex-Argentine Air Force TC-35, ex-United States Army Air Force 43-49533.

On display

- 41-18539. C-47-DL. CTA-15. At Museo de la Aviacion Naval, Bahia Blanca
- 42-23716. C-47A. Cape Horn 5-T-22. At Ushuia Aero club.
- 43-15327. C-47A-85-DL, ex-Argentine Air Force TC-33 on static display at the Museo Vicente "Tito" Churín in Baradero, Buenos Aires.
- 43-15499. TA-05, ex-Argentine Air Force, at Museo Nacional de Aeronáutica de Argentina, Morón, Buenos Aires. Used in flights to Antarctica.
- 43-48194. C-47A-30-DK c/n 25455/14010, ex-Argentine Air Force T-101, at Museo Nacional de Aeronáutica de Argentina. Displayed representing presidential transport LQ-GJT Independencia .
- 43‐48853. C-47B-5-DK, ex-Argentine Air Force T-103 and ex-SAAF6845. On static display at the Commercial Employees' Union campsite in Paraná, Entre Ríos.

=== Austria ===
On Display

- 42-93189. C-47A. N86U. Arizona Lady. First Austrian DC-3 Dakota Club.

=== Australia ===
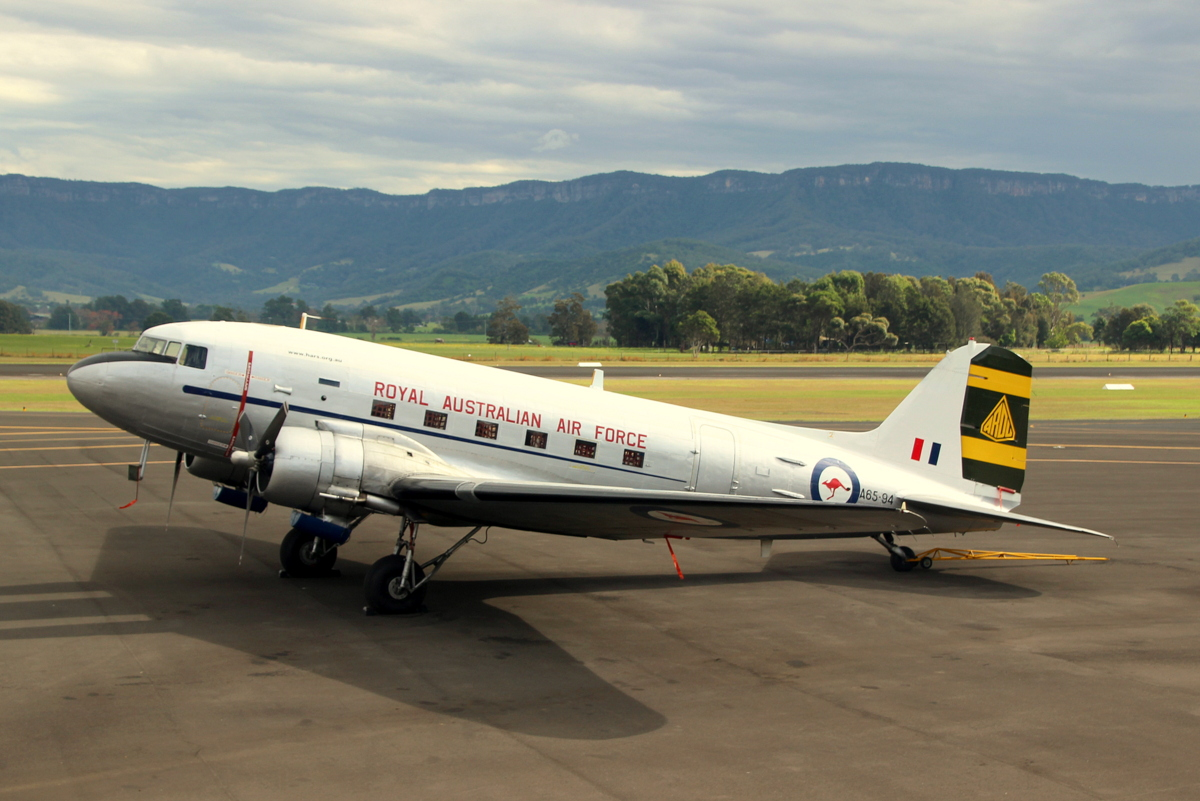
Historical Aircraft Restoration Society C-47B Dakota VH-EAF

==== Airworthy ====
- 41-18660 civil registration VH-AES; C-47-DL that operated inaugural flight of Trans Australia Airlines in 1946; in the collection of the Historical Aircraft Restoration Society (HARS) at Shellharbour Airport in Albion Park Rail, New South Wales.
- 42-23731 ex-Royal Australian Air Force (RAAF) A65-13, civil registration VH-MMA; C-47A commercially operated by Hardy Aviation based at Darwin International Airport in Darwin, Northern Territory.
- 44-76336 ex-RAAF A65-72, civil registration VH-AGU; C-47B flying as a privately owned warbird painted to represent an AC-47 Spooky; based at Latrobe Regional Airport in Victoria.
- 44-76552 ex-RAAF A65-91, civil registration VH-TMQ; C-47B commercially operated by Southern Cross Air Tours of Essendon Fields Airport, Melbourne, Victoria.
- 44-76764 ex-RAAF A65-95, civil registration VH-EAE; C-47B flying as a warbird in the collection of HARS at Shellharbour Airport in Albion Park Rail, New South Wales.
- 44-76770 ex-RAAF A65-98, civil registration VH-OVM — C-47B in commercial service with Shortstop Jet Charter, Essendon Fields Airport, Melbourne.
- 44-76774 ex-RAAF A65-94, civil registration VH-EAF; C-47B in the collection of the Historical Aircraft Restoration Society at Shellharbour Airport, operated as a warbird in colours it wore while in service with the Aircraft Research and Development Unit RAAF.
- 44-76803 ex-Royal New Zealand Air Force NZ3543, civil registration VH-X73; C-47B commercially operated by Gooney Bird Adventures based at Darwin International Airport in Darwin, Northern Territory.

==== On display ====
- 42-92199 ex-Royal Australian Navy (RAN) Fleet Air Arm (FAA) N2-23; C-47A on static display at a park in West Wyalong, New South Wales.
- 42-92711 ex-RAN FAA N2-43; C-47A modified with extended nose to house a radar system from a de Havilland Sea Venom; on static display in the Fleet Air Arm Museum at naval air station HMAS Albatross near Nowra, New South Wales.
- 42-93009 ex-Royal Australian Air Force (RAAF) A65-44; C-47A on display as VH-EAP of Qantas Empire Airways—its first civil registration and first operator following retirement from the RAAF—at the Qantas Founders Museum at Longreach Airport in Longreach, Queensland.
- 42-93199 ex-RAAF A65-49; C-47A on display with the false registration VH-EWE in Connellan Airways colours at the Central Australian Aviation Museum in Alice Springs, Northern Territory. The aircraft actually formerly registered VH-EWE is C-47 41-18646 located on private property near Karoonda, South Australia (see below).
- 43-48234; C-47A in the collection of HARS at Parkes Airport in Parkes, New South Wales.
- 44-49377 ex-Papua New Guinea Defence Force P2-003; C-47B on outdoor display at a pub in the town of Moree, New South Wales.
- 44-49379 ex-RAAF A65-64; C-47B on display mounted on poles outside the RSL Club premises at Mulwala in New South Wales.
- 44-76339 ex-RAAF A65-73; C-47B at the Far North Queensland Aviation Museum at Mareeba Airfield, Mareeba, Queensland; was used in the 1946 film The Overlanders and the 1998 film The Thin Red Line.
- 44-76547 ex RAAF A65-86; C-47B on static display at RAAF Amberley Aviation Heritage Center at RAAF Base Amberley in Amberley, Queensland.
- 44-76551 ex-RAN FAA N2-90; C-47B in the collection of HARS at Shellharbour Airport in Albion Park Rail, New South Wales.
- 44-76969 ex-RAAF A65-109; C-47B on static display at the Australian Aviation Museum at Trungley Hall near Temora, New South Wales.
- 44-77128 ex-RAAF A65-114; C-47B on static display at the South Australian Aviation Museum in Port Adelaide, South Australia.
- 45-0957 ex-RAAF A65-124; C-47B on static display at the Aviation Heritage Museum in Bull Creek, Western Australia.

==== In storage or on private property ====
Stored aircraft

- 44-49870 ex-Royal Australian Air Force (RAAF) A65-71; C-47B in storage at the Treloar Technology Centre of the Australian War Memorial in Mitchell, Australian Capital Territory.
- 44-76345 RAAF A65-78; C-47B in storage at the RAAF Museum at RAAF Williams in Point Cook, Victoria.

On private property

- 41-18646; C-47-DL under restoration to static display by Jeff Morgan at his farm near Karoonda, South Australia. It was previously displayed at a McDonald's in Adelaide.
- 42-93685, most recent former civil registration VH-ANW; C-47A located at a campground near Myalup, Western Australia. It was previously displayed at a McDonald's in Perth.
- 43-15575, most recent former civil registration PK-GDC; C-47A in use as bed and breakfast accommodation on a rural property near Amelup, Western Australia.
- 44-76965 ex-RAAF A65-108; C-47B located on a farm near Rupanyup, Victoria.

C-47-DL 41-18663, former civil registration VH-AEQ; C-47A 42-92274 ex-RAAF A65-29, last former civil registration VH-SBL; C-47A 42-93536, former civil registration VH-MIN; C-47B 43-48740 ex Papua New Guinea Defence Force (PNGDF) P2-005, former civil registration VH-PWN; C-47B 43-49869, ex PNGDF P2-004, former civil registration VH-DNA; C-47B 44-76777 ex PNGDF P2-001; and C-47B 44-76781 ex RAAF A65-102, last former civil registration VH-SPY; also survive on private properties.

=== Belgium ===
On Display

- K-16 – C-47B on static display at the Royal Museum of the Armed Forces and Military History in Brussels.
- K-1 registered as OT-CWA at the Open Air Museum of the 15th Wing next to its former base in Steenokkerzeel/Melsbroek.

=== Brazil ===
On Display

- 42-92496 C-47D. Ex-RAF, on display at a square in Canarana, Mato Grosso, with VACA (Viação Aérea Canarana) livery and registration PP-YPU.
- 43-15727 C-47A. Registration PP-AKA in replica FAB2017 colors on static display at Museu Aeroterrestre da Brigada de Infantaria Paraquedista in Rio de Janeiro.
- 43-16089 C-47A. Registration PP-AVJ painted with non-original Aerovias Brasil colors on display at Museu Aeroespacial in Rio de Janeiro.
- 43-48327 C-47B. Ex-Varig and used by then senator Juscelino Kubitschek. On display at a gas station in Garibaldi, Rio Grande do Sul. Registration PP-VBT.
- 43-48424 C-47B. Brazilian Air Force FAB2009 on display at Museu Aeroespacial in Rio de Janeiro.
- 43-49562 C-47B. Ex-Varig. On display at Museu Matarazzo with registration PP-VBK.
- 43-49660 C-47B. Airworthy, in Mococa, São Paulo, reg PP-VBN.
- 45-1018 C-47B. Ex-Vasp and nicknamed "Caparaó". Registration PT-KUB on display at Museu Catavento in São Paulo.

=== Canada ===
Airworthy

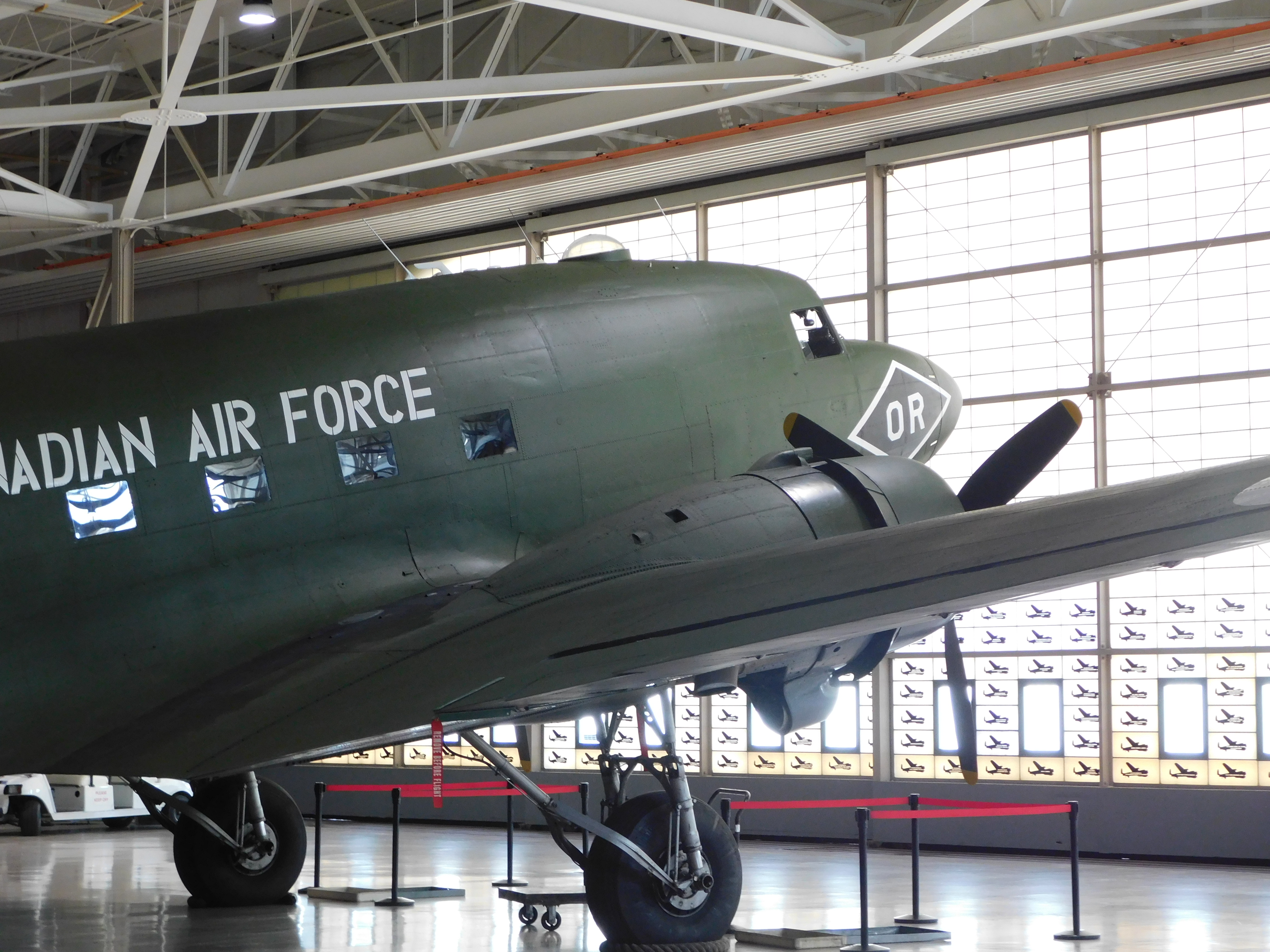
The Canadian Warplane Heritage Museum's C-47 in June 2023.

- 12913 – CC-129 airworthy with Buffalo Airways in Yellowknife, Northwest Territories.
- 12932 – CC-129 airworthy with Buffalo Airways in Yellowknife, Northwest Territories.
- 12945 – Dakota III airworthy at the Canadian Warplane Heritage Museum in Hamilton, Ontario.
- 42-93108 – C-47A airworthy with Buffalo Airways in Yellowknife, Northwest Territories.
- KG563 – Dakota III airworthy with Buffalo Airways in Yellowknife, Northwest Territories.

On Display

- 41-18471; C-47 on static display at the Reynolds-Alberta Museum in Wetaskiwin, Alberta.
- 42-56602; C-47 on display at spirit of Harbour Grace in Harbour Grace Newfoundland
- 42-92419; CC-129 on static display at the National Air Force Museum of Canada in Astra, Ontario.
- 42-108960; C-47A on static display at the Aero Space Museum of Calgary in Calgary, Alberta.
- 43-48052 ex Royal Canadian Air Force KG769; C-47A, flew around the world in 1986 as Spirit of Vancouver on "Odyssey'86" to mark Expo 86; on display at the KF Centre for Excellence aviation museum established by KF Aerospace at Kelowna International Airport in Kelowna, British Columbia.
- 44-76590; Dakota IV on static display at Greenwood Military Aviation Museum in Greenwood, Nova Scotia.

=== Chile ===
On Display

- 41-38731. C-47C at the El Tepual Airport in Puerto Montt, Los Lagos.
- 42-93131. C-47H at the Viña del Mar Airport in Viña del Mar, Valparaíso.
- 42-93390. C-47A at the Museo Nacional Aeronáutico y del Espacio, Los Cerillos Airport, Santiago.
- 43-15692. C-47A at the Museo Nacional Aeronáutico y del Espacio.
- 43-48854. C-47A at the Museo Nacional Aeronáutico y del Espacio.

On restoration process for display

- 43-49697. C-47B-20-DK, ex CC-CBW of Aerocor, Aerolíneas Cordillera. Parted-out, its nose was acquired by a private owner from Osorno, southern Chile for a possible restoration.

=== China ===
Airworthy

- 44-77113 – C-47A airworthy with International Air Services of Carson City, Nevada acting as trustee.

On display

- 42-92709 – C-47A on static display at the Flying Tigers Heritage Park in Guilin, Guangxi Zhuang.

=== Colombia ===
On Display

- 42-23324. C-47 A-1-DL. Air Colombia Villavicencio as HK 3293, Crashed and under restoration.
- 42-92066. C-47A-DK. HK 3349. On Display at Tiuma Park, Villavicencio.
- 43-49082. C-47B. Museo Aero Finix, Cali.
- FAC667. Colombian Aerospace Museum.

=== Czech Republic ===
On Display

- 41-18342 – C-47 in storage at Air Parc Zruc in Zruč-Senec, Plzeň.

=== Denmark ===
Airworthy

- 43-15553. C-47A-85DL. OY-BPB. Flying with DC-3 Vennerne

On Display

- 42-23802. C-47A. OY-DDA. Denmarks Tekniske Museum
- 42-100737. C-47A. K-687. Danmarks flymuseum, Stauning Airport

=== Ecuador ===
On Display

- 44-77164. C-47B. Quito Air Force Museum.

=== Ethiopia ===
On Display

- 42-23766. Dakota III. Registered to Ethiopian Airlines as ET-T-1. Is on display in front of Addis Ababa Bole International Airport next to the Ethiopian Airlines headquarters in Addis Ababa, Ethiopia.

=== Finland ===
Airworthy

- 43-2033 – C-53C OH-LCH with Airveteran Oy in Vantaa, Uusimaa (winters at Vaasa Airport).

On Display

- 43-48254 OH-LCF (DO-4) – C-47A at the Finnish Air Force Museum in Tikkakoski, Jyväskylä.
- 42-100846 OH-LCD (DO-8) — C-47A “Lokki” (‘Seagull’) at the Finnish Aviation Museum in Vantaa, Uusimaa.

=== France ===
Airworthy

- 42-23310. C-47-DL. F-AZTE. France DC 3.
- 44-77020. C-47B. F-AZOX Chalair. Un Dakota sur Normandie. Caen-Carpiquet Airport.
- 42-68810. C-53D. F-HVED Gruesome. Musee Aeronautique Bretagne

On Display

- 41-18487. C-47A. Lann-Bihoue air base
- 42-92449. C-47A. Musée Air Space. Le Bourget. Marked as 42-100558
- 42-93251. C-47A. La Ferte Alais Airfield. Also mentioned as 43-15101
- 42-93654. C -47-A. Ailes Anciennes. Toulouse
- 42-100825. C-47A on static display at the Airborne Museum in Sainte-Mère-Eglise, Manche. It is painted as 43-15159 The Argonia.
- 43-15073. C-47A on static display at the Merville Gun Battery in Merville-Franceville-Plage, Normandy. Saved from scrappers in Bosnia, she is now completely restored in her 1944 configuration.
- 44-76229. C-47B On display in Dinard.
- 44-76420. C-47B. L Epopee de lIndustrie et de lAeronautique, Albert.
- 44-77047. C-47B D-day Experience Museum. Dead Mans Corner. Saint Come du Mont, Manche. Painted as 42-92717. Used as simulator for visitors.
- 44-77116. C-47B. Musée de l'aéronautique navale, Rochefort-Soubise,

=== Germany ===
On Display

- 41-20058. C-53. Munich Airport.
- 42-68795. C-53. Technik Museum. Speyer
- 42-100997. C-47A. Flugausstellung Peter Junior. Hermeskeil
- 43-30729. C-47A. On Display in Fassberg. Painted as 43-15208
- 43-48189. C-47A. Auto & Technik Museum. Sinsheim.
- 43-49081. C-47B. Frankfurt Airport at Berlin Airlift Memorial.
- 43-49728. /14+01 – C-47B/Dakota IV on static display at the Deutsches Museum Flugwerft Schleissheim in Oberschleißheim, Bavaria.
- 43-49866. C-47B. ex-Royal Australian Air Force (RAAF) A65-69 – C-47B on static display at the Militärhistorisches Museum der Bundeswehr – Flugplatz Berlin-Gatow (Bundeswehr Museum of Military History – Berlin-Gatow Airfield) at the former RAF Gatow air base in Berlin; presented by the Australian government in 1980 to commemorate RAAF aircrews' role in the Berlin Airlift.
- 45-0951. C-47B. Berlin Technology Museum.

=== Greece ===
Airworthy

- 43-16008. C-47A. Hellenic Air Force.

On Display

- 43-48981. C-47B. Converted to a bar, in Athens.
- 43-48991. C-47A. Hellenic Air Force Museum. Tatoi.
- 43-49111. C-47B. Hellenic Air Force Museum. Tatoi.
- 43-49479. C-47B. KK 156. on static display at the Hellenic Air Force Museum located at Dekelia Air Base in Acharnes.
- 44-76874. C-47B. SX-ECF.

=== Hong Kong ===
On Display

- 41-18385. On display at Hong Kong Science Museum. Ex-Cathay Pacific "Betsy", registered VR-HDB.
- Unknown. On display outside Cathay City. As substitution for the lost Cathay Pacific "Niki".

=== Honduras ===
On Display

- 42-93701. C-47A. Honduran Aviation Museum.
- FAH-315. is also reported at Honduran Aviation Museum. Unknown USAAF nr.

41-18696 under restoration 26 June 2024 La Ceiba, Honduras.

=== Iceland ===
Airworthy

- 43-30710. C-47A. with Icelandair livery.

=== India ===
Airworthy

- 44-76488. C-47B. VP 905 - DC-3 part of Indian Air Force's vintage squadron.

On Display

- 43-15546. C-47A-85-DL airframe with c/n 20012 . Owned by Flytech Aviation Academy and is used for ground training at the Nadirgul airstrip . It was used in India as VT-DTS, and featured in the 1965 Bollywood murder mystery movie Gumnaam. It is featured on postage stamps.

=== Indonesia ===
On Display

- 42-23688. C-47A on display in Lembaga Kesehatan Penerbangan dan Ruang Angkasa, South Jakarta, Jakarta.
- 42-93424. C-47A on display as RI-001 "Seulawah" in Taman Mini Indonesia Indah, East Jakarta, Jakarta.
- 43-15157. C-47A on display at Garuda Indonesia HQ, Soekarno-Hatta International Airport, Tangerang, Banten.
- 45-0965. C-47B on display as RI-001 "Seulawah" in Satriamandala Museum, South Jakarta, Jakarta.

=== Israel ===
On Display

- 42-5635. C-47-DL. At Ramon Airport.
- 44-76505. C-47B. Mitspeh Revivim Museum in the Negev.
- 44-76975. C-47B-35-DK. At Israeli Air Force Museum at Hatzerim AFB, Beersheba.

=== Italy ===
On Display

- 41-7774. C -47-DL. Museo Storico.
- 42-92834. C-47A. Parco Tematico dell' Aviazione. Rimini
- 42-100731. MM61776 - C47B on static display at Italian Air Force Museum, Vigna di Valle
- 43-48983. C-47B on static display at Volandia in Somma Lombardo, Varese.

=== Malta ===
On Display

- 43-15762 – C-47A in storage at the Malta Aviation Museum in Ta' Qali, Attard.
- 44-76603 – C-47B under restoration at the Malta Aviation Museum in Ta' Qali, Attard.

=== Netherlands ===
On Display

- 42-23936. C-47A. On display in the War Museum in Overloon, since December 2017. Ex G-DAKK.
- 42-23974. C-47A. De Vliegende Hollander/The Flying Dutchman 'PH-TCB'. At Aviodrome museum.
- 43-2022. C-53C. Darlin Dorien. Wings of Liberation Museum. Painted as '290321', which could be read as a military serial (42-90321), but reflects the owner's birthday.
- 43-15288. C-47A. Doornroosje At Aviodrome museum. Formerly part of the Dutch Dakota Association. Disassembled and stored since 2016, awaiting restoration.
- 43-15652. T-443 – ex-RDAF K-688', c/n 20118 - C-47B on display at the Nationaal Militair Museum, Soesterberg .
- 44-19434 / 42-100971. C-47A Prinses Amalia in operation, formerly part of the Dutch Dakota Association fleet. DDA has since stopped operations and Princess Amalia was sold for preservation in airworthy condition at Aviodrome, Lelystad Airport (ICAO: EHLE) for the nominal sum of €1,- (one Euro). She was flown to Lelystad on 17 December 2024. On 24 October 2025 Aviodrome confirmed it will remain grounded and join the museum collection.
- 44-76634. C-47B. At Aviodrome museum as 'PH-ALR' in orange livery until 2010. Then moved to former Naval Air Station Valkenburg and used as a prop in the Soldier of Orange musical.
- 44-76900. C-47B. On display at Madurodam as De Vliegende Hollander/The Flying Dutchman 'PH-APM'. Ex N213GB.

On Display (partial airframes) C-47B

- 43-48266. C-47B. (Only Cockpit) Wings of Liberation Museum.

=== New Zealand ===
Airworthy

- 43-49219. C-47B-10-DK. ZK-DAK. NZ Warbirds DC-3 Syndicate, Ardmore Airport.

On Display

- 42-93410. ex-US Navy BuNo 17221 – LC-47H on static display in the collection of the Ferrymead Aeronautical Society at the Ferrymead Heritage Park in Christchurch.
- 42-93579. C-47A. ZK-AMY. Formerly owned by Southern DC-3 trust. At Ashburton Aviation Museum.
- 42-100460 – C-47A on static display at a McDonald's in Taupo.
- 43-15585. C-47A. ZK-BYF. Gisborne Aviation Museum.
- 44-76983. C-47B-35DK. ZK-BQK. Former RNZAF NZ3544 1945–1952, written off, sold by tender to National Airways Corporation of NZ and rebuilt. In service 1956–1969. Leased to Polynesian Airways as 5W-FAH 1969–1970. Presented to the Museum of Transport and Technology (MOTAT) by NAC 1973. Presented in NAC Skyliner colours.
- 45-0960. C-47B. NZ3551 – C-47B on static display at the Air Force Museum of New Zealand in Christchurch.

=== Norway ===
Airworthy

- 42-68823 C-53D-DO. Little Egypt. Flying with Dakota Norway.

On Display

- 42-93797. C-47A-25-DK. Flysamlingen Forsvarets museum, Oslo.

=== Pakistan ===
- 41-18470 On display as coffee shop at Shangrila Resort, Skardu.

=== Papua New Guinea ===
On display

- 42-24138 ex-Royal Australian Air Force (RAAF) A65-18; C-47A displayed outdoors at Port Moresby International Airport.
- 43-49849 ex-Royal Air Force KN241; C-47B used as the personal aircraft of Field Marshal Bernard Montgomery during World War II; on display as P2-ANQ of Air Niugini—its last civil registration and its last civil operator—outside the airline's headquarters at the entrance to Port Moresby International Airport.
- 44-76545 ex-Papua New Guinea Defence Force P2-002; C-47B displayed outdoors at the Airways Hotel near Port Moresby International Airport.
- 44-77123 ex-RAAF A65-122; C-47B displayed outdoors at the National Botanic Gardens in Lae.

=== Philippines ===
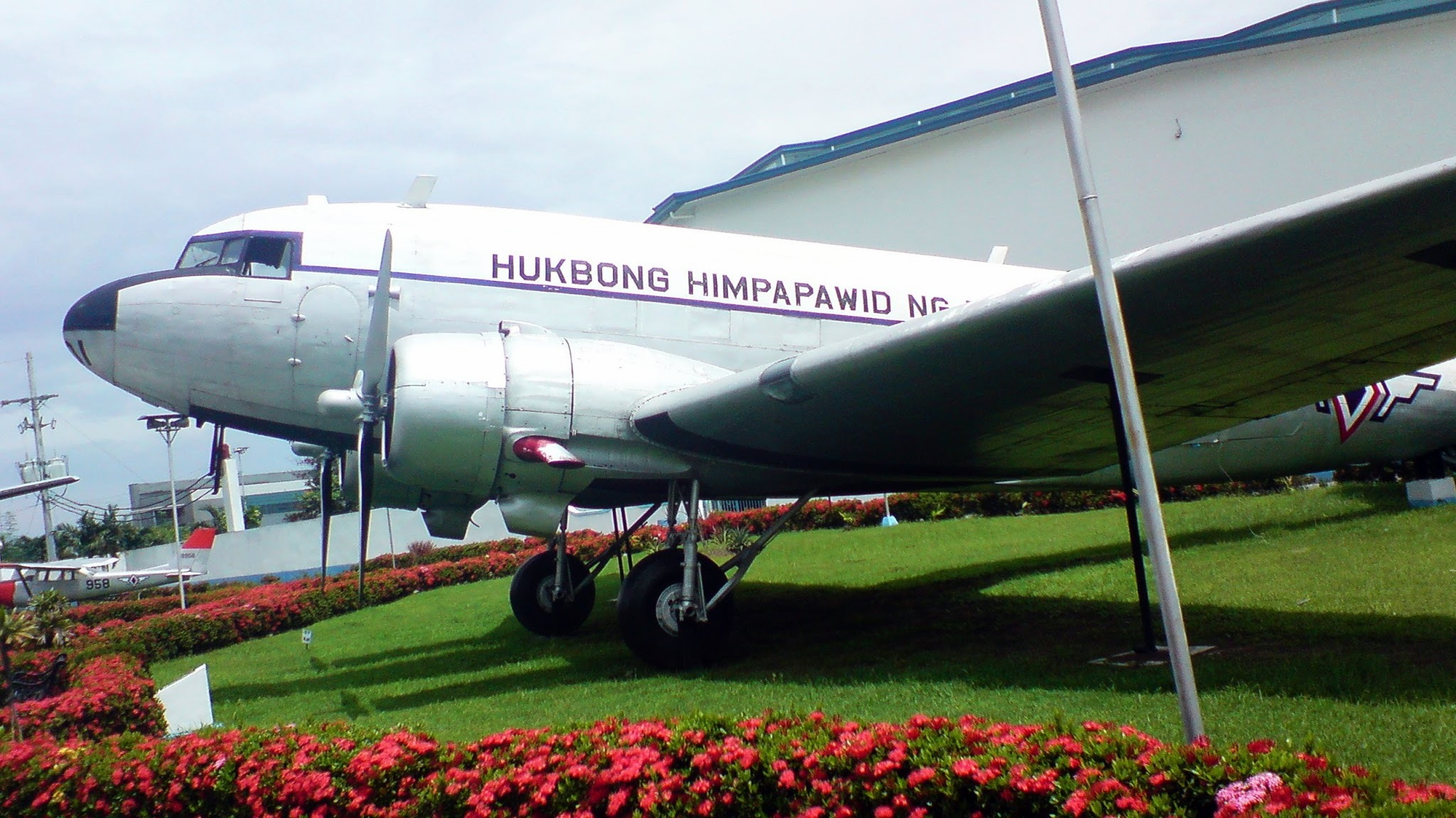
A C-47 on static display at Philippine Air Force Aerospace museum.

- 48301. On static display at Philippine Air Force Aerospace Museum at Metro Manila.

=== Portugal ===
On Display

- 43-15037. C-47A. Museo Do Air. Lisabon.
- 43-15289. C-47A Museo D ar. Sintra.

=== Russia ===
Airworthy

- 42-24173. C-47A. N12BA. UMMC Museum Complex

=== Serbia ===
On Display

- 44-76888 – C-47B on static display at the Aeronautical Museum Belgrade in Surčin, Belgrade.

=== Slovenia ===
On Display

- 43-48199. C-47A. On Display in Otok, Metlika.

=== South Africa ===
- 6832 – Dakota IIIA on display at the South African Air Force Museum at Air Force Base Ysterplaat.
- 6859 – C-47 on display at the South African Air Force Museum at Air Force Base Swartkop.

=== South Korea ===
On Display

- 42-93704. C-47A. Korean Aerospace Industry Museum.
- 43-15737. C-47A. Inha University. Incheon.
- 26831/15386. EC-47Q. Yeouido Park. Seoul.

=== Spain ===
On Display

- 41-18417. C-47-DL. At Son Bonet Airport. Mallorca
- 43-16134. C-47B. Museo de Aeronautica, Madrid
- 45-1091. C-47B. Malaga Aeronautico Museum. Painted as Iberia.
- 43-49719. C-47B. Served in the USAF, RAF and in several airlines. On display at the Aeronautical Museum of Catalonia (Sabadell Airport).

=== Sri Lanka ===
On Display

- 43-48203. C-47A. Sri Lanka Air Force Museum.

=== Sweden ===
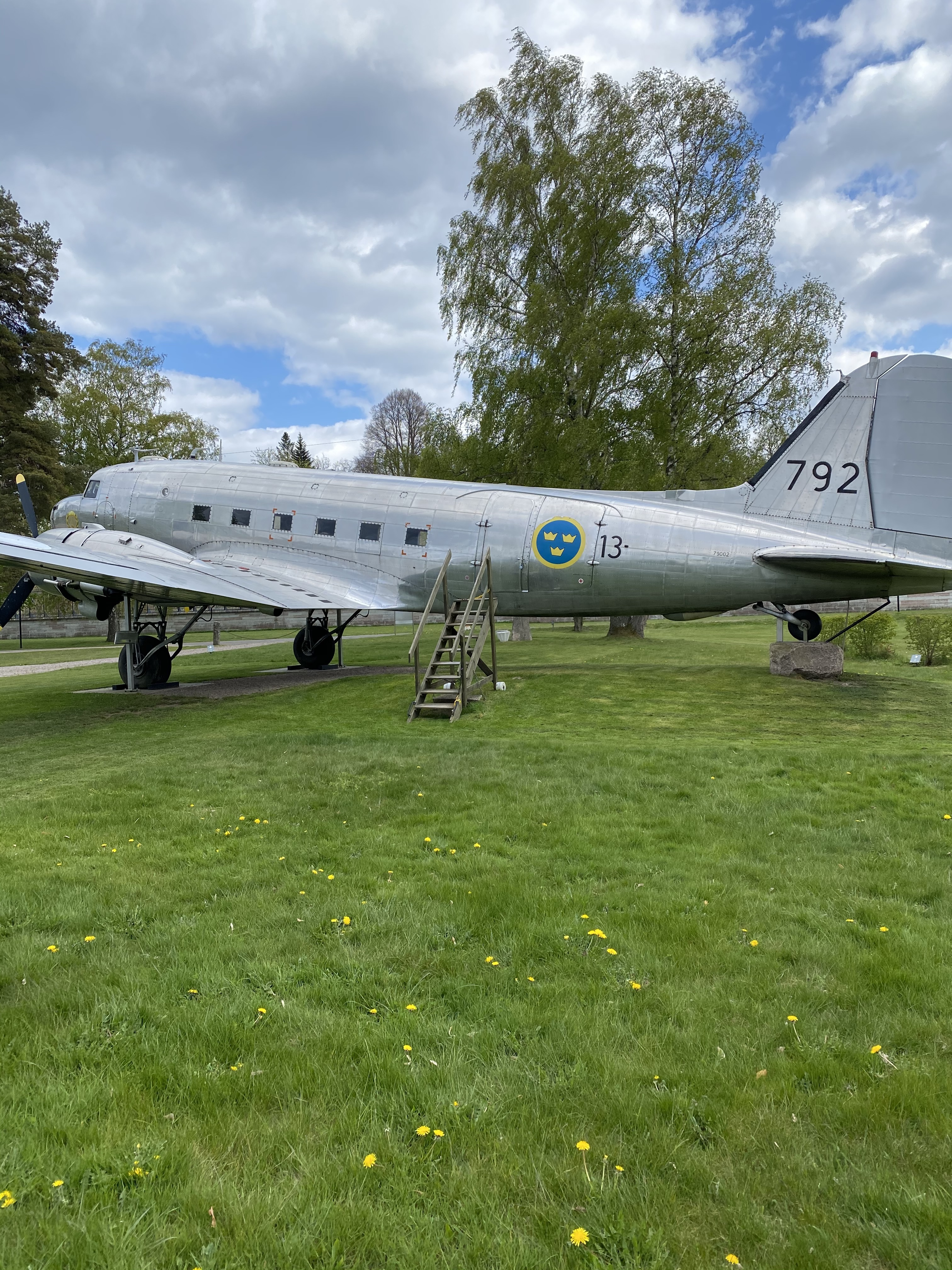
C-47 on display at the Swedish Airborne Camp

Airworthy

- 43-30732. Served in the Swedish Air Force as 79006. Today still flying with the society Flygande Veteraner under the name "Daisy"

On Display

- Wreckage of 42-5694 on display at the Swedish Air Force Museum in Linköping. The plane last served as TP 79 001 in the Swedish Air Force and was shot down over the Baltic Sea by the Soviet Union while on mission to gather signal-intelligence for the National Defence Radio Establishment (Sweden) in June 1952. The wreckage was discovered in 2003 and recovered in 2004. Exhibited at the museum since 2010.
- 42-32877. on static display in Karlsborg Sweden at the Swedish Airborne Camp. This plane also served in the Swedish Air Force, as 79002, with signal-intelligence, like 79001 above. Today restored as a Swedish Airborne aircraft from the 60s. It participated in all major Allied Parachute Missions from the Invasion of Sicilly July 1943 over the D-day until Operation Market-Garden in Holland September 1944.
- 42-93706. exhibited outside the Swedish Air Force Museum in Linköping. The aircraft served as TP 79 007 in the Swedish Air Force between 1960 and 1982. After Second World War in civilian service in Det Norske Luftselskap in Norway until 1948. In Swedish civilian service 1948–1957 with Scandinavian Airlines and 1957–1960 in Linjeflyg.
- 42-24049. On display at a shopping center in Norrtälje, Sweden.

=== Switzerland ===
Airworthy

- 41-18401. C-47-DL. Painted as 43-15087. N 150 D. Owned by Hugo Mathys.
- 41-18542. (or 18541, not confirmed info) C-47-DL. HB-ISB. Classic air. Operated by Classic Air.
- 42-24133. C-47A-45DL. NH 431 HM. Painted as Swissair. Owned by Hugo Mathys.

On Display

- 44-77061. C-47B. Swiss Museum of transport.

=== Taiwan ===
On Display

- 42-93674. C-47A. At Chung Cheng Aviation Museum. Museum is closed. Removed to an airbase.

=== Thailand ===
On Display

- 42-92972 C-47A. Hope International Rehabilitation Centre, Si Racha.
- 42-108840 C-47A. At Chiang Mai Air Force Museum.
- 43-49213 C-47B. On U-Tapao Beach near U-Tapao International Airport.
- 43-49703 EC-47P. Ripley's Believe It or Not!, Royal Garden Plaza mall, Pattaya.
- 43-49919 C-47A. The Camp Flea Market, Bangkok.

=== Turkey ===
On Display

- 42-100510. C-47A. Anadolu University Vecihi Hürkuş Aviation Park
- 43-49195. C-47A. At Istanbul Air Force Museum.
- 43-15063. C-47A. Ankara Aviation Museum.

=== United Kingdom ===
Airworthy

- 40-0070. C-41-A. N 341A. Aerotechnics Aviation Inc, Tewkesbury.
- 42-24338/ZA947 – C-47A/Dakota 3 During the Second World War this aircraft served entirely in Canada. It is airworthy and forms part of the BBMF. It was originally given the serial number KG661 and served with the Royal Aircraft Establishment, but in the late 1970s it was realised that the serial number KG661 had, in fact, previously been allocated to another Dakota which had been destroyed in an accident. The error was reported and in July 1979 the Dakota was allocated the 'modern' serial ZA947, which explains why this serial does not match the age or era of the aircraft.
- 42-100882. C-47A. Drag em oot. Aero Legends UK.
- 42-100884. C-47A. Mayfly. Flying with Aces High
- 43-49308. C-47B. G-AMPY. RVL Aviation.
- 44-77104. C-47B. G-ANAF. RVL Aviation.

On Display

- 42-92648. Just a part of the body, at RAF Museum, London.
- 42-100521. Night Fright. Under restoration.
- 43-15509. Imperial War Museum. Duxford
- 43-49240. C-47B. Lilly Belle 2. Wings Museum, Balcombe. With Nose from 42 to 100611. Without Wings.
- 44-76384/KN353 – C-47B/Dakota IV on display in taxiable condition at the Yorkshire Air Museum in Elvington, York.
- 44-77003/KN645 – C-47B/Dakota IV on static display at the Royal Air Force Museum Cosford in Cosford, Shropshire.
- 44-77087. C-47B. Merville Barracks, Colchester.

=== United States ===
==== Airworthy ====
C-47

- 42-24064 Placid Lassie – Tunison Foundation
- 42-32832 Sky King – Mid America Flight Museum in Mount Pleasant, Texas.

C-47A/Dakota III

- 42-23518 Old Number 30 – Airbase Arizona of the Commemorative Air Force in Mesa, Arizona.
- 42-23668 – Yanks Air Museum in Chino, California.
- 42-92277/FL633 – WWII Airborne Demonstration Team in Frederick, Oklahoma.
- 42-92847 That's All---Brother – restored to airworthy status at Basler Turbo Conversions in Oshkosh, Wisconsin; for the Commemorative Air Force. This airframe was the lead aircraft, after the Pathfinders, for the D-Day invasion and took its first flight in many years on 31 January 2018.
- 42-100591 Tico Belle – Valiant Air Command Warbird Museum in Titusville, Florida.
- 42-100857 – Elmendorf Air Force Base in Anchorage, Alaska.
- 42-100931 Flagship Orange County – Lyon Air Museum in Santa Ana, California. This airframe is painted in a civilian scheme.
- 43-15211 – Fantasy of Flight in Polk City, Florida.
- 43-15679 – War Eagles Air Museum in Santa Teresa, New Mexico. This airframe is painted in a civilian scheme.
- 43-15731 – Museum of Mountain Flying in Missoula, Montana.
- 43-30652 Whiskey 7 – National Warplane Museum in Geneseo, New York. This aircraft was a lead plane in Mission Boston during the airborne invasion of Normandy during D-Day.
- 43-48080 – Avionics Engineering Center of Ohio University in Albany, Ohio. It is painted in a civilian scheme.

C-47B/R4D-6

- 43-16369 – American Flight Museum in Topeka, Kansas. Restored to replicate a AC-47.
- 43-48608 Betsy's Biscuit Bomber – Estrella Warbirds Museum in Paso Robles, California.
- 43-48716 Luck of the Irish – Air Heritage Aviation Museum in Beaver Falls, Pennsylvania.
- 50783 Ready 4 Duty – Dallas/Fort Worth Wing of the Commemorative Air Force in Lancaster, Texas.
- 50819 – Mid-Atlantic Air Museum in Reading, Pennsylvania.
- 50829 – Fargo Air Museum in Fargo, North Dakota.
- 44-76423 What's Up Doc? – Palm Springs Air Museum in Palm Springs, California.
- 44-76717 Second Chance – American Airpower Museum in Farmingdale, New York.
- 44-76791 Willa Dean – Lyon Air Museum in Santa Ana, California.

TC-47D

- 44-76716 – Yankee Air Museum in Belleville, Michigan.

TC-47K

- 99854 Black Sparrow – Basler Turbo Conversions in Oshkosh, Wisconsin. Formerly operated by the Headquarters Squadron of the Commemorative Air Force.

R4D-7 BuNo 99856 SN 33359 former FAA flight check N34 aircraft seen at many airshows from 1987 until 2012. Placed in flyable storage in 2014. Now on public display at the Texas Air & Space Museum in Amarillo TX. (The aircraft was built in May 1945 as a USAAF TC-47B, S/N 45-77027 but upon completion redesignated as a R4D-7) C-53D

- 41-20095 Beach City Baby – This airframe was previously used by the state of Ohio as the governor's aircraft before being put on display at the United States Air Force Museum in Dayton, Ohio. The Aircraft underwent a lengthy restoration in Franklin, Pennsylvania before making its first post-restoration flight on May 14, 2022 and has since joined the airshow circuit.
- 42-68830 D-Day Doll – Inland Empire Wing of the Commemorative Air Force in Riverside, California.

==== On display (complete airframes) ====
C-47

- 41-7723 – Pima Air & Space Museum in Tucson, Arizona.
- 41-18482 – Museum of Alaska Transportation & Industry in Wasilla, Alaska.

C-47A/R4D-5

- 17217 – Pueblo Weisbrod Aircraft Museum in Pueblo, Colorado.
- 42-23414 – Stonehenge Air Museum in Fortine, Montana.
- 42-92838 – Joe B. Barnes Regional Park in Oklahoma City, Oklahoma.
- 42-92841 Turf and Sport Special – Air Mobility Command Museum in Dover, Delaware.
- 42-92990 Okie Dokie – Travis Air Force Base Heritage Center in Fairfield, California.

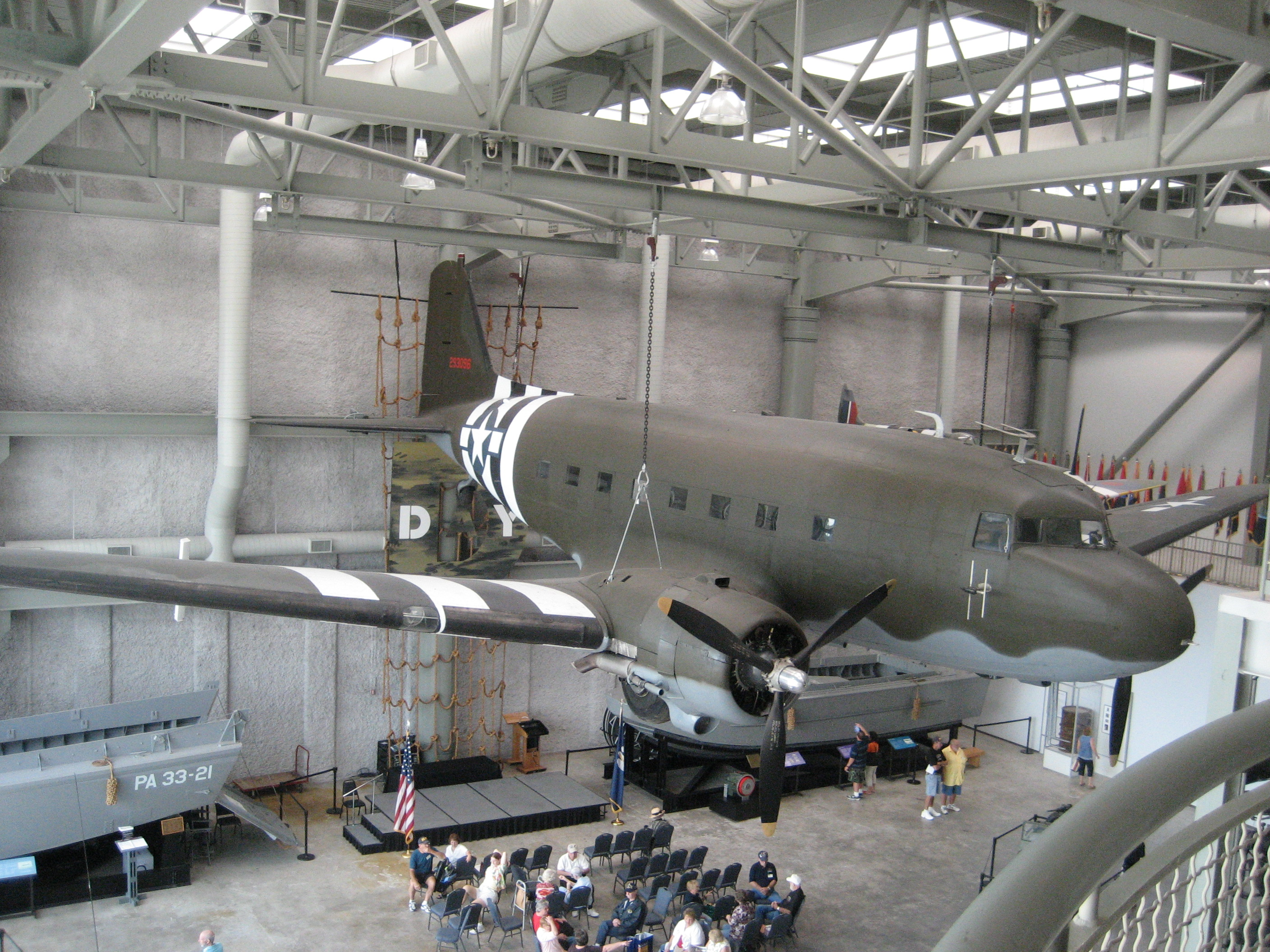
C-47 on display at the National World War II Museum

- 42-93096 – National World War II Museum in New Orleans, Louisiana.
- 42-93168 – Air Zoo in Kalamazoo, Michigan.
- 42-100486 Cheeky Charlie – Pacific Aviation Museum in Honolulu, Hawaii.
- 42-100828 – Fort Campbell near Clarksville, Tennessee. This airframe was previously operated by the Air Acres Museum in Woodstock, Georgia.
- 42-108798/17096 Brass Hat – Don F. Pratt Museum at Fort Campbell near Clarksville, Tennessee.
- 42-108808/17106 – Dyess Linear Air Park at Dyess Air Force Base in Abilene, Texas.
- 43-15510 – Air Commando Park at Hurlburt Field in Mary Esther, Florida. This airframe is painted as an AC-47D.
- 43-15635 Old 635 – National Museum of Transportation in Kirkwood, Missouri.
- 43-15977 Seventh Heaven – Castle Air Museum in Atwater, California.
- 43-16130 Hi Honey! – Barksdale Global Power Museum in Bossier City, Louisiana.
- 43-48098 – Strategic Air Command & Aerospace Museum in Ashland, Nebraska.

VC-47A

- 42-93800 – Eagles Air Museum in West Fargo, North Dakota.

C-47B

- 43-48362 – Fantasy of Flight in Polk City, Florida.
- 43-48415 – Kelly Field Annex in San Antonio, Texas.
- 43-48459 – Champaign Aviation Museum in Urbana, Ohio.
- 43-48932 – 82nd Airborne Division War Memorial Museum in Fayetteville, North Carolina.
- 43-49206 – Altus Air Force Base near Altus, Oklahoma.
- 43-49270 – Grissom Air Museum in Peru, Indiana.
- 43-49355 – Charleston Air Force Base Air Park in North Charleston, South Carolina.
- 43-49442 – Museum of Aviation in Warner Robins, Georgia.
- 43-49526 – Fairchild Air Force Base near Airway Heights, Washington.
- 45-0928 – MAPS Air Museum in North Canton, Ohio.

R4D-6

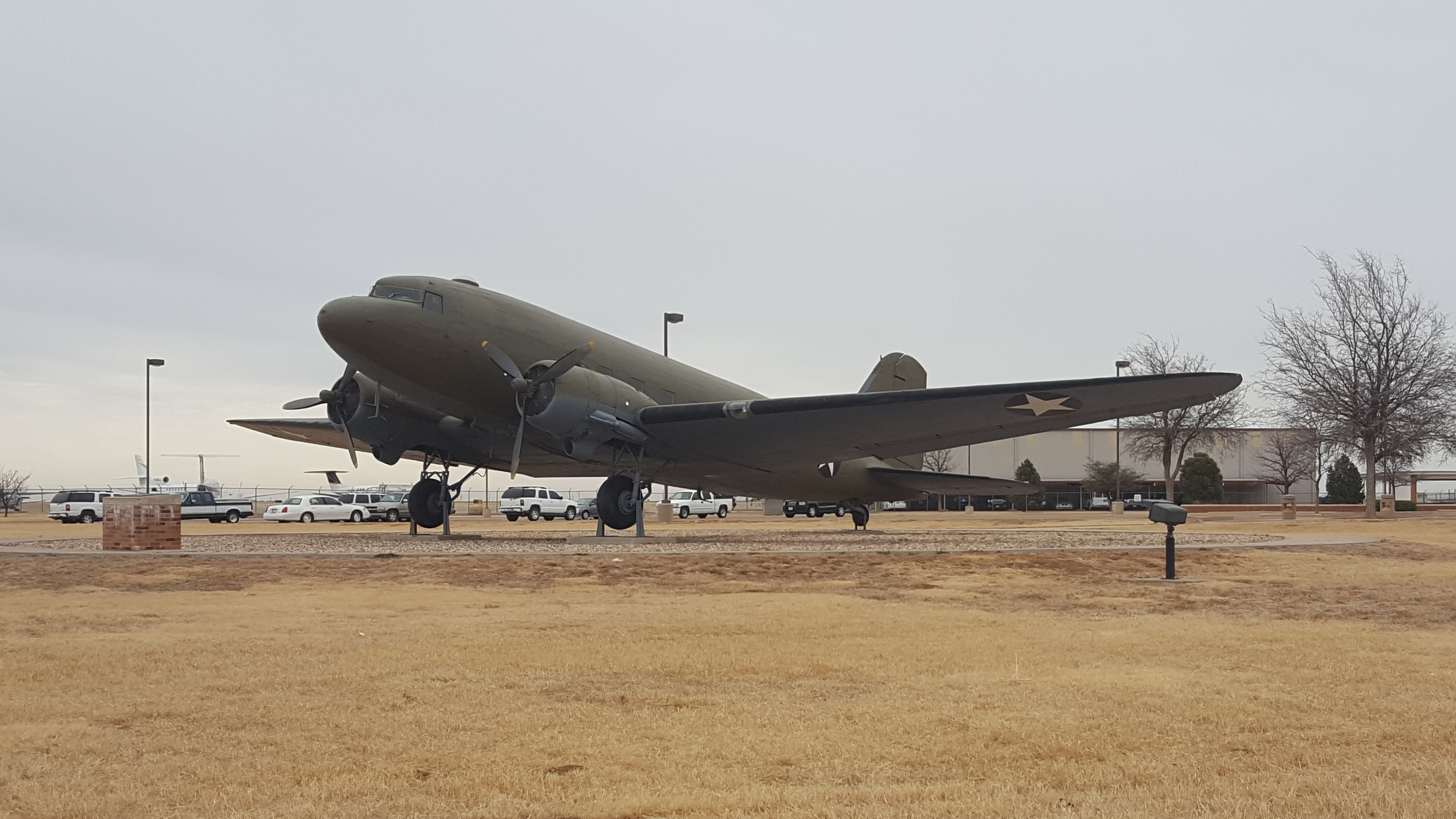
R4D-6 on display at the Silent Wings Museum.

- 17278 – Silent Wings Museum in Lubbock, Texas.
- 50761 – Charles B. Hall Airpark at Tinker Air Force Base near Midwest City, Oklahoma.
- 50779 – Gunter Annex in Montgomery, Alabama.
- 50793 – Minnesota Air National Guard Museum in St. Paul, Minnesota.
- 150190 – Niagara Falls Air Reserve Station near Niagara Falls, New York. This airframe was previously on display at the Museum of Aviation in Warner Robins, Georgia.

VC-47D

- 43-49281 – Hill Aerospace Museum in Roy, Utah.
- 44-76326 – Battleship Memorial Park in Mobile, Alabama.
- 44-76582 Kilroy is Here – Combat Air Museum in Topeka, Kansas.

C-47D

- 43-49507 – National Museum of the United States Air Force in Dayton, Ohio. It is painted as C-47A, 43–15174; an airframe that crashed in Germany on 24 April 1945.

TC-47D

- 44-76502 – McChord Air Museum in Lakewood, Washington.

C-47H

- 42-93127 – South Dakota Air and Space Museum in Box Elder, South Dakota.

C-47K

- 44-76486 – Air Force Armament Museum at Eglin Air Force Base in Valparaiso, Florida. This airframe is painted as an AC-47.

R4D-3

- 5075 – Museum of Flying in Santa Monica, California.

C-53D

- 42-68835 – Aerospace Museum of California in McClellan, California.

C-117C

- 42-108866 – Goodfellow Air Force Base in San Angelo, Texas. This airframe was previously on display at the Pate Museum of Transportation in Cresson, Texas.

C-117D

- 50826 – Pima Air & Space Museum in Tucson, Arizona.

==== On display (partial airframes) ====
C-47A

- 43-15912 (Cockpit Only) – San Diego Air & Space Museum in San Diego, California.

==== Under restoration or in storage (complete airframes) ====
C-47A/Dakota III

- KG587 – under restoration to airworthy at Classic Aircraft Aviation Museum in Hillsboro, Oregon.

C-47B

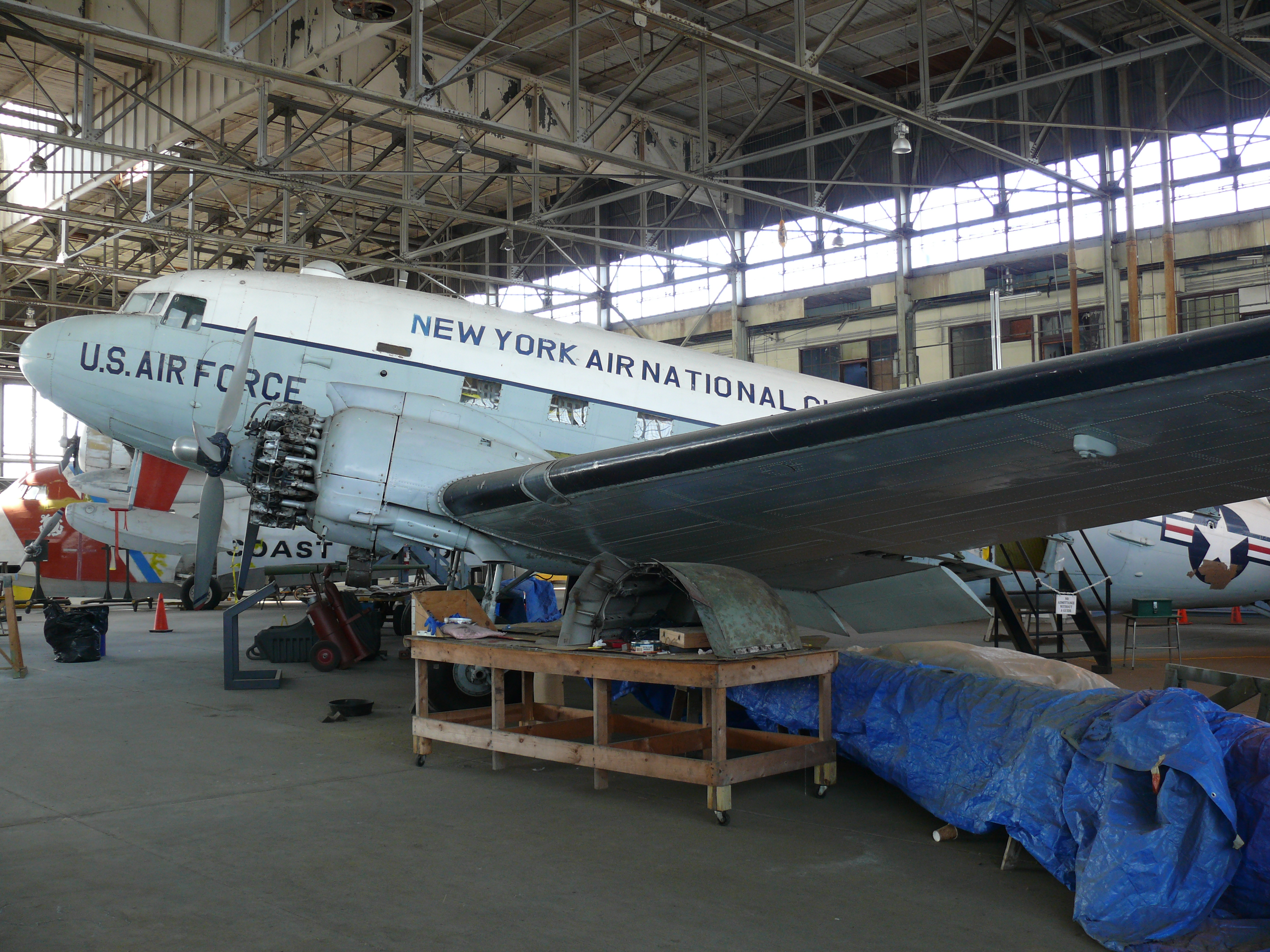
C-47B 44-76457 at Floyd Bennett Field in New York, New York.

- 43-16141 – in storage at Burlington Air National Guard Base in South Burlington, Vermont.
- 44-76457 – under restoration at the Historic Aircraft Restoration Project in New York, New York.

C-53D

- 42-68710 – under restoration to airworthy with Saving Lulu Belle, Inc. in Fremont, Ohio.

C-53DO

- 41-20130 – under full static restoration at North Carolina Transportation Museum in Spencer, NC.

=== Uruguay ===
On Display

- 42-100768 – C-47A on static display at the Colonel Jaime Meregalli Aeronautical Museum in Ciudad de la Costa, Canelones.
- 44-77060 – C-47B on static display at the Colonel Jaime Meregalli Aeronautical Museum in Ciudad de la Costa, Canelones.
