= HK1 (disambiguation) =

HK1 is an enzyme.

HK1 or HK-1 may also refer to:

- HK-1, the original designation of the aircraft Hughes H-4 Hercules
- Heinonen HK-1, a Finnish sport aircraft
- Kimura HK-1, a Japanese experimental aircraft
