= Kaivopuisto Air Show =

Finnish centenary aviation event

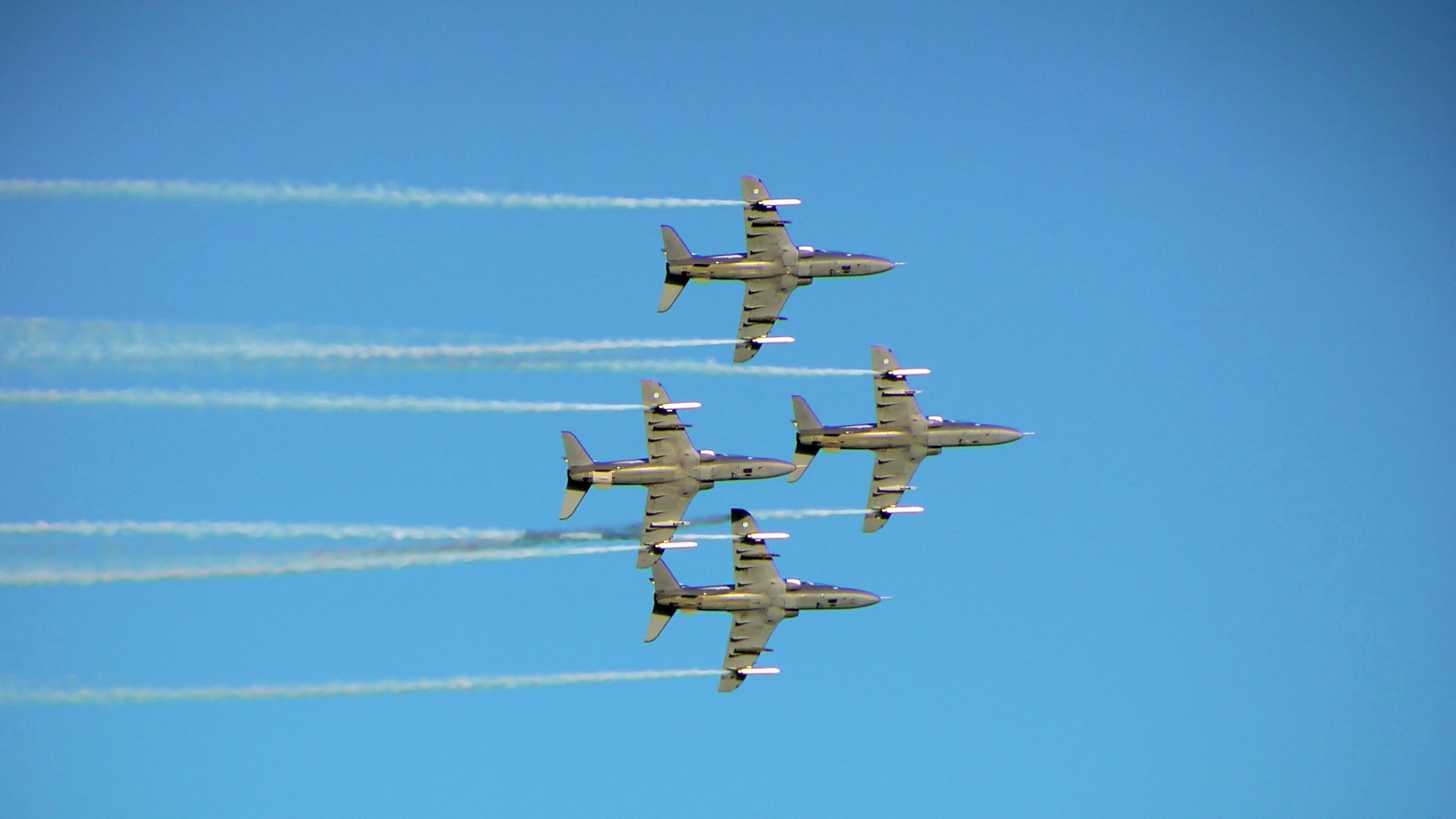
Midnight Hawks performing at the Helsinki Air Show 2017.

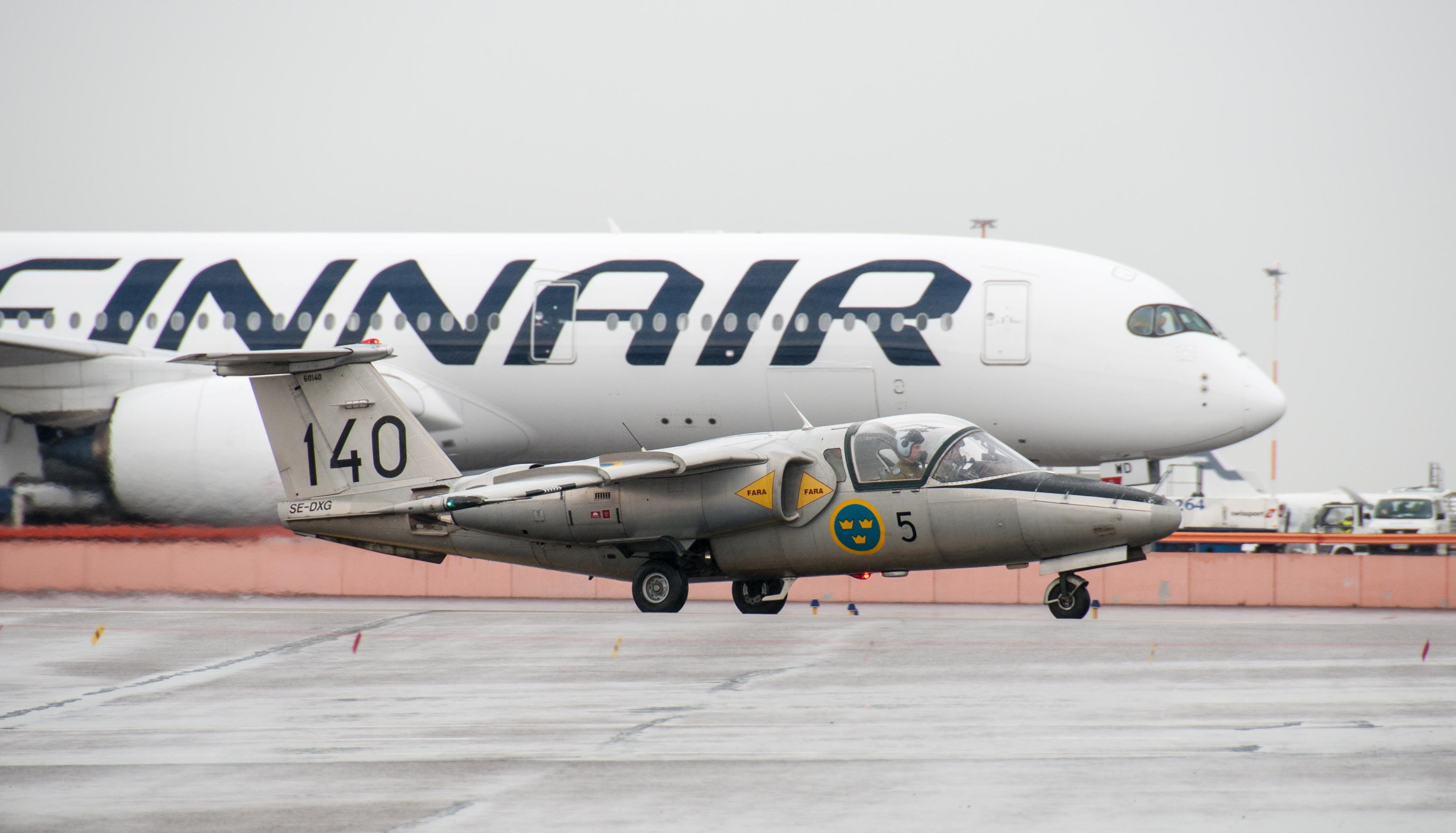
Saab Sk60A (SE-DXG) and Finnair Airbus A350, June 2017 prior to the Helsinki Air Show 2017.

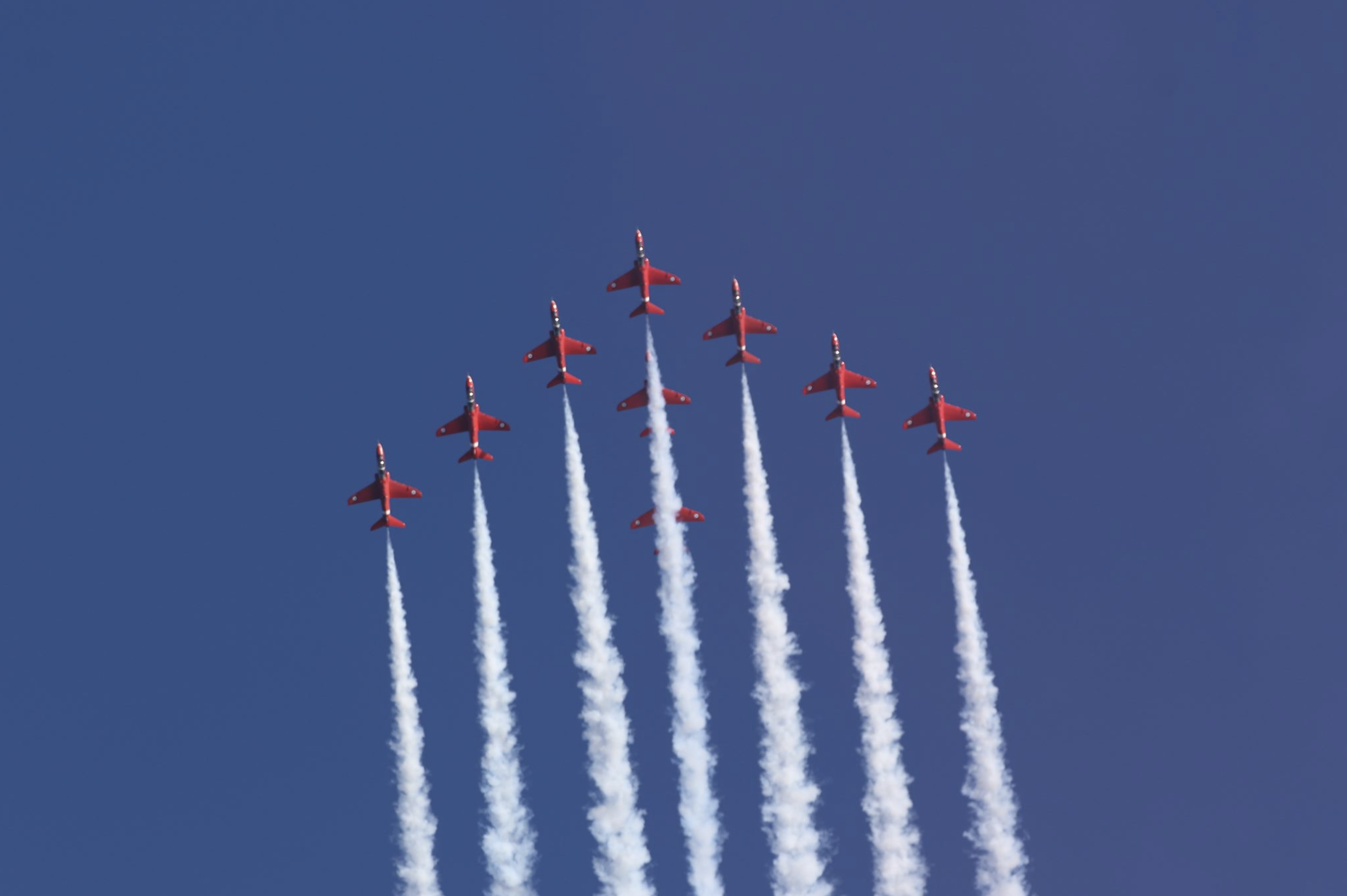
The Red Arrows at the Helsinki Air Show 2017.

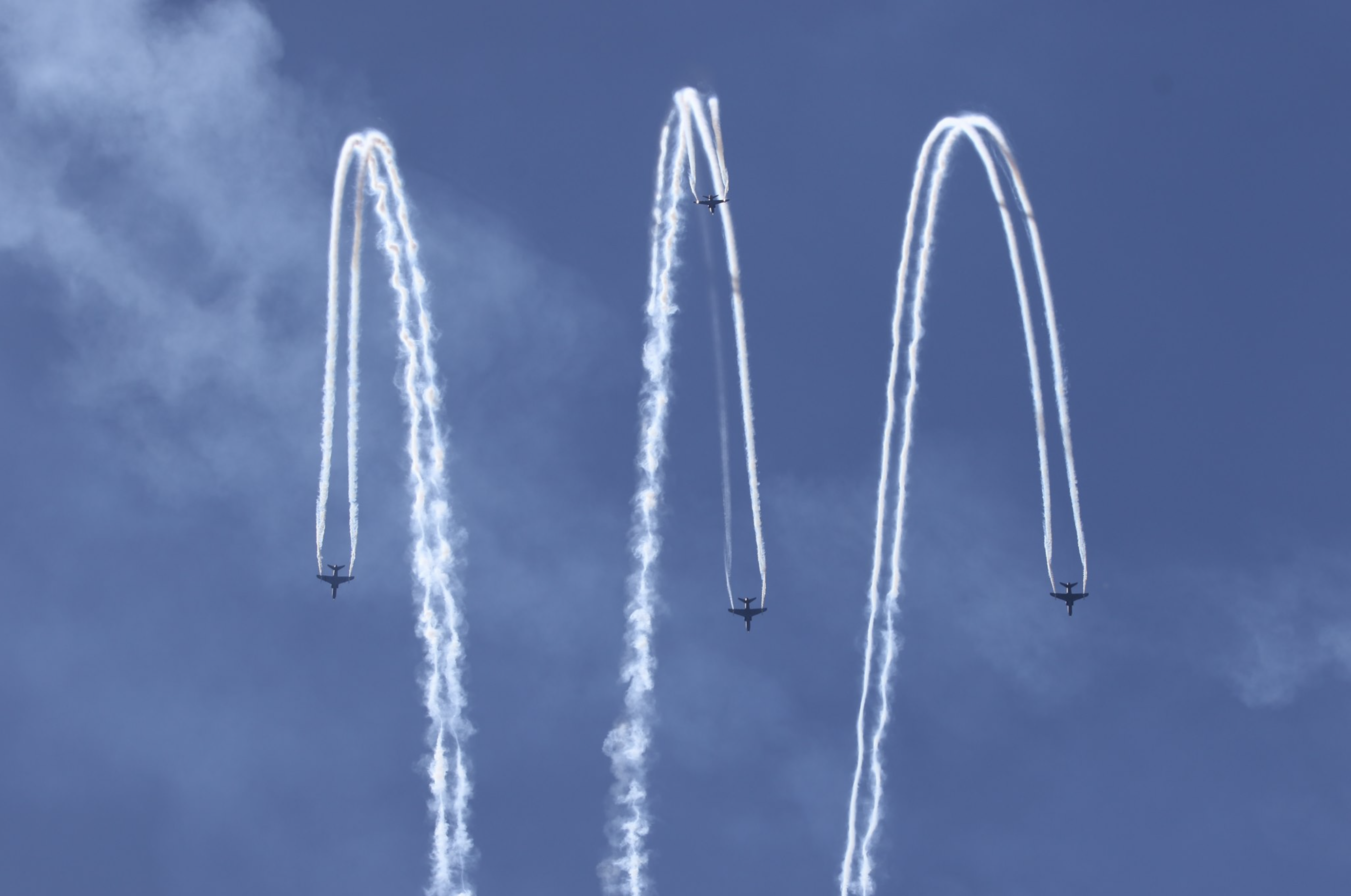
The Midnight Hawks at the Helsinki 2017 Air Show.

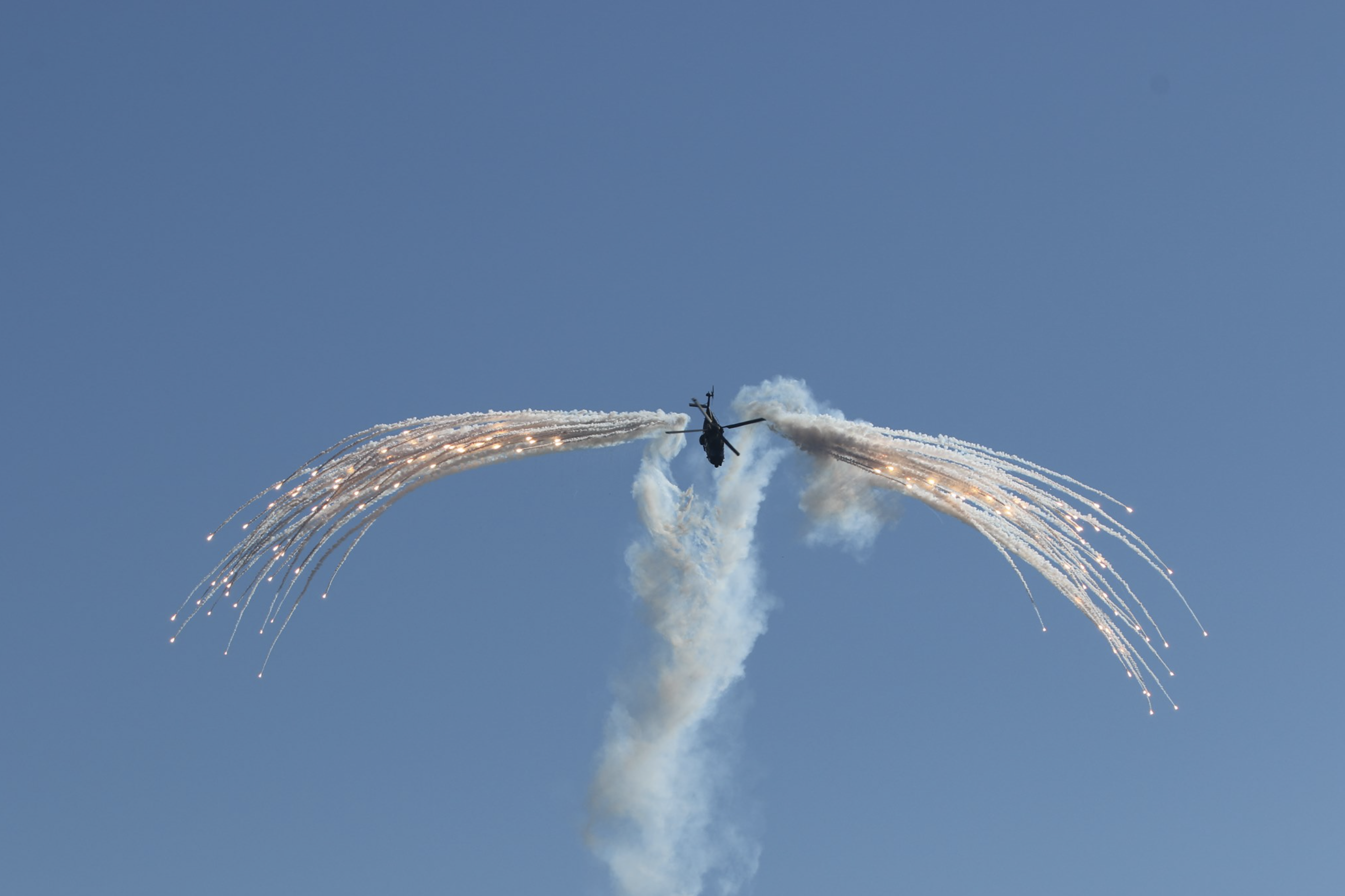
NHIndustries NH90 at the Helsinki 2017 Air Show.

The Kaivopuisto, or Helsinki Air Show 2017 was an air show organized by the Finnish Aviation Museum on June 9, 2017, in Kaivopuisto, Helsinki, Finland. The show contained 17 performances. It was organized as part of the 100th anniversary of the Finnish independence. The event attracted 130,000 on-site spectators, becoming the largest public event in Finland's history to date.

== Programme ==
The programme of the show was as follows:

Helsinki Air Show 2017
	Start	Aircraft/Group	Pilot	Organization
1.	16:00	Paragliding presentation		
2.	16:20	Arctic Eagles		
3.	16:50	H215 Super Puma and Dornier 228		Finnish Border Guard
4.	17:10	NHIndustries NH90		
5.	17:20	VL Viima		
6.	17:40	Arctic Eagles		
7.	18:00	Douglas DC-3 OH-LCH		Airveteran
8.	18:10	ATR 72		Nordic Regional Airlines
9.	18:20	Airbus A350		Finnair
10.	18:40	Boeing F/A-18E/F Super Hornet		
11.	18:55	A Hawk T1A, Red Arrows	Squadron Leader David Montenegro et al.	Royal Air Force
12.	19:25	Eurofighter Typhoon FGR.4	Flight Lieutenant Ryan Lawton	Royal Air Force
13.	19:40	Fouga Magister		
14.	20:00	Saab 35 Draken		
15.	20:10	Saab JAS 39 Gripen		
16.	20:30	F/A-18 Hornet	Tapio Yli-Nisula	Ilmavoimat
17.	20:40	BAE Systems Hawk, Midnight Hawks		Ilmavoimat

== Gallery ==
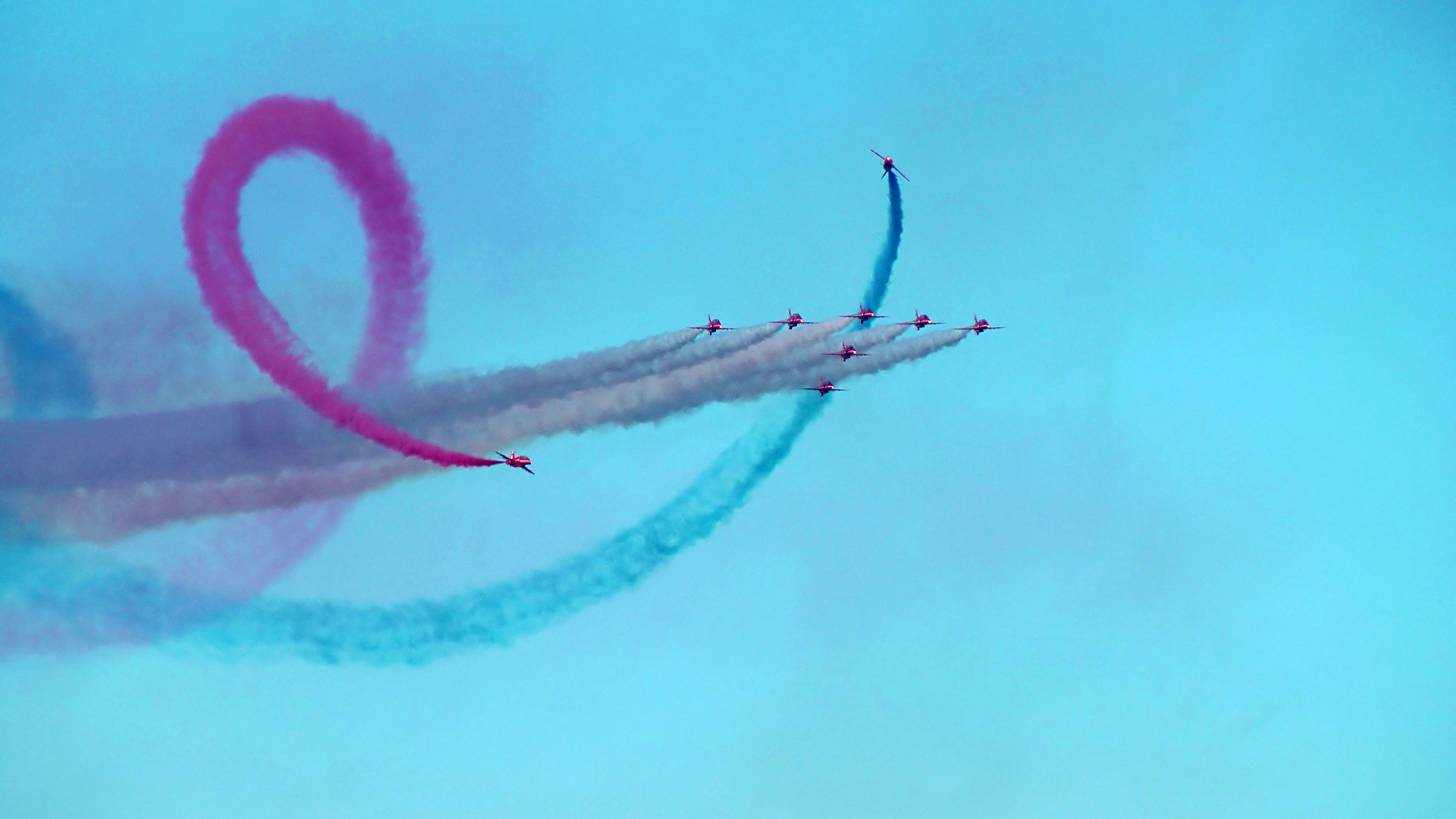
RAF Red Arrows at Kaivari 2017 Air Show

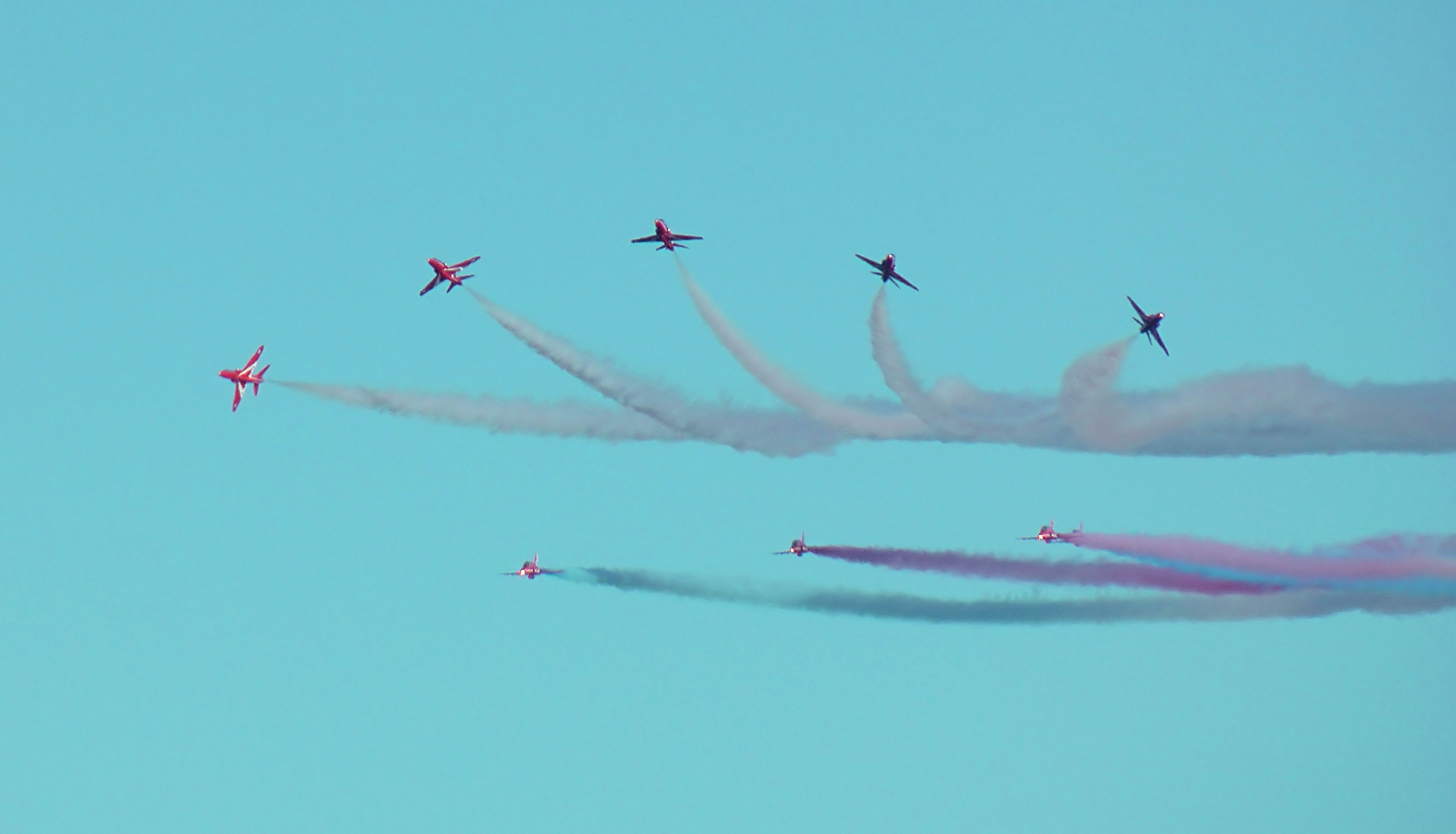
Red Arrows performing at the Helsinki 2017 Air Show.

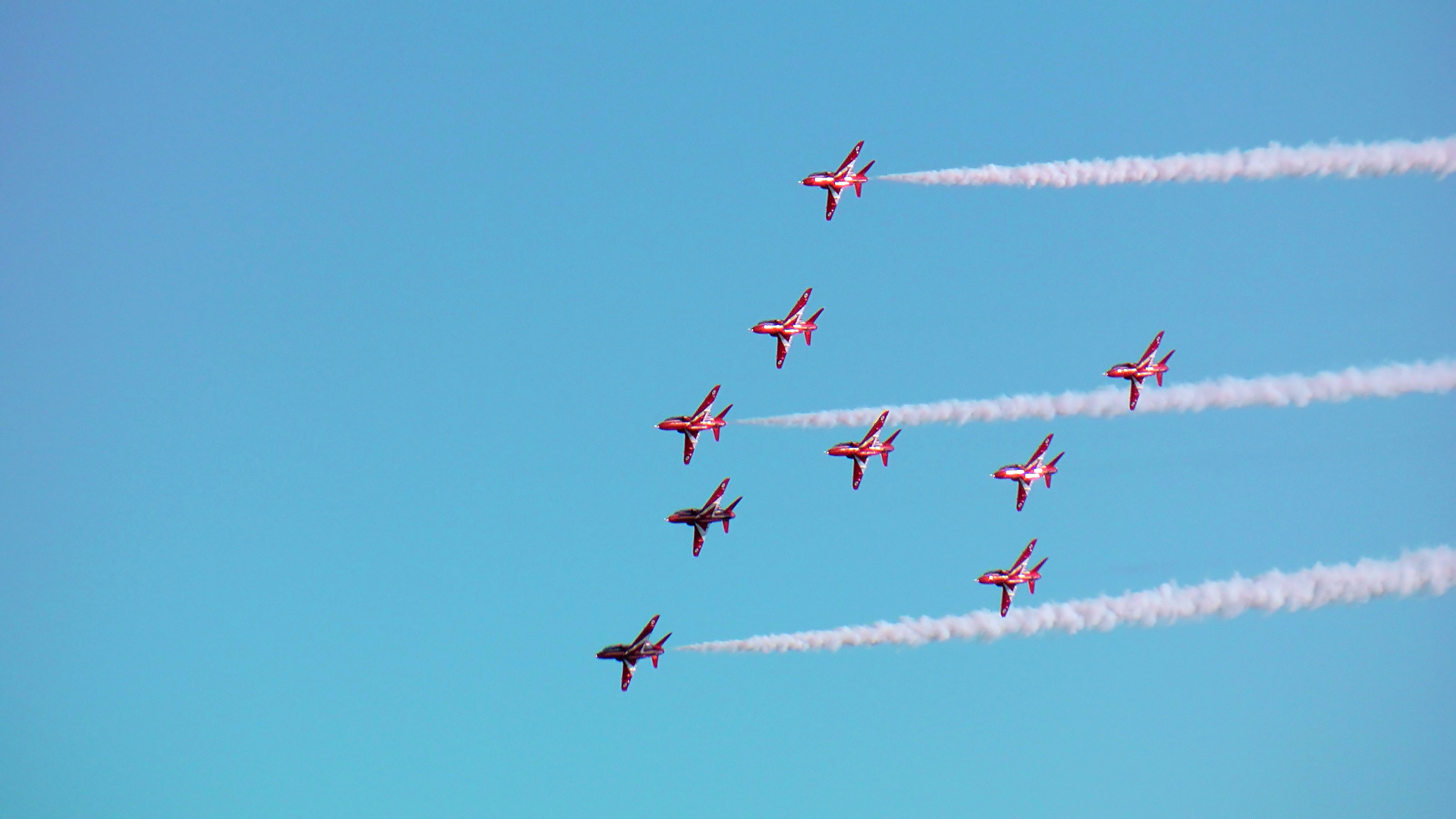
Red Arrows performing at the Helsinki 2017 Air Show.

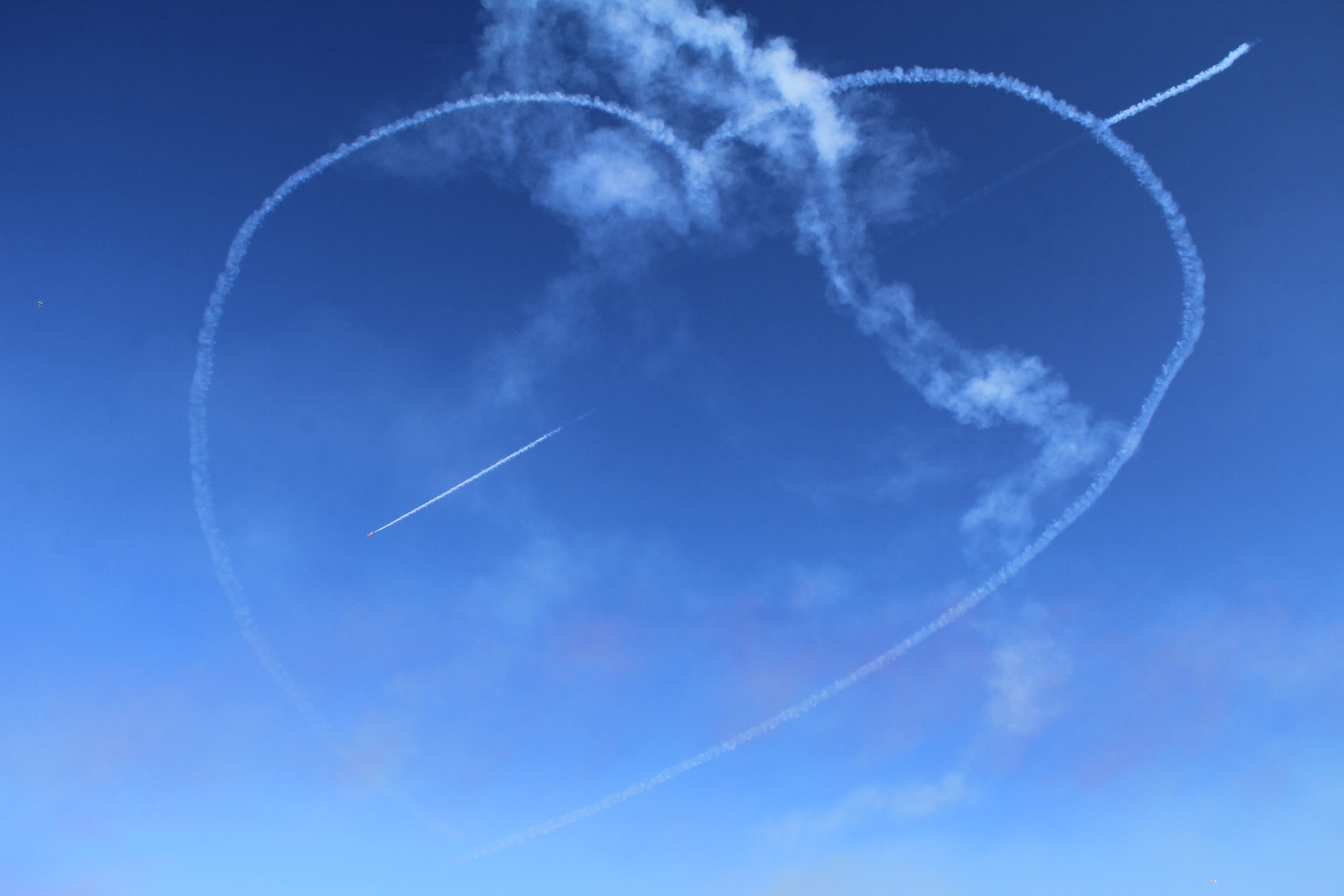
Red Arrows performing a heart at the Helsinki 2017 Air Show.

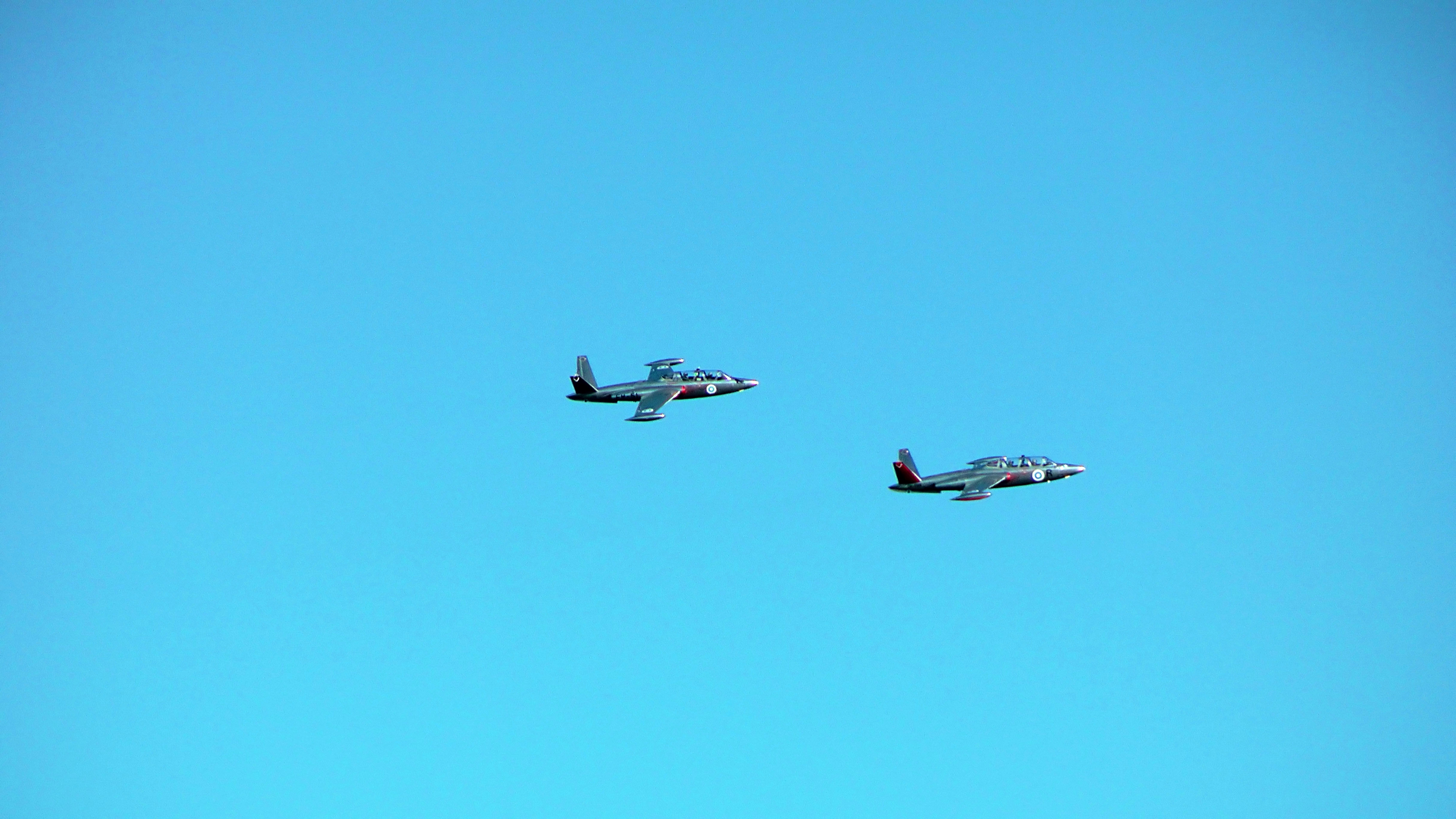
A pair of Fouga C.M.170 Magisters at the Helsinki 2017 Air Show.

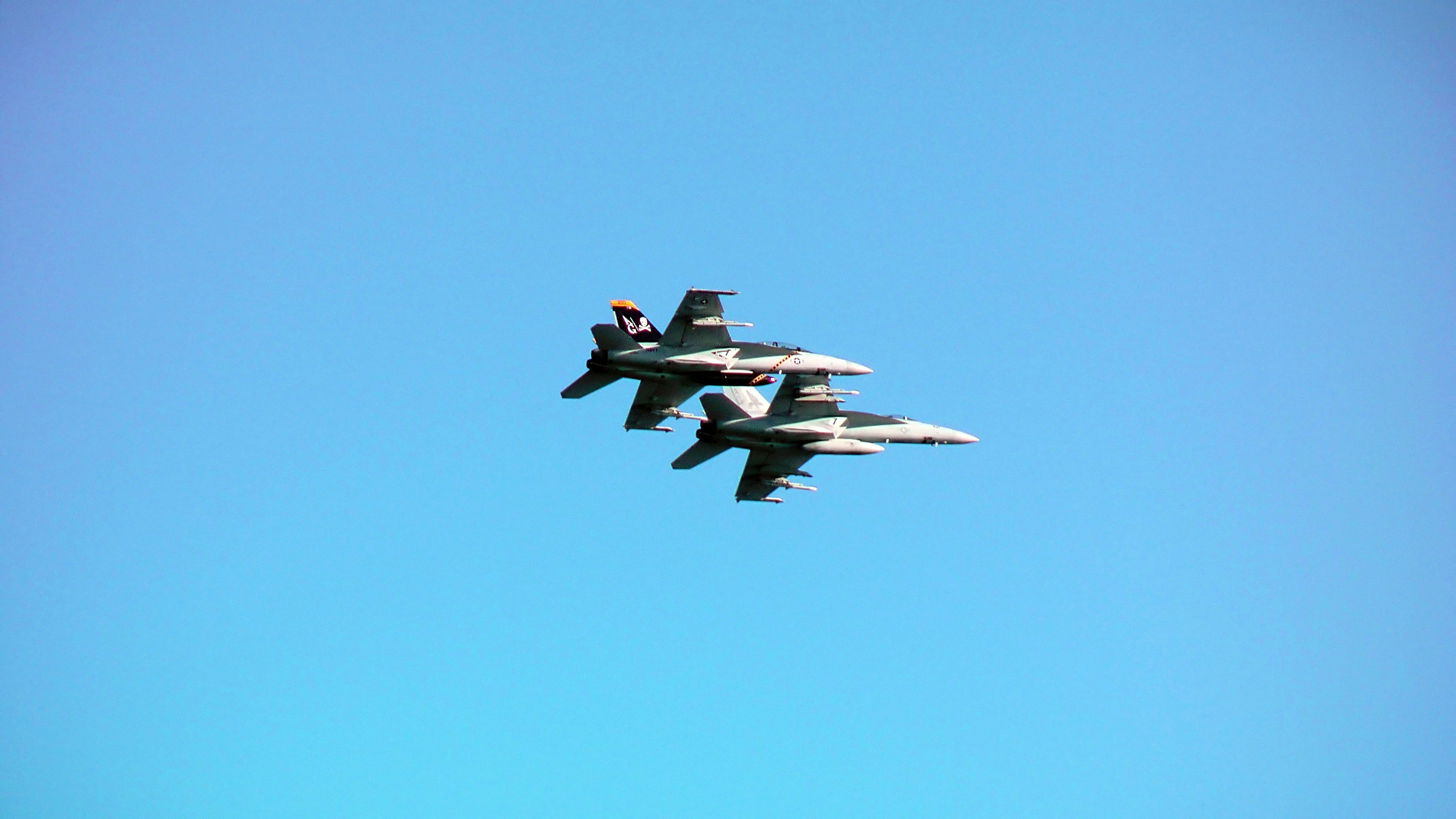
Two Super Hornets at the Helsinki 2017 Air Show.

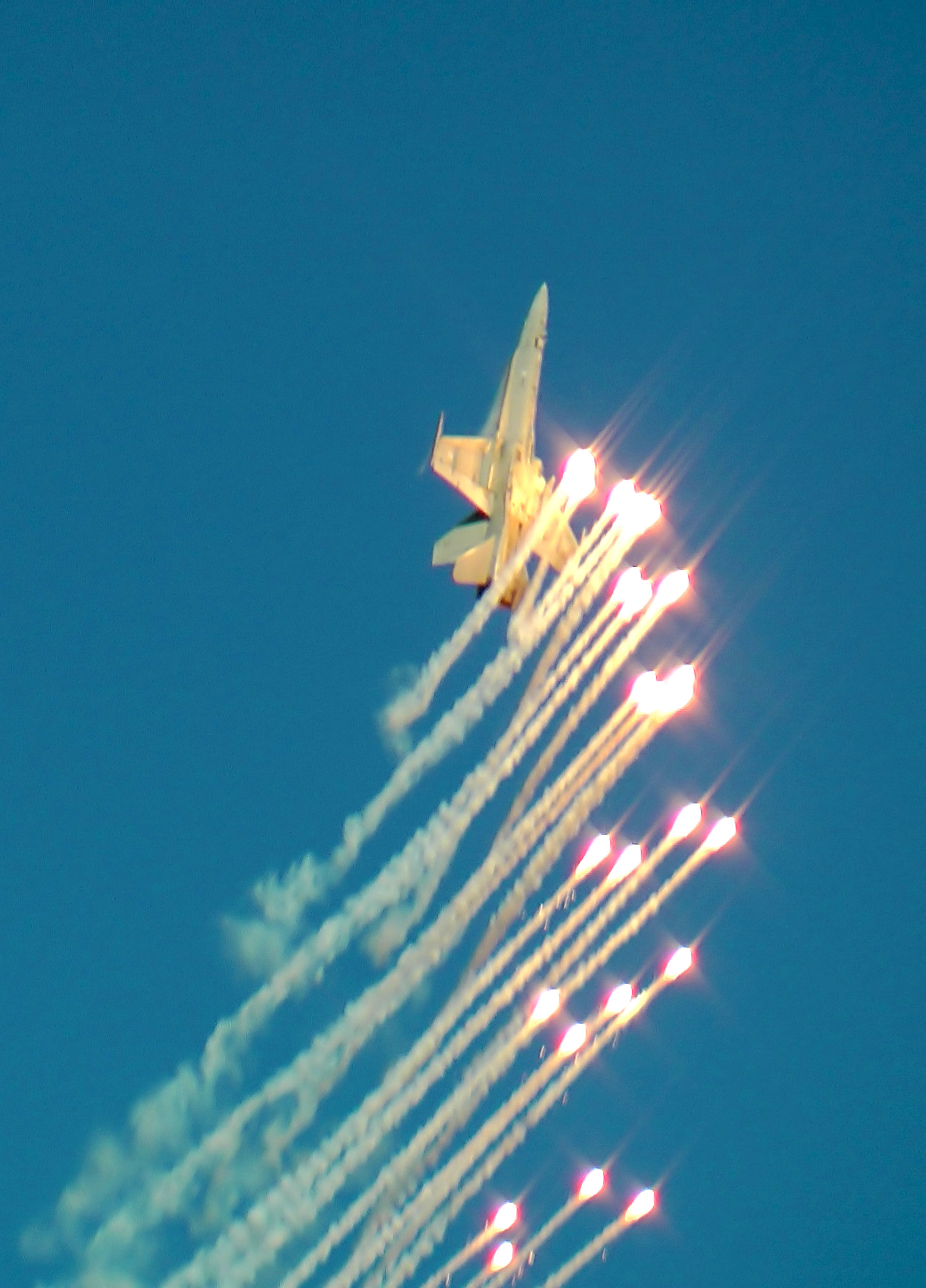
Finnish Air Force FA-18C Hornet performing at the Helsinki 2017 Air Show.
