= VL Sääski =

Military aeroplane

VL Sääski II
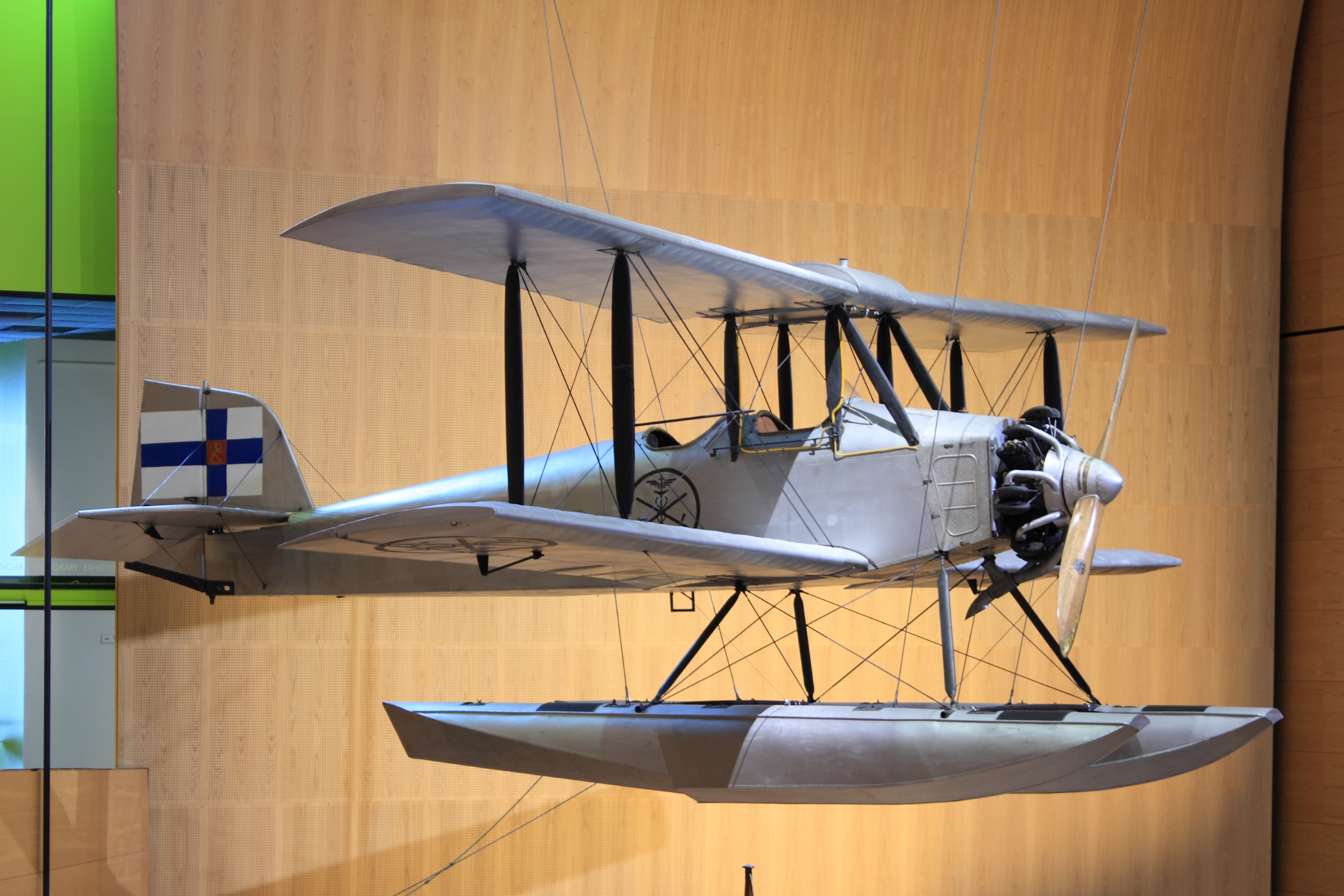
- Sääski II LK-1 in Maritime Centre Vellamo in Kotka, Finland

General information
- Type: Trainer aircraft
- Manufacturer: Valtion lentokonetehdas
- Designer: Kurt Berger and Asser Järvinen
- Primary user: Finnish Air Force
- Number built: 38

History
- Introduction date: 1928
- First flight: 1928

VL Sääski II (English: mosquito) was the first series-produced aircraft designed in Finland. The aircraft was built by the State Aircraft Factory (Valtion lentokonetehdas) (abbreviated either V.L. or VL) and was a two-seat, biplane, single-engine trainer constructed out of wood.

== Design and development ==
The aircraft was designed by Kurt Berger and Asser Järvinen in 1927 and the prototype was financed by the ten-person construction team that built the aircraft in the A.E. Nyman workshop. The prototype was called Sääski I and was completed in the early spring of 1928. The aircraft's civil registration code was "K-SASA" and it was sold to the Finnish Air Force on June 25, 1928. The constructors of the aircraft formed a company called Sääski in 1928, obtained the manufacturing license from the designers, and had four improved Sääski II's built by the State Aircraft Company for civilian use. When a lack of orders threatened to drive the company to bankruptcy, the FAF ordered 10 Sääski II aircraft. These were built in 1930.

Two further series were ordered by the air force and the total production of the aircraft numbered 32 aircraft between 1930 and 1932. The second series (beginning with SÄ-127) differed from the first in having a greater span. This version was called Sääski IIA. The aircraft was considered to be safe and reliable and was also equipped with floats. The seaplane version was still able to do aerobatics.

One civilian aircraft was sold to Gidsken Jakobsen, a pioneering Norwegian aviator, in 1929, 19,000 Norwegian krone. She named it Måsen ("gull"). One Sääski II (SÄ-120) was modified with a new airfoil and ailerons in August 1935 and was given the nomenclature of Sääski IV.

== Use in Finland ==
The Finnish Air Force operated 33 Sääski aircraft between 1928 and 1943: the 32 production aircraft bore the identification codes SÄ-113, SÄ-117 - SÄ-126 (version II), and SÄ-127 - SÄ-148 (version IIA), while the prototype, formerly known under the civil registration code K-SASA, was given the identification code SÄ-95 (version I). There were a further five Sääski's in the civilian register. The aircraft was primarily used as a trainer but also for aerial photography, aerial gunnery practice, and as a liaison aircraft for the army. All Sääskis were removed from FAF inventory in January 1943.

One Sääski IIA is preserved today and is on display at the Finnish Aviation Museum in Vantaa. Another one, the former coast guard aircraft LK 1, is on display at Maritime Centre Vellamo in Kotka, Finland. The Norwegian Aviation Musemum houses a replica of Jakobsen's aircraft in Bodø, Norway.

== Operators ==
Finland

- Finnish Air Force
- Finnish Border Guard

Norway

- Gidsken Jakobsen

== Specifications (VL Sääski) ==
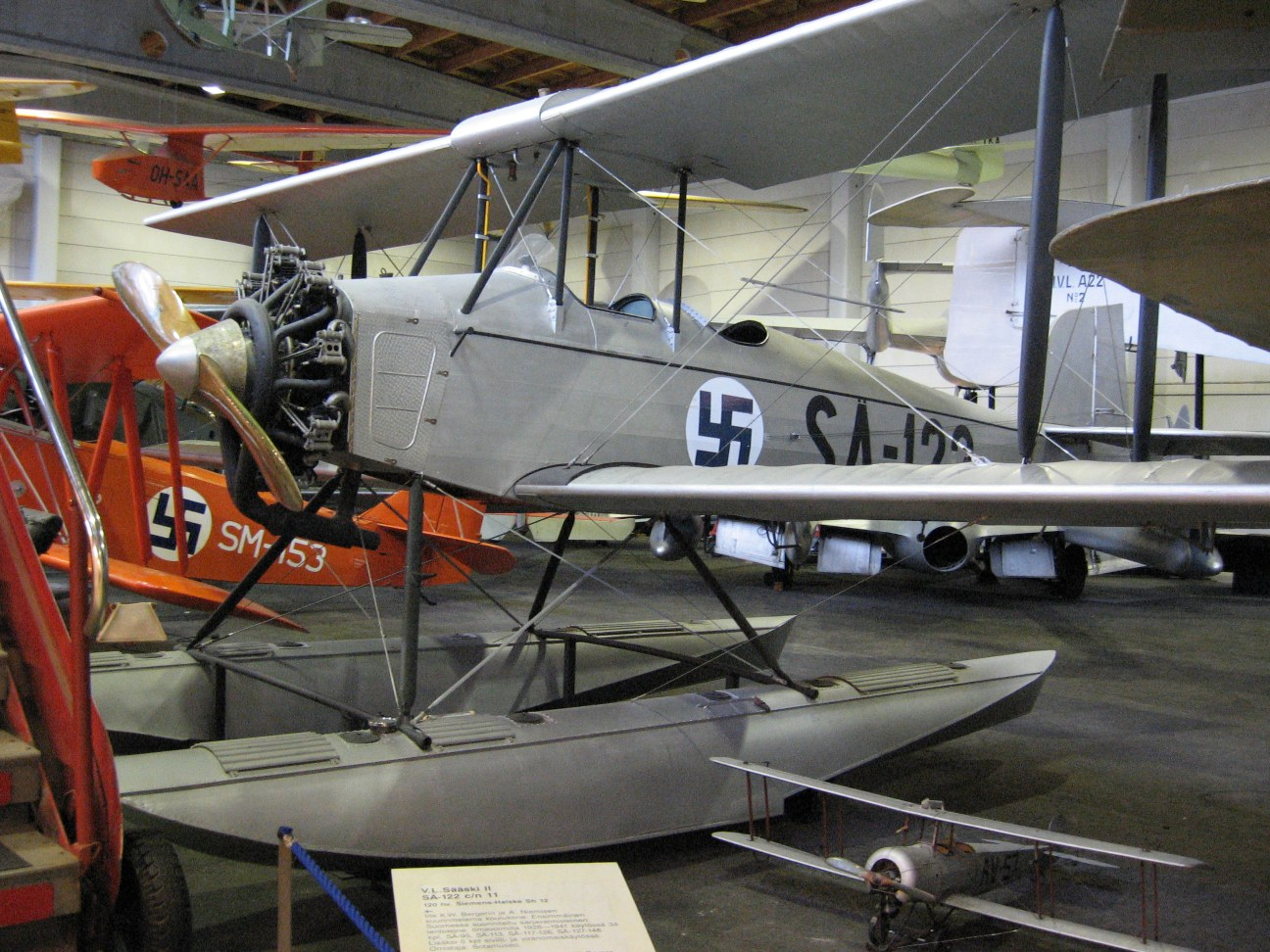
Preserved VL Sääski II at the Finnish Aviation Museum

General characteristics

- Crew: 2
- Length: 7.4 m (24 ft 3 in)
- Wingspan: 9.9 m (32 ft 6 in)
- Height: 2.4 m (7 ft 10 in)
- Wing area: 24 m^{2} (260 sq ft)
- Empty weight: 609 kg (1,343 lb)
- Max takeoff weight: 913 kg (2,013 lb)
- Powerplant: 1 × Siemens-Halske Sh 12 9-cylinder air-cooled radial piston engine, 90 kW (120 hp)
- Propellers: 2-bladed fixed-pitch propeller

Performance

- Maximum speed: 145 km/h (90 mph, 78 kn)
- Cruise speed: 110 km/h (68 mph, 59 kn)
- Endurance: 3 hours 30 minutes
- Service ceiling: 4,500 m (14,800 ft)
- Rate of climb: 2.3 m/s (450 ft/min)

== See also ==
Related lists

- List of interwar military aircraft
- List of aircraft of World War II
