= Heinonen HK-1 =

HK-1
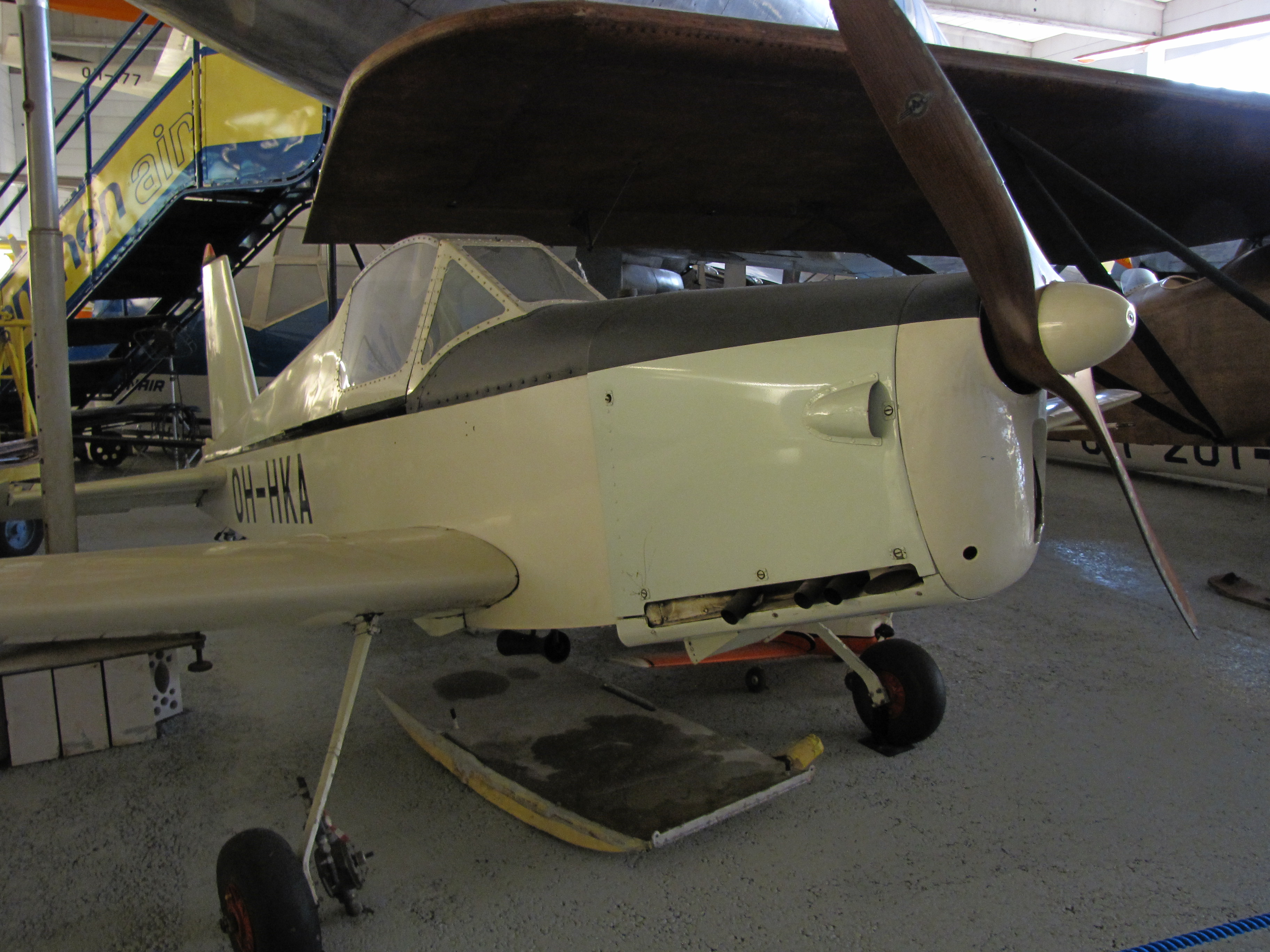

General information
- Type: Sport aircraft
- National origin: Finland
- Designer: Juhani Heinonen
- Status: Sole example in the Finnish Aviation Museum
- Number built: 3

History
- First flight: August 1954

The Heinonen HK-1 Keltiäinen is a Finnish single-seat, single-engined sport aircraft of the 1950s. Three examples were built. The first was used by its designer to set a class distance record in 1957 that stood for 27 years before being beaten.

== Design and development ==
Juhani Heinonen, an aeronautical engineer who had previously worked for the Valmet aircraft factory at Tampere, and then for Finnair, designed a single-seat, single engined aerobatic sport aircraft, the Heinonen HK-1. It was a low winged monoplane of all-wooden construction, powered by a Walter Mikron air-cooled inline engine rated at 48 kilowatts (65 hp) driving a two-bladed propeller. Split flaps were fitted to the wings, while the aircraft had a fixed tailwheel undercarriage, with a steerable tailwheel but no brakes. The pilot sat under a sliding perspex canopy. A prototype was built at the glider school at Jämi, first flying in August 1954.

== Operational history ==
The HK-1 was displayed at the 1955 and 1957 Ypenburg airshows. On 10 July 1957, Heinonen flew the HK-1, fitted with an additional ventral fuel tank, non-stop between Madrid, Spain and Turku in Finland, covering a distance of 2,844 kilometres (1,767 mi) in 17 hours 1 minute, setting a class world distance record for aircraft of less than 500 kilograms (1,100 lb) take-off weight. For this flight, Heinonen was awarded a Louis Blériot medal by the Fédération Aéronautique Internationale. This record was not broken until 3 July 1984.

The aircraft is now preserved at the Finnish Aviation Museum near Helsinki Airport.

== Specifications ==
Data from Jane's All The World's Aircraft 1956–57

General characteristics

- Crew: 1
- Length: 5.35 m (17 ft 7 in)
- Wingspan: 6.86 m (22 ft 6 in)
- Height: 2.08 m (6 ft 10 in)
- Wing area: 7.0 m^{2} (75 sq ft)
- Aspect ratio: 6.8:1
- Empty weight: 250 kg (551 lb)
- Gross weight: 400 kg (882 lb)
- Fuel capacity: 58 L (13 imp gal; 15 US gal)
- Powerplant: 1 × Walter Mikron III air-cooled inverted four-cylinder inline engine, 48 kW (65 hp)

Performance

- Maximum speed: 215 km/h (134 mph, 116 kn) at sea level
- Cruise speed: 185 km/h (115 mph, 100 kn)
- Range: 700 km (430 mi, 380 nmi)
- Rate of climb: 4.5 m/s (880 ft/min)
- Take-off distance to 15.25 m (50 ft): 240 m (790 ft)
- Landing distance from 15.25 m (50 ft): 350 metres (1,150 ft)

== See also ==
Aircraft of comparable role, configuration, and era

- PIK-11
