= OH-LCH =

Douglas DC-3 aircraft

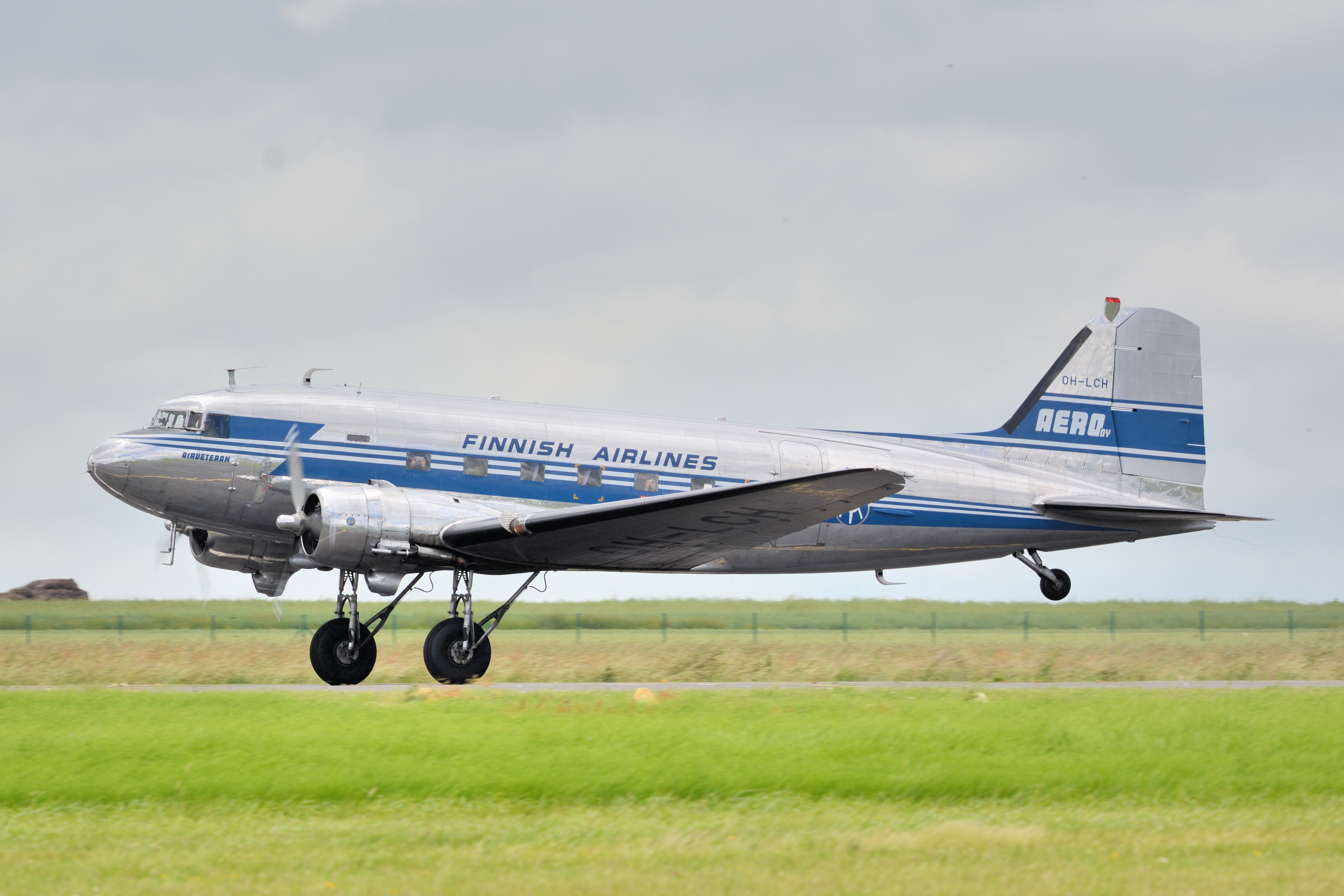
- OH-LCH in 2019

General information
- Type: Douglas C-53C Skytrooper
- Manufacturer: Douglas Aircraft Company
- Status: active for display flying and passenger trips
- Owners: Airveteran, previously with United States Army Air Force (USAAF), Aero and Finnish Air Force
- Construction number: 6346
- Serial: 43-2033, DO–11

History
- First flight: December 1942
- In service: 1942–1986, military and revenue service
- Preserved at: airworthy at Helsinki Airport winters at Vaasa Airport

OH-LCH ("Hotel") is the only airworthy Douglas DC-3 airplane in Finland.

== The history of OH-LCH ==
The aircraft was built in the Douglas Aircraft Company factory in Santa Monica, California and was completed on Christmas Eve 1942. It had been ordered by Pan American Airways, and it had been intended for their routes in Latin America. However, because of the war, the aircraft was handed over to the United States Armed Forces on 27 December 1942, and from the spring of 1943 to the fall of that year it served in the Northern Atlantic branch of the Transport Wing, probably at Presque Isle, Maine. Late in the fall of 1944, the aircraft was transferred to the Eighth Air Force in Europe, and after the war it was moved to the Oberpfaffenhofen center in Germany.

In 1948 the State of Finland purchased the aircraft for use by Aero. Its first scheduled passenger flight took place on 21 July 1948, on the Malmi–Vaasa–Tampere–Malmi route. During the following winter the aircraft was furnished for passenger use. It flew until December 1960, when it had flown 22 137 hours. It was then used for spare parts, but was reassembled and fitted with a freight door since Aero needed freight aircraft. It retained its previous registration, and was put back to service after Midsummer 1963. Aero operated the aircraft until 1 April 1967, when it flew Aero’s last DC-3 scheduled passenger flight.

In 1970 the aircraft, along with the other DC-3s owned by Finnair, was sold to the Finnish Air Force, and was given the registration DO-11. In 1985, the Air Force retired its DC-3s. and OH-LCH, along with OH-LCD, were sold to Airveteran Oy. The latter aircraft is now at the Finnish Aviation Museum.

== OH-LCH today ==
The aircraft was previously based at Malmi Airport, but since its closure in 2021, OH-LCH has been based at Helsinki Airport. One has to be a member of the Finnish DC Association to be able to fly on the aircraft. The winter months are spent in a hangar at Vaasa Airport.

In 2026 the plane was featured in the music video for the KAJ single 'Economy PLUS'

== Specifications (DC-3A-S1C3G) ==
Data from McDonnell Douglas Aircraft since 1920

General characteristics

- Crew: two
- Capacity: 21–32 passengers
- Length: 64 ft 8 in (19.7 m)
- Wingspan: 95 ft 2 in (29.0 m)
- Height: 16 ft 11 in (5.16 m)
- Wing area: 987 sq ft (91.7 m^{2})
- Aspect ratio: 9.17
- Airfoil: NACA2215 / NACA2206
- Empty weight: 16,865 lb (7,650 kg)
- Gross weight: 25,200 lb (11,431 kg)
- Fuel capacity: 822 gal. (3736 L)
- Powerplant: 2 × Pratt & Whitney R-1830-S1C3G Twin Wasp 14-cyl. air-cooled two row radial piston engine, 1,200 hp (890 kW) each
- Propellers: 3-bladed Hamilton Standard 23E50 series, 11 ft 6 in (3.5 m) diameter hydraulically controlled constant speed, feathering

Performance

- Maximum speed: 200 kn (230 mph, 370 km/h) at 8,500 ft (2,590 m)
- Cruise speed: 180 kn (207 mph, 333 km/h)
- Stall speed: 68.0 kn (78.2 mph, 125.9 km/h)
- Range: 1,370 nmi (1,580 mi, 2,540 km) (maximum fuel, 3,500 lb payload)
- Service ceiling: 23,200 ft (7,100 m)
- Rate of climb: 1,130 ft/min (5.7 m/s)
- Wing loading: 25.5 lb/sq ft (125 kg/m^{2})
- Power/mass: 0.0952 hp/lb (156.5 W/kg)

== Sources ==
- Francillon, René. McDonnell Douglas Aircraft Since 1920: Volume I. London: Putnam, 1979. ISBN 0-87021-428-4.
- Liukkonen, Meri (16 July 2020). "DC-3:n kyydissä avautuvat kaupunkien hulppeat näkymät. Malmin DC-3-konetta ylläpidetään vapaaehtoisten voimin. Koneen kyydissä on myös vietetty monenlaisia perhejuhlia" [‘Flying a DC-3 one gets wonderful views of the cities. The plane at the Malmi Airport is maintained by volunteers. Many family events have also been celebrated aboard the plane’]. Helsingin Sanomat HS Viikko (in Finnish). Helsinki: Sanoma. pp. 8–9.
- "DC-3 OH-LCH historia" [‘DC-3 OH-LCH history’] (in Finnish). DC-Association (Finland.
