= PIK-11 =

Finnish single-engine sport aircraft

PIK-11 Tumppu
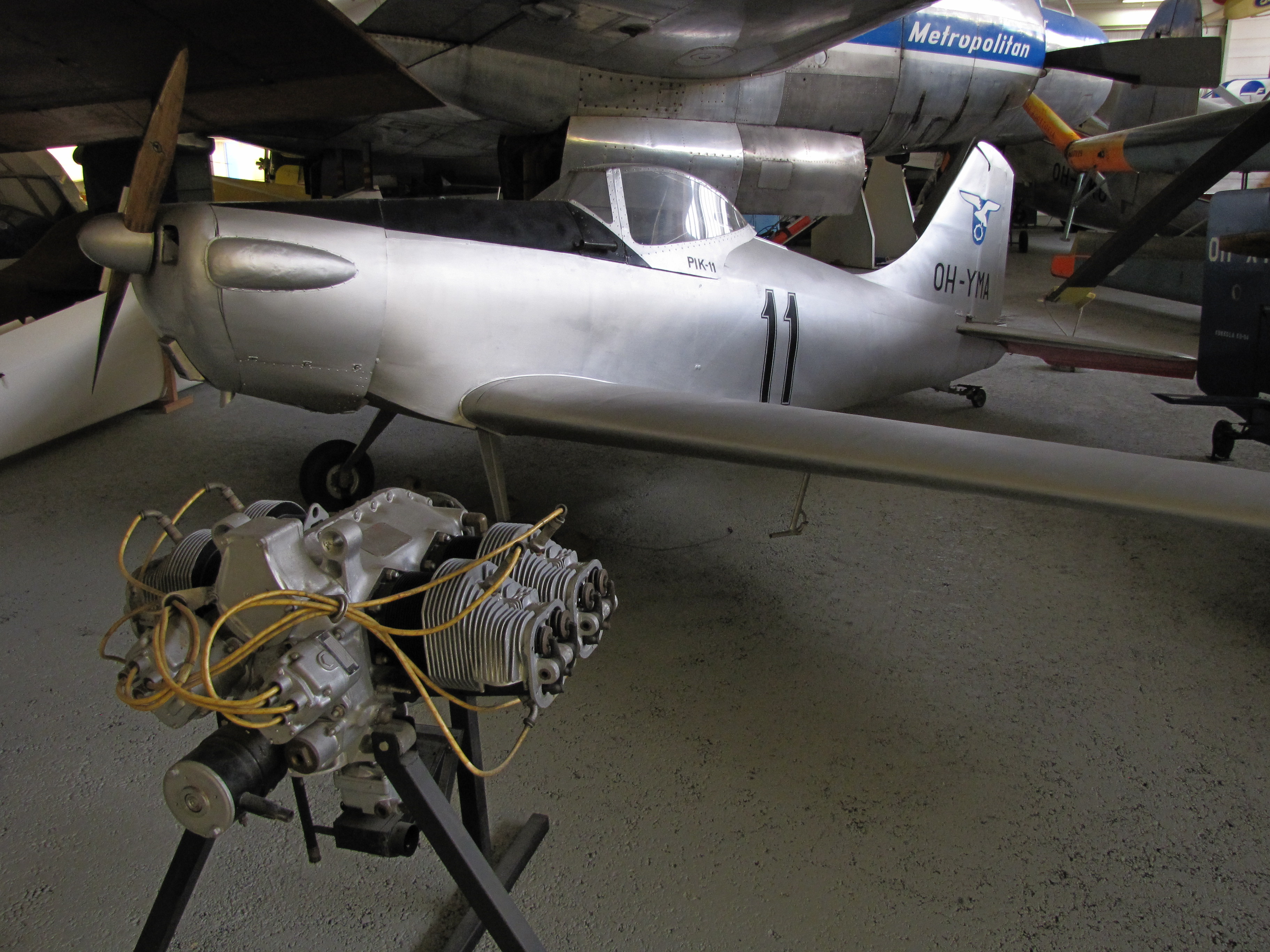
- PIK-11 Tumppu in Finnish Aviation Museum

General information
- Type: Sport aircraft
- National origin: Finland
- Manufacturer: Polyteknikkojen Ilmailukerho
- Number built: 4

History
- First flight: 15 March 1953

The PIK-11 Tumppu ("Mitten") was a single-seat, single-engine sport aircraft developed in Finland in the 1950s. It was a low-wing, cantilever monoplane of conventional design with an enclosed cockpit and fixed, tailwheel undercarriage. It was to be the first powered aircraft produced by Polyteknikkojen Ilmailukerho, (Note: A Grunau Baby sailplane had been converted into a motorglider in 1949 as the PIK-10 Moottoribaby.) with the objective being building an aircraft for club use that was cheap to build and easy to fly.

Design work was started in 1948 by Kai Mellen and Ilkka Lounanmaa under the direction of Professor Arvo Ylinen. The first of four machines made its first flight on 15 March 1953. The prototype is preserved at the Finnish Aviation Museum, and another example was still listed on the Finnish Civil Aviation Authority registry in 2008.

In the early 21st century, a flying replica was under construction, to be powered by a Rotax 912 engine.

== Specifications ==
Data from Jane's all the World's Aircraft 1955-56 &

General characteristics

- Crew: 1
- Length: 5.5 m (18 ft 1 in)
- Wingspan: 8 m (26 ft 3 in)
- Height: 1.65 m (5 ft 5 in) tail down
- Empty weight: 238 kg (525 lb)
- Gross weight: 373 kg (822 lb)
- Powerplant: 1 × Continental A65-8 4-cyl. horizontally-opposed air-cooled piston engine, 48 kW (65 hp)

Performance

- Maximum speed: 220 km/h (140 mph, 120 kn) at sea level
- Cruise speed: 170 km/h (110 mph, 92 kn) at sea level
- Landing speed: 80 km/h (50 mph; 43 kn)
- Never exceed speed: 280 km/h (170 mph, 150 kn)
- Range: 700 km (430 mi, 380 nmi)
- g limits: +5.5 -1.5
- Rate of climb: 5.5 m/s (1,080 ft/min) initial
- Time to altitude: 1,000 m (3,300 ft) in 3 minutes 10 seconds, 5,000 m (16,000 ft) in 31 minutes
- Wing loading: 41 kg/m^{2} (8.4 lb/sq ft)
- Power/mass: 0.13 kW/kg (0.0787 hp/lb)
  Take-off run: 300 m (980 ft) to clear 15 m (50 ft)
