= Finnish Aviation Museum =

- Suomen Ilmailumuseo; Finlands flygmuseum
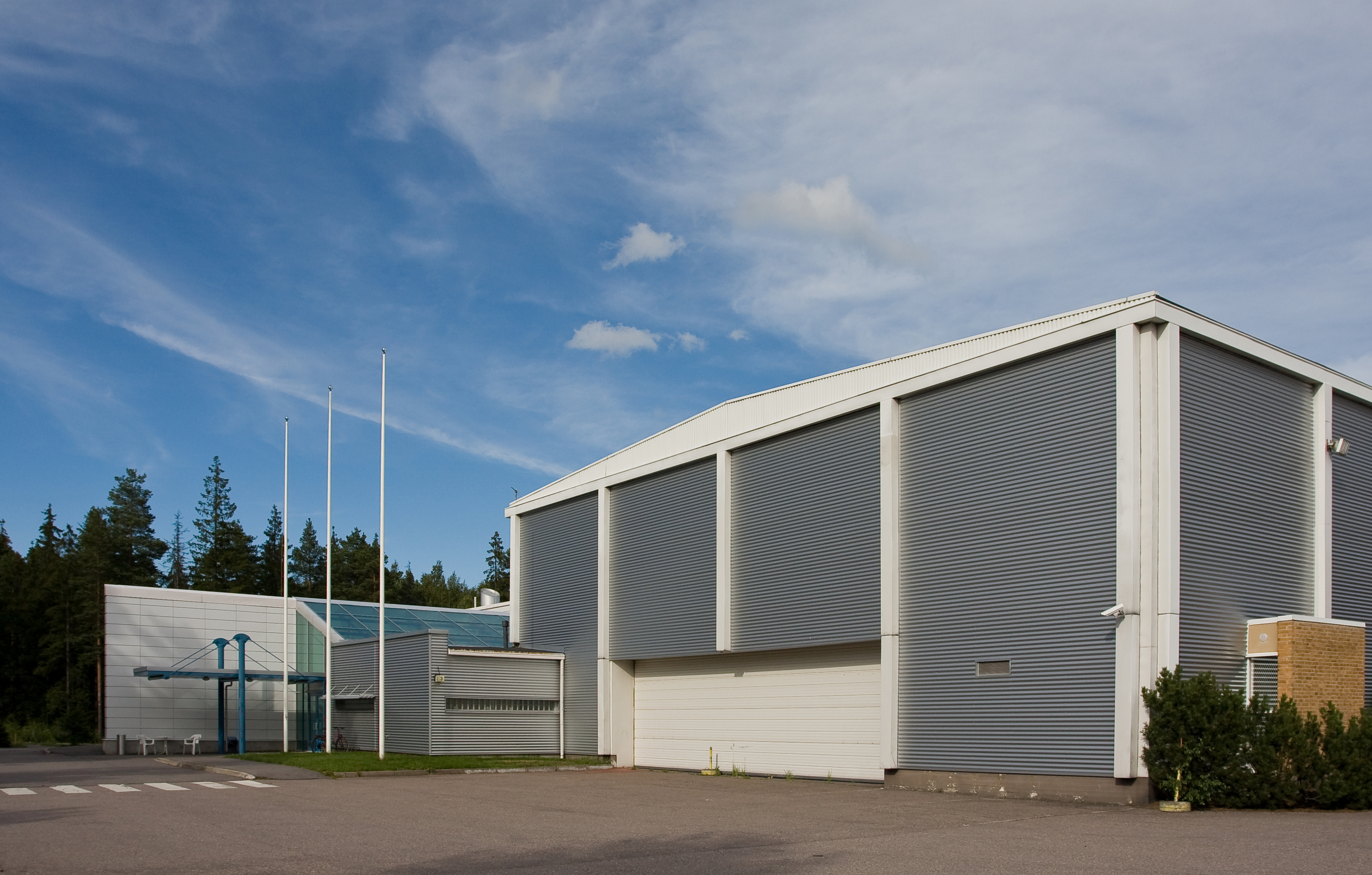
- Main building of the Finnish Aviation Museum

- Location within Finland
- Established: 4 December 1969
- Location: Aviapolis; Veromies, Vantaa, Finland
- Coordinates: 60°18.253′N 024°57.652′E
- Type: Aviation museum
- Collection size: 9,600 objects 16,000 books 78,000 photographs
- Owner: Finnish Aviation Museum Foundation
- Public transit access: Airport trains I & P Local and regional bus routes
- Website: ilmailumuseo.fi/en/

The Finnish Aviation Museum (Finnish: Suomen ilmailumuseo, Swedish: Finlands flygmuseum) is a museum specialising in aircraft, located near Helsinki Airport in Veromies, Vantaa, Finland.

== History ==
The Aviation Museum Society (Finnish: Ilmailumuseoyhdistys ry) was founded on 4 December 1969. Opened in 1972, the museum was initially located in the basement of the Helsinki Airport terminal, but received its own facilities in 1981 near the airport. The museum has constantly expanded and today has an office wing, research rooms, aviation library, archive, and an auditorium for 200 people.

Currently the museum is owned by the Finnish Aviation Museum Foundation (Finnish: Suomen Ilmailumuseosäätiö), founded in 1996.

== Exhibition ==
The museum displays some 9,600 items, and the library has over 16,000 books and 160,000 aviation-related magazines. Furthermore, the museum has a large collection of flight instruction and service books. There are also some 78,000 photographs, negatives, and slides. The archive spans some 1,800 shelf metres.

The whole collection comprises some 80 aircraft, of which 22 are gliders. The following is a list of some of the more noteworthy aircraft:

- Adaridi
- (Atol 450, located at the Heureka museum?)
- Beechcraft 95-A55 Baron
- Bell 47D-1
- Blomqvist-Nyberg, the second oldest Finnish aircraft
- Caudron C.60
- Convair 440 Metropolitan
- De Havilland Vampire F.B.52 and DH Vampire Trainer T.55
- De Havilland Canada DHC-2 Beaver
- DFS 108 Olympia
- Douglas DC-2 hull
- Douglas DC-3
- Eklund TE-1 flying boat
- Fibera KK-1e Utu, 2 aircraft
- Fieseler FI 156K-1 Storch
- Focke-Wulf Fw 44 J Stieglitz
- Folland Gnat Mk.1
- Fouga Magister CM170 A
- Gloster Gamecock (fuselage wreck)
- Grunau 9
- Grunau Baby IIb, 2 aircraft
- Harakka I and II
- Heinonen HK-1 Keltiäinen
- Airship Colt GA-42, gondola
- I.V.L. A.22 Hansa
- Karhumäki Karhu 48B
- Karhumäki Viri replica
- Klemm L25
- Kokkola KO-04 Super Upstart-autogiro
- L-13n-10 Blanik
- Letov S.218 A Smolik
- Lockheed 18-07 Lodestar
- MiG-21bis, 2 aircraft
- MiG-21, 2 aircraft
- Mil Mi-4
- Mil Mi-8
- Mahe Scout-ultralight
- Taivaankirppu replica
- PIK-3a Kanttikolmonen
- PIK-3c Kajava
- PIK-5b
- PIK-10 Moottoribaby
- PIK-11 Tumppu
- PIK-12 Gabriel
- PIK-16c Vasama
- PIK-20
- Piper PA-28R-180 Cherokee Arrow
- Polikarpov UTI-4 ( I-16 UTI)
- PZL SM-1SZ helicopter
- Quickie
- Saab 35 Draken, 2 aircraft
- Saab 91D Safir
- Schulgleiter SG-38
- SZD-9bis 1c Bocian
- SZD-10bis Czapla A
- Sud Aviation SE 210 Caravelle simulator
- Valmet Tuuli III (not on display)
- Valmet Vihuri forward part of fuselage
- VL Pyry II
- VL Sääski II
- VL Tuisku
- VL Viima II
- W.W.S.1 Salamandra
- Wassmer WA-54 Atlantic

A complete list can be found at the museum's web page.

== See also ==
- Helsinki Air Show 2017
- List of aerospace museums
- List of museums in Finland
