= List of military aircraft of Finland =

The following is a list of military aircraft of Finland, both historical and currently in use by the Finnish Defence Forces.

== Current inventory ==
Model	Origin	Type	Operational	Quantity	In service	Retired	Image	Details
Lockheed Martin F-35 Lightning II	United States	Multi-role fighter	12	64	2026			Block 4-version
Boeing F/A-18C Hornet	United States	Multi-role fighter	54	57	1995			
Boeing F/A-18D Hornet	United States	Two-seat trainer	7	8	1995			
BAE Hawk Mk.66	United Kingdom	Two-seat trainer	16	18	2009			
BAE Hawk Mk.51A	United Kingdom	Two-seat trainer	7	7	1993			
BAE Hawk Mk.51	United Kingdom	Two-seat trainer	7	50	1980			
Learjet 35A/S	United States	Maritime surveillance, aerial photography, air sampling, target towing, personnel transport	3	3	1982			
Pilatus PC-12 NG	Switzerland	Passenger and cargo aircraft	6	6	2010			
C-295M	Spain	Transport aircraft	2	2	2007			
C-295 SIGINT	Spain	Signals intelligence aircraft	1	1	2018			
Grob G 115E	Germany	Primary trainer	28	28	2016			

== Heavy Airlift Wing ==
Model	Origin	Type	Operational	Quantity	In service	Retired	Image	Details
Boeing C-17 Globemaster III	United States	Heavy transport	3	3	2009			Finland is a partner in NATO's Strategic Airlift Capability and has access to 100 flight hours from the C-17s every year (3.2%). The aircraft operate from Pápa Air Base in Hungary.

== Army Aviation ==
=== Helicopters ===
All helicopters were transferred to the army aviation in 1997.

Model	Origin	Type	Operational	Quantity	In service	Retired	Image	Details
NHI NH90	European Union	Medium helicopter	20	20	2008			
MD 500D	United States	Light helicopter	2	3				
MD 500E	United States	Light helicopter	5	6	1982, 1998			
Mil Mi-8PS	Soviet Union	Medium helicopter	0	2	1978	2007		
MD 500M	United States	Light helicopter	0	1	1975	1982		
MD 500C	United States	Light helicopter	0	2	1975	1986		
Mil Mi-8T	Soviet Union	Medium helicopter	0	8	1973	2010		
Bell 206A	United States	Utility helicopter	0	1	1968	1979		
Sud-Aviation S.E.3130 Alouette II	France	Light helicopter	0	2	1965	1975		
Mil Mi-4	Soviet Union	Medium helicopter	0	3	1962	1979		
Mil Mi-1	Poland	Light helicopter	0	4	1961	1967		
Bell 47 D-1	United States	Light helicopter	0	1	1953	1957		Bought jointly with Imatran Voima, who was the sole operator after 1957.

=== UAVs ===
Model	Origin	Type	Operational	Quantity	In service	Retired	Image	Details
RUAG Ranger	Switzerland	Tactical UAV	10	12	2001			
Aeronautics Orbiter-2B	Israel	Lightweight UAV	250	250	2012			55 systems, with a total of 250 mini air vehicles delivered
DJI Mavic Pro Platinum	China	Lightweight quadcopter drone	150	150	2019			

== Post-WWII aircraft, propeller-driven ==
Model	Origin	Type	Operational	Quantity	In service	Retired	Image	Details
Britten-Norman BN-2A Islander	United Kingdom	Liaison aircraft	0	1	1974	1975		
Cessna 402B Businessliner	United States	Liaison aircraft	0	2	1976	1984		
Piper PA-28R-200 Cherokee Arrow II Piper PA-28RT-201 Arrow IV	United States	Liaison aircraft	0 0	6 4	1974 1980	2004 2004		
Piper PA-31 Navajo PA-31-350 Chieftain	United States	Liaison aircraft	0 0	1 6	1974 1983	1975 2010		
Douglas C-47	United States	Transport aircraft	0	9	1960	1984		
Fokker F-27	Netherlands	Transport aircraft	0	2	1980, 1984	2013		One F-27 Mk 100 Friendship and one Mk 400M Troopship
Fokker F-27	Netherlands	Signals intelligence aircraft	0	1	1980	2015		Mk 100 Friendship
Valmet L-90 TP Redigo	Finland	Training and liaison aircraft	0	10	1992	2013		
Valmet L-70 Vinka	Finland	Basic trainer	0	30	1980	2022		
de Havilland Canada DHC-2 Beaver	Canada	Liaison aircraft	0	3	1958	1971		
Hunting Percival Pembroke	United Kingdom	Aerial photography	0	2	1956	1968		
Valmet Vihuri	Finland	Training aircraft	0	51	1951	1959		
Saab 17A	Sweden	Target tow	0	2	1959	1961		
Saab 91D Safir	Sweden	Target tow	0	36	1958	1982		
Valmet Tuuli III	Finland	Training aircraft	0	1	1957	1959		
Beechcraft D17S	United States	Liaison aircraft	0	2	1940	1958		

== Cold War jet aircraft ==
Model	Origin	Type	Operational	Quantity	In service	Retired	Image	Details
Saab 35BS Draken	Sweden	Fighter aircraft	0	6	1972	1995		
Saab 35CS Draken	Sweden	Two-seat trainer	0	6	1972	1995		
Saab 35FS Draken	Sweden	Fighter aircraft	0	12	1976, 1984	2000		
Saab 35XS Draken	Sweden	Fighter aircraft	0	12	1975	2000		
MiG-21bis	Soviet Union	Fighter aircraft	0	20	1978	1998		
MiG-21bis	Soviet Union	Reconnaissance aircraft	0	6	1984	1998		
MiG-21F-13	Soviet Union	Fighter aircraft	0	13	1963	1986		
MiG-21F-13	Soviet Union	Reconnaissance aircraft	0	9	1984	1986		
MiG-21U	Soviet Union	Two-seat trainer	0	2	1965	1981		
MiG-21UM	Soviet Union	Two-seat trainer	0	4	1974, 1984	1998		
MiG-15UTI	Soviet Union	Two-seat trainer	0	4	1962	1977		
de Havilland Vampire Mk.52	United Kingdom	Fighter aircraft	0	6	1954	1965		
de Havilland Vampire Mk.55	United Kingdom	Two-seat trainer	0	9	1955	1965		
Folland Gnat Mk.1	United Kingdom	Fighter aircraft	0	13	1958	1974		
Fouga CM.170 Magister	France	Two-seat trainer	0	80	1958	1988		
Ilyushin Il-28	Soviet Union	Maritime surveillance, target-tug, aerial photography	0	4	1960	1981		

== World War II ==
=== Fighters ===
Model	Origin	Type	Operational	Quantity	In service	Retired	Image	Details
Brewster B-239	United States	Fighter aircraft	0	44	1940	1948		
Bristol Bulldog IIA	United Kingdom	Fighter aircraft	0	2	1940	1944		
Bristol Bulldog IVA	United Kingdom	Fighter aircraft	0	17	1935	1944		
Caudron-Renault C.R. 714	France		0	6	1940	1944		
Curtiss Hawk 75A-1 Curtiss Hawk 75A-2 Curtiss Hawk 75A-3 Curtiss Hawk 75A-4 Curtiss Hawk 75A-6	United States		0	6 9 9 7 13	1941	1948		
Curtiss P-40M Warhawk	United States		0	1	1943	1945		
Fiat G.50 "Freccia"	Italy	Fighter aircraft	0	35	1939	1946		
Fokker D.XXI	Netherlands	Fighter aircraft	0	97	1937	1948		
Gloster Gamecock II	United Kingdom		0	17	1927	1944		
Gloster Gladiator I	United Kingdom	Fighter aircraft	0	12	1940	1940		
Gloster Gladiator II	United Kingdom	Fighter aircraft	0	30	1940	1945		
Hawker Hart	United Kingdom	Fighter aircraft	0	5	1940	1940		
Hawker Hurricane I Hawker Hurricane IIA	United Kingdom		0	12 1	1940	1944		
Lavochkin LaGG-3	Soviet Union	Fighter aircraft	0	3	1942	1945		
Messerschmitt Bf 109G-2 Messerschmitt Bf 109G-6 Messerschmitt Bf 109G-8	Germany		0	48 109 2	1943	1954		
Morane-Saulnier M.S.406	France	Fighter aircraft	0	87	1940	1948		
Polikarpov I-152 (I-15bis)	Soviet Union		0	5	1940	1945		
Polikarpov I-153	Soviet Union		0	11	1940	1945		
Polikarpov I-16	Soviet Union		0	2	1940	1943		
VL Humu	Finland		0	1	1944	1945		
VL Myrsky	Finland		0	51	1944	1947		
VL Pyörremyrsky	Finland		0	1	1945	1945		

=== Bombers ===
Model	Origin	Type	Operational	Quantity	In service	Retired	Image	Details
Bristol Blenheim Mk.I	United Kingdom	Bomber aircraft	0	75	1937	1958		
Bristol Blenheim Mk.IV	United Kingdom	Bomber aircraft	0	22	1940	1958		
Dornier Do 17 Z-1 Dornier Do 17 Z-2 Dornier Do 17 Z-3	Germany		0	4 2 9	1942	1948		
Ilyushin DB-3M	Soviet Union		0	11	1940	1945		
Ilyushin DB-3F	Soviet Union		0	4	1943	1945		
Junkers Ju 88 A-4	Germany		0	24	1943	1948		
Petlyakov Pe-2 Petlyakov Pe-3	Soviet Union		0 0	7 1	1941 1943	1946 1944		
Tupolev SB 2M-103U (MV-3) "SB-3"	Soviet Union		0	24	1941	1950		
Douglas DC-2	United States		0	1	1940	1940		The Hanssin-Jukka was used as a bomber during the Winter War

=== Reconnaissance ===
Model	Origin	Type	Operational	Quantity	In service	Retired	Image	Details
Blackburn Ripon IIF	United Kingdom		0	26	1929	1944		
Fokker C.VD Fokker C.VE	Netherlands		0	2 17	1927	1945		
Fokker C.X	Netherlands	Reconnaissance and light bomber aircraft	0	39	1936	1958		
Koolhoven F.K.52	Netherlands		0	2	1940	1943		
VL Tuisku I and II	Finland		0	31	1935	1950		

=== Liaison ===
Model	Origin	Type	Operational	Quantity	In service	Retired	Image	Details
Desoutter Mk.II	United Kingdom		0	1	1941	1944		
Fairchild 24J 60 De Luxe	United States	Liaison aircraft	0	1	1939	1940		
Fieseler Fi 156K-1 Storch	Germany	Liaison aircraft	0	2	1939	1960		
Focke-Wulf Fw 58 Weihe	Germany		0	1	1943	1944		
Junkers A50 Junior	Germany		0	2	1936	1940		
Polikarpov U-2	Soviet Union		0	4	1942	1945		
Westland Lysander I	United Kingdom		0	12	1940	1946		

=== Transport ===
Model	Origin	Type	Operational	Quantity	In service	Retired	Image	Details
Douglas DC-2	United States	Transport aircraft	0	3	1940	1946		
Fokker F.VIIa	Netherlands		0	1	1941	1943		
Fokker F.VIII	Netherlands		0	1	1940	1941		
Junkers F 13	Germany		0	3	1939	1947		
Junkers W 34 Junkers K 43F	Weimar Republic		0	12	1930	1952		
Junkers Ju 52	Germany	Transport aircraft	0	2	1942			

=== Amphibious ===
Model	Origin	Type	Operational	Quantity	In service	Retired	Image	Details
Arado Ar 196	Germany	A-2, A-3, A-5	0	12	1943	1945		
Beriev MBR-2 Beriev MBR-2bis	Soviet Union		0	2 3	1941	1942		
Dornier Do 22Kl	Germany		0	4	1941	1945		
Heinkel He 59	Germany		0	4	1943	1943		
Heinkel He 115	Germany		0	3	1940	1944		
M.F. 11	Norway		0	3	1940	1944		
Shavrov Sh-2	Soviet Union		0	2	1942	1944		
VL E.30 Kotka I and II	Finland		0	6	1931	1944		

=== Trainer ===
Model	Origin	Type	Operational	Quantity	In service	Retired	Image	Details
Aero A-32 GR	Czechoslovakia	Reconnaissance and light bomber aircraft	0	16	1929	1944		
Airspeed A.S.6E Envoy	United Kingdom		0	1	1942	1943		
Avro 652A Anson I	United Kingdom	Training aircraft	0	3	1936	1947		
Bücker Bü 131 Jungmann	Germany	Training aircraft	0	2	1937			
Bücker Bü 133 Jungmeister	Germany	Training aircraft	0	1	1938			
Cessna C-37	United States	Training aircraft	0	1	1939	1944		
De Havilland D.H.60X Moth	United Kingdom	Training aircraft	0	23	1929	1944		
Focke-Wulf Fw 44 J Stieglitz	Germany		0	35	1940	1960		
Gloster Gauntlet II	United Kingdom		1	24	1940	1945		Supplied by the South African government
Hanriot H.232.2	France		0	3	1941	1945		
Jaktfalken II	Sweden		0	3	1940	1945		
Letov S 218 A Smolik	Czechoslovakia		0	39	1930	1945		
Polikarpov I-16 UTI	Soviet Union		0	1	1941	1943		
Raab-Katzenstein RK-26 Tigerschwalbe	Weimar Republic		0	1	1940	1940		Civilian donation
VL Pyry	Finland		0	41	1939	1962		
VL Sääski I and II	Finland		0	33	1928	1943		
VL Viima I and II	Finland		0	24	1936	1962		

== Inter-war years ==
Model	Origin	Type	Operational	Quantity	In service	Retired	Image	Details
Adaridi	Finland		0	1	1924	1931		
Aero A-11	Czech Republic		0	8	1927	1939		
Albatros C.III	German Empire		0	2	1919	1921		
Avro 504K	United Kingdom		0	1	1926	1930		
Breguet 14A.2	France		0	30	1919	1927		
Caudron C.59	France		0	3	1923	1931		
Caudron C.60	France		0	64	1923	1936		
Caudron G.3	France		0	19	1920	1924		
Caudron G.4	France		0	1	1922	1922		
D.F.W. C.V	German Empire		0	2	1918	1921		
Fokker D.X	German Empire		0	1	1923	1926		
Fokker D.VII	German Empire		0	3	1919	1924		
Friedrichshafen FF.33E	German Empire		0	3	1918	1923		
Friedrichshafen FF.41A	German Empire		0	1	1918	1923		
Friedrichshafen FF.49B Friedrichshafen FF.49C	German Empire		0	5	1918	1922		
Georges Levy G.L.40 HB2	France		0	12	1919	1922		
Gourdou-Leseurre GL-21 B2 Gourdou-Leseurre GL-21 B3	France		0	20	1923	1931		
I.V.L. A.22 Hansa	Finland		0	120	1922	1936		
I.V.L. C.24	Finland		0	1	1924	1924		
I.V.L. C.VI.25	Finland		0	1	1925	1925		
I.V.L. D.26 Haukka I IVL D.26 Haukka II	Finland		0 0	1 2	1927 1928	1927 1930		
IVL K.1 Kurki	Finland		0	1	1927	1927		
Junkers A 35	Weimar Republic		0	1	1928	1928		
Klemm Kl 25 D.VII R	Nazi Germany		0	3	1937	1972		
Koolhoven F.K.31	Netherlands		0	12	1926	1932		
L.V.G. C.VI	German Empire		0	2	1922	1923		Ex Swedish airline
Martinsyde F.4 Buzzard	United Kingdom		0	15	1923	1939		
Morane-Saulnier MS 50C	France		0	6	1925	1932		
N.A.B. Typ 12 Albatros N.A.B. Typ 17 Albatros Jagare N.A.B. Typ 9 Albatros SW 20 Albatros	Sweden		0	1 1 2 1	1918 1918 1918 1918	1918 1919 1923 13 Apr 1918		
Nieuport 10	Russian Empire		0	3	1918	1919		
Nieuport 11	Russian Empire		0	1	1918	1923		
Nieuport 23	Russian Empire		0	2	1918	1920		
Potez 25 A2	France		0	1	1927	1936		
Rumpler 6B1 Rumpler 6B2	German Empire		0 0	1 1	1918 1918	25 Oct 1919 1926		
Rumpler C.VIII	German Empire		0	1	1918	1925		
S.I.A.I. (Savoia) S.9	Italy		0	2	1919	1920		
Spad S.34	France		0	2	1921	1925		
Spad S.VII	France		0	1	1919	1923		
Shchetinin M-5	Russian Empire		0	1	1918	1920		
Shchetinin M-9	Russian Empire		0	9	1918	1922		
Shchetinin M-15	Russian Empire		0	2	1918	1919		
Shchetinin M-16	Russian Empire		0	6	1918	1923		
Thulin LA	Sweden		0	1	1918	1919		
Thulin typ D	Sweden		0	2	1918	1919		
VL Paarma	Finland		0	1	1931	1933		
