= Kurt Berger =

Kurt Volmar Berger (1896–1977) was an aviation engineer and the chief designer at the Finnish aircraft manufacturing company Valtion Lentokonetehtaat.

K. V. Berger's father, Arnold Berger, was a minister and his mother was Fanny Berger. He became an abiturient from Helsingin Uusi Yhteiskoulu in 1916 and began studies as an electrical engineer at the Helsinki University of Technology the same autumn, but volunteered for service with the Helsinki Jaeger Brigade.

In 1918 he traveled to Libau in Germany, to start pilot training with floater-equipped aircraft. However, his studies were interrupted by the end of World War I and Germany's loss. Berger managed to receive his international civil pilot papers in 1921.

In order to continue with his studies, he enrolled in the East London College in 1919 (nowadays called Queen Mary, University of London), graduating on 5 September 1922. He was appointed Engineer at the Finnish Air Force Headquarters at Santahamina on 1 November 1923, and later Chief Engineer on 1 March 1924. He was therefore sent to the Finnish Air Force Aircraft Manufacturers company (Ilmavoimien Lentokonetehdas), where he would design the IVL C.24, IVL Haukka I, IVL Haukka II, IVL Sääski and IVL Kotka aircraft.

Berger also participated in the Finnish Air Force's purchases of foreign fighters from Czechoslovakia, Great Britain, Italy and France in the late 1920s and 1930s.

Berger was acquitted from his position at the VL during a company restructuring in 1933 and he continued to work as aircraft inspector at Lentoasema I and Flight Regiment 2. After the Soviet-Finnish Winter War 1939–40 he supervised the assembly of the Brewster Buffalo fighters in Sweden, as well as served as Chief Engineer of Maintenance and Office Engineer at the Finnish Air Force Headquarters. After the wars he continued as a private entrepreneur.
