= Valtion lentokonetehdas =

Former finnish airplane manufactory

- Industry: Aerospace and defense
- Founded: 1928
- Defunct: 1951
- Successor: Valmet
- Headquarters: Helsinki, Finland
- Number of locations: Suomenlinna (1921–1936); Tampere (1936–1945)
- Products: Airplanes
- Owner: Finland state

Valtion lentokonetehdas (State aircraft factory) was a Finnish aircraft manufacturing company that was founded on 23 February 1928 from the IVL or I.V.L. factory (Ilmailuvoimien lentokonetehdas, Finnish Air Force Aircraft Factory), founded in 1921.

The company was transferred from being subordinate to the Finnish Air Force to being subordinate to the Ministry of Defence. The company, and its products were named with the prefix VL.

== Island factory ==
The company began its production at Suomenlinna and Santahamina in Helsinki. The factory did not have an airport, only the sea and sea ice could be used for take-off and landing. Most of the aircraft built in Helsinki were seaplanes. In Helsinki the aircraft built were small compared to the Bristol Blenheim bombers built under licence in the late 1930s. Much of the final assembly was done outdoors. The company was looking for a new production facility further away from the Soviet Union. Helsinki was seen as a bad location for an armaments factory from a strategic viewpoint.

== Expansion to Tampere ==
In 1936 the factory was moved to Härmälä, near Tampere, which was also a potential bombing target since it was the biggest industrial city in Finland. The build up of the factory and the airport around it gave work to hundreds of people in the depression of the 1930s. Politically Tampere was in the left which almost led to the factory being located to Vaasa.

During the Second World War, the VL serviced and assembled German (Junkers Ju 88) and British (Bristol Blenheim) bomber aircraft. The Tampere factory employed 665 persons in 1936 and 1,697 persons by 1941. A major part of the work of the factory was overhaul and repair of military aircraft, building new aircraft was a secondary function and the design of indigenous aircraft a tertiary function.

During the wars, the production was dispersed all over Finland to avoid destruction of the whole factory at once; the engine factory was moved to Kokkola, the woodworking factory to Kylmäkoski, stores to Viiala and Pirkkala. Other facilities were located at Pori and Kolho. The Karhumäki brothers' factory was entirely transferred under VL's supervision at the end of the war.

== Part of Valmet after WWII ==
After World War II, the Finnish state consolidated its industrial assets, and VL was integrated as part of Valtion Metallitehtaat (VMT, State Metal Works), later 'Valmet'. The ownership of the factory was moved to the ministry of trade and industry.

With the ending of World War II in 1945, the Valtion Lentokonetehdas and other state owned factories were merged into the company Valtion Metallitehtaat Lentokonetehdas (State Metal Factories, often abbreviated to V.M.T. or VMT). This company did not only focus on aircraft but on anything from general household machinery to engines.

The Finnish aircraft design declined for several years and it was not until 1951 when a new design was flown. That same year Valtion Metallitehtaat Lentokonetehdas was renamed Valmet OY Lentokonetehdas (Valmet Aircraft Factory) with its subsidiaries named Valmet Oy Tampereen tehdas ja Kuoreveden tehdas (Valmet Oy Tampere works and Kuorevesi works). The company has been renamed many times since the 1960s. In 1963 Karhumäki works at Kuorevesi became part of Valmet. Its main business was maintenance work for the Ilmavoimat (Finnish AF). In 1967 Valmet moved all its aviation activities to Kuorevesi. In 1974 Valmet OY Lentokonetehdas was renamed Valmet Lentokonetehtaat (Valmet Aviation Industries), and in 1989 Valmet Lentokonetehdas was renamed into Valmet Lentokoneteollisuus (Valmet Aircraft Industries). On September 5, 1996, Valmet became Patria Finavitec Oy.

=== Aircraft ===
==== Ilmailuvoimien Lentokonetehdas ====
- IVL A.22 Hansa (Hansa-Brandenburg W.33)
- IVL C.24
- IVL C.25
- Caudron C.60

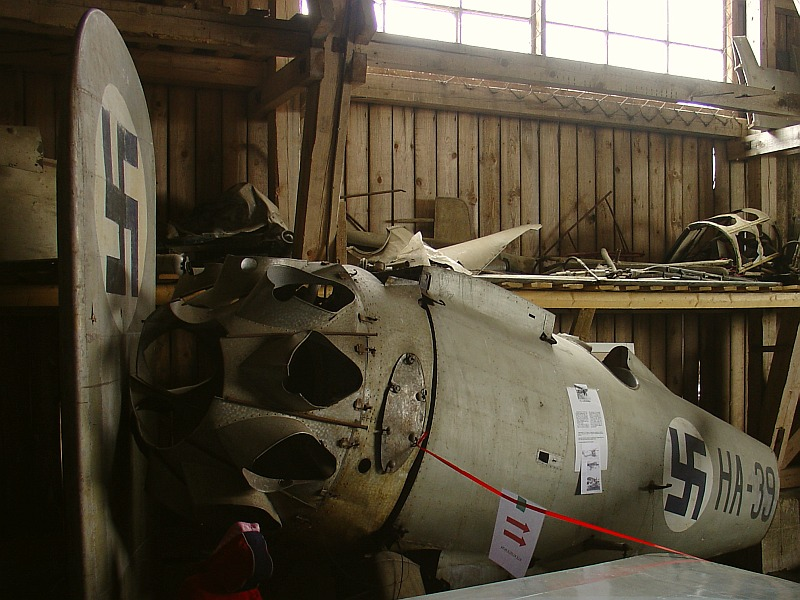
The remains of a Haukka at the Päijänne Tavastia Aviation Museum

- IVL D.26 Haukka I
- IVL K.1 Kurki

==== Valtion Lentokonetehdas ====
- VL D.27 Haukka II
- VL Sääski (Mosquito)
- Koolhoven FK.31
- VL E.30 Kotka
- VL F.30 Paarma
- Letov Š-218 Smolik
- VL Tuisku
- VL Viima
- VL Pyry
- VL Myrsky
- VL Humu

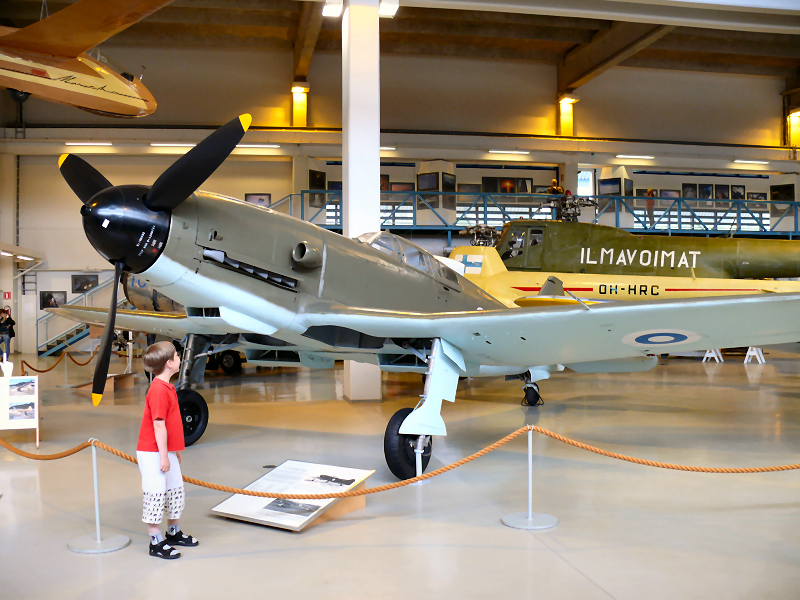
The Pyörremyrsky at the Aviation Museum of Central Finland

- VL Pyörremyrsky

licence built

- Blackburn Ripon
- Bristol Blenheim
- de Havilland Moth
- Fokker C.X
- Fokker D.XXI
- Gloster Gamecock

==== Valmet ====
- Valmet Vihuri
- Valmet Tuuli
- Fouga CM 170R Magister
- Valmet L-70 Miltrainer Vinka
- BAE Hawk
- Valmet L-80 Turbo-Vinha
- Valmet PIK-23 Towmaster
- Valmet L-90TP Redigo

licence built

- Saab 35 Draken
- BAE Hawk
- F-18C Hornet
