= D27 =

D27 may refer to:

== Ships ==
- ARA Comodoro Py (D-27), a Gearing-class destroyer of the Argentine Navy
- Brazilian destroyer Pará (1959), a Pará-class destroyer of the Brazilian Navy
- Brazilian destroyer Pará (1989), a Garcia-class destroyer of the Brazilian Navy
- HMS Charger (D27), an escort carrier briefly commissioned into the Royal Navy
- HMS Walker (D27), a W-class destroyer of the Royal Navy

== Other uses ==
- D27 road (Croatia)
- Dewoitine D.27, a French monoplane fighter aircraft
- GER Class D27, a class of steam locomotives
- Progress D-27, a Ukrainian propfan engine
- VL D.27 Haukka II, a Finnish fighter aircraft
- LNER Class D27, a class of British steam locomotives
- GER Class D27, a class of British steam locomotives
