= Päijänne Tavastia Aviation Museum =

Aviation museum in Asikkala, Finland

Coordinates: 61°8′40″N 25°41′13″E

Päijänne Tavastia Aviation Museum (Finnish: Päijät-Hämeen ilmailumuseo) is an aviation museum in Asikkala, near Lahti, Finland. It opened in its current form on 19 May 2006. The museum was previously known as Vesivehmaan varastohalli (the Vesivehmaa storage hall).

The museum displays mainly aircraft of the Finnish Air Force. In 1948, the Finnish Air Force began separating and storing some of the aircraft that had been taken out of service. The aircraft were stored in hangar 4 on former World War II air force base of Vesivehmaa (presently known as Lahti-Vesivehmaa airport, EFLA). They also had a large number of older aircraft in storage. By the end of the 1940s, many of the World War II-era aircraft were sold as scrap. During the late 1970s the aircraft were moved to their current location in hangar 1.

The museum is run by "Lahden ilmasilta" (LIS). This guild association, which was founded on 15 November 1962, wanted to preserve the aircraft that remained, which numbered about 20. The museum has about 2,000 visitors per year.

== On display ==
Former aircraft of the Finnish Air Force

- Blackburn Ripon IIF - the only complete Ripon left
- Folland Gnat Mk.1
- Fouga Magister CM 170
- MiG-15 UTI
- MiG-21bis
- Mil Mi-8P
- Saab 35 Draken

Finnish Air Force aircraft, which have not been restored

- Aero A-32
- Caudron C.59
- Caudron-Renault CR.714
- Vampire Mk.55
- I.V.L. D.26 Haukka I
- VL E.30 Kotka II

Civil aircraft, which have not been restored

- I.V.L. K.1 Kurki
- Republic RC-3 Seabee
- Kassel 12A

== Gallery ==
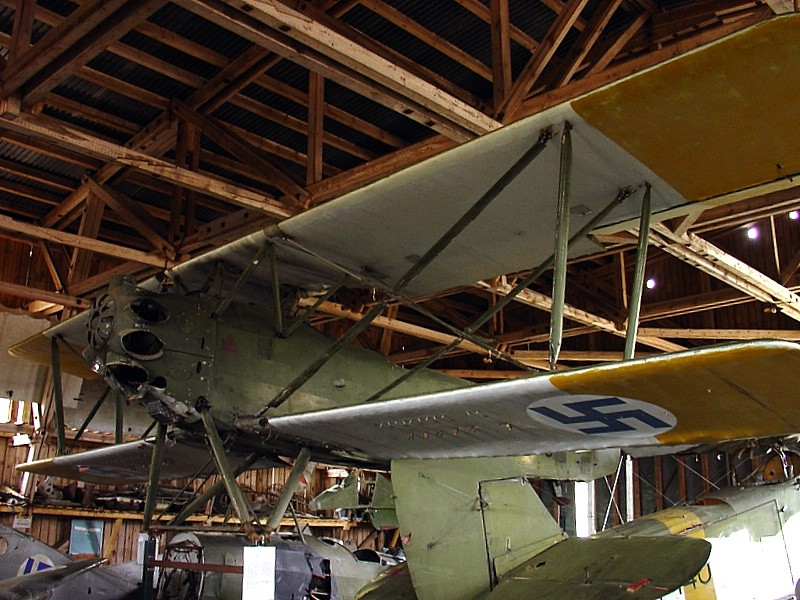
Aero A-32 GR Jupiter, AEj-59

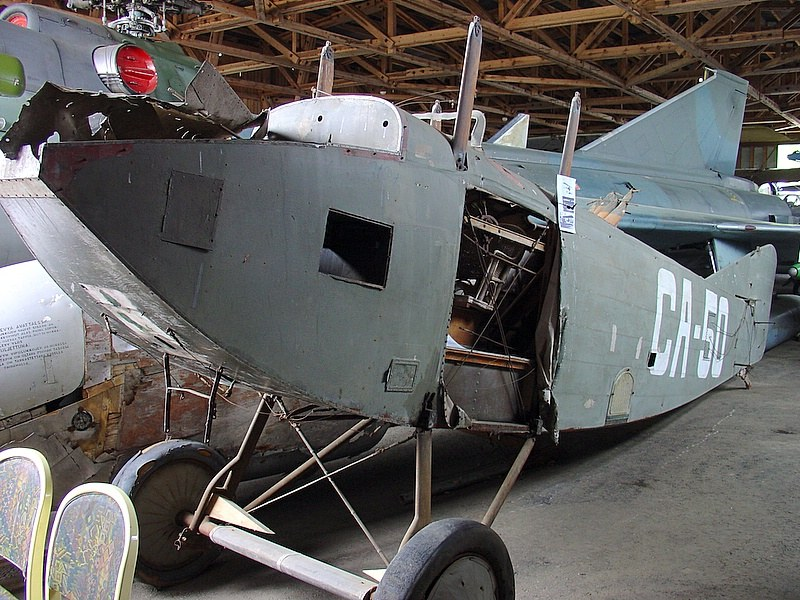
Caudron C.59, CA-50

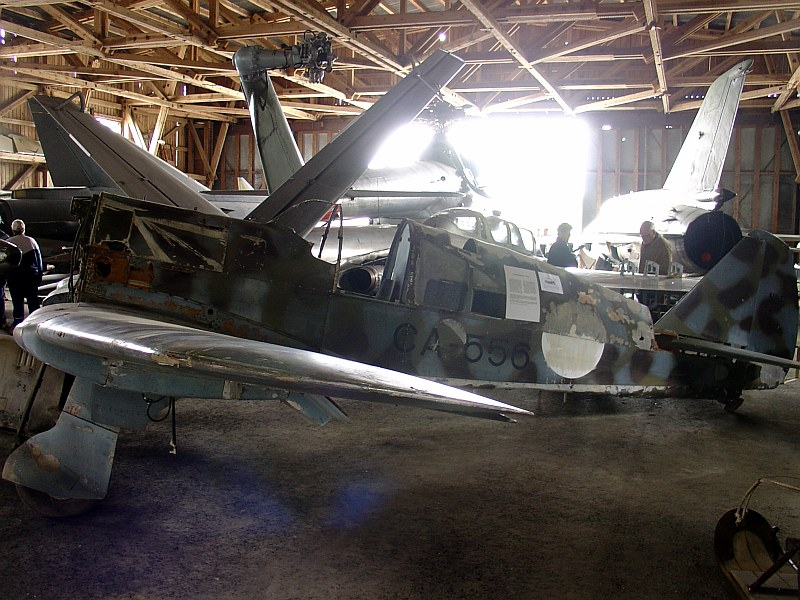
Caudron-Renault C.R. 714, CR-556

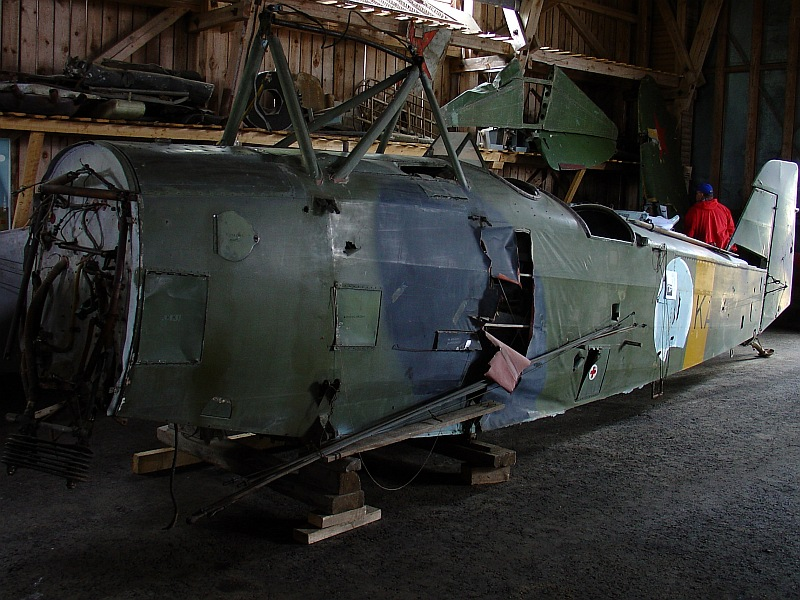
VL E.30 Kotka II, KA-147

== See also ==
- List of aviation museums
