= IVL C.VI.25 =

1920s Finnish fighter aircraft

C.VI.25
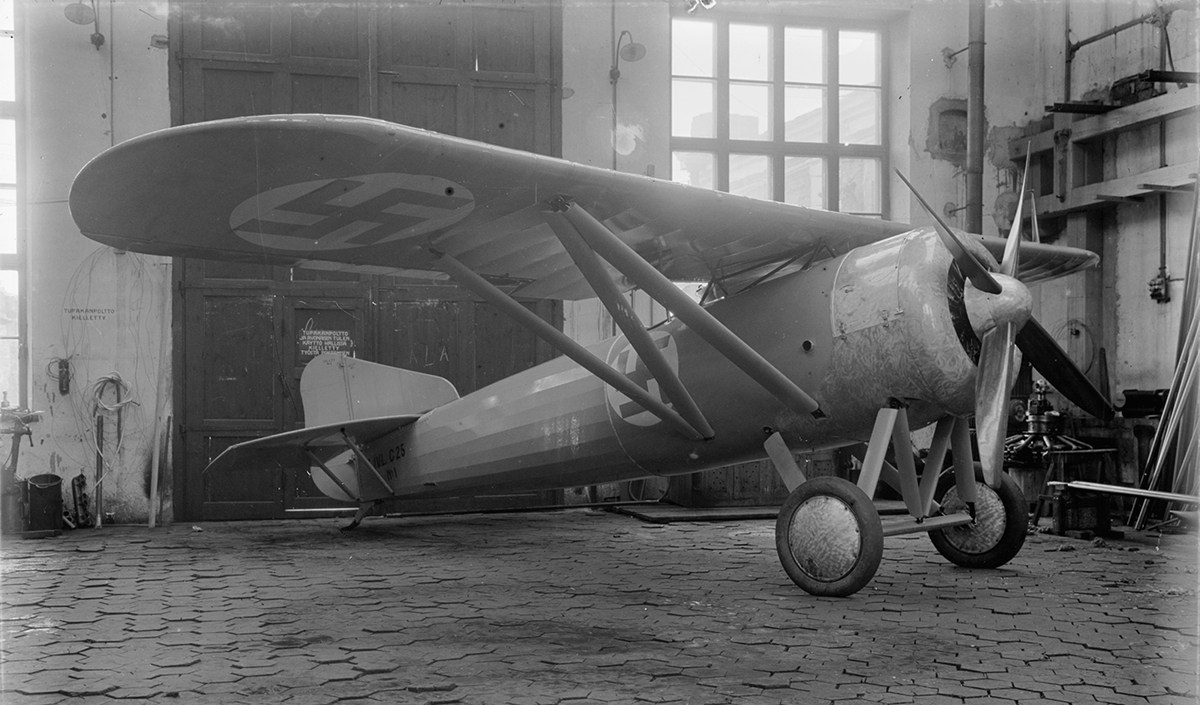

General information
- Type: Fighter aircraft
- Manufacturer: IVL
- Status: Destroyed on December 17, 1925
- Primary user: Finnish Air Force
- Number built: 1

History
- First flight: June 11, 1925
- Developed from: IVL C.24

IVL C.VI.25 was a Finnish fighter aircraft designed by IVL. It was a further development of the IVL C.24.

The aircraft made its maiden flight on June 11, 1925. The aircraft was wrecked after a forced landing, due to engine trouble, on December 17, 1925.

The aircraft was under-powered, like its predecessor, and it was not considered possible to further develop the aircraft.

== Operators ==
Finland

- Finnish Air Force

== Specifications (C.VI.25) ==
Data from Thulinista Hornetiin – 75 vuotta Suomen ilmavoimien lentokoneita

General characteristics

- Crew: 1
- Length: 6.9 m (22 ft 8 in)
- Wingspan: 9.5 m (31 ft 2 in)
- Max takeoff weight: 843 kg (1,858 lb)
- Powerplant: 1 × Siemens-Halske Sh.IIIA air-cooled geared rotary piston engine, 119 kW (160 hp)
- Propellers: 4-bladed wooden fixed-pitch propeller

Performance

- Maximum speed: 210 km/h (130 mph, 110 kn)

== See also ==
Related lists

- List of aircraft of the Finnish Air Force
- List of fighter aircraft
