= Torolf Eklund =

Finnish aircraft designer

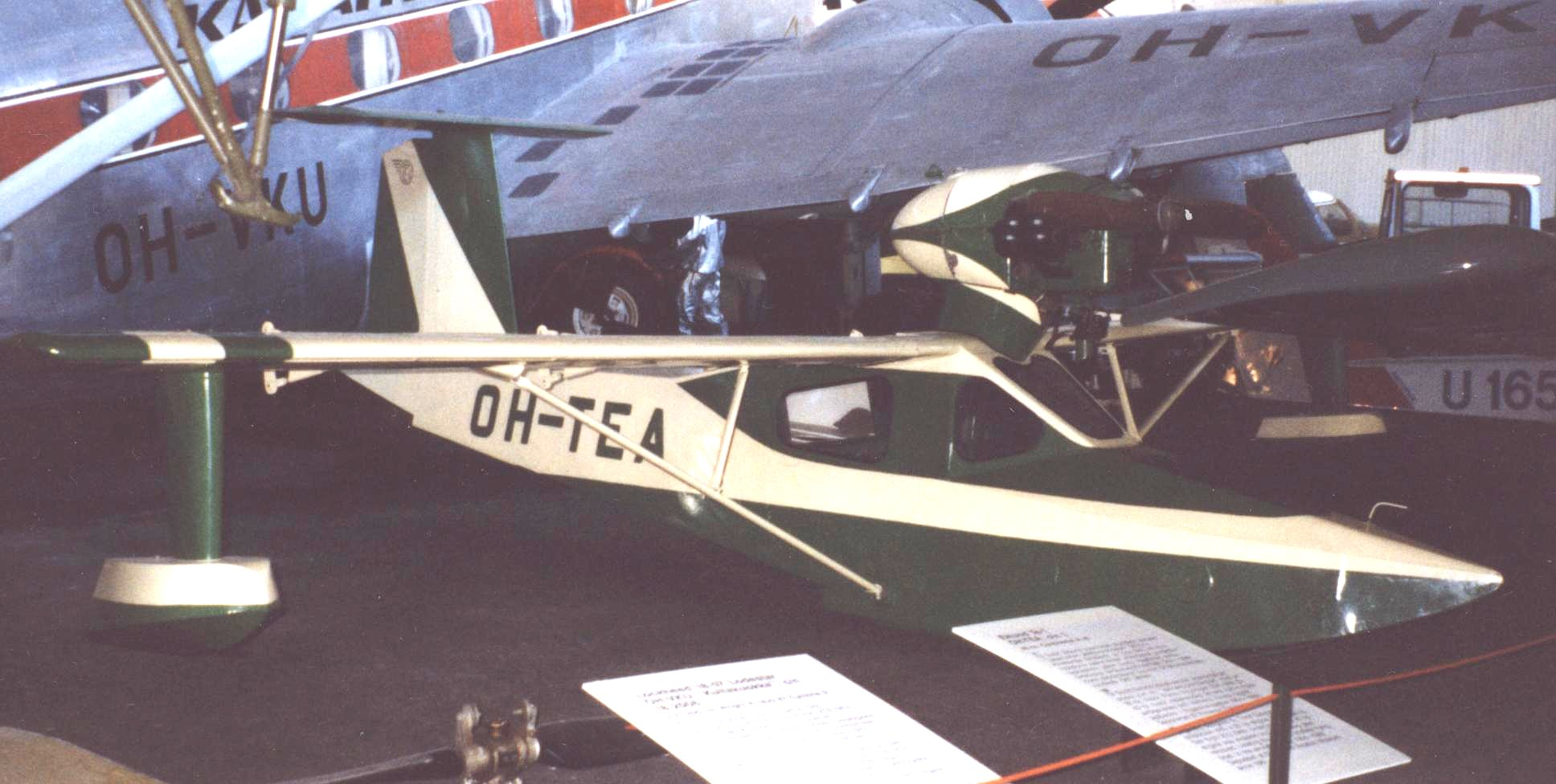

Torolf Eklund (13 April 1912 – 12 December 2000) was a Finnish aircraft designer, who worked at the Valtion lentokonetehdas between 1935 and 1962. He privately designed and built his own small single-seat flying boat, the Eklund TE-1, in the late 1940s.

He was born in Helsinki. He graduated from the Helsinki University of Technology with a master's degree in aviation during the 1930s. As a student he formed the aviation club Polyteknikkojen Ilmailukerho, which still exists today.

He was a reserve officer in the Finnish Air Force and was working for the aircraft industry during World War II. Eklund was also the chairman for the Finnish Aviation Engineer's Club between 1953 and 1954.

Eklund was also the designer of the Valmet Tuuli aircraft.

== Sources ==
Ilmojen halki I-II, Karisto, Hämeenlinna, 1974.
