= Kassel 12 =

German single-seat glider, 1935

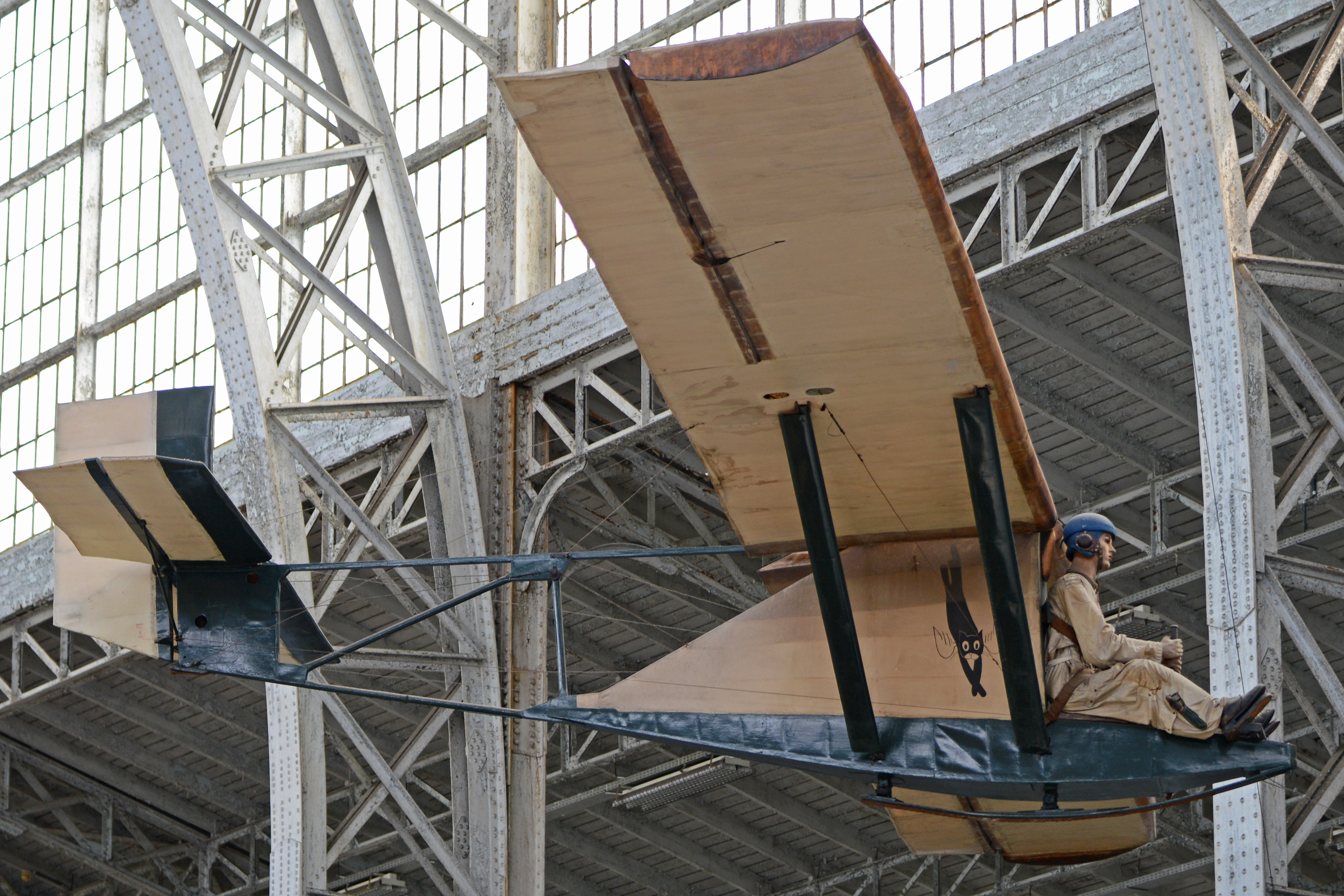

General information
- Type: Training glider
- National origin: Germany
- Manufacturer: Segelflugzeugbau Kassel

History
- First flight: 28 March 1935

The Kassel 12 was a German glider used for training, developed in the 1920s. It was a minimalist design with the pilot sitting atop a tapered wooden structure that supported a high wing on a set of struts, and carried a conventional empennage at the rear. A spring skid was provided as undercarriage.

== Operators ==
=== Finland ===
Conscripts from Lentoasema 2 built one Kassel 12A in 1935. The first flight with the aircraft was performed by Lt. Col. Ahonius at Santahamina on 28 March 1935. The aircraft was used at the Jämijärvi glider school in the summer of 1936, carrying the designation number "13". The aircraft is today on display at the Päijänne Tavastia Aviation Museum in Asikkala, near Lahti.

== Specifications ==
General characteristics

- Crew: One pilot
- Length: 6.50 m (21 ft 4 in)
- Wingspan: 10.00 m (32 ft 10 in)
- Height: 2.20 m (7 ft 3 in)
