= Saab 91 Safir =

Swedish trainer aircraft

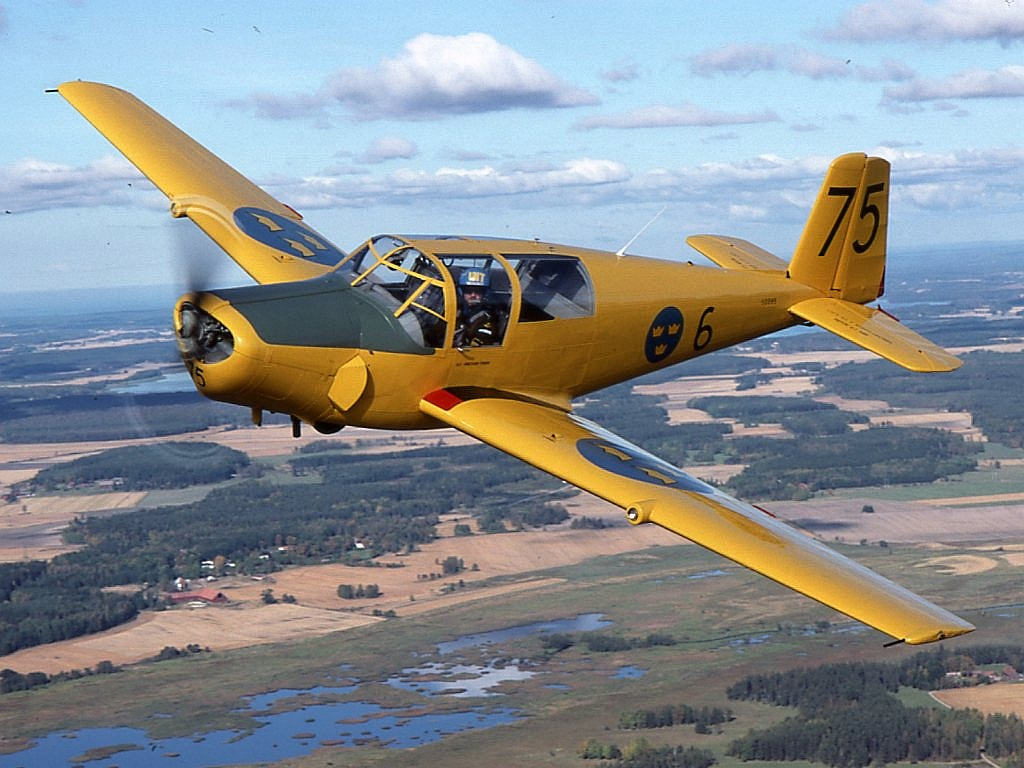
- Saab 91C of the Swedish Air Force

General information
- Type: Trainer
- National origin: Sweden
- Manufacturer: Saab
- Designer: A J Andersson
- Primary user: Swedish Air Force
- Number built: 323

History
- Manufactured: 1946–1966
- First flight: 20 November 1945

The Saab 91 Safir (Swedish for sapphire) is a three (91A, B, B-2) or four (91C, D) seater, single engine trainer aircraft. The Safir was built by Saab AB in Linköping, Sweden (203 aircraft) and by De Schelde in Dordrecht, Netherlands (120 aircraft).

== Design and development ==
Development of the Safir began in 1944 as part of a plan to compensate for reductions in orders for military aircraft, in anticipation of the end of the Second World War. Three major civil programmes were planned, the Type 90 Scandia airliner, the Type 91 Safir light aircraft and the Saab 92 motor car. The Safir was designed by Anders J. Andersson, who had previously worked for Bücker, where he had designed the all-wood Bücker Bü 181 "Bestmann". The Safir thus shared many conceptual design features with the Bestmann. It was primarily of metal construction, although it did have fabric-covered control surfaces. Development was slowed by the need to concentrate on more urgent military work, and by industrial action among suppliers. The Safir's first flight took place on 20 November 1945.

While the prototype was first powered by a 130 hp (97 kW) four cylinder de Havilland Gipsy Major IC piston engine, the Saab 91A initial production model used a 145 hp (108 kW) Gipsy Major 10. The Gipsy-engine Safir was considered underpowered by military customers, and as a result, the Gipsy was replaced by a six-cylinder Lycoming O-435A rated at 190 hp (140 kW), with the re-engined type becoming the Saab 91B, flying on 18 January 1949. The Saab 91C, first flying in September 1953, retained the O-435 engine, but has a revised four-seat cabin. The 91D replaced the O-435 with a lighter four-cylinder Lycoming O-360-A1A engine rated at 180 hp (130 kW).

As well as its primary role as a trainer/touring aircraft, the Safir was used as an aerodynamic testbed. The first prototype was used as a platform for low speed testing of the swept wing for Saab 29 jet fighter, and was later further modified to test the wing for the Saab 32 Lansen fighter. In addition, one ex-Swedish aircraft was sold to Japan, going through a variety of modifications to test high-lift devices for the Shin Meiwa PS-1 flying boat.

== Operational history ==
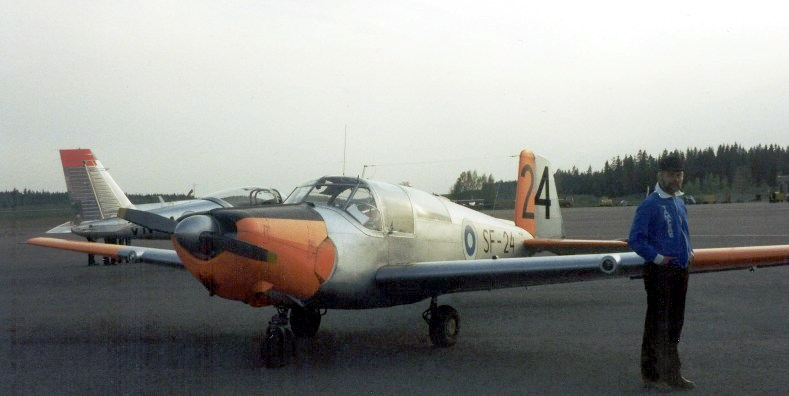
Finnish Saab 91D Safir

Production of the Saab 91A began in 1946, but sales were slow owing to the large numbers of cheap ex-military trainers for sale after the end of the Second World War. Major users of the 91A were the Swedish and Ethiopian Air Forces. In 1951, Sweden ordered 74 91B trainers to replace its remaining Bestmanns, but Saab was busy building J29 Tunnan fighters, so production of the Saab 91B was moved to the Dutch company De Schelde at their Dordrecht factory. De Schelde continued building the Safir until 1955, completing a total of 120 Saab 91B and 91Cs.

Saab restarted production of the Safir at its Linköping factory in 1954, building 25 Saab 91B-2s for Norway, 30 Saab 91Cs, all for military customers, and 99 Saab 91Ds. Production continued until 1966, when the last Safir, a Saab 91C for Ethiopia, was completed. Total production was 323 aircraft including the prototype.

The Safir was used by the Swedish, Norwegian, Finnish, Austrian, Tunisian, and Ethiopian air forces as a trainer aircraft, and a single aircraft was used by the Japan Defense Agency as an STOL test platform. The type remained in Norwegian and Finnish service until the late 1980s, and in Austria until 1992. While it was replaced as a trainer by the Scottish Aviation Bulldog in Sweden in 1971, it remained in use as a liaison aircraft, still being in service in 1994.

Major civilian users were Air France, Lufthansa and the Dutch Rijksluchtvaartschool (RLS) on the Groningen Airport Eelde, near Groningen.

During development of the Saab 29, the initial Saab 91 prototype was modified with a scaled-down version of the Saab 29's swept wings; this aircraft was designated Saab 201 Experimental Aircraft. This same airframe was later fitted with wings designed for the Saab 32 Lansen; this was designated Saab 202.

A single Saab 91 Safir was modified as the Saab X1G for research in Japan.

== Variants ==
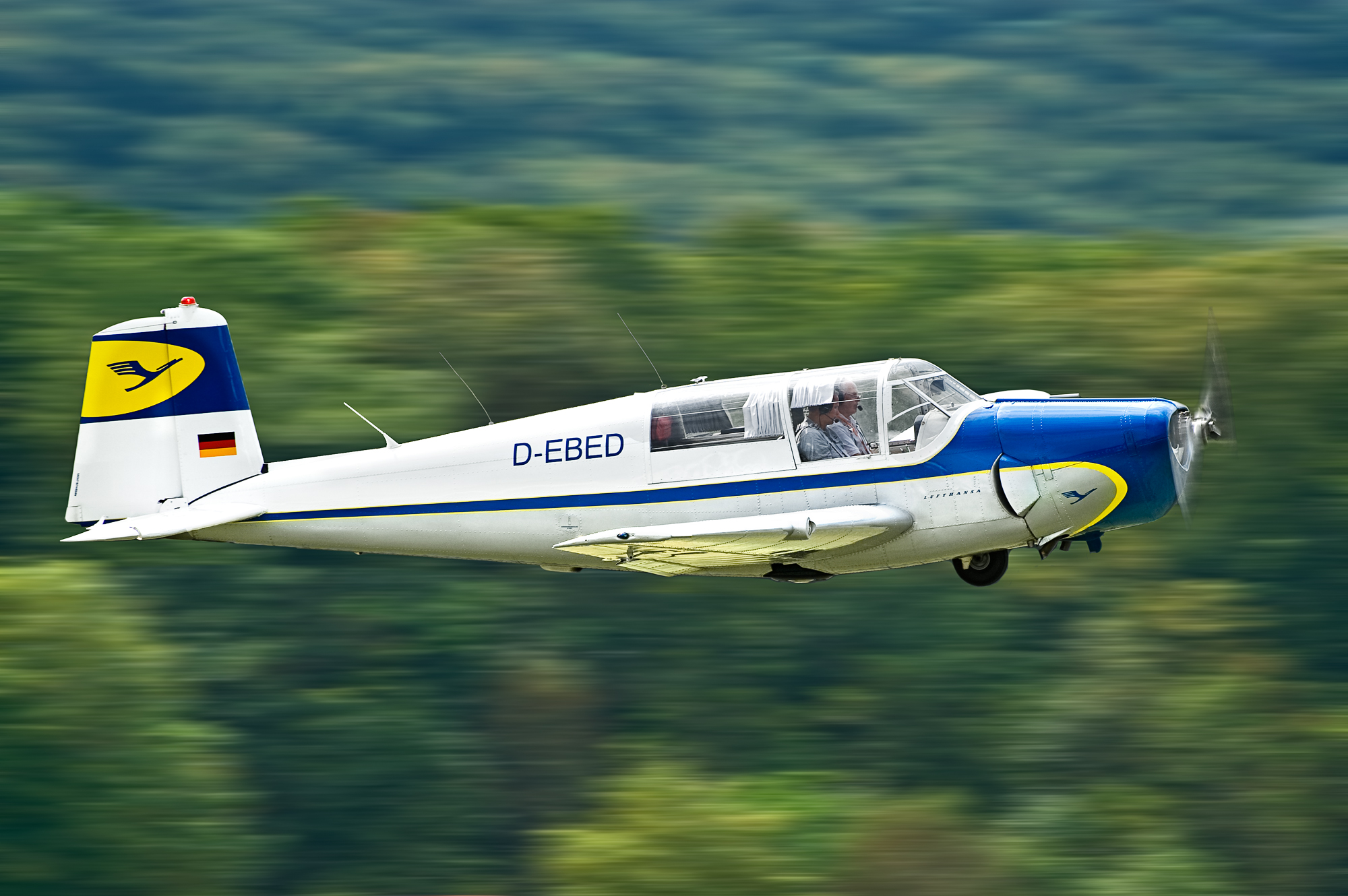
Saab Safir 91B trainer taking off from Hahnweide airfield

- 91A – Original production version, powered by 145 hp (108 kW) de Havilland Gipsy Major 10 engine. Three seats. 48 built. Swedish Air Force designation Tp 91.
- 91B – Three seat version with 190 hp (140 kW) Lycoming O-435. 106 built by De Schelde. Swedish Air Force designation Sk 50B.
- 91B-D - Improved 91B. Three built by De Schelde.
- 91B-2 – 91B variant for Royal Norwegian Air Force with minor modifications, mainly a constant speed propeller. 25 built by Saab for Norway.
- 91C – Four seat version of 91B, with fuel tanks moved to the wings, and a constant speed propeller. Eleven built by De Schelde and 30 by Saab. Swedish Air Force designation Sk 50C.
- 91D – Four-seat version, powered by 180 hp (130 kW) Lycoming O-360 engine driving a constant speed propeller. 99 built by Saab.

== Operators ==
=== Military operators ===
Austria

- Austrian Air Force - received 24 Saab 91Ds from 1964. Remained in service until 1992.

Ethiopia

- Ethiopian Air Force - received 16 Saab 91As from 1947, 8 91Bs and 16 91Cs. Some still remained in service in the early 1980s.

Finland

- Finnish Air Force - 35 Saab 91Ds and 1 91B. Withdrawn from use in late 1980s.
- Finnish Frontier Guard Former operator

Japan

- Technical Research and Development Institute

Norway

- Royal Norwegian Air Force - received 25 Saab 91B-2s from 1956 and 5 ex-Swedish Air Force 91Bs.

Sweden

- Swedish Air Force - received 20 91As, 76 91Bs and 14 91Cs.

Tunisia

- Tunisian Air Force - received one 91B-D and 14 91Ds.

=== Civil operators ===
Australia
France

- Air France

Germany

- Lufthansa

Indonesia

- Politeknik Penerbangan Indonesia Curug

Netherlands

- RLS

Paraguay

- Paraguayan Aeroclub

United Kingdom

- Kelvin Hughes - one 91-C (G-ANOK) used as a development and test aircraft.

== Specifications (91A) ==
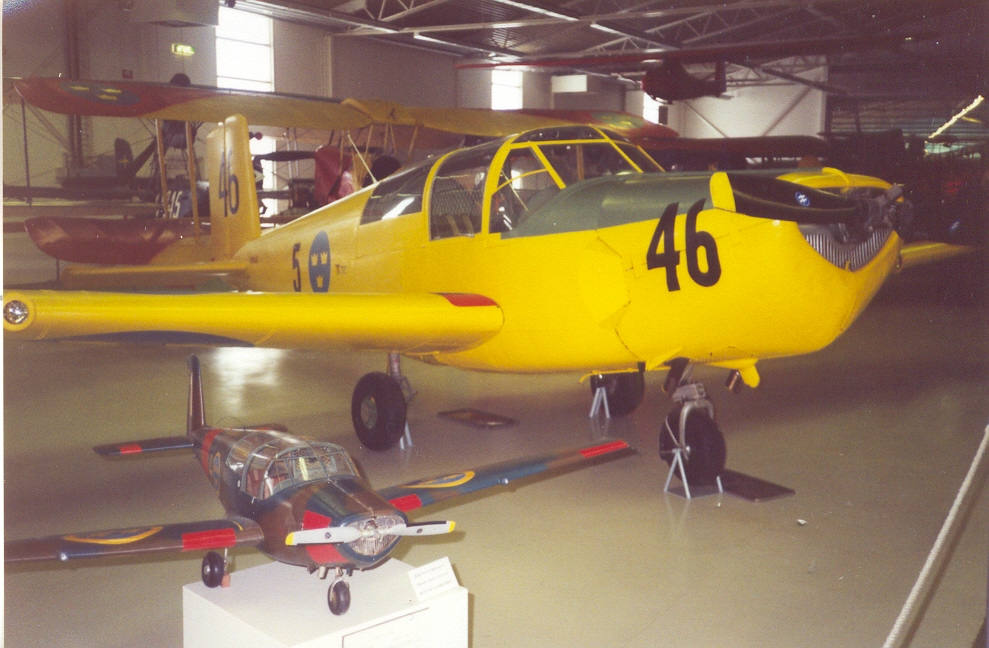
Saab 91B "Safir"

Data from Jane's All the World's Aircraft 1958-59, Safir in the Air

General characteristics

- Crew: 1
- Capacity: 2 passengers
- Length: 7.8 m (25 ft 7 in)
- Wingspan: 10.6 m (34 ft 9 in)
- Height: 2.2 m (7 ft 3 in)
- Wing area: 13.6 m^{2} (146 sq ft)
- Aspect ratio: 8.3
- Airfoil: root: NACA 23018; tip: NACA 4412
- Empty weight: 580–610 kg (1,279–1,345 lb)
- Gross weight: 955 kg (2,105 lb)
- Max takeoff weight: 1,075 kg (2,370 lb)
- Fuel capacity: 110 L (29 US gal; 24 imp gal) with 25 L (6.6 US gal; 5.5 imp gal) reserve
- Powerplant: 1 × de Havilland Gipsy Major X 4-cylinder, 108 kW (145 hp)
- Propellers: 2-bladed fixed or variable-pitch propeller

Performance

- Maximum speed: 265 km/h (165 mph, 143 kn)
- Cruise speed: 235 km/h (146 mph, 127 kn) economical cruise

248 km/h (154 mph; 134 kn) max cruise

- Stall speed: 85 km/h (53 mph, 46 kn)
- Range: 960 km (600 mi, 520 nmi)
- Service ceiling: 4,600 m (15,100 ft)
- Rate of climb: 5 m/s (980 ft/min)
- Wing loading: 73.2 kg/m^{2} (15.0 lb/sq ft) at normal loaded weight
- Power/mass: 0.1049 kW/kg (0.0638 hp/lb)

== See also ==
Aircraft of comparable role, configuration, and era

- Bücker Bü 181
- DHC-1 Chipmunk
- T-34 Mentor
- Valmet Tuuli
