= Caudron C.60 =

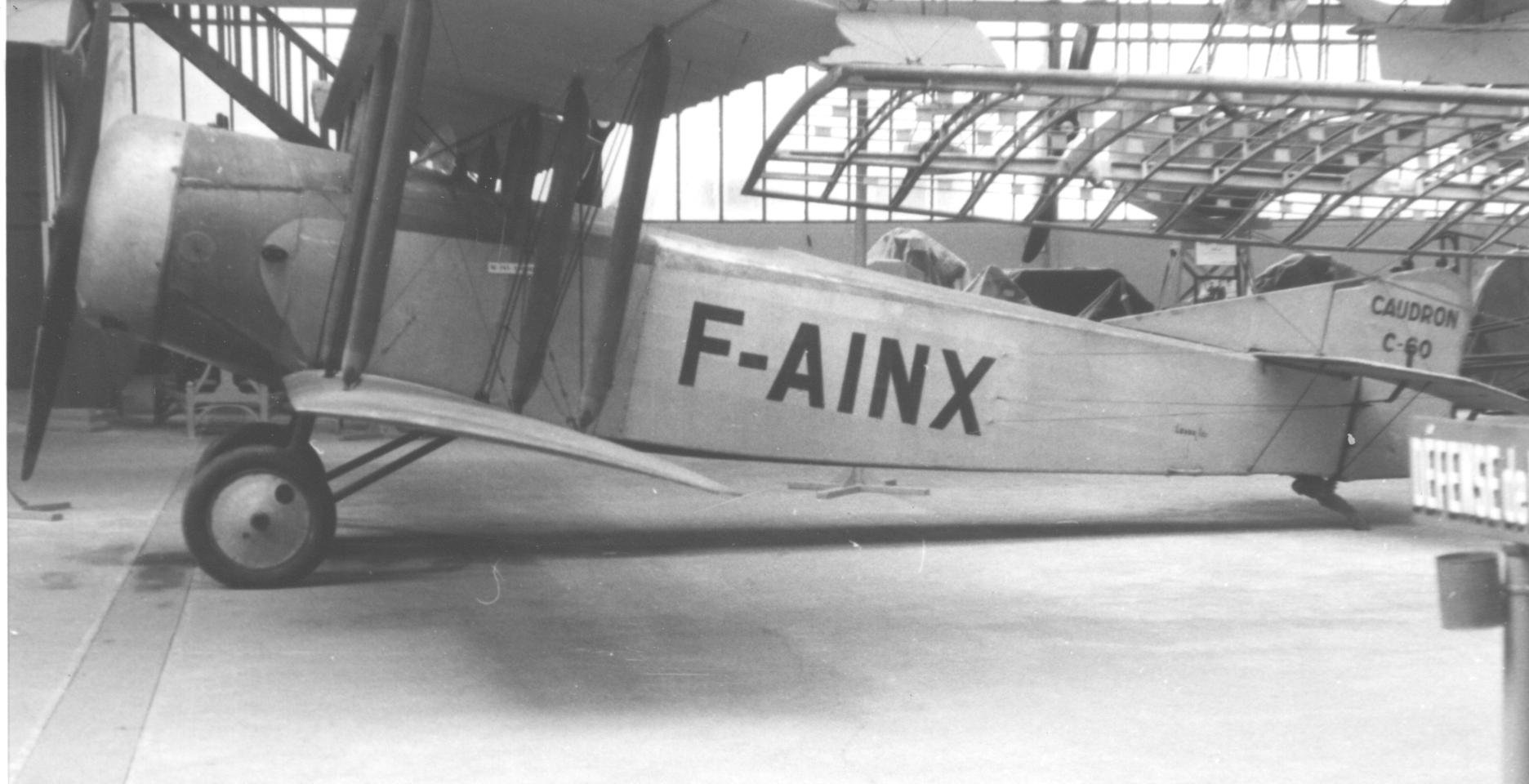
- Caudron C.60 at St-Cyr-l'Ecole airfield, Paris, in May 1957

General information
- Type: Training aircraft
- Manufacturer: Caudron
- Primary users: French Air Force Finnish Air Force; Latvian Navy; Venezuelan Air Force; Spanish Republican Air Force

History
- Developed from: Caudron C.59

The Caudron C.60 was a French two-seat biplane of the 1920s and 1930s with a single engine and a canvas-covered fuselage. The French aircraft manufacturer Caudron developed this aircraft from the Caudron C.59. It was mainly used as a trainer aircraft.

The Caudron C.60 was used in France, Finland, Latvia, and in Venezuela.

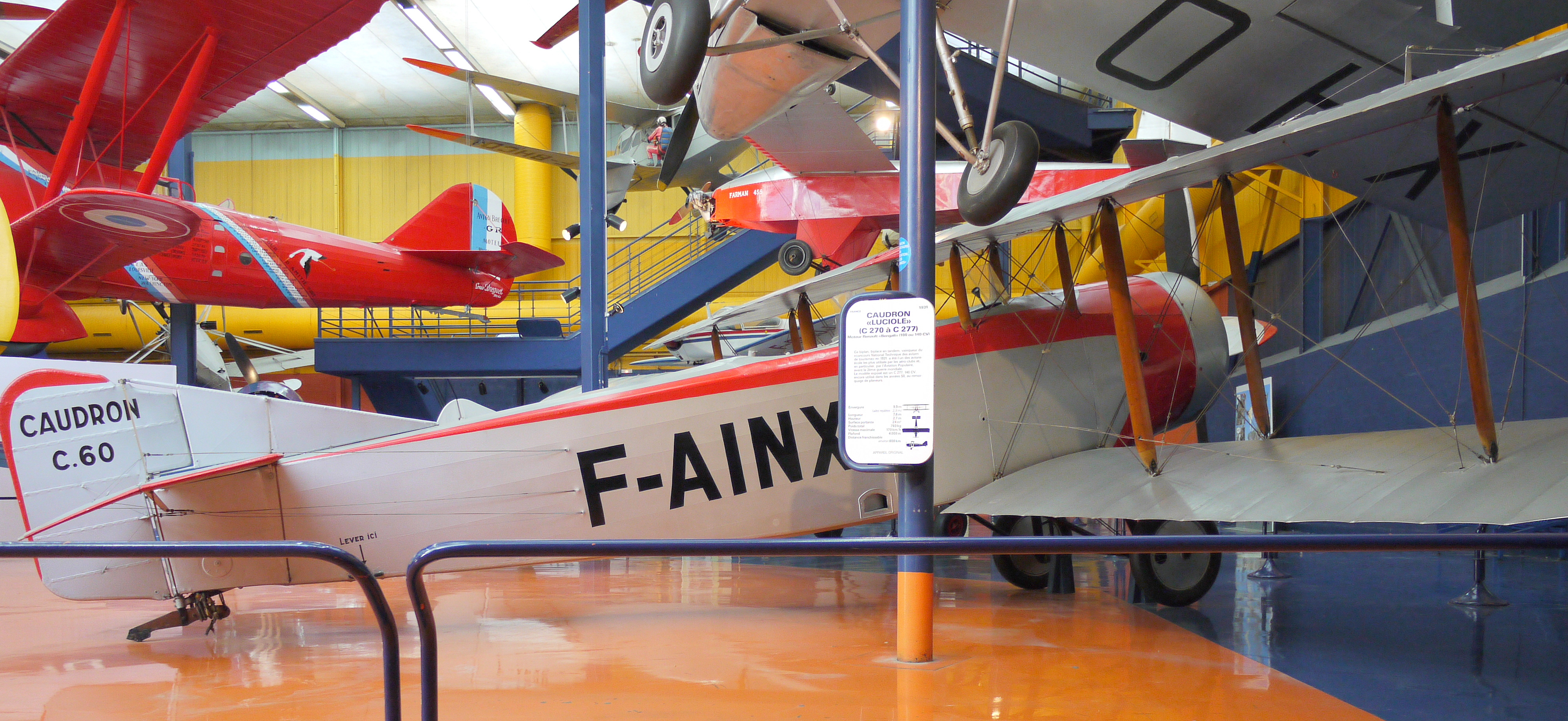
A Caudron C.60 at the Musée de l'Air in Le Bourget

== Operational history ==
The 1921 Michelin Cup for the fastest time over a 3,000-kilometre (1,864 mi) circuit of France was won by a C.60 flown by Alphonse Poiré, with a time of 37 1/4 hours.

=== Finland ===
The Finnish Air Force purchased 30 Caudron C.60s from France in 1923–1924. A further 34 aircraft were license-built in Finland 1927–1928. The Finnish Air Force had a total of 64 Caudron C.60s. The French-manufactured aircraft carried the codes 1E20–1E30 and 1F31–1F49, and later CA-20–CA-49. The Finnish-manufactured ones carried the codes CA-61–CA-94.

The aircraft were in use 1923–1936.

== Operators ==
Finland

- Finnish Air Force

France

- French Air Force

Latvia

- Latvian Navy

Spain

- Spanish Republican Air Force

Venezuela

- Venezuelan Air Force

== Survivors ==
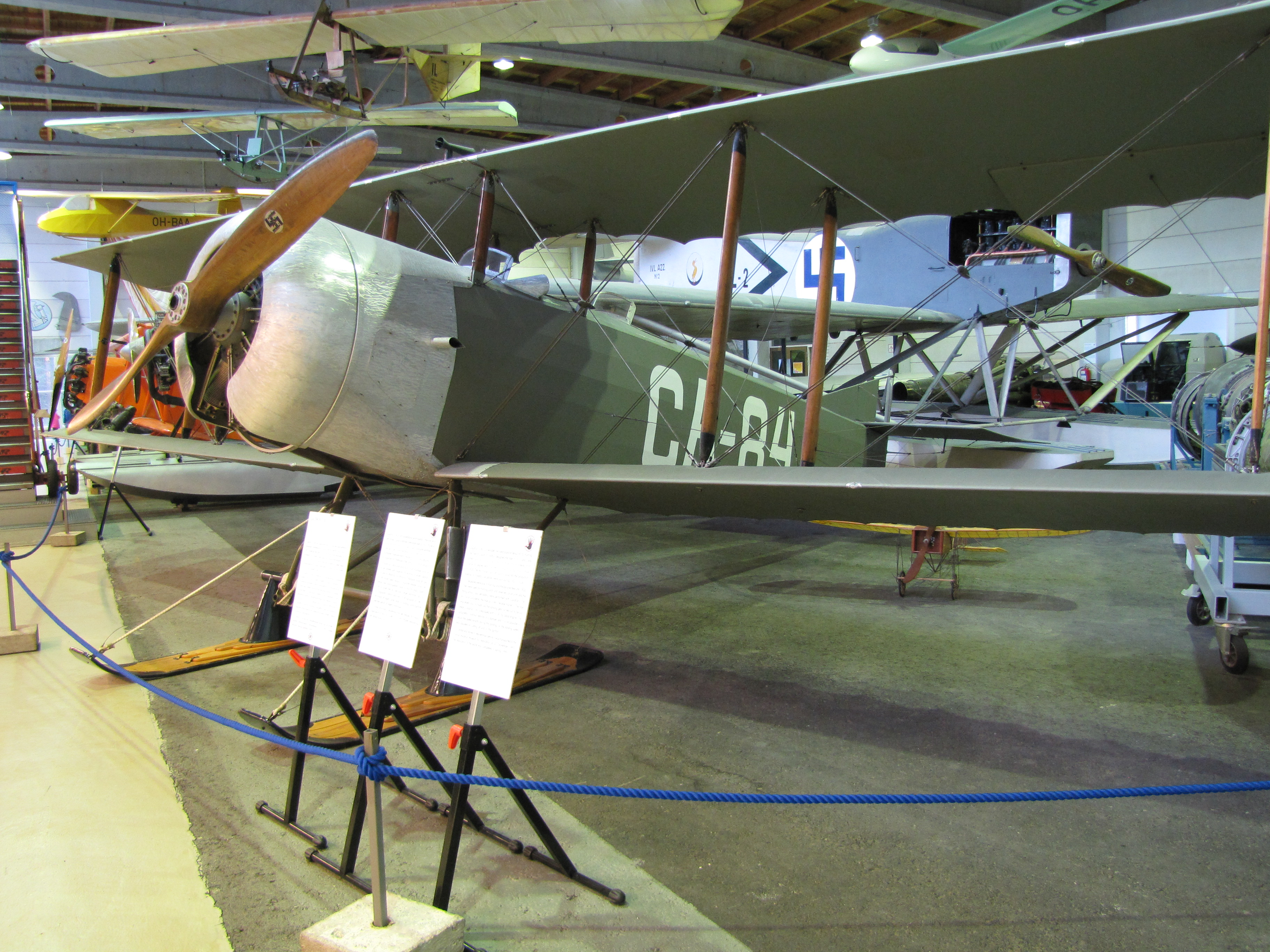
Caudron C.60 trainer in the Finnish Aviation Museum.

The Finnish Aviation Museum in Vantaa has one of the Finnish-manufactured C.60s (CA-84)

A Caudron C.60 (F-AINX) is visible at the Musée de l'Air et de l'Espace (le Bourget, France).

== Specifications (C.60) ==
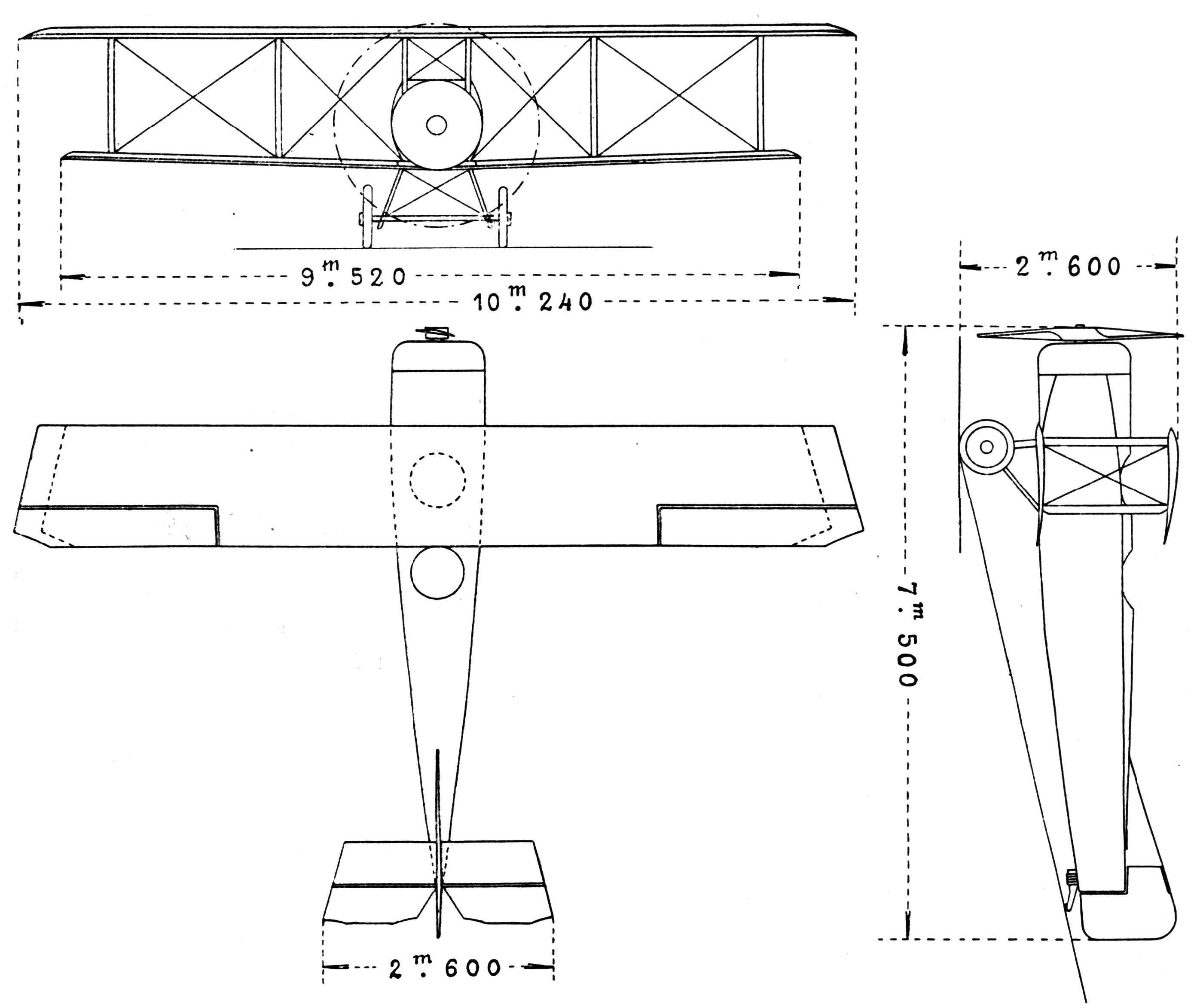
Caudron C.60 3-view drawing from L'Aerophile September,1921

Data from Suomen ilmavoimien lentokoneet, Aviafrance:Caudron C.60, Jane's all the World's Aircraft 1924

General characteristics

- Crew: 2
- Length: 7.5 m (24 ft 7 in)
- Upper wingspan: 10.24 m (33 ft 7 in)
- Lower wingspan: 9.52 m (31 ft 3 in)
- Height: 2.6 m (8 ft 6 in)
- Wing area: 26 m^{2} (280 sq ft)
- Empty weight: 505 kg (1,113 lb)
- Max takeoff weight: 862 kg (1,900 lb)
- Powerplant: 1 × Clerget 9B 9-cylinder air-cooled rotary piston engine, 97 kW (130 hp)
- Propellers: 2-bladed fixed-pitch propeller

Performance

- Maximum speed: 150 km/h (93 mph, 81 kn)
- Endurance: 5 hours
- Service ceiling: 4,000 m (13,000 ft)
- Time to altitude: 4,000 m (13,000 ft) in 36 minutes
- Wing loading: 33 kg/m^{2} (6.8 lb/sq ft)
- Power/mass: 0.1129 kW/kg (0.0687 hp/lb)

== See also ==
Related lists

- List of interwar military aircraft
- List of military aircraft of France
- List of aircraft of the Finnish Air Force
