= Caudron C.59 =

French biplane (1922–1924)

C.59
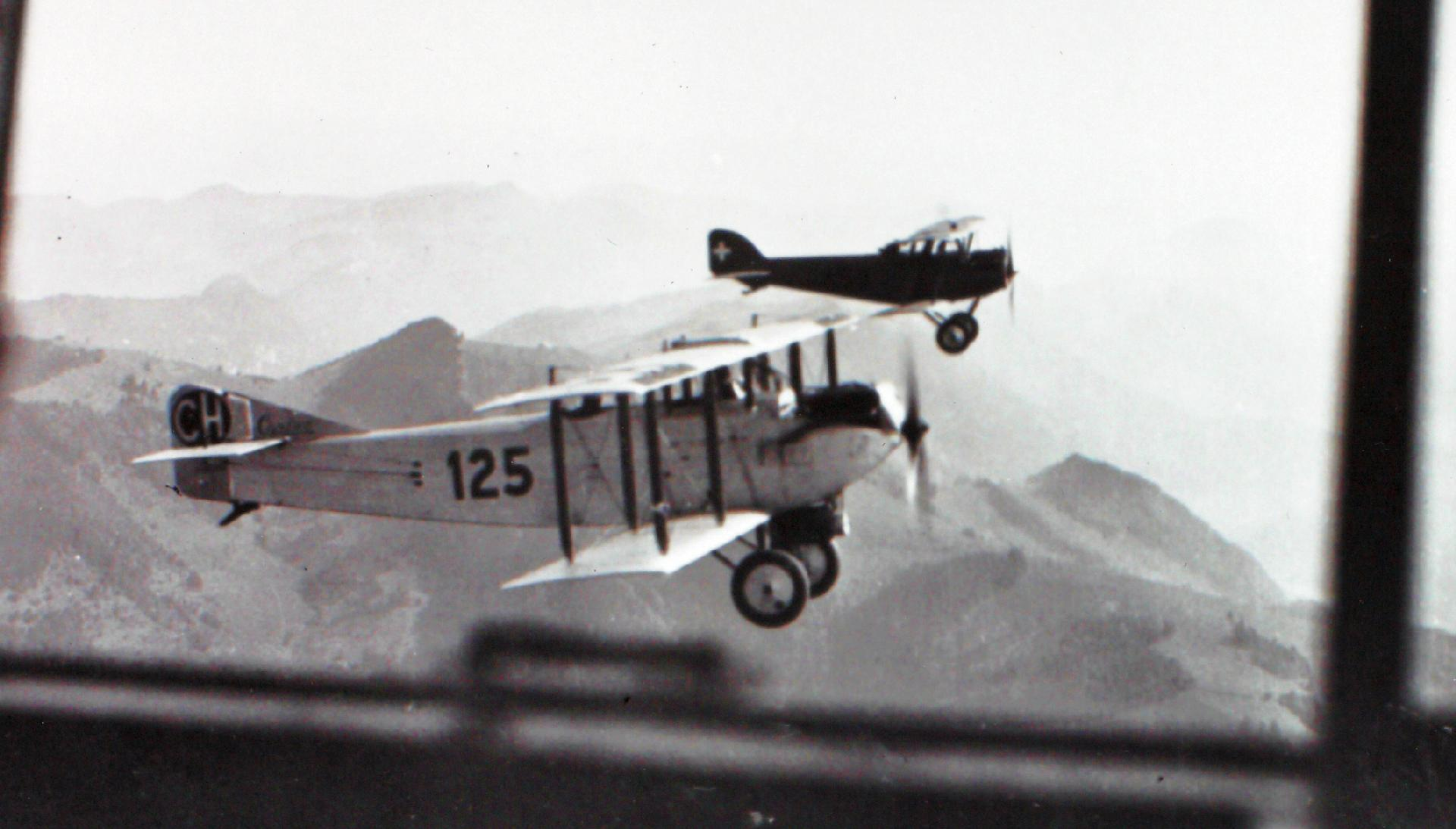
- A C.59 (foreground) in flight with a Häfeli DH-5

General information
- Type: Multi-purpose aircraft
- Manufacturer: Caudron
- Primary users: French Air Force Bulgarian Air Force; Turkish Air Force; Finnish Air Force
- Number built: 1,800+

History
- Manufactured: 1922–1924
- Introduction date: 1922
- First flight: August 1921
- Variant: Caudron C.60

The Caudron C.59 was a French, two-seat biplane with a single engine and a canvas-covered fuselage, produced between 1922 and 1924. Suitable for a variety of roles, more than 1,800 Caudron C.59s were manufactured.

== Operational history ==
The Caudron C.59 was used in a variety of countries, including: France, Bulgaria, China, Finland, Turkey and in the Spanish Civil War.

=== Finland ===
The Finnish Air Force purchased three Caudron C.59s from France in 1923. The aircraft first carried the air force designation codes 2E3-2E5 and from 1927 on CA-48 – CA-50. The manufacturing numbers of the aircraft were 5407–5409. The aircraft were equipped with wheel landing gear, but at least one aircraft (2E3) was fitted with floats. The aircraft were accepted into service on March 8, 1923, and the last one was taken out of service in 1931.

== Variants ==
C.59
Original design.
59/2
Fitted with 230 hp (170 kW) Lorraine 7Ma Mizar radial engine.
C.77
Single-seat basic trainer version; intended for 1923 ET.1 competition
C.320
c.1932, Original C.59s but refitted with 250 hp (190 kW) Renault 9A 9-cylinder radial engine. Some later returned to their original Hispano engines.

== Surviving aircraft ==
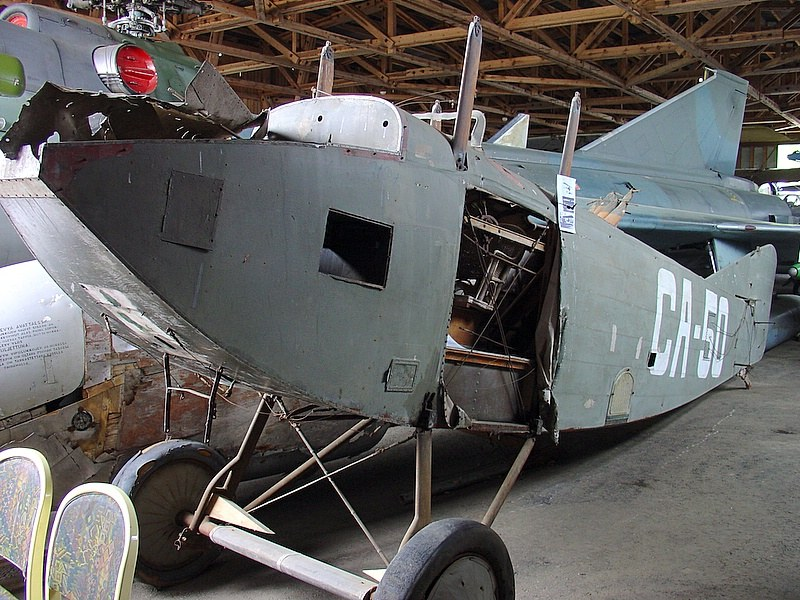
The surviving C.59

Päijänne Tavastia Aviation Museum in Asikkala, Finland has one Caudron C.59 in storage.

== Operators ==
Argentina

- Argentine Air Force

Brazil

- Brazilian Air Force

Bulgaria

- Bulgarian Air Force

(Taiwan) China

- Chinese Nationalist Air Force

France

- French Air Force
- French Navy

Finland

- Finnish Air Force

Portugal

- Portuguese Air Force

Romania

- Romanian Air Force

Spain

- Spanish Republican Air Force

Spanish State

- Spanish Air Force

Turkey

- Turkish Air Force

Venezuela

- Venezuelan Air Force

== Specifications (C.59) ==
Data from Jane's all the World's Aircraft 1928, Suomen ilmavoimien lentokoneet

General characteristics

- Crew: 2
- Length: 7.8 m (25 ft 7 in)
- Wingspan: 10.24 m (33 ft 7 in)
- Height: 2.9 m (9 ft 6 in)
- Wing area: 26 m^{2} (280 sq ft)
- Empty weight: 700 kg (1,543 lb)
- Gross weight: 988 kg (2,178 lb)
- Powerplant: 1 × Hispano-Suiza 8Ab V-8 water-cooled piston engine, 130 kW (180 hp)
- Propellers: 2-bladed wooden fixed pitch propeller

Performance

- Maximum speed: 180 km/h (110 mph, 97 kn)
- Endurance: 3 hours 30 minutes
- Wing loading: 38.5 kg/m^{2} (7.9 lb/sq ft)
- Power/mass: 0.13476 kW/kg (0.08197 hp/lb)

== See also ==
Related lists

- List of interwar military aircraft
- List of aircraft of the Spanish Republican Air Force
