= IVL K.1 Kurki =

K.1 Kurki
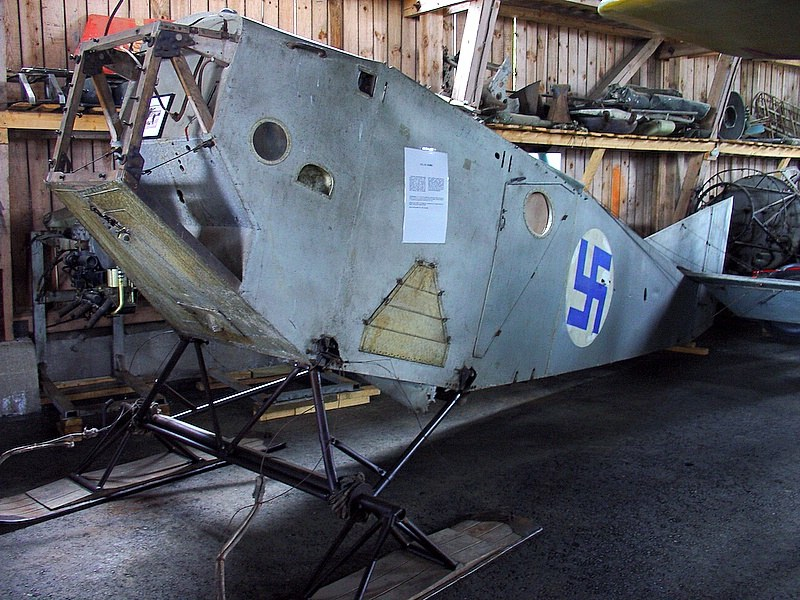

General information
- Type: Trainer aircraft
- Manufacturer: Ilmailuvoimien lentokonetehdas
- Primary user: Finnish Air Force
- Number built: 1

History
- First flight: March 30, 1927

The IVL K.1 Kurki was a prototype for a four-seated, high-wing trainer aircraft, which was designed in 1927 by IVL. The designer was Asser Järvinen and the prototype was manufactured at the IVL plant at Suomenlinna. The aircraft made its maiden flight on March 30, 1927. Only one aircraft was manufactured.

The aircraft was both over weight and too heavy in the front. It had poor flight characteristics. The Finnish Air Force only flew the aircraft 13 hours.

== Surviving aircraft ==
Päijät-Häme Aviation museum has stored the only Kurki manufactured.

== Operators ==
Finland

- Finnish Air Force

== Specifications (K.1) ==
Data from Thulinista Hornetiin – 75 vuotta Suomen ilmavoimien lentokoneita

General characteristics

- Crew: 1
- Length: 7.5 m (24 ft 7 in)
- Wingspan: 12.3 m (40 ft 4 in)
- Empty weight: 660 kg (1,455 lb)
- Powerplant: 1 × Siemens-Halske Sh 12 9-cylinder air-cooled radial piston engine, 90 kW (120 hp)
- Propellers: 2-bladed fixed-pitch propeller

Performance

- Maximum speed: 140 km/h (87 mph, 76 kn)

== See also ==
Related lists

- List of aircraft of the Finnish Air Force
