= VL Viima =

Biplane trainer

Viima
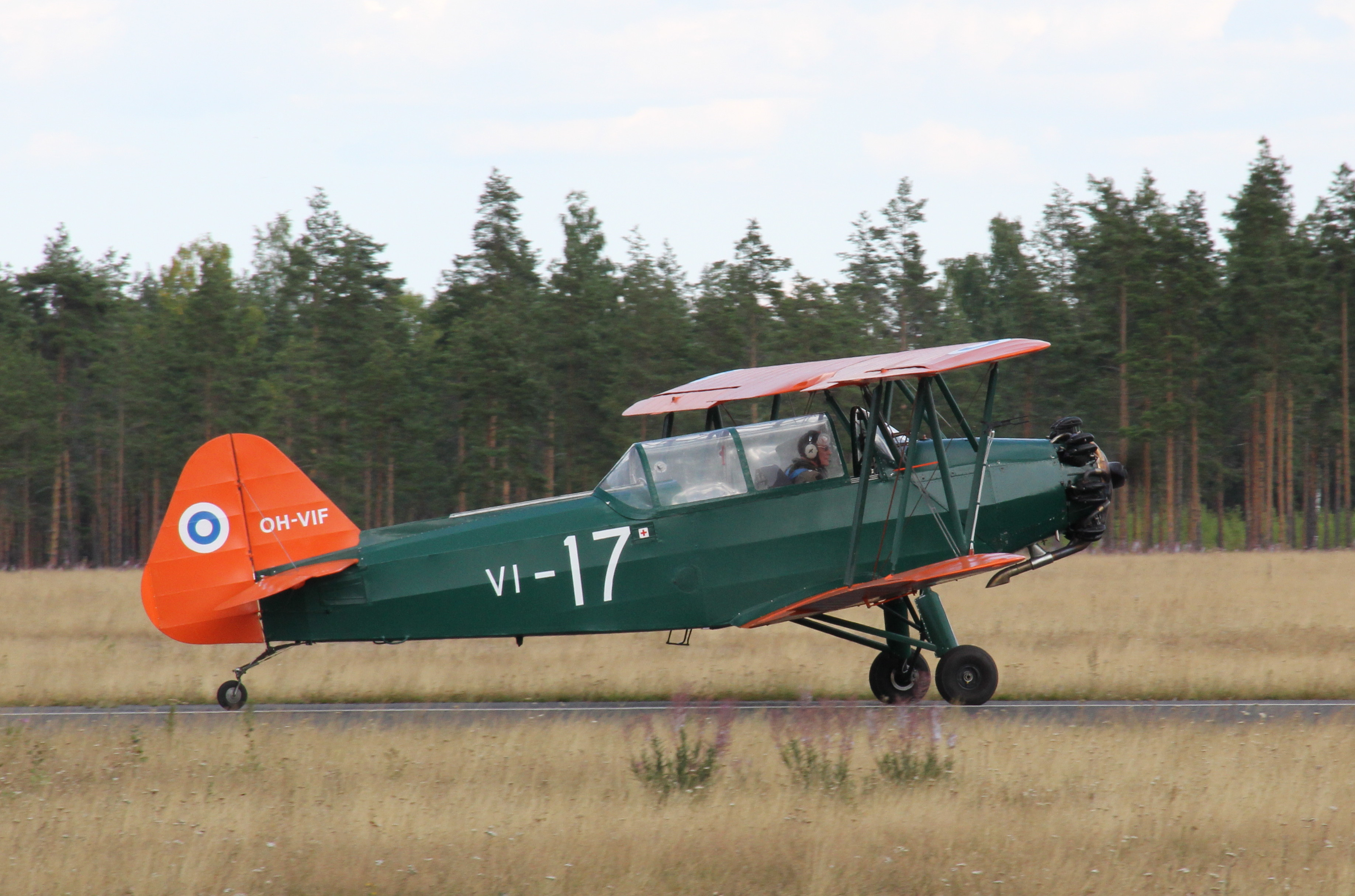
- VL Viima II at Oripää Airshow 2013

General information
- Type: Basic trainer
- National origin: Finland
- Manufacturer: Valtion Lentokonetehdas
- Status: Two listed airworthy, several on static display
- Primary user: Finnish Air Force
- Number built: 24

History
- First flight: 11 November 1936
- Retired: May 1960 (Finnish Air Force)

The VL Viima, constructed by the State Aircraft Factory (Finnish: Valtion lentokonetehdas or VL) is a Finnish two-seat, biplane trainer used by the Finnish Air Force from the late 1930s to the early 1960s. After military service, several were released into civil use.

== Design ==
The Viima II is a single engined, tandem seater biplane. Viima means Gale in English. Post war, VL was eventually absorbed into Valmet, so the aircraft is often referred to as the Valmet Viima. It has unequal span, staggered single bay wings built around two box spars with plywood ribs. The interplane struts are N-shaped. The wings are fabric covered and carry four ailerons in all; the upper and lower ailerons are externally linked.

The fuselage and tail unit are constructed of chrome-molybdenum steel and are fabric covered. The tailplane, mounted on top of the fuselage, is wire braced to the small triangular fin. Both the fin and the tailplane are adjustable when on ground. The deep, wide chord rudder reaches to the bottom of the fuselage between the divided elevators. The rudder carries a trim tab and the elevators a Flettner flap.

The cockpits are close together, the forward one is at mid-chord with a cut-out in the upper wing to enhance visibility. Dual controls are fitted. The undercarriage is of the split axle type, with the faired main legs attached to the fuselage forward of the wings and braced by rearward struts. It uses low pressure tyres and rubber in compression springing. A tailwheel is fitted. The Viima is powered by an uncowled Siemens-Halske Sh 14 radial engine.

All Viimas of the Finnish Air Force were fitted with a framed cockpit in 1950s.

== Operational history ==
24 Viimas served with the Finnish Air Force until the early 1960s. Most were then sold to civilian use, with 14 appearing on the Finnish aircraft register.

== Versions ==
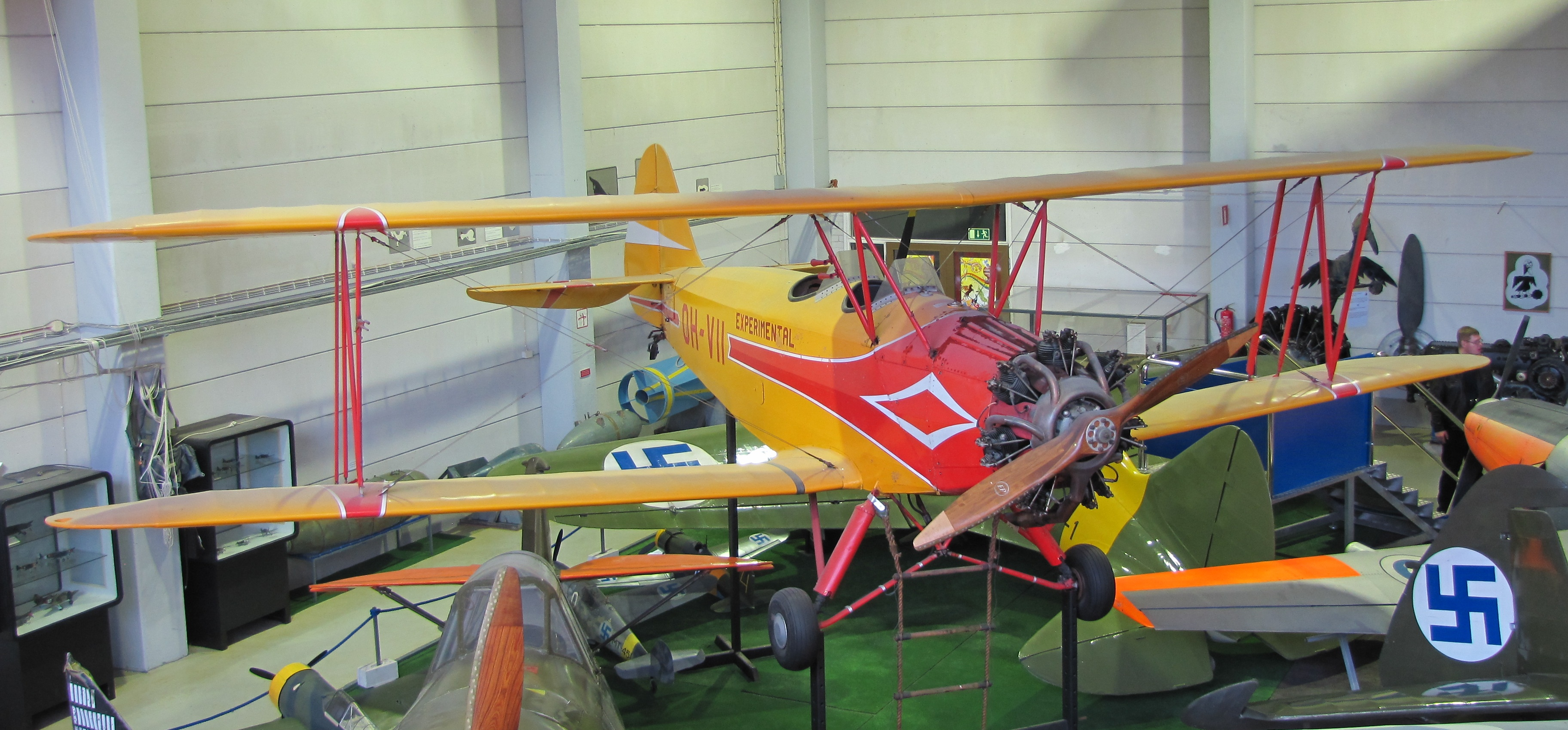
VL Viima II in Finnish Aviation Museum, Vantaa

Viima I was a prototype aircraft, of which two aircraft were made. The third Viima I was the first aircraft of the series production version.

Viima II was the series production version of the trainer aircraft. 20 aircraft were built for the FAF. Another two were delivered to the Finnish Air Defence Guild.

Viima IIB was powered by a de Havilland Gipsy Major.

== Operators ==
Finland

- Finnish Air Force

== Surviving aircraft ==
There are two Viimas on display in Finland, one in Finnish Aviation Museum in Vantaa (VI-23/OH-VII) and second one in Härmälä, Tampere (VI-1).

One airworthy Finnish Viima was sold first to England and from there to Belgium in the autumn of 2006.

Two Viimas are listed on a national register as airworthy as of 1 Jan 2014, OH-VIF (VI-17) and D-EVVI (VI-3) in Finland and Germany, respectively. D-EVVI was offered for sale at airport "ETSA" in December 2014 through planecheck.com

June 2015 .D-EVVI (VI-3) now re-registered and flying in Finland as OH-VIG.

== Specifications (VL Viima II) ==
Data from Heinonen & Valtonen 2010, pp. 104–107

General characteristics

- Crew: 2
- Length: 7.35 m (24 ft 1 in)
- Wingspan: 9.20 m (30 ft 2 in)
- Height: 2.73 m (8 ft 11 in)
- Wing area: 20 m^{2} (220 sq ft)
- Empty weight: 555 kg (1,224 lb)
- Gross weight: 875 kg (1,929 lb)
- Powerplant: 1 × Siemens-Halske Sh 14A 7-cylinder single row radial, air cooled, 110 kW (150 hp)

Performance

- Maximum speed: 186 km/h (116 mph, 100 kn)
- Cruise speed: 167 km/h (104 mph, 90 kn)
- Range: 500 km (310 mi, 270 nmi)
- Service ceiling: 3,700 m (12,100 ft)
- Time to altitude: 15 min to 2000 m
- Wing loading: 44 kg/m^{2} (9.0 lb/sq ft)
