= Valmet Tuuli =

1950s Finnish military trainer aircraft

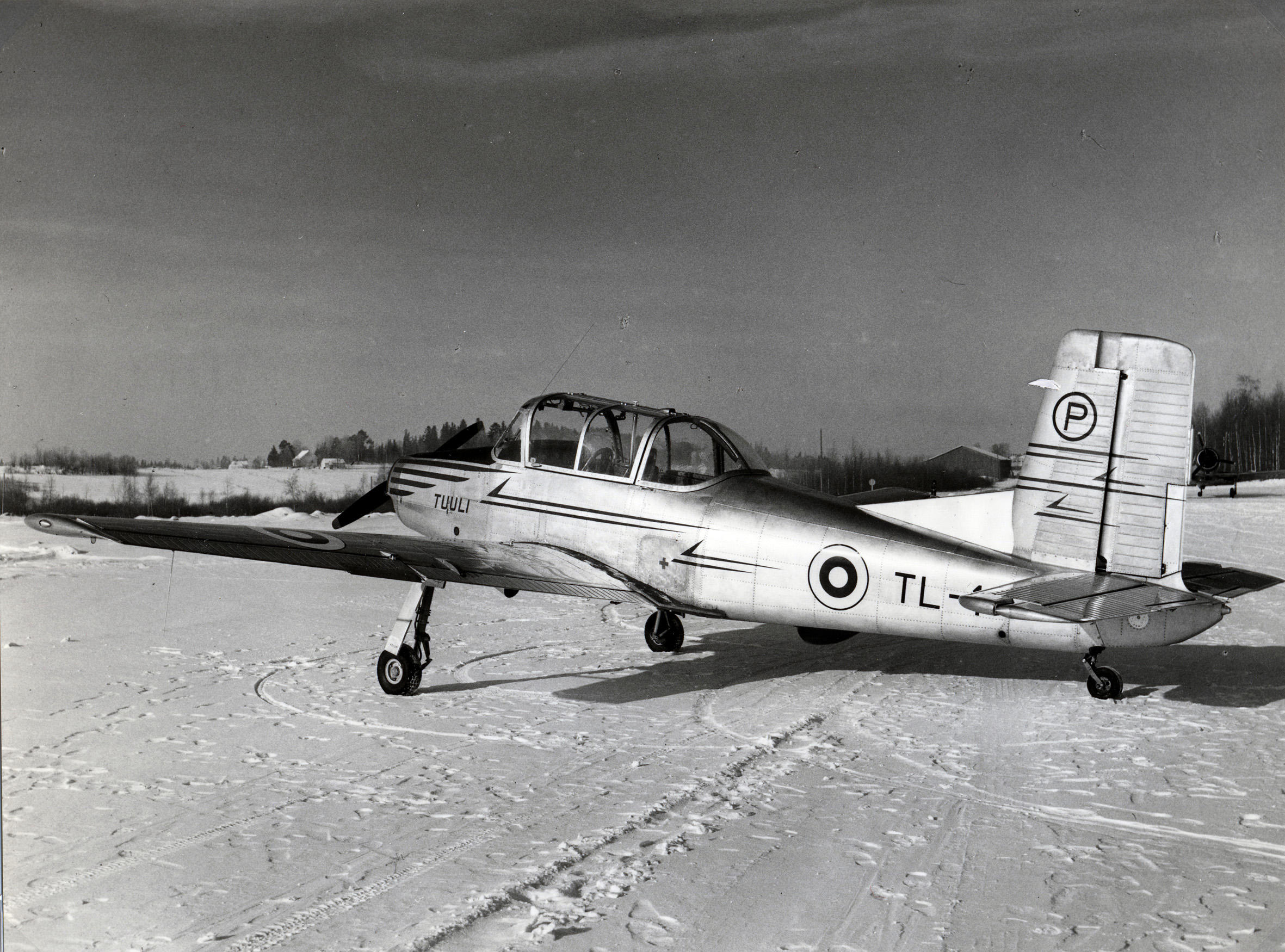
- Tuuli III

General information
- Type: Trainer
- Manufacturer: Valmet
- Primary user: Finnish Air Force
- Number built: one each Tuuli II, III

History
- First flight: 26 September 1951

The Valmet Tuuli was a trainer aircraft, developed for the Finnish Air Force by the State Aircraft Factory (Valtion lentokonetehdas, VL). The aircraft was to be produced in 3 different versions. The last version, Tuuli III was redesigned from scratch, and is basically an entirely different aircraft.

== History ==
The design work on the aircraft was initiated in February 1941 under the leadership of the chief engineer Martti Vainio. The aircraft was a low-winged, tandem-seated trainer aircraft. The Finnish Air Force ordered a prototype, Tuuli I, in August 1942. The design work and its construction was ended in the spring of 1944, when the aircraft manufacturer was forced to put all its efforts in repairing the front-line aircraft. The Aircraft Factory built only stress testing models of the Tuuli I's wings and fuselage.

VL became part of the company Valtion metallitehtaat (Valmet) in 1945 and therefore, the Tuuli II's prototype became Valmet's first aircraft. Valmet wanted to transform weapons factories, which were currently focused on war-reparations to the Soviet Union, into a productive and profitable industry. Artillery factories were transformed into paper machine factories, etc. The leaders of the aircraft factory became professors of the Helsinki Technical University and directors of VTT. At this stage, the design of aircraft in Finland was cooled down and the quality suffered.

In September 1945 the design of the Tuuli II prototype began and was led by Torolf Eklund. The prototype was ready in the autumn of 1948. After this, the development stopped for a couple of years. The Finnish Air Force funded the prototype, and promised an order if it filled their requirements. The requirements had changed, and now the aircraft had to have side-by-side seating. The maiden flight with the Tuuli II was on 26 September 1951. Due to its low wing loading, its turning maneuvers was bad – this was from the military's view a serious deficiency. The aircraft was destroyed on 26 October 1951. The accident happened after the control stick had broken off, due to a forgotten stage of rivetting.

In 1957–1959, a third prototype, the Tuuli III was designed, after the FAF had announced the requirement of a new trainer aircraft. However, the Tuuli III lost the competition to the Swedish Saab 91 Safir, which was much cheaper and was already in production. The Tuuli III was to be the last military aircraft designed in Finland until the Valmet L-70 Vinka in the 1970s.

== Variants ==
- Valmet Tuuli I – Prototype trainer aircraft, only stress testing models built.
- Valmet Tuuli II – Prototype trainer aircraft (1951), one built.
- Valmet Tuuli III – Prototype trainer aircraft (1957–1959), one built.
- Valmet Tuuli IV – Production trainer aircraft, cancelled and not a single aircraft ever built.

== Specifications (Tuuli III) ==
Data from Jane's.

General characteristics

- Crew: 2
- Length: 8 m (26 ft 3 in)
- Wingspan: 11 m (36 ft 1 in)
- Height: 2.8 m (9 ft 2 in)
- Wing area: 17.02 m^{2} (183.2 sq ft)
- Airfoil: root: NACA 64_{3}-418; tip: NACA 64_{2}-415
- Empty weight: 1,080 kg (2,381 lb)
- Gross weight: 1,640 kg (3,616 lb)
- Fuel capacity: 260 L (69 US gal; 57 imp gal) maximum fuel in two wing tanks and a collector tank
- Powerplant: 1 × Continental O-470-A 6-cylinder air-cooled horizontally-opposed piston engine, 168 kW (225 hp)
- Propellers: 2-bladed Hartzell, 2.13 m (7 ft 0 in) diameter constant-speed propeller

Performance

- Maximum speed: 255 km/h (158 mph, 138 kn) at sea level and 1,440 kg (3,175 lb) AUW
- Cruise speed: 215 km/h (134 mph, 116 kn) at sea level and 1,440 kg (3,175 lb) AUW
- Range: 1,125 km (699 mi, 607 nmi)
- Endurance: over 5 hours
- Service ceiling: 5,200 m (17,100 ft)
- Rate of climb: 4.5 m/s (890 ft/min)

== Operators ==
Finland

- Finnish Air Force

== See also ==
Aircraft of comparable role, configuration, and era

- de Havilland Moth Minor
- Fairchild PT-19
- Ikarus Aero 2
- Miles Magister
- Yakovlev UT-2
