= IVL C.24 =

Finnish fighter aircraft

C.24

General information
- Type: Fighter aircraft
- Manufacturer: IVL
- Designer: Kurt Berger
- Primary user: Finnish Air Force
- Number built: 1

History
- First flight: April 16, 1924

IVL C.24 was the first aircraft to be designed in Finland and built in an industrial environment. The aircraft was manufactured by IVL, but only in one example.

The designer of the aircraft was engineer Kurt Berger. The aircraft made its maiden flight on April 16, 1924, piloted by Georg Jäderholm.

The aircraft was a one seated, high-wing monoplane. It was designed as a fighter, but its Siemens-Halske Sh. III engine was under-powered, the speed moderate and the flight characteristics poor. The visibility from the pilot's seat was also very poor. The aircraft was in Finnish Air Force use for a short time.

The aircraft is currently stored in the Finish Air Force Museum, in a restored condition, although possibly eqquiped with the wrong wing.

== Operators ==
Finland

- Finnish Air Force

== Specifications (C.24) ==
Data from AVI

General characteristics

- Crew: 1
- Length: 7.1 m (23 ft 4 in)
- Wingspan: 12.1 m (39 ft 8 in)
- Height: 2.9 m (9 ft 6 in)
- Wing area: 19 m^{2} (200 sq ft)
- Empty weight: 660 kg (1,455 lb)
- Max takeoff weight: 870 kg (1,918 lb)
- Powerplant: × Siemens-Halske Sh. III 11-cylinder counter-rotary engine, 180 kW (240 hp)

Performance

- Maximum speed: 200 km/h (120 mph, 110 kn) +
- Wing loading: 44.7 kg/m^{2} (9.2 lb/sq ft)

== See also ==
Related lists

- List of aircraft of the Finnish Air Force
