= VL Tuisku =

Tuisku
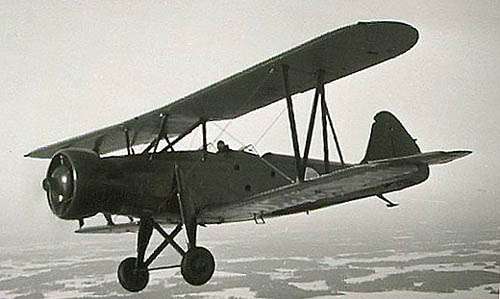

General information
- Type: Advanced trainer or reconnaissance aircraft
- National origin: Finland
- Manufacturer: Valtion Lentokonetehdas
- Designer: A. Ylinen
- Primary user: Finnish Air Force
- Number built: ca. 31

History
- Introduction date: 1935
- First flight: 10 January 1934
- Retired: 1949

The VL Tuisku (English: Blizzard or Snowstorm) was a Finnish trainer aircraft designed in the 1930s. It was a two-seat, single-engined biplane with a welded steel framework, covered with fabric. 30 were produced for the Finnish Air Force and served from 1935 to 1949.

== Design and development ==
Arvo Ylinen, who was the chief designer at the State Aircraft Factory (Valtion lentokonetehdas, abbreviated VL) led a project to create a new trainer aircraft for the Finnish Air Force. A prototype was built in 1933 and it was first flown on January 10, 1934 by lieutenant U.E. Mäkelä. Series production began one year later in 1935 - 30 aircraft were built over a period of two years.

== Operational history ==
Three different versions of the aircraft were made: a maritime, a pilot training and a reconnaissance training version. Examples were attached to all Finnish Air Force squadrons until 1949, with the identification codes TU-149 to TU-179.

The FAF ordered 12 planes in February 1935, eight with wheels and four with floats. Secondary school graduates also bought one Tuisku for the FAF, and all 13 were completed by September 1936. 16 more were ordered in February 1936: 12 with wheels and four with floats. All Tuiskus were given wheels from November 1939 onwards. They were used by the Lentosotakoulu (Training Air Wing) as trainers and by replenishment squadrons in other roles. Five Tuiskus were retired after the Second World War, while 16 continued to serve as liaison aircraft, but by 1948 only two flyable examples were left. The final official flight was officially made in late January 1950, but later there were some unofficial flights. The aircraft were removed from the FAF inventory in December 1952.

11 Tuiskus were destroyed in accidents, resulting in 8 deaths.

== Aircraft on display ==
One Tuisku, named "Sokeri-Sirkku" (TU-178) is preserved and on display at the air museum in Vantaa. The fuselage of TU-169 is preserved in the museum's storage facilities. A Tuisku is also on display in front of the old State Aircraft Factory in Tampere.

== Variants ==
Tuisku
Prototype.
Tuisku I
Initial production version.
Tuisku II
Improved version, fitted with a 215-hp (160-kW) Armstrong Siddeley Lynx radial piston engine.
Tuisku/T
The crew training version fitted with armament, including a manually aimed machine gun on a Scarff ring in the rear cockpit.
Tuisku/O
The pilot training fitted with dual controls in front and rear cockpits.

== Operators ==
Finland
Finnish Air Force

== Specifications (Landplane) ==
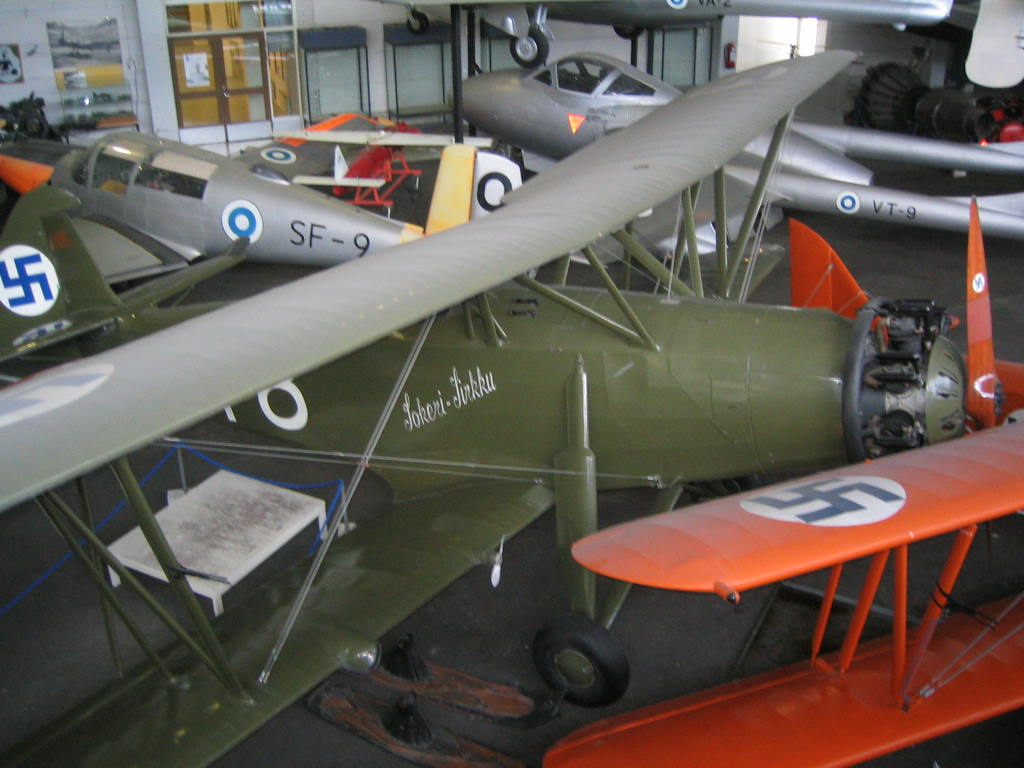
VL Tuisku at the air museum at the Helsinki-Vantaa airfield.

Data from

General characteristics

- Crew: 2
- Length: 9.35 m (30 ft 8 in)
- Upper wingspan: 12.10 m (39 ft 8 in)
- Lower wingspan: 10.28 m (33 ft 9 in)
- Height: 3.26 m (10 ft 8 in)
- Wing area: 33.65 m^{2} (362.2 sq ft)
- Empty weight: 990 kg (2,183 lb)
- Max takeoff weight: 1,625 kg (3,583 lb)
- Fuel capacity: 225 L (49.49 imp gal; 59.44 US gal)
- Powerplant: 1 × Armstrong Siddeley Lynx IVC 7-cylinder air-cooled radial piston engine, 160 kW (215 hp)

Performance

- Maximum speed: 207 km/h (129 mph, 112 kn)
- Cruise speed: 170 km/h (110 mph, 92 kn)
- Landing speed: 79 km/h (49.1 mph; 42.7 kn)
- Range: 1,150 km (710 mi, 620 nmi)
- Endurance: 7 hours
- Service ceiling: 4,400 m (14,400 ft) service
- Rate of climb: 2.80 m/s (551 ft/min)
- Time to altitude: 11 minutes 55 seconds to 2,000 m (6,561.7 ft) at 1,350 kg (2,976 lb).

35 minutes 50 seconds to 2,000 m (6,561.7 ft) at 1,350 kg (2,976 lb).

- Wing loading: 48.3 kg/m^{2} (9.9 lb/sq ft)
- Power/mass: 0.0987 kW/kg (0.06 hp/lb)

Armament

- Guns: (Tuisku/T crew trainer) 1x fixed forward firing in the forward fuselage synchronised to fire through the propeller plus 1x similar weapon manually aimed and mounted on a Scarff ring in the rear cockpit

== See also ==
Related lists

- List of interwar military aircraft
