= VL Paarma =

Paarma
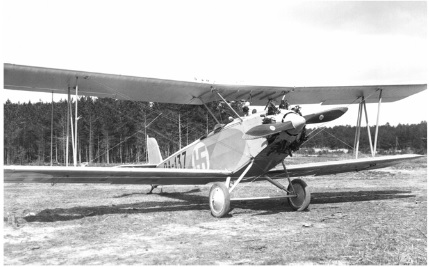

General information
- Type: Trainer
- National origin: Finland
- Manufacturer: Valtion Lentokonetehdas (VL)
- Status: Cancelled
- Primary user: Finnish Air Force
- Number built: 1

History
- First flight: 20 March 1931

VL Paarma (English: Gadfly) was a Finnish biplane, two-seat trainer aircraft, designed by the State Aircraft Factory (Valtion Lentokonetehdas) for use with the Finnish Air Force.

== Design and development ==
A prototype was constructed in 1930–31 and made its maiden flight on 20 March 1931. The aircraft was, however, under-powered, and the flight characteristics were poor. Suggestions for improvements were made and the engine was replaced by a higher-powered one. The aircraft was damaged in 1933, but was never repaired.

== Specifications (Paarma) ==
Data from Albatrosista Pilatukseen. Tikkakoski: Keski-Suomen ilmailumuseo

General characteristics

- Crew: 2
- Length: 7.9 m (25 ft 11 in)
- Wingspan: 10.5 m (34 ft 5 in)
- Height: 2.8 m (9 ft 2 in)
- Max takeoff weight: 960 kg (2,116 lb)
- Powerplant: 1 × Siemens-Halske Sh 12 9-cylinder, air-cooled, radial engine, 89 kW (120 hp)
- Propellers: 2-bladed wooden fixed-pitch propeller

Performance

- Maximum speed: 135 km/h (84 mph, 73 kn)
- Service ceiling: 3,000 m (9,800 ft)
