= NVI F.K.31 =

F.K.31
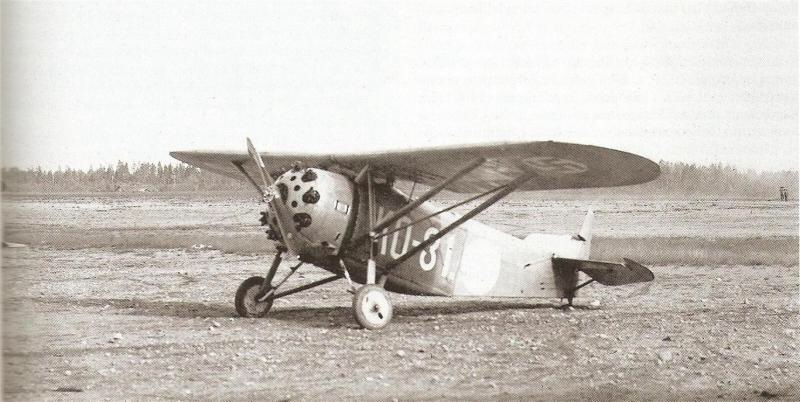

General information
- Type: Reconnaissance-fighter
- Manufacturer: Nationale Vliegtuig Industrie
- Primary user: Finnish Air Force
- Number built: 17

History
- Introduction date: 1925
- First flight: June 1923
- Retired: 1927

NVI F.K.31 was a Dutch designed parasol wing two seat reconnaissance-fighter, which was developed in the 1920s by Frederick Koolhoven. The aircraft saw some service in the Finnish Air Force.

== History ==
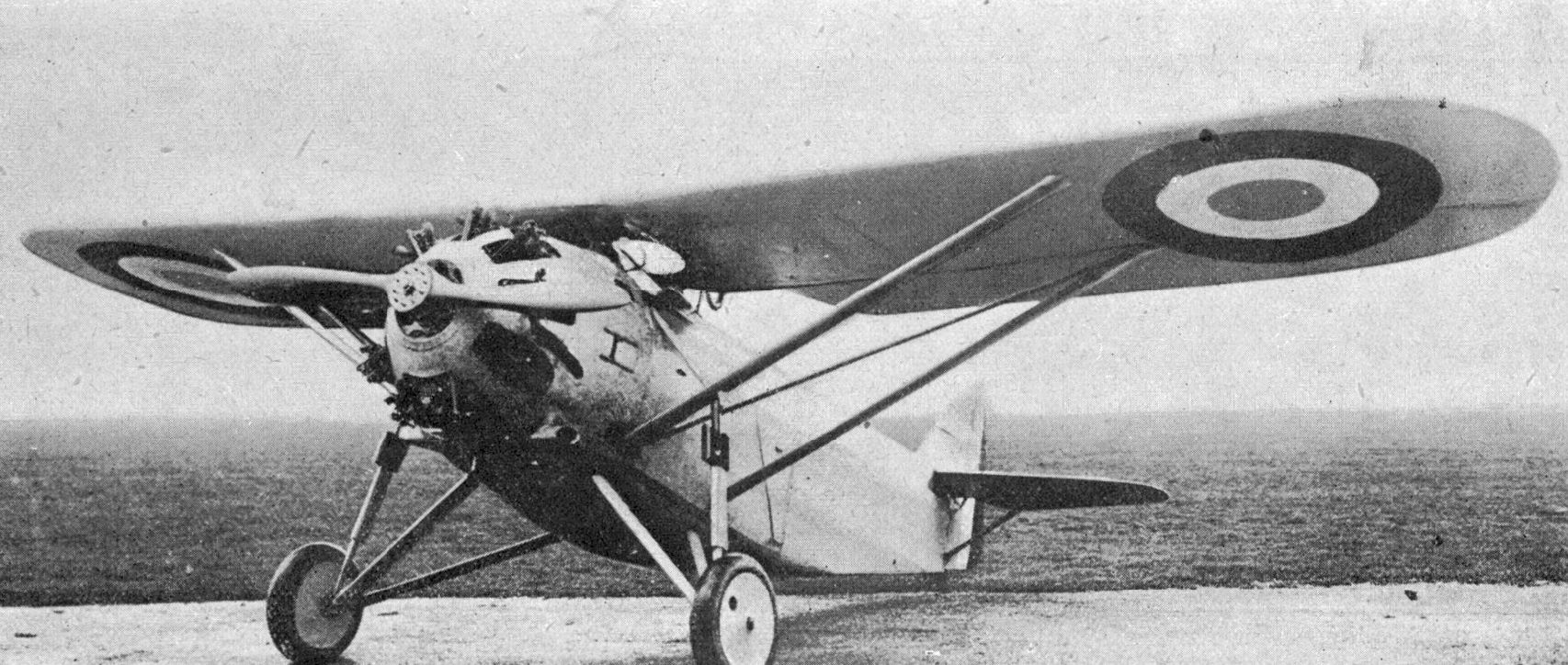
De Monge M.101 C2 photo from L'Aéronautique January,1926

The F.K.31 became Koolhoven's first design for the N.V. Nationale Vliegtuig Industrie ("National Aircraft Industry") a two-seat scout and fighter. Its prototype became the sensation of the Paris Air Salon of 1922. However, the production of the F.K.31 met with many difficulties, forcing the N.V. Nationale Vliegtuig Industrie to close down.

Further development was carried out in France, resulting in the De Monge M.101 C2, but only a single example was built, powered by a Gnome & Rhône 9Ac radial engine.

== Use in Finland ==
The Finnish Air Force used twelve F.K.31s between 1926 and 1932. The aircraft had been purchased while the development still was being carried out. The Finnish pilots disliked the aircraft and the Finnish Air Force F.K.31s flew for fewer than 6 hours each.

The Koolhoven F.K.31 was called Kolho ("Clumsy") or Kolhovene ("Clumsy Boat") in the Finnish Air Force.

== Operators ==
Finland

- Finnish Air Force

Netherlands

- LA-KNIL

== Specifications ==
Data from Green & Swanborough (1997) p.461

General characteristics

- Crew: Two
- Length: 7.8 m (25 ft 7 in)
- Wingspan: 13.7 m (44 ft 11 in)
- Height: 3.4 m (11 ft 2 in)
- Wing area: 27.2 m^{2} (293 sq ft)
- Empty weight: 1,040 kg (2,293 lb)
- Gross weight: 1,800 kg (3,968 lb)
- Powerplant: 1 × Bristol Jupiter IV nine-cylinder radial, 310 kW (420 hp)
- Propellers: 2-bladed

Performance

- Maximum speed: 255 km/h (158 mph, 138 kn) at 4,000 m (13,000 ft)
- Endurance: 6 hr

Armament

- Guns: One or two fixed forward firing machine guns, one more on mounting in rear cockpit
