= IVL Haukka =

1920s Finnish fighter aircraft

Haukka
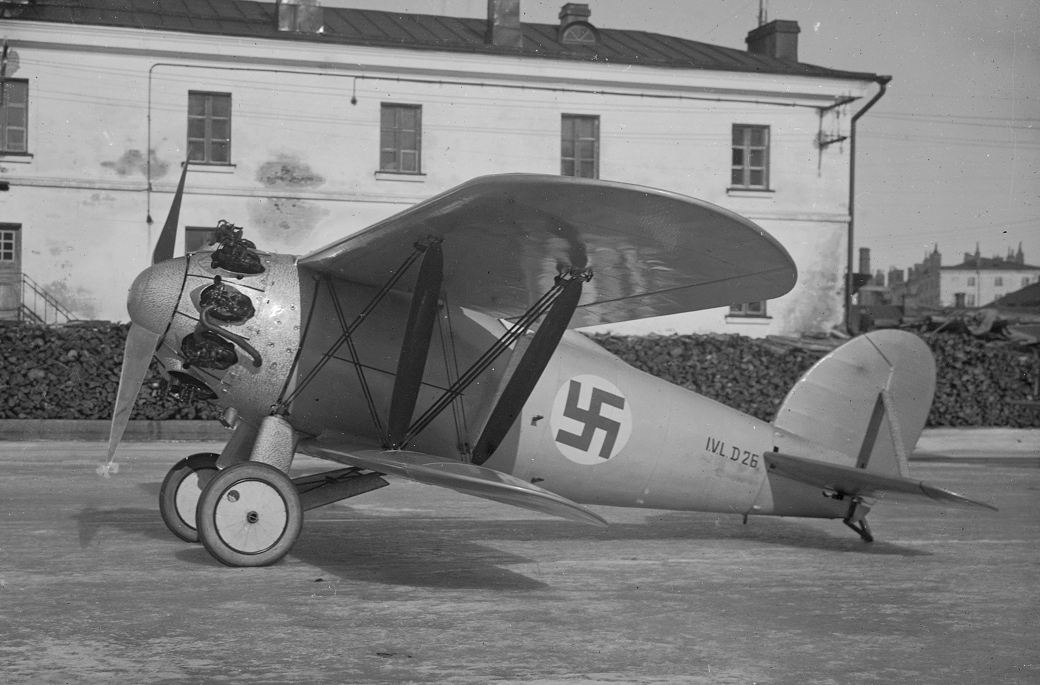

General information
- Type: Fighter aircraft
- Manufacturer: Ilmailuvoimien Lentokonetehdas
- Primary user: Finnish Air Force
- Number built: Haukka I: 1 Haukka II: 2

History
- First flight: I: 17 March 1927

IVL Haukka were a series of Finnish biplane fighters designed by Kurt Berger at IVL in 1927. "Haukka" is Finnish for "Hawk".

== Versions ==
- IVL D.26 Haukka I - the first prototype aircraft, which made its maiden flight on March 17, 1927. Only one aircraft was manufactured.
- VL D.27 Haukka II - a further developed version of the D.26. Two aircraft were manufactured at the aircraft factory at Suomenlinna (which now had shortened its name from IVL to VL). These aircraft were used by the Finnish Air Force in its Maalentoeskaadri for a couple of years. During this time the FAF had begun the purchasing of foreign fighters, which eventually halted the series production of the Haukka II.

== Surviving aircraft ==
Two Haukkas are preserved, one D.26 at Päijät-Häme Aviation museum, and one D.27 at Hallinportti Aviation Museum.

== Operators ==
Finland

- Finnish Air Force

== Specifications (D.26) ==
Data from Jane's all the World's Aircraft 1928, The Complete Book of Fighters

General characteristics

- Crew: 1
- Length: 6.6 m (21 ft 8 in)
- Wingspan: 9.6 m (31 ft 6 in)
- Height: 2.8 m (9 ft 2 in)
- Wing area: 24 m^{2} (260 sq ft)
- Empty weight: 940 kg (2,072 lb)
- Gross weight: 1,290 kg (2,844 lb)
- Powerplant: 1 × Gnome et Rhône 9Ac Jupiter 9-cylinder air-cooled radial piston engine, 309 kW (414 hp)
- Propellers: 2-bladed fixed pitch propeller

Performance

- Maximum speed: 249 km/h (155 mph, 134 kn)
- Service ceiling: 7,900 m (25,900 ft)

== See also ==
Related lists

- List of aircraft of the Finnish Air Force
