= VL Kotka =

Finnish maritime patrol aircraft

Kotka "Eagle"
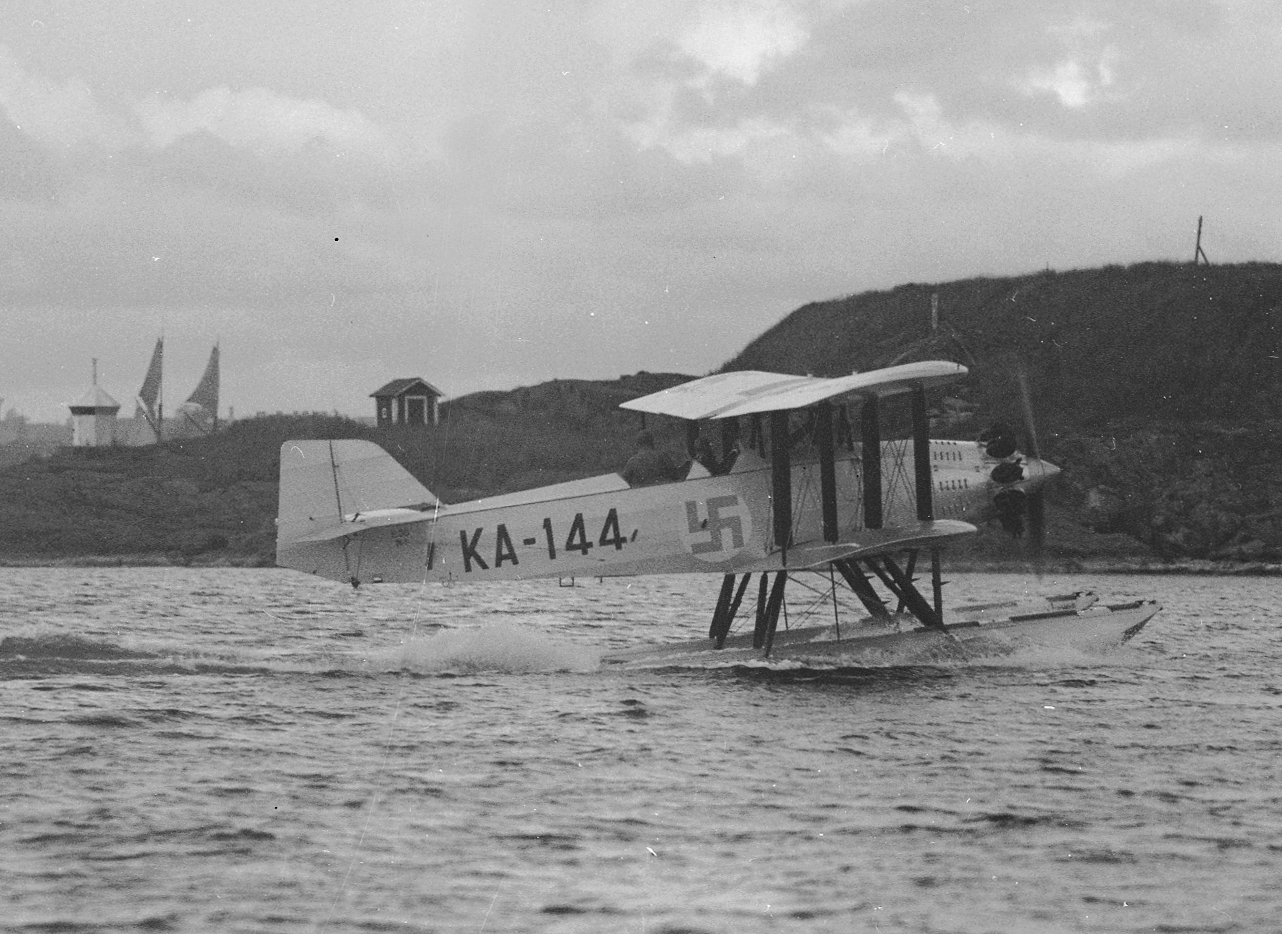
- VL Kotka serial KA-144 in Suomenlinna, circa October 1930

General information
- Type: two-seater patrol biplane
- Manufacturer: Valtion lentokonetehdas
- Primary user: Finnish Air Force
- Number built: 5 (plus 3 prototypes)

History
- Manufactured: 1931-19??
- Introduction date: 1931
- First flight: 30 September 1930
- Retired: 1944

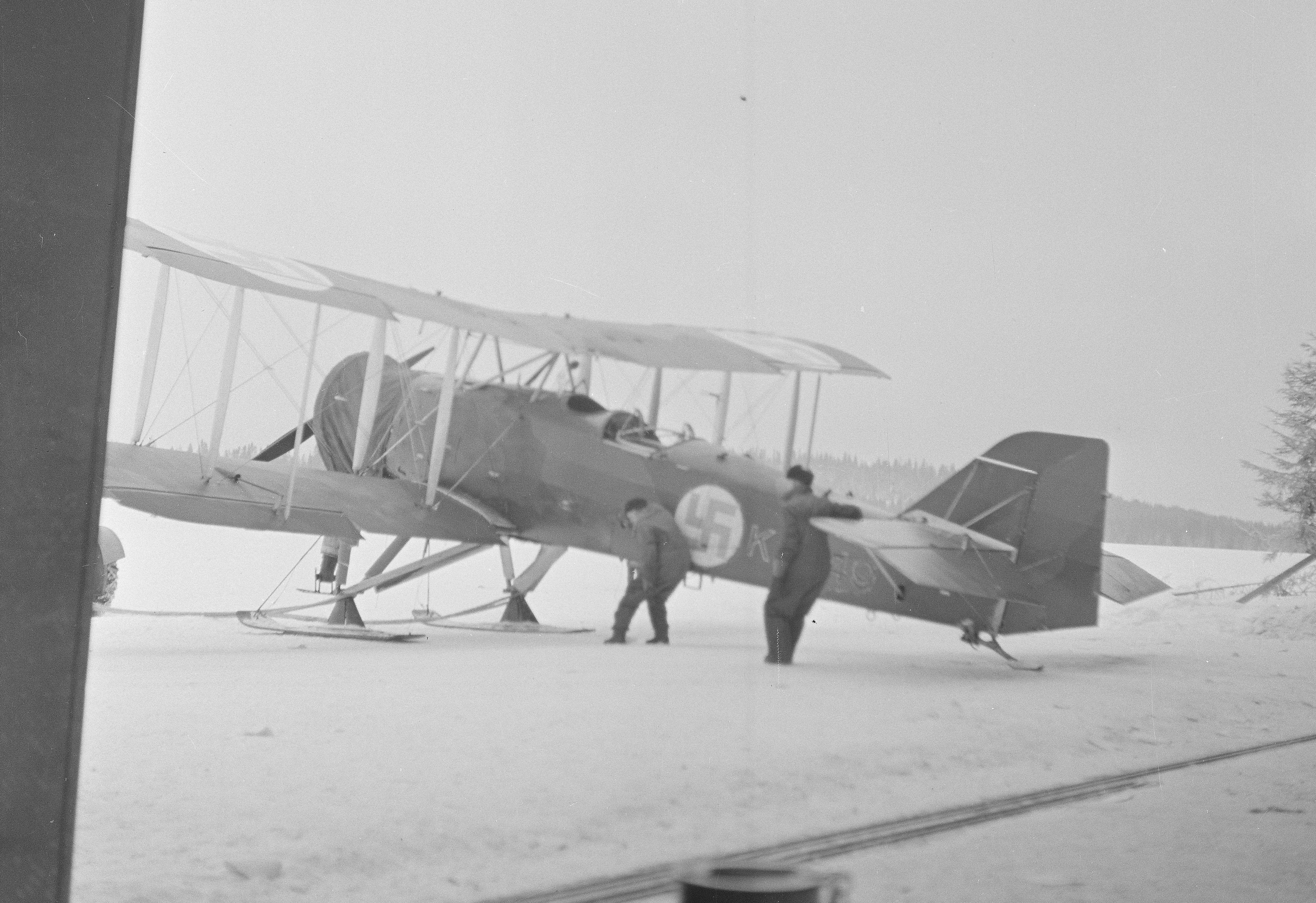
VL Kotka on Tikkakoski airport in March 1940.

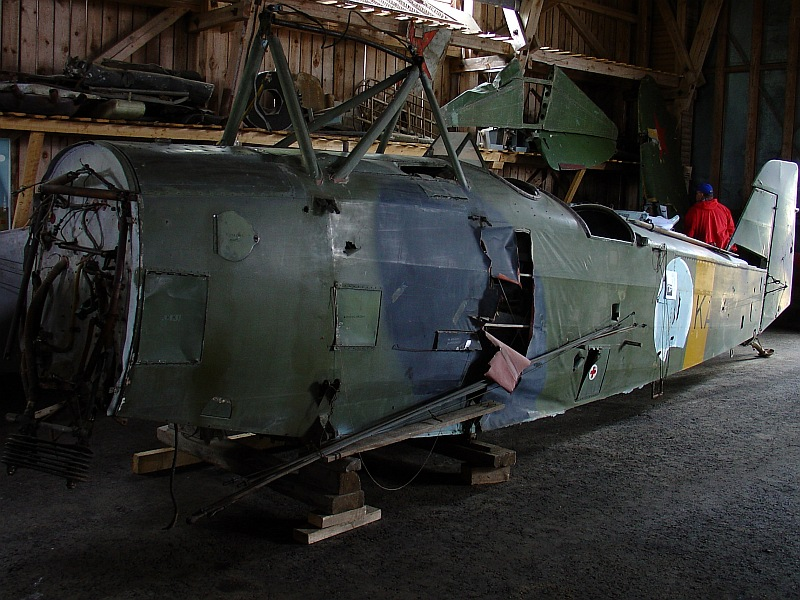
VL E.30 Kotka, KA-147, in Vesivehma in 2006

VL Kotka ("Eagle") was a Finnish two-seat, biplane maritime patrol aircraft, designed and built by the Valtion lentokonetehdas or VL ("State Aircraft Factory"). It was meant as a cheaper replacement (compared to the Blackburn Ripon) for the outdated IVL A.22 Hansas that were in service with the Finnish Air Force.

The prototype made its first flight on September 30, 1930. In 1931, the State Aircraft Factory began production of a series of five aircraft. These were used as liaison aircraft until 1944.

One aircraft (KA-147) is on display at the Päijät-Häme Aviation Museum.

== Versions ==
- VL E.30 Kotka prototype KA-144 - this machine was built by the Finnish Government Aircraft Works, and was a prototype fitted with floats and a Bristol "Jupiter IV" engine.
- VL E.30 Kotka I KA-145, 147 & 148 - three of the production aircraft (KA-145 – KA-148) fitted with regular landing gear (and could equip skis) and Wright R-1820-E Cyclone radial engines, 429 kW (575 hp).
- VL E.30 Kotka I KA-146 - this machine was a Kotka I fitted with the same or very similar floats to the ones the KA-144 Kotka prototype had.
- VL E.31 Kotka II KA-149 - the last, more modified series production aircraft fitted with a Pratt & Whitney R-1690-B Hornet engine, (575 hp).
- VL E.32 Kotka III - cancelled third series due to the type being outdated.

== Operators ==
Finland

- Finnish Air Force.

== Specifications (KA-147, land aircraft) ==
Data from

General characteristics

- Length: 10.25 m (33 ft 8 in)
- Wingspan: 12.7 m (41 ft 8 in)
- Height: 3.8 m (12 ft 6 in)
- Wing area: 50 m^{2} (540 sq ft)
- Empty weight: 1,380 kg (3,042 lb)
- Gross weight: 2,380 kg (5,247 lb)
- Powerplant: 1 × Wright R-1820-E Cyclone 9-cylinder air-cooled radial piston engine, 429 kW (575 hp)
- Propellers: 2-bladed Hamilton Standard DWG No 35 B2-2

Performance

- Maximum speed: 225 km/h (140 mph, 121 kn)
- Range: 650 km (400 mi, 350 nmi)
- Service ceiling: 5,600 m (18,400 ft)

Armament

- Guns:

- 7.7 mm Vickers machine gun on left side of the fuselage (500 rounds)
- 2 × 7.7 mm Lewis machine guns in the observer's cockpit (8 × 97 rounds)

- Bombs:

- 3 × 100 kg or 6 × 50 kg bombs under the fuselage

== See also ==
- Valtion lentokonetehdas

Aircraft of comparable role, configuration, and era

- Blackburn Ripon
