= Piaggio P.150 =

1952 Italian trainer aircraft

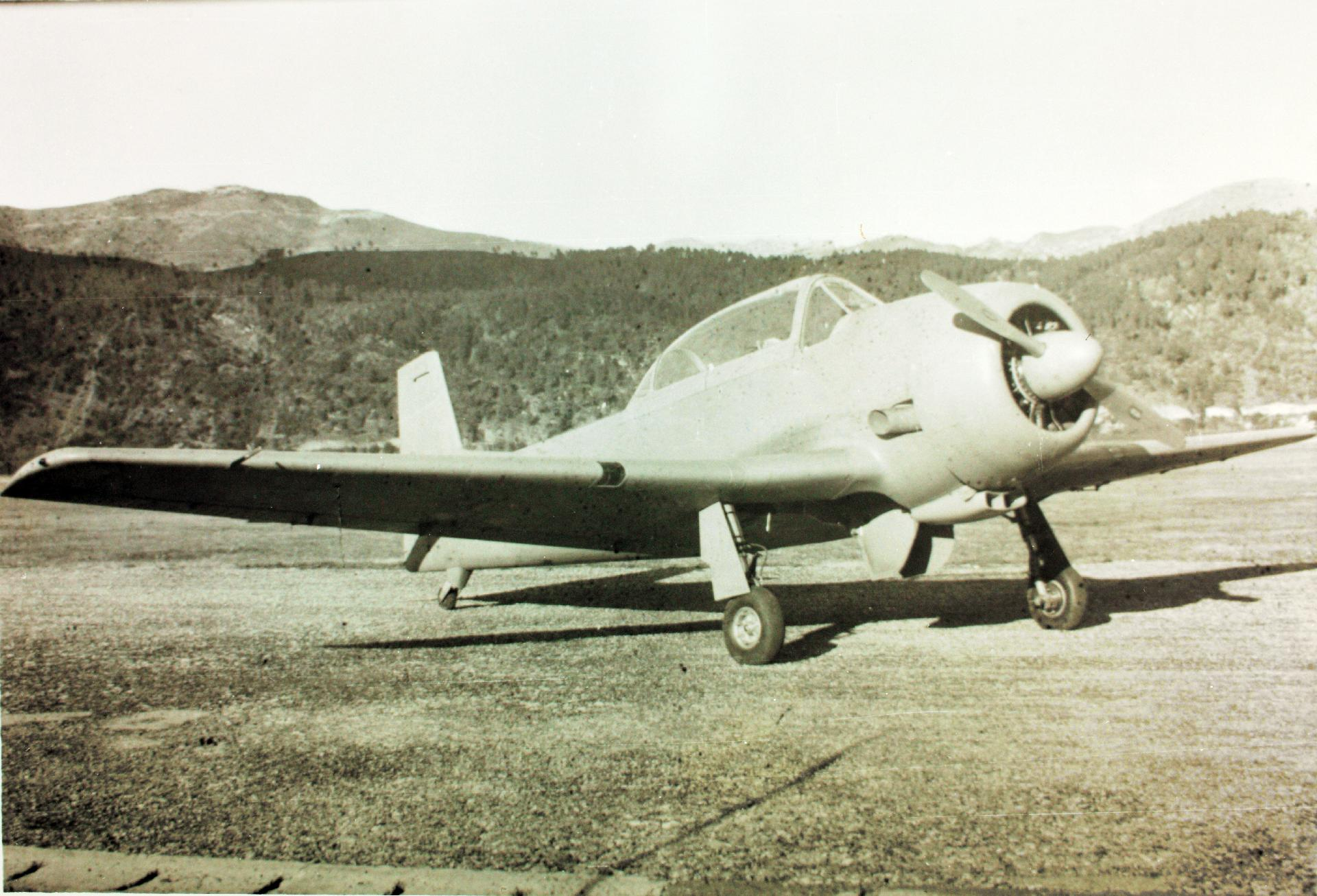

General information
- Type: Training monoplane
- Manufacturer: Piaggio Aero
- Primary user: Italian Air Force
- Number built: 1

History
- First flight: 1952
- Retired: 1954

The Piaggio P.150 was a 1950s Italian two-seat trainer designed and built by Piaggio to meet an Italian Air Force requirement to replace the North American T-6.

== Development ==
The P.150 was designed and built to compete as an Italian Air Force T-6 replacement against the Fiat G.49 and Macchi MB.323. The P.150 was an all-metal low-wing cantilever monoplane with a wide-track retractable tailwheel landing gear. The pilot and instructor were seated in tandem under one glazed canopy. It was originally powered by a Pratt & Whitney Wasp radial engine and later an Alvis Leonides engine. The aircraft was not chosen and did not go into production.

== Operators ==
Italy

- Italian Air Force operated only one aircraft for test evaluation from 1952 until 1954

== Specifications (P.150) ==
Data from Jane's All The World's Aircraft 1953-54

General characteristics

- Crew: 2
- Length: 9.25 m (30 ft 4 in)
- Wingspan: 12.90 m (42 ft 4 in)
- Height: 2.80 m (9 ft 2 in)
- Wing area: 25.20 m^{2} (271.3 sq ft)
- Aspect ratio: 6.6:1
- Empty weight: 1,940 kg (4,277 lb)
- Gross weight: 2,540 kg (5,600 lb)
- Fuel capacity: 620 L (160 US gal; 140 imp gal)
- Powerplant: 1 × Pratt & Whitney R-1340-S3H1 Wasp nine-cylinder radial engine, 450 kW (600 hp) (takeoff power)

Performance

- Maximum speed: 350 km/h (220 mph, 190 kn) at 1,800 m (6,000 ft)
- Cruise speed: 315 km/h (196 mph, 170 kn) at 2,000 m (6,600 ft)
- Stall speed: 103 km/h (64 mph, 56 kn) at sea level
- Range: 1,400 km (870 mi, 760 nmi)
- Endurance: 4 hr 30 min
- Service ceiling: 7,300 m (24,000 ft)
- Time to altitude: 4 min 30 s to 2,000 m (6,600 ft)

Armament

- Guns: 1× machine gun in port wing

== See also ==
Aircraft of comparable role, configuration, and era

- CAC Winjeel
- I.Ae. 22 DL
- Percival Provost
- Valmet Vihuri
- Yakovlev Yak-11
