= 1952 in aviation =

This is a list of aviation-related events from 1952:

== Events ==
- The Royal Navy conducts the world's first trials of an angled flight deck, aboard the aircraft carrier HMS Triumph. It had been invented by Royal Navy Captain (later Rear Admiral) Dennis R. F. Campbell.
- The Royal Navy conducts the world's first trials of a mirror landing aid, aboard the aircraft carrier HMS Illustrious. It had been invented by Royal Navy Lieutenant Commander (later Rear Admiral) H. C. Nicholas "Nick" Goodhart.

=== January ===
- United Nations forces in Korea begin Operation Moonlight Sonata, which uses the illumination effect of the moon on snow to allow night-flying aircraft to find enemy trains operating at night and isolate them by bombing the tracks in front of and behind them, with carrier-based naval aircraft destroying the isolated trains the following morning. Several trains are destroyed in this way by the spring of 1952.
- The Royal Navy's Fleet Air Arm makes use of a helicopter in a major rescue effort for the first time when a Westland Dragonfly attempts to rescue two men from the sinking cargo ship SS Flying Enterprise. Although the attempt is unsuccessful, the Dragonfly proves capable of flying in conditions previously thought to preclude helicopter operations.
- The United States Navy begins Operation Package, an effort to use carrier air power to interdict enemy road and rail traffic in northeastern Korea, in conjunction with Operation Derail, a shore bombardment campaign against coastal roads and railroads by surface warships. The two operations will end in February and be only partially successful.
- The Supreme Allied Commander in Europe (SACEUR) has 200 atomic bombs allocated for his use in the defense of Europe in the event of a Soviet offensive against the North Atlantic Treaty Organization (NATO).
- January 1 – Mail subsidies to National Airlines end, and the United States Post Office Department places the airline on a mail service rate that makes it self-sustaining throughout its system.
- January 5 – Pan American World Airways commences transatlantic freight services.
- January 10 – An Aer Lingus Douglas Dakota 3 (registration EI-AFL) on a Northolt Aerodrome–Dublin flight crashes in Wales due to vertical draft in the mountains of Snowdonia, killing all 23 people on board. It is the airline's first fatal crash in its fifteen-year history.
- January 19 – Northwest Orient Airlines Flight 324 – a Douglas C-54E Skymaster on a charter flight from Elmendorf Air Force Base in Anchorage, Territory of Alaska, to McChord Air Force Base in Tacoma, Washington – diverts to Sandspit Airport in Sandspit, British Columbia, after feathering its No. 1 propeller due to a broken oil cooler. The C-54 touches down at Sandspit but then attempts a go-around. It stalls during the attempted climb-out and ditches in water beyond the end of the runway. All or nearly all of the 43 people aboard the plane evacuate without serious injury, but 36 of them die of drowning or exposure in the near-freezing air and water temperatures they encounter outside the plane.
- January 22
  - The de Havilland Comet 1 becomes the first turbojet-powered civil airliner to be awarded a certificate of airworthiness.
  - American Airlines Flight 6780, a Convair CV-240, crashes into a house in Elizabeth, New Jersey, while on final approach to Newark Airport, killing all 23 people on the plane and seven people on the ground. It is the first fatal accident involving a Convair CV-240. Among the dead are Robert P. Patterson, a jurist and former Undersecretary of War under President Franklin Delano Roosevelt and former Secretary of War under President Harry S Truman; former war correspondent John F. Chester; and U.S. Civil Aeronautics Administration officials George T. Williams and John D. Rice, both engaged in the development of airport radar systems and navigational aids at the time.

=== February ===
- Operation Strangle, a day-and-night air interdiction campaign against enemy roads, bridges, and tunnels across the width of the Korean Peninsula between 38 degrees 15 minutes North and 39 degrees 15 minutes North, by the United States Air Force, Navy, and Marine Corps which had begun in June 1951, ends without success. The similar Operation Saturate begins, but also ultimately will be unsuccessful.
- February 1 – The first civilian passenger terminal opens at Rio de Janeiro–Galeão International Airport in Rio de Janeiro, Brazil. Previously, civilian passengers had used the Brazilian Air Force facilities at adjoining Galeão Air Force Base.
- February 4 – A Sabena Douglas C-47A Skytrain suffers a propeller failure in flight over the Belgian Congo. Debris from the propeller failure cuts some of the aircraft's control cables, causing the crew to lose control. The plane crashes near Kikwit, killing all 16 people on board.
- February 10 – Major George A. Davis Jr. is awarded the Medal of Honor posthumously, after attacking a group of 12 Mikoyan-Gurevich MiG-15s that were about to bounce other U.S. aircraft. He shot down two before being shot down himself. He had been a World War II flying ace and was Korean War ace of aces.
- February 11 – Just after National Airlines Flight 101, a Douglas DC-6 (registration N90891), takes off from Newark International Airport in New Jersey, its No. 3 propeller reverses. Misunderstanding the problem, the crew feathers the No. 4 propeller and attempts to return to the airport, but the aircraft crashes in Elizabeth, New Jersey, narrowly missing an orphanage and killing 29 of the 63 people on board and four people on the ground. It is the third in a string of airliner accidents at Newark International since December 1951 and prompts the Port Authority of New York and New Jersey to close the airport until November 15.
- February 17 – Flying over Sicily, a Hunting Air Transport Vickers Model 614 Viking 1 (registration G-AHPI) strays off course and crashes into Monte la Cinta, killing all 31 people on board. It is the second-deadliest aviation accident in Italy's history at the time.
- February 18 – The Brazilian airline Paraense Transportes Aéreos is founded. It will begin flight operations in March.
- February 19 – During a night insertion mission over South Korea, a North Korean double agent detonates a grenade aboard a U.S. Air Force Curtiss C-46D Commando (registration 44–78038). The C-46D crashes, killing all 10 people on board.
- February 26 – Prime Minister Winston Churchill announces that the United Kingdom has developed its own atomic bomb.

=== March ===
- March 3 – An Air France SNCASE SE.161/P7 Languedoc (registration F-BCUM) turns onto its back and crashes during its initial climbout from Nice-le Var Airport in Nice, France, killing all 38 people on board.
- March 22
  - Temporarily blinded when enemy antiaircraft fire hits his USS Valley Forge (CV-45)-based AD Skyraider during a bombing raid against rail and truck lines in North Korea, U.S. Navy Ensign Kenneth Schechter rejects the suggestion of fellow Valley Forge Skyraider pilot and best friend Lieutenant, junior grade, Howard Thayer that he bail out over the ocean, where Navy forces can rescue him from the water. Instead, Thayer, flying only feet away from Schechter's aircraft, coaches Schechter to a safe, blind landing at a United States Army dirt airstrip in Korea. Schechter loses his right eye but recovers the sight in his left eye; he receives the Distinguished Flying Cross in 1995 for his 1952 flight. Thayer dies in a crash in 1961, but receives a posthumous Distinguished Flying Cross in 2009 for assisting Schechter.
  - The KLM Royal Dutch Airlines Douglas DC-6 Koningin Juliana (registration PH-TPJ) crashes into a forest on approach to Frankfurt International Airport in Frankfurt-am-Main, West Germany, killing 45 of the 47 people on board. At the time, it is the deadliest aviation accident in the history of Germany.
- March 23 – Four hijackers commandeer a CSA Czech Airlines Douglas C-47 Skytrain making a domestic flight in Czechoslovakia from Prague to Brno and force it to land at Frankfurt-am-Main, West Germany.
- March 24 – A Société Africaine des Transports Tropicaux (SATT) Lockheed 18-07-01 Lodestar crashes just after takeoff from Gao Airport in Gao, Mali, killing 17 of the 21 people on board. It is the deadliest aviation accident in the history of Mali at the time.
- March 26 – An Aeroflot airliner landing at Tula Airport in Tula in the Soviet Union slides off the runway and collides with a Soviet Air Force transport aircraft carrying 34 military academy students that is preparing for takeoff, killing a total of 70 people. It is the second-deadliest aviation accident in the history of the Soviet Union or Russia at the time.
- March 29 – A TACA de Venezuela Douglas DC-3 (registration YV-C-AZU) crashes into Cerro Grande, a mountain east of San Felipe, Venezuela, killing all 12 people on board.
- March 30
  - A Philippine Air Lines Douglas C-47A Skytrain (registration PI-C270) crashes on takeoff from Loakan Airport in Baguio in the Philippines, killing 10 of the 29 people on board.
  - The Brazilian airline Paraense Transportes Aéreos makes its first flight, using a Consolidated PBY-5A Catalina.

=== April ===
- The U.S. Joint Chiefs of Staff decide that if the Korean War broadens to include war with the Soviet Union in East Asia, the United States will conduct an atomic and conventional air offensive in the region but will fall back into a defensive posture there if the war spreads to Europe.
- April 9 – The Martin 2-0-2 Mokusei-go (registration N93043), leased from Northwest Orient Airlines and operating as Japan Air Lines Flight 301, crashes into Mount Mihara on Izu Ōshima in Japan at an altitude of 2,000 feet (610 m), killing all 37 people on board. It is the second-deadliest aviation accident in Japanese history at the time.
- April 11 – The Pan American World Airways Douglas DC-4 Clipper Endeavor, operating as Flight 526A, suffers the failure of two engines and ditches in rough seas in the Atlantic Ocean 11.3 miles northwest of San Juan, Puerto Rico, nine minutes after takeoff from San Juan-Isla Grande Airport. The plane breaks up and sinks in three minutes, with many panicking passengers refusing to leave the sinking aircraft; 52 of the 69 people on board die, and the United States Coast Guard rescues the 17 survivors. After this accident the implementation of pre-flight safety demonstrations for over-water flights is recommended. The aircraft's wreckage will be discovered in July 2026 on the bottom of the Atlantic Ocean at a depth of 2,000 feet (610 m).
- April 18
  - Six hijackers armed with a kitchen knife, a pistol that will not fire, and a revolver for which they had no ammunition take control of a JAT airliner making a domestic flight in the Socialist Federal Republic of Yugoslavia from Beograd to Ljubljana and force it to land at Graz, Austria.
  - Robin Airlines (doing business as North Continent Airlines) Flight 416W – a Curtiss C-46F Commando (registration N8404C) on approach to Lockheed Air Terminal in Los Angeles County, California – descends below the 3,000-foot (910-meter) altitude directed by air traffic controllers and crashes into a hill at an altitude of 980 feet (300 meters), killing all 29 people on board.
- April 25
  - The post-World War II prohibition of the production of arms and aircraft in Japan is lifted.
  - John Jay Hopkins founds General Dynamics Corporation.
- April 28 – The Pan American World Airways Boeing 377 Stratocruiser 10–26 Clipper Good Hope, operating as Flight 202, crashes in the Amazon Basin 410 km (220 nautical miles) southwest of Carolina, Brazil, killing all 50 people on board.

=== May ===
- The first of 40 United States Air Force B-45 Tornado bombers modified to carry nuclear weapons arrive in the United Kingdom to serve as a nuclear deterrent to the Soviet Union. The last of them will arrive in the United Kingdom in June.
- May 1 – The International Air Transport Association agrees on new "Tourist Class" fares, which are first offered by Pan American World Airways on its "Rainbow Service" between New York City and London
- May 2 – BOAC introduces the de Havilland DH.106 Comet 1 on its multi-stop London, England-Johannesburg, South Africa route, the first regular service flown by a jet airliner. G-ALYP makes the first flight, carrying 36 passengers.
- May 3 – A British Overseas Airways Corporation (BOAC) de Havilland Comet becomes the first jet airliner to arrive in South Africa, landing at Palmietfontein after a 24-hour journey with five refueling stops en route.
- May 5 – A Fred Olsen Flyveselskap Douglas C-47A Skytrain (registration LN-NAD) on a charter flight carrying families from an Antarctic whaling factory ship docked at Rotterdam, the Netherlands, from Schiphol Airport in Amsterdam to Jarlsberg Airport in Jarlsberg, Norway, strays off course and crashes southwest of Skien, Norway, killing 11 of the 29 people on board.
- May 12 – Squadron Leader P. G. Fisher makes a flight from England to Australia in an English Electric Canberra bomber in a record 23 hours 5 minutes of flying time.
- May 15 – The Royal Air Force takes delivery of its last Avro Anson. The Anson had been in production for the RAF since 1934.
- May 26 – At Palm Springs, California, the Stits SA-2A Sky Baby, a homebuilt aircraft constructed to claim the title of world's smallest airplane, makes its first flight.
- May 29 – Aerial refueling is used on a combat mission for the first time, with twelve F-84 Thunderjets of the 159th Fighter-Bomber Squadron being refueled by a KB-29 Superfortress on their way back from an attack on Sariwon, Korea.

=== June ===
- The Israeli Air Force places its first order for jet aircraft, Dassault Ouragans. The first 25 will not be delivered until October 1954.
- June 13 – Soviet Air Force MiG-15 (NATO reporting name "Fagot") fighters shoot down a Swedish Air Force Douglas Tp-79 – the Swedish designation for the Douglas C-47 Skytrain – on an electronic intelligence-gathering mission over the Baltic Sea surveying Soviet military facilities in the Estonian, Latvian, and Lithuanian Soviet Socialist Republics. The Tp-79 crashes into the sea east of Gotska Sandön, killing all eight members of its crew. The Soviet Union will deny shooting it down until 1991.
- June 16 – Over the Baltic Sea west of Hiiumaa, two Soviet Air Force MiG-15s attack two Swedish Air Force Tp-47 – the Swedish designation for the Canso A, which in turn was the Canadian version of the Consolidated PBY-5A Catalina – amphibious flying boats searching for survivors of the Douglas Tp-79 shot down on June 13, pursuing them and firing at them as they flee westward. One Tp-47 escapes, but the other makes an emergency landing on the sea near the West German cargo ship Münsterland with only one engine working. Münsterland rescues all five members of its crew, two of whom are injured, but the TP-47 sinks.
- June 23–27 – United Nations aircraft conduct concentrated attacks on 13 North Korean electric power generation facilities which previously had been off-limits to air attack in the most intense use of airpower of the Korean War. Aircraft of the United States Air Force, United States Navy, United States Marine Corps, and South African Air Force all participate as do all four aircraft carriers – USS Boxer (CV-21), USS Princeton (CV-37), USS Bon Homme Richard (CV-31), and USS Philippine Sea (CV-47) – of Task Force 77, the first time since World War II that four Essex-class aircraft carriers have operated together, with U.S. Navy and Marine Corps aircraft flying 1,200 sorties on June 23–24. In one strike on the Sui-ho Dam, U.S. Navy AD Skyraiders drop 85 short tons (77 metric tons) of bombs in two minutes. The attacks result in extensive and sustained blackouts in North Korea, which is powerless for two weeks, and in bordering areas in Manchuria in the People's Republic of China, some of which last for months.
- June 25 – A Royal Air Force Avro Shackleton MR.1 carrying out dummy attacks against the Royal Navy submarine HMS Sirdar (P226) during exercises in the North Sea crashes during a turn, killing 11 of the 13 people on board.
- June 26 – Three Yugoslavs armed with revolvers hijack a JAT Douglas C-47 Skytrain making a domestic flight in the Socialist Federal Republic of Yugoslavia from Zagreb to Pula with 27 people on board and force it to land at Foligno Airport in Foligno, Italy.
- June 28 – American Airlines Flight 910, a Douglas DC-6, collides with a privately owned Temco Swift while on final approach to Love Field in Dallas, Texas. The DC-6 lands with no injuries to any of the 60 people on board, but the Swift crashes, killing both occupants.

=== July ===
- July 1 – The Portuguese Air Force is formed by the amalgamation of the nation's various previous air arms.
- July 4–20 – The United States Air Force's 31st Fighter Escort Wing carries out Operation Fox Peter One, a mass deployment of 57 F-84G Thunderjets and four military transport aircraft carrying administrative and maintenance personnel from Turner Air Force Base in Albany, Georgia, to Misawa, Japan. Using air-to-air refueling, the planes make stops at Travis Air Force Base in California, Hickam Air Force Base in Hawaii, Midway Atoll in the Northwestern Hawaiian Islands, Wake Island, Eniwetok, Guam, Iwo Jima, and Yokota Air Base in Japan. The operation is the first mass movement of jet fighters across the Pacific Ocean and the longest mass movement of a complete jet fighter wing by air. It includes the first mass midair refueling movement of jet fighters, and its California-to-Hawaii flight segment is the longest mass nonstop over-water flight by jet fighters.
- July 6 – The U.S. Air Force's 308th Fighter Squadron flies from Travis Air Force Base, California, to Hickam Air Force Base, Hawaii, during Operation Fox Peter One, and its commanding officer, Major Robert J. Keen, is recognized as the first pilot to fly from Travis to Hickam in a single-engine jet employing air to air refueling, and the first officer to lead an entire squadron across the Pacific.
- July 8 – New York Airways begins inter-airport helicopter services to link Idlewild, La Guardia, and Newark airports.
- July 11
  - Aircraft from the U.S. Navy aircraft carriers USS Princeton (CV-37) and USS Bon Homme Richard (CV-31), the Royal Navy aircraft carrier HMS Ocean (R68), the U.S. Marine Corps, the U.S. Air Force, and the Royal Australian Air Force conduct a massive attack on industrial targets in and around Pyongyang, Korea.
  - A Brazilian Air Force Douglas C-47A Skytrain with 33 people on board suffers a fire in its left engine during a domestic flight in Brazil from Dois de Julho International Airport in Salvador to Galeão International Airport in Rio de Janeiro. After the entire left nacelle, engine, and landing gear detach from the aircraft and fall into the sea, the C-47A ditches in the Atlantic Ocean 200 meters (220 yards) off Maraú. Thirteen of the people on the plane are killed, including a crew member who dies after rescuing several passengers.
  - During Operation Fox Peter One, U.S. Air Force 31st Fighter Escort Wing F-84G Thunderjets encounter a large flock of albatrosses, frigate birds, and terns during takeoff from Midway Atoll. The jets suffer no damage despite ingesting about 150 birds into their engines.
- July 15 – The U.S. Air Force's 31st Fighter Escort Wing suffers its only loss of Operation Fox Peter One when one of its F-84G Thunderjets suffers an explosion and crashes while on approach to a landing at Guam, killing its pilot.
- July 15–31 – A pair of U.S. Air Force Sikorsky H-19 Chickasaws make the first transatlantic crossing by helicopter.
- July 19–20 (overnight) – Air traffic controllers at Washington National Airport in Arlington, Virginia, and Andrews Air Force Base in Prince George's County, Maryland, detect a number of unidentified flying objects (UFOs) on radar over the Washington, D.C., area, including over the United States Capitol Building and the White House, and observe some of them visually, as does the pilot of a Capitol Airlines Douglas DC-4 on the runway at Washington National Airport awaiting permission to take off. The objects disappear just before two United States Air Force F-94 Starfire fighters from New Castle Air Force Base in Delaware arrive on the scene, but reappear after the F-94s run low on fuel and leave. The objects finally disappear at dawn. Although some observers dismiss the UFOs as optical illusions created by observations of stars and meteors and phantom radar returns generated by thermal inversions, the evening's events are reported nationally by the press. It is the first of two major outbreaks of UFO sightings over Washington, D.C., seven days apart.
- July 23 – A U.S. Air Force Fairchild C-119C Flying Boxcar crashes into a beer hall in Japan just northeast of Ashiya Air Field, killing its entire crew of five and two people on the ground.
- July 26–27 (overnight) – The second major outbreak of UFO sightings over Washington, D.C., in seven days occurs. A pilot and flight attendant aboard a National Airlines plane see strange lights over their aircraft, and air traffic controllers at Washington National Airport and Andrews Air Force Base soon begin to track unidentified objects on radar which are making rapid changes in direction and speed and travelling at speeds of up to 7,000 mph (11,000 km/h). The crews of a B-25 Mitchell bomber and an Eastern Airlines airliner vectored toward the objects see nothing. Four U.S. Air Force F-94 Starfire fighters arrive from New Castle Air Force Base in Delaware; two of the fighter pilots see nothing, but the other two fighter pilots observe strange lights in the sky, as does a Capital Airlines flight departing Washington National Airport. A U.S. Air Force investigation will dismiss the sightings and radar detections as mirages caused by a temperature inversion.
- July 29
  - A U.S. Air Force RB-45C Tornado reconnaissance aircraft makes the first non-stop crossing of the Pacific Ocean by jet, refueling in the air twice along the way from KB-29 Superfortress tankers.
  - A U.S. Air Force spokesman confirms press reports that Air Force pilots have orders to intercept UFOs and shoot them down if they cannot be talked down.
- July 30 – The No. 1 engine of a Misrair SNCASE Languedoc (registration SU-AHX) catches fire during a flight from Almaza Air Base outside Cairo, Egypt, to Khartoum in the Anglo-Egyptian Sudan. The aircraft returns to Almaza and makes a belly landing. All 38 people on board survive.

=== August ===
- A massive strike by United Nations aircraft against industrial targets in and around Pyongyang, Korea, completes the destruction begun by the similar strike on July 11, 1952.
- August 4 – Off Korea, the explosion of an aircraft fuel tank causes a fire on the flight deck of the U.S. Navy aircraft carrier USS Boxer (CV-21) which kills nine and injures 30 men and destroys or damages 18 aircraft.
- August 9 – Four Royal Navy piston-engined Hawker Sea Furies encounter eight MiG-15s near Pyongyang, Korea, and Lieutenant Peter Carmichael of No. 802 Squadron FAA aboard HMS Ocean shoots one down. It is the Fleet Air Arm's first kill of the Korean War and first MiG-15 kill.
- August 12 – A fire breaks out aboard a Transportes Aéreos Nacional Douglas C-47A while it is in flight near Palmeira de Goiás, Brazil. The airliner crashes, killing all 24 people on board.
- August 16 – Braniff Airways acquires Mid-Continent Airlines.
- August 26 – A Royal Pakistan Air Force Bristol 170 Wayfarer 21P (registration G783) crashes shortly after takeoff from Khewra, Pakistan, killing all 18 people on board.
- August 28 – The first launch in combat of a guided missile by an aircraft carrier occurs when Guided Missile Unit 90 on board the U.S. Navy aircraft carrier USS Boxer (CV-21) launches a pilotless F6F-5K Hellcat loaded with explosives as a remote-controlled drone against a railway bridge at Hungnam, Korea. The unit fires five more Hellcat drones at the bridge between August 28 and September 2, scoring two hits and one near-miss.
- August 30 – At the International Aviation Exposition in Detroit, Michigan, one of a pair of Northrop F-89 Scorpion fighters flying together disintegrates in flight, killing its pilot and one spectator.

=== September ===
- Several MiG-15s approach to within 7 nautical miles (13 kilometres) of the U.S. Navy destroyer USS Bradford (DD-545) before she drives them off with gunfire.
- September 1 – In the largest carrier air strike of the Korean War, 144 U.S. Navy aircraft from the aircraft carriers USS Essex (CV-9), USS Princeton (CV-37), and USS Boxer (CV-21) attack the oil refinery at Aoji, Korea. Attacks on industrial targets at Munsan and electrical plants at Chongjin are also conducted. All U.S. aircraft return safely.
- September 6 – The de Havilland DH.110 prototype WG236 disintegrates at the Farnborough Airshow in Farnborough, Hampshire, England, and crashes, killing 29 spectators and both men aboard the plane. About another 60 spectators are injured. The accident is captured on film.
- September 10 – During a dogfight between two piston-engined United States Marine Corps F4U Corsair fighter-bombers from the escort aircraft carrier USS Sicily (CVE-118) and several MiG-15 jet fighters, Corsair pilot Captain Jesse G. Folmar shoots down a MiG-15 before being shot down himself; he survives and is rescued. It is the only Corsair victory over a MiG-15 during the Korean War.
- September 15 – Noticing that the damaged F-86 Sabre fighter of his wingman, U.S. Air Force First Lieutenant Joseph Logan, was rapidly leaking fuel over enemy-held territory, Captain James R. Risner instructs Logan to shut down his engine. Amid heavy enemy antiaircraft fire, Risner in an unprecedented maneuver twice places the nose of his own F-86 into the tailpipe of Logan's at 200 mph (320 km/h) to push Logan's powerless plane out of enemy territory. He succeeds, although Logan lands in the ocean after parachuting from the plane and drowns. Risner receives the Silver Star for his effort to save Logan.
- September 17 – Flying a Bell 47, Bell Aircraft pilot Elton J. Smith flies nonstop from Hurst, Texas, to Buffalo, New York, setting a nonstop distance record for helicopters of 1,217 miles (1,959 km).

=== October ===
- In an attempt to rescue a downed aviator, a U.S. Navy helicopter from the heavy cruiser USS Helena (CA-75) makes a 105-mile (169-km) flight, often under heavy enemy antiaircraft fire, during which the enemy attempts to jam its communications with Helena and builds fires to lure it closer to antiaircraft guns. The rescue attempt, extremely lengthy for its time, is unsuccessful.
- The U.S. Navy's Task Force 77 begins "Cherokee Strikes," in which aircraft from the task force's aircraft carriers attack enemy supply, artillery, and troop concentrations in Korea. Through January 1953, Cherokee Strikes will constitute a third of the United States Seventh Fleet's air effort in the Korean War.
- October 1 – The United States Navy reclassifies all of its "aircraft carriers" (CV) and "large aircraft carriers" (CVB) as "attack aircraft carriers" (CVA).
- October 5 – In the Soviet Union, an Aeroflot Ilyushin Il-12 (registration CCCP-L1328) on approach to Leningrad-Shosseynaya Airport in Leningrad collides in mid-air with an Aeroflot Douglas TS-62 (registration CCCP-L1055) climbing out from the airport in the opposite direction in the same air corridor. Both aircraft crash near Skvoritsky, killing all 24 people aboard the Il-12 and all seven aboard the TS-62.
- October 8
  - Twelve F2H Banshee fighters of U.S. Navy Fighter Squadron 11 (VF-11) embarked aboard the aircraft carrier USS Kearsarge (CVA-33) escort U.S. Air Force Boeing B-29 Superfortress bombers in a raid on the rail and supply center at Kowon, Korea. Minutes later, 89 aircraft from USS Essex (CVA-9), USS Princeton (CVA-37), and Kearsarge follow up with a bomb and rocket attack on Kowon.
  - A Royal Air Force Avro Shackleton MR.1 crashes into the sea off Tarbat Ness, Scotland, during a gunnery exercise, killing all 14 people on board.
- October 14 – During a flight in Brazil from São Paulo–Congonhas Airport in São Paulo to Salgado Filho Airport in Porto Alegre, an Aerovias Brasil Douglas C-47 Skytrain strays off course in poor weather and crashes near San Francisco de Paula, killing 14 of the 18 people on board.
- Mid-October – Task Force 77 carrier aircraft attack a 25-mile-long stretch of shoreline along the east coast of North Korea around the town of Kojo, on one day flying 667 sorties and losing five planes, as preparation for an amphibious landing. The carrier commanders later are infuriated to discover that no landing was planned, the attack being merely a feint to put pressure on North Korean negotiators to make peace.
- October 16 – A United States Air Force Curtis C-46D Commando crashes into the Sea of Japan just after takeoff from Kangnung Airbase in Kangnung, South Korea, killing all 25 people on board.
- October 26 – A BOAC de Havilland Comet airliner is badly damaged in an accident during take-off from Rome-Ciampino airport in Italy.

=== November ===
- In the Gulf of Mexico off Panama City, Florida, Piasecki HRP-1 Rescuer helicopters of U.S. Navy Experimental Squadron 3 (VX-3) begin tests which demonstrate for the first time the feasibility of using helicopters in aerial minesweeping.
- November 2 or 3 – The first combat between jets at night occurs, when a United States Marine Corps F3D Skyknight night fighter piloted by Major William T. Stratton and crewed by radar operator Master Sergeant Hans C. Hoglind shoots down an enemy jet aircraft over Korea they identify as a Yak-15.
- November 7 – A United States Air Force Fairchild C-119C-22-FA Flying Boxcar (registration 51–2560) crashes into Denali in the Territory of Alaska, killing all 19 people on board.
- November 14 – A U.S. Air Force Fairchild C-119C Flying Boxcar (serial number 51-2551) carrying American military personnel back to South Korea after leave in Japan crashes into a 2,000-foot (610-meter) hill near Cho-ok, South Korea, killing all 44 people on board.
- November 15
  - A U.S. Air Force Curtiss C-46D Commando (serial number 44-78144) crashes into the Sea of Japan after takeoff from Kangnung Airbase in Kangnung, South Korea, killing 11 of the 18 people on board.
  - Newark International Airport reopens. It had been closed since the crash of National Airlines Flight 101 there on February 11.
  - A U.S. Air Force Fairchild C-119C Flying Boxcar (serial number 51-2570) disappears in the Territory of Alaska during a flight from Naval Air Station Kodiak in Kodiak to Elmendorf Air Force Base in Anchorage, with the loss of all 20 people on board.
- November 18 – Off northeastern Korea, three U.S. Navy Grumman F9F-5 Panther fighters from Fighter Squadron 781 (VF-781) aboard the aircraft carrier USS Oriskany (CVA-34) engage seven MiG-15s almost certainly flown by Soviet pilots, shooting down two MiG-15s without loss to themselves. It is the last time that aircraft of a North Atlantic Treaty Organization (NATO) country shoot down Soviet or Russian aircraft until November 2015.
- November 22
  - Flying in snow and poor visibility on a domestic flight in Bulgaria from Sofia-Vrazhdebna Airport in Sofia to Gorna Oryahovitsa Airport in Gorna Oryahovitsa, a TABSO Lisunov Li-2P fails to climb high enough to clear the Balkan Mountains and crashes into 2,198-meter (7,211-foot) Mount Vezhen 20 meters (66 feet) below its summit, killing all 30 people on board.
  - During a flight from McChord Air Force Base, Washington, to Elmendorf Air Force Base in Anchorage, Alaska, a U.S. Air Force Douglas C-124A Globemaster II crashes into Alaska's Mount Gannett, killing all 52 people on board. The wreckage is identified on November 28, but then is buried in ice and snow and is not rediscovered until June 2012.
- November 28 – After the crew of a U.S. Air Force Douglas C-54G Skymaster decides to abort their approach to McChord Air Force Base in Tacoma. Washington, in dense fog and darkness and divert to Malmstrom Air Force Base in Great Falls, Montana, the aircraft strikes trees and crashes just north of McChord, catching fire and killing 37 of the 39 people on board.

=== December ===
- December 6 – A Cubana de Aviación Douglas DC-4 crashes into the Atlantic Ocean shortly after takeoff from Kindley Air Force Base in Bermuda, killing 37 of the 41 people on board and leaving all four survivors injured. It remains the deadliest aviation accident in the history of Bermuda.
- December 18 – During a dive, an Avro Canada CF-100 Canuck becomes the world's first straight-wing combat aircraft to exceed the speed of sound.
- December 20 – A United States Air Force Douglas C-124 Globemaster II, 50–100, crashes on take-off from Larson Air Force Base in Moses Lake, Washington, in the United States, killing 87 servicemen, the highest confirmed death toll of any accident in aviation history at the time.
- December 21 – Flying a Sud-Est SE 535 Mistral over a 100-kilometer (62-mile) closed circuit between Istres and Avignon, France, French aviator Jacqueline Auriol sets a women's world speed record of 855.92 km/h (531.84 mph).
- December 22 – A U.S. Air Force Lockheed F-80C Shooting Star taking off from Suwon Air Base in Suwon, South Korea, strikes a Royal Hellenic Air Force Douglas C-47D Skytrain carrying six American military patients to a hospital that taxies onto the runway in front of it, killing all 13 people on board the C-47D.
- December 25 – An Iran Air Douglas C-47A Skytrain (registration EP-ACJ) crashes on approach to Mehrabad Airport in Tehran, Iran, killing 24 of the 25 people on board. A child is the only survivor.
- December 26
  - A Royal Hellenic Air Force Douglas C-47D Skytrain fails to gain height after takeoff from Chinhae Air Base in Jinhae, South Korea, and crashes, killing all 14 people on board.
  - Wisconsin Central Airlines changes its name to North Central Airlines, and moves its headquarters from Clintonville, Wisconsin, to Minneapolis, Minnesota.
- December 30
  - During a domestic flight in the Philippines from Laoag to Aparri, a man enters the cockpit of a Philippine Air Lines Douglas DC-3 (registration PI-C38) carrying 10 people, pulls a .45-caliber pistol on the flight crew, and demands to be flown to the People's Republic of China. The pilot puts the airliner into a steep dive, but the hijacker responds by shooting and killing the pilot; he also fires two shots through the cockpit door and kills the flight steward when the flight steward knocks on the door to find out what is wrong. The copilot takes the controls and flies over the South China Sea toward China at 6,000 feet (1,800 meters) until two Republic of China Air Force T-6 Harvards from Taiwan intercept the airliner and fire machine guns at it. The DC-3 escapes, but other Republic of China Air Force fighters intercept it and force it to land at Quemoy, where the hijacker is arrested.
  - An Avro Lancaster B Mark III GR of No. 37 Squadron RAF crashes in Luqa, Malta after an engine failure. Three crew members and a civilian on the ground are killed.

== First flights ==
- Piaggio P.150
- Stits Playboy

=== January ===
- American Helicopter XH-26 Jet Jeep
- January 3 – Bristol Type 173 G-ALBN
- January 4 – North American XA2J
- January 14 – SIPA S.200 Minijet
- January 21 – Saab 210

=== February ===
- Republic RF-84F Thunderflash

=== March ===
- March 2 – Piper Twin Stinson
- March 3 – Ilyushin Il-46
- March 13 – CASA C-202 Halcón

=== April ===
- April 11 – Piasecki H-21
- April 15 – Boeing YB-52 49–231
- April 18 – Convair YB-60
- April 27 – Tupolev "88" prototype of Tupolev Tu-16

=== May ===
- May 19 – Grumman XF10F Jaguar
- May 20 – Caproni Trento F-5
- May 26
  - Cessna 180 N41697
  - Stits SA-2A Sky Baby
- May 30 – Beriev R-1

=== June ===
- June 4 – LIBIS KB-6
- June 5 – Max Plan PF.204 Busard
- June 19 – Yak-120 prototype of Yakovlev Yak-25
- June 20 – AISA I-115
- June 27 – Bell X-2 (unpowered)
- June 30 – American Helicopter XH-26 Jet Jeep

=== July ===
- July 3 – Yak-24 twin engine tandem helicopter
- July 11 – Farman F.500 Monitor I
- July 12 – Beecraft Honey Bee
- July 23 – Fouga Magister
- July 31 – SNCASE SE.3120 Alouette

=== August ===
- August 6 – Boulton Paul P.120 VT951
- August 16 – Bristol BritanniaG-ALBO
- August 22 – Saunders-Roe Princess G-ALUN
- August 30 – Avro VulcanVX770

=== September ===
- Early September – Avro Canuck CF-100 Canuck Mark 3
- September 5 – OKB-1 150 (or Junkers EF 150)
- September 10 – BOMARC surface-to-air missile
- September 20 – Douglas X-3 Stiletto
- September 28 – Dassault Mystère IV
- September 30 – GAM-63 RASCAL surface-to-air missile

=== October ===
- October 7 – Macchi M.B.323
- October 11 – Avro Canada CF-100 Canuck Mark 4 prototype
- October 15 – Douglas X-3 Stiletto 2892 (unofficial 1-mile (1.6 km) "hop" during high-speed taxi test)
- October 16 – Sud Aviation Vautour
- October 20 – Douglas X-3 Stiletto 2892 (first official flight)
- October 23 – Hughes XH-17
- October 25 – Piaggio P.150
- October 28 – Douglas XA3D-1

=== November ===
- November 3 – Saab Lansen
- November 11 – Matra-Cantinieau MC-101
- November 17 – Max Holste 1521 Broussard
- November 20 – Percival Pembroke

=== December ===
- December 2 – Short SB.5
- December 4 – Grumman XS2F-1 Tracker
- December 4 – Nardi FN.333
- December 24 – Handley Page VictorWB771

== Entered service ==
- Late 1952 – Handley Page Marathon with West African Airways Corporation

=== January ===
- January 13 – Lockheed Neptune with Royal Air Force
- January 22 – de Havilland DH.106 Comet with BOAC

=== March ===
- March 13 – Airspeed Ambassador with BEA
- March 28 – Convair CV-340 with United Air Lines rch

=== June ===
- June 17 – Airship ZPN-1 with the United States Navy

=== August ===
- de Havilland Venom with the Royal Air Force

=== November ===
- Grumman F9F Cougar with U.S. Navy Fighter Squadron 32 (VF-32)

== Retirements ==
- Bristol Brabazon by the Bristol Aeroplane Company

=== October ===
- Stits SA-2A Sky Baby
