= Macchi M.B.323 =

1952 Italian single-engine basic training monoplane

Macchi MB.323
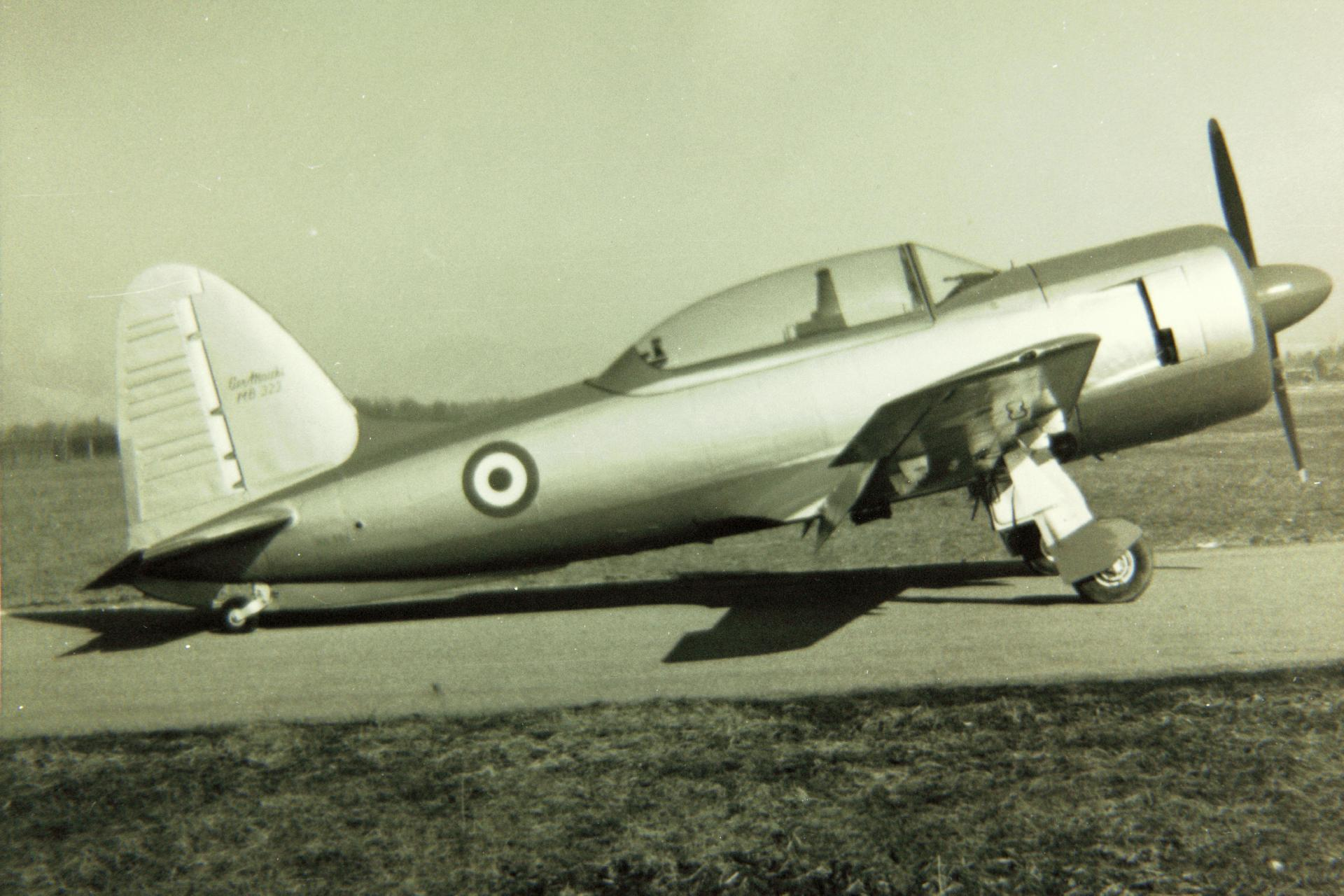

General information
- Type: Training monoplane
- National origin: Italy
- Manufacturer: Macchi
- Number built: 2

History
- First flight: 1952

The Macchi MB.323 was an Italian single-engine basic training monoplane designed and built by Macchi. No orders were placed and only a prototype was built.

== Design and development ==
Designed as a basic trainer to complement the M.416 in Italian military service, the MB.323 first flew in 1952. It was a single-engine, low-wing cantilever monoplane powered by a nose-mounted Pratt & Whitney Wasp radial engine and a retractable tailwheel landing gear. It had two tandem cockpits covered by a sliding one-piece canopy. The type was evaluated against the Fiat G.49 which was preferred by the air force and the MB.323 did not enter production.

== Operators ==
Italy

- Italian Air Force operated two aircraft for evaluation test

== Specifications ==
Data from Jane's All The World's Aircraft 1953-54.

General characteristics

- Crew: 2
- Length: 9.80 m (32 ft 2 in)
- Wingspan: 12.40 m (40 ft 8 in)
- Height: 4.04 m (13 ft 3 in)
- Wing area: 22.0 m^{2} (237 sq ft)
- Empty weight: 1,690 kg (3,726 lb)
- Gross weight: 2,250 kg (4,960 lb)
- Powerplant: 1 × Pratt & Whitney R-1340-AN-1 Wasp nine-cylinder radial engine, 450 kW (610 hp)

Performance

- Maximum speed: 374 km/h (232 mph, 202 kn) at 2,900 m (9,500 ft)
- Cruise speed: 326 km/h (203 mph, 176 kn) at 2,000 m (6,600 ft) (70% power)
- Range: 1,080 km (670 mi, 580 nmi)
- Service ceiling: 7,500 m (24,600 ft)
- Time to altitude: 2 min 2 s to 1,000 m (3,300 ft)

Armament

- Guns: 1 × 7.9 mm machine gun in port wing
- Bombs: racks for practice bombs

== See also ==
Aircraft of comparable role, configuration, and era

- CAC Winjeel
- Fiat G.49
- I.Ae. 22 DL
- Percival Provost
- Piaggio P.150
- Valmet Vihuri
- Yakovlev Yak-11
