= Torsti =

Torsti is both a given name and a surname. Notable people with the name include:

- Torsti Lehtinen (1942–2023), Finnish writer and philosopher
- Torsti Verkkola (1909–1977), Finnish aircraft designer, researcher, and professor
- Samu Torsti (born 1991), Finnish alpine skier
