= Heininen =

Surname list

Heininen is a surname. Notable people with the surname include:

- Kaarlo Heininen (1853–1926), Finnish politician
- Paavo Heininen (1938–2022), Finnish composer and pianist

== See also ==
- Heinonen
