= G49 =

G49 or G.49 may refer to:

- Fiat G.49, a 1952 Italian two-seat basic trainer aircraft
- HMAS Norman (G49), a 1940 Royal Australian Navy N class destroyer
