= Fiat G.49 =

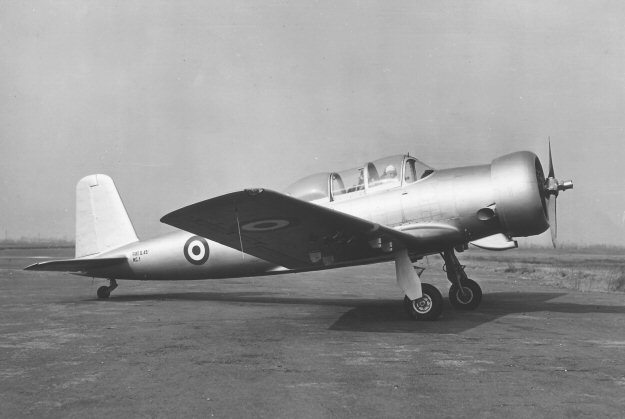
- Fiat G-49 ver.1

General information
- Type: Two-seat basic trainer
- Manufacturer: Fiat
- Designer: Giuseppe Gabrielli
- Primary user: Aeronautica Militare
- Number built: 3

History
- First flight: September 1952

The Fiat G.49 was an Italian two-seat basic trainer designed by Giuseppe Gabrielli and built by Fiat.

== Design and development ==
The G.49 was designed by Gabrielli as a replacement for the World War II-era US North American T-6 advanced trainer and was first flown in September 1952. The G.49 was an all-metal low-wing cantilever monoplane with retractable tailwheel landing gear. It had an enclosed cockpit with a raised canopy for a pupil and instructor in tandem. Two variants were built with different engine installations; the G.49-1 with an Alvis Leonides radial engine and the G.49-2 with a Pratt & Whitney radial engine.

== Operational history ==
The aircraft did not sell and only a small number were operated by the Italian Air Force.

== Variants ==
G.49-1
Variant powered by a 410 kW (550 hp) Alvis Leonides 502/4 Mk 24 radial engine.
G.49-2
Variant powered by a 450 kW (600 hp) Pratt & Whitney R-1340-S3H1 Wasp radial engine.
G.49-3
Variant powered by a 466 kW (625 hp) I.Ae. 19R El Indio radial engine.

== Operators ==
Italy

- Italian Air Force operated two Fiat G.49s for evaluation testing.

== Specifications (G.49-2) ==
Data from The Illustrated Encyclopedia of Aircraft (Part Work 1982-1985), 1985, Orbis Publishing, Page 1798

General characteristics

- Crew: two (pupil, instructor)
- Length: 9.50 m (31 ft 2 in)
- Wingspan: 13 m (42 ft 7.75 in)
- Height: 2.65 m (8 ft 8.25 in)
- Empty weight: 2,240 kg (4,983 lb)
- Gross weight: 2,860 kg (6,305 lb)
- Powerplant: 1 × Pratt & Whitney R-1340-S3H1 Wasp 9-cylinder radial piston engine , 455 kW (610 hp)

Performance

- Maximum speed: 370 km/h (230 mph, 200 kn)
- Range: 1,900 km (1,181 mi, 1,026 nmi)
- Service ceiling: 6,800 m (22,300 ft)

== See also ==
Aircraft of comparable role, configuration, and era

- CAC Winjeel
- I.Ae. 22 DL
- Macchi M.B.323
- Percival Provost
- Piaggio P.150
- Valmet Vihuri
- Yakovlev Yak-11
