= VL Myrsky =

Finnish fighter aircraft

Myrsky
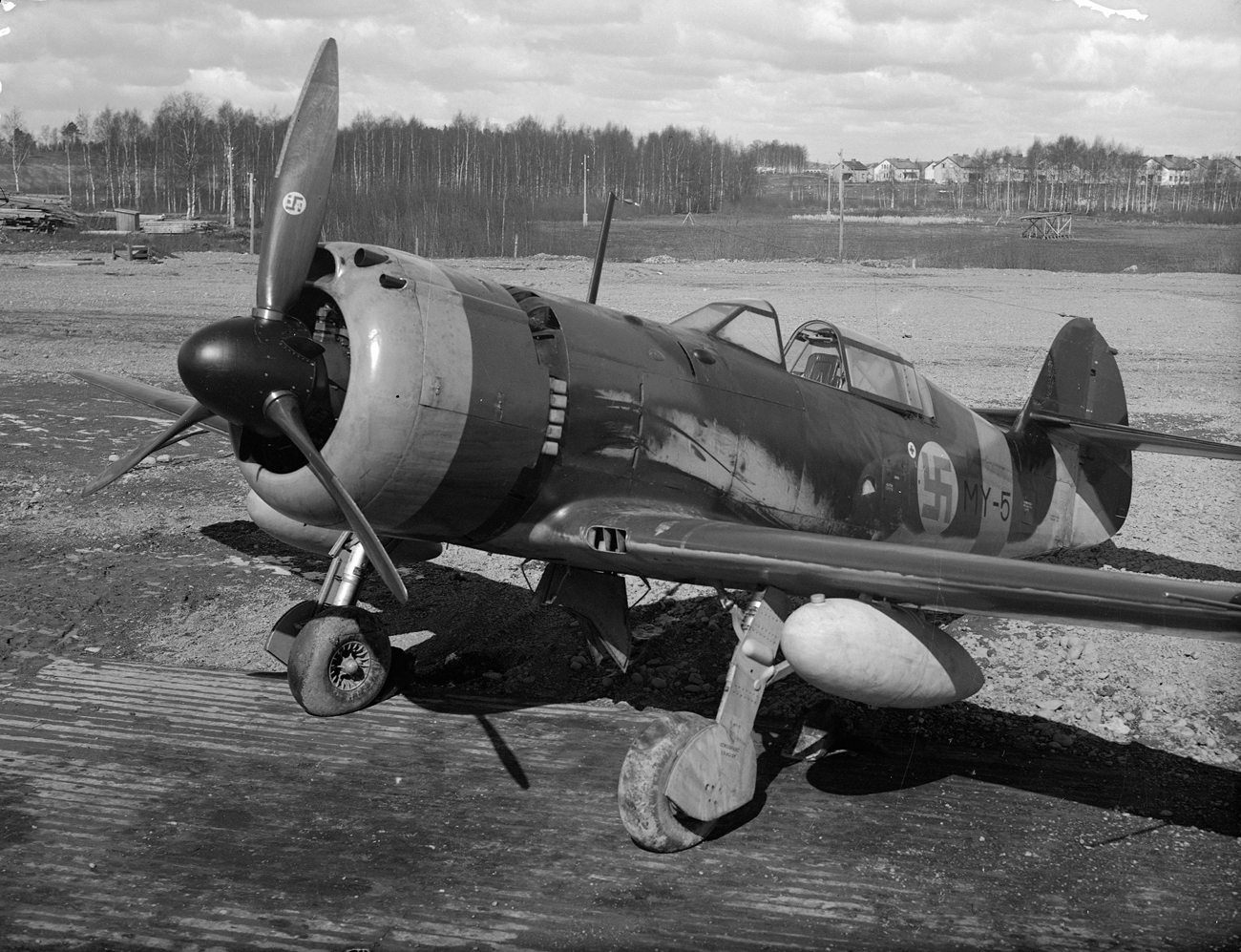
- A Finnish Air Force VL Myrsky II in 1944

General information
- Type: Reconnaissance, fighter
- National origin: Finland
- Manufacturer: Valtion lentokonetehdas
- Designer: Edward Wegelius; Martti Vainio; Torsti Verkkola
- Primary user: Finnish Air Force (historical)
- Number built: 51

History
- Introduction date: 1943
- First flight: 23 December 1941
- Retired: 1947 (Finland)

The VL Myrsky ("Storm") is a Finnish World War II fighter aircraft originally developed by Valtion lentokonetehdas for the Finnish Air Force. The models of the aircraft were Myrsky I, Myrsky II, and Myrsky III.

It was designed by Edward Wegelius, Martti Vainio and Torsti Verkkola who worked at Valtion lentokonetehdas.

== Development ==
The decision to start developing a new fighter for the Finnish Air Force was based on experience gained before the Winter War: in the "arms race" leading up to a war, smaller nations can have difficulty purchasing top-of-the-line fighters without a significant political cost. The Finnish Air Force requested preliminary proposals for a domestic fighter from State Aircraft Factory (Valtion Lentokonetehdas) in early 1939, before the Winter War. State Aircraft Factory prepared five alternative proposals by May 1939. After that, The Ministry of Defence ordered the fighter design from State Aircraft Factory in June 1939.

The preliminary design was made by the aircraft-designer trio Arvo Ylinen (head of the design-bureau), Martti Vainio (aerodynamics), and Torsti Verkkola (structural design). Edward Wegelius was appointed head of the design department of the State Aircraft Factory when Ylinen later moved on to the Helsinki University of Technology in August 1940. VL did not appoint any main constructor to its products, such as the German aircraft manufacturers did.

Due to difficulties obtaining duraluminium, the wings were made out of plywood and the fuselage was metal structure with a fabric and plywood skin. The planned Bristol Taurus III engine was not available due to war, so a Pratt & Whitney R-1830 (civil Twin Wasp) was chosen. Availability of this engine was also problematic, so the first prototype used an R-1830-S3C3-G, while later prototypes and production fighters used less-powerful SC3-Gs. Finland bought these engines from German war booty stocks.

The first Myrsky prototype flew on 23 December 1941. The prototype was fully functional, but too heavy. After some modifications they soon had three new prototype aircraft. The test flights showed some structural problems during high-speed tests. All three prototypes were destroyed during test flights; two test pilots died, one was seriously injured. The culprit was found to be aeroelastic flutter, which was a poorly known phenomenon at the time. Resolving the flutter problem took almost a year.

Series production started in autumn 1942 far before German deliveries of Messerschmitt Bf 109 had begun in 1943. The series production version was called the Myrsky II. 47 Myrsky IIs were built and together with the Myrsky I version and Myrsky prototype the production amounted to 51 in all. Although the aircraft met the specifications set for it, it did not fulfill all expectations due to structural problems.

The Myrsky III was ordered in spring 1943, but none were built.

== Operational history ==
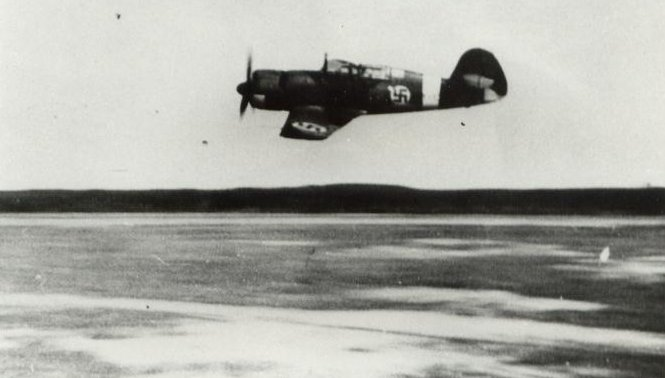
A VL Myrsky II of the Finnish Air Force in flight

Reconnaissance Squadron 12 received their first Myrskys during August 1944. Thirty Myrskys were delivered to Reconnaissance Squadrons 12 and 16 before the end of the Continuation War.

Fifteen Myrsky fighters flew 68 missions during the Continuation War. During one mission, they met Soviet Yak-7s, but the fight ended without losses for either side. During two other missions, Myrskys damaged two Soviet fighters, which were both destroyed on landing. Six Myrskys took part in a bombing mission on 3 September 1944.

During the Lapland War, six Myrskys flew 13 reconnaissance missions during November 1944. The wooden construction proved problematic in this theatre, not enduring wet weather or cold well. The war time Lukko glue, manufactured from ersatz materials, which was used for gluing the wooden parts, did not stand rain, frost and humidity, and the glue seams disintegrated, sometimes with disastrous results.

Ten Myrskys were lost in accidents between 1943 and 1947 and four pilots died. Myrsky usage ended in May 1947 and the last Myrsky flight was in February 1948.

The Myrsky proved fast and manoeuvrable enough to dogfight the contemporary Soviet aircraft; it was the second fastest Finnish Air Force airplane after the Messerschmitt Bf 109G. Pilots liked the plane as it had good cockpit ergonomics and decent flight and ground handling properties. Its aerodynamic design was excellent, and was later used on the VL Pyörremyrsky fighter and the Valmet Vihuri trainer. Its wide undercarriage gave it decent ground-handling properties. Its main drawback was the construction method: the substitute materials simply did not stand up to the harsh Finnish weather.

== Survivors ==
Three Myrsky fuselages and several parts have survived. The Finnish Aviation Museum is currently (2023) restoring one of them (MY-14) into a complete museum aircraft. The project was on display at Finnish Air Force 100th anniversary air show at Tikkakoski, Jyväskylä 16 to 17 June 2018. The aircraft will be on permanent display at the Finnish Air Force Museum by 2025.

== Variants ==
Myrsky
Prototype, 1 built
Myrsky I
Preproduction aircraft, 3 built
Myrsky II
Series-production aircraft, 47 built
Myrsky III
10 being built but cancelled

== Operators ==
Finland

- Finnish Air Force

== Specifications (VL Myrsky II) ==
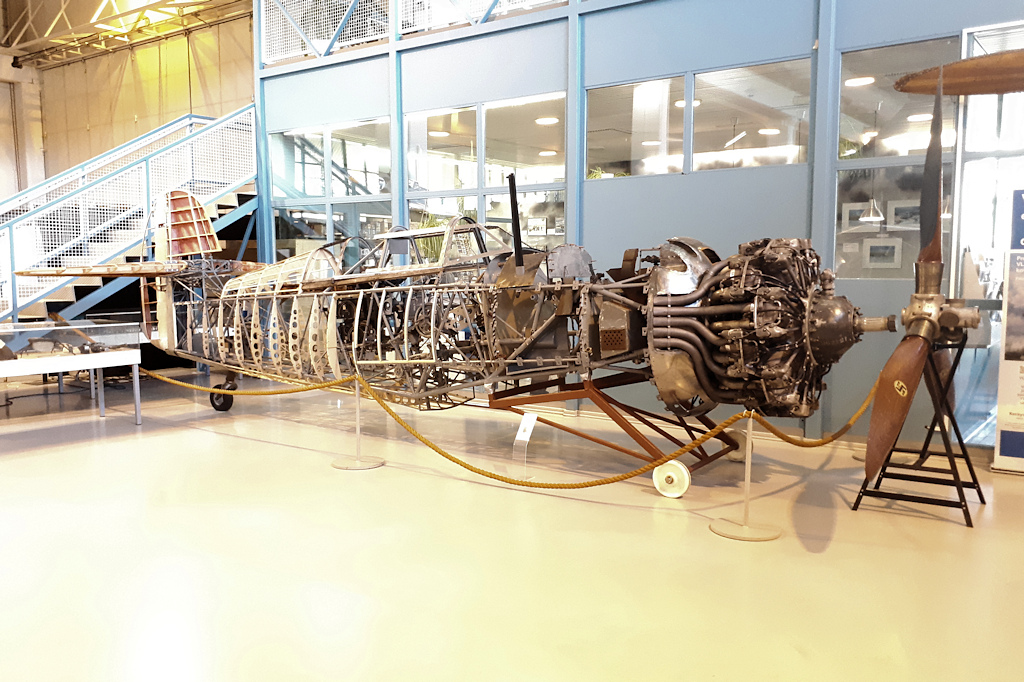
A rebuild VL Myrsky II on static display at the Finnish Aviation Museum in Vantaa, Finland

Data from War Planes of the Second World War - Fighters Vol.1

General characteristics

- Crew: 1
- Length: 8.35 m (27 ft 5 in)
- Wingspan: 11 m (36 ft 1 in)
- Height: 3 m (9 ft 10 in)
- Wing area: 18.000 m^{2} (193.75 sq ft)
- Empty weight: 2,332 kg (5,141 lb)
- Gross weight: 2,947 kg (6,497 lb)
- Max takeoff weight: 3,211 kg (7,080 lb)
- Fuel capacity: 300 L (79 US gal; 66 imp gal) internal plus 2 × 150 L (40 US gal; 33 imp gal) drop tanks
- Powerplant: 1 × SFA-built Pratt & Whitney R-1830-SC3-G Twin Wasp 14-cylinder two-row air-cooled radial piston engine, 794 kW (1,065 hp)
- Propellers: 3-bladed VLS 8002 constant-speed propeller

Performance

- Maximum speed: 529.5 km/h (329.0 mph, 285.9 kn)
- Cruise speed: 399 km/h (248 mph, 215 kn)
- Range: 499 km (310 mi, 269 nmi) internals only
- Ferry range: 933.5 km (580.1 mi, 504.0 nmi)
- Endurance: 3 hours maximum
- Service ceiling: 9,500 m (31,200 ft)
- Rate of climb: 15 m/s (3,000 ft/min)
- Wing loading: 177 kg/m^{2} (36 lb/sq ft)
- Power/mass: 3.0 kg/hp (6.6 lb/hp)

Armament

- Guns: 4 × 12.7 mm (0.50 in) VKT LKk/42 machine guns (un-licensed modification of the 13,2 mm FN Browning M.1939)
- Bombs: 2 × 100 kg (220 lb) bombs

Avionics

- Gunsight - TH-m/44 KK
- Radio - FuG VIIa

== See also ==
Aircraft of comparable role, configuration, and era

- Bloch 150
- CAC Boomerang
- Curtiss P-36
- FFVS 22
- Fokker D.XXI
- IAR 80
- Lavochkin La-5, Lavochkin La-7, Lavochkin La-9
- Mitsubishi A6M Zero
- North American P-64
- Republic P-43 Lancer
- Vultee P-66 Vanguard
- Yakovlev Yak-3

Related lists

- List of fighter aircraft
- List of aircraft of World War II
