= Heinonen (disambiguation) =

Heinonen is a Finnish surname

Heinonen may also refer to:

- Heinonen HK-1, Finnish single-seat, single-engined sport aircraft of the 1950s
- Heinonen Lake, lake by Jyväskylä, Central Finland
