= Torsti Verkkola =

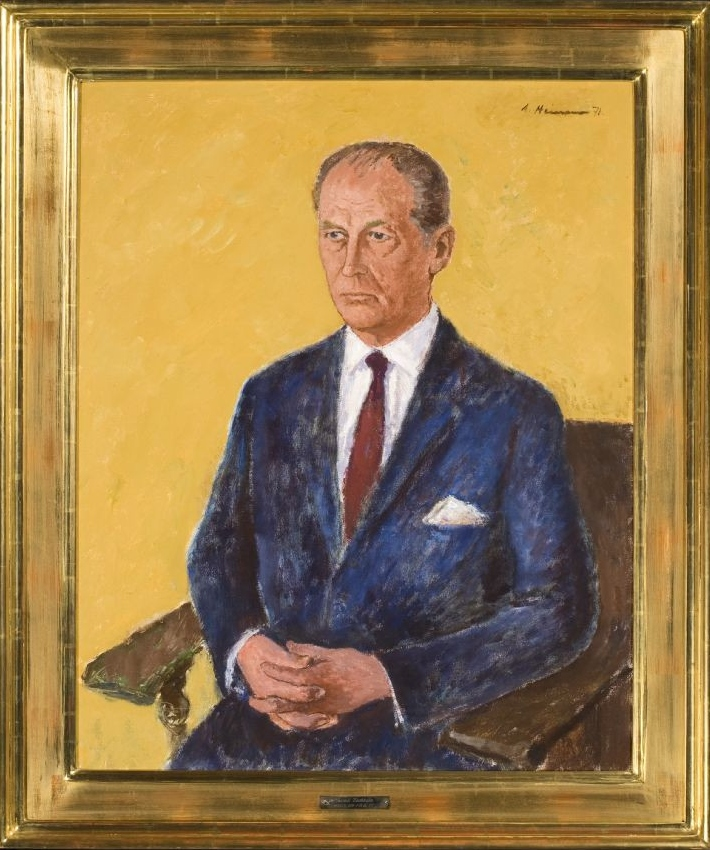
Portrait of Torsti Veikkola by Aarre Heinonen (1971).

Torsti Rafael Verkkola (May 22, 1909, Lahti – June 11, 1977) was a Finnish aircraft designer, researcher and professor.

== Biography ==
Born to train driver Karl Wennström and Matilda Vilen in Lahti, he changed his surname from the Swedish Wennström to the Finnish Verkkola in 1935. He married Impi Inkeri Niinivaara in 1939 and together they had two children, Matti and Marja.

He graduated from college in 1928, and received his diplomi-insinööri (MSc) degree in 1935. He studied at Technische Hochschule Berlin between 1935 and 1937 and did several study trips to Europe and North America.

He worked for Valtion lentokonetehdas (VL) from 1935 to 1945. He was chief designer from 1937 to 1941, later serving in administrative roles until 1944. During his time at VL, he participated in the design of VL Myrsky, VL Pyörremyrsky, and VL Pyry. He held the military grade of Captain of Engineering.

In 1945, he was appointed a professorship in mechanical engineering at the Helsinki Polytechnics Helsinki Polytechnic and served in that position until 1948; he was dean of the university between 1968 and 1970. Between 1946 and 1951, he served as a visiting professor at the University of Wisconsin. From 1954 until 1972, he was professor of combustion motor engineering. He retired in 1972.
