= VL Pyörremyrsky =

1940s Finnish fighter aircraft

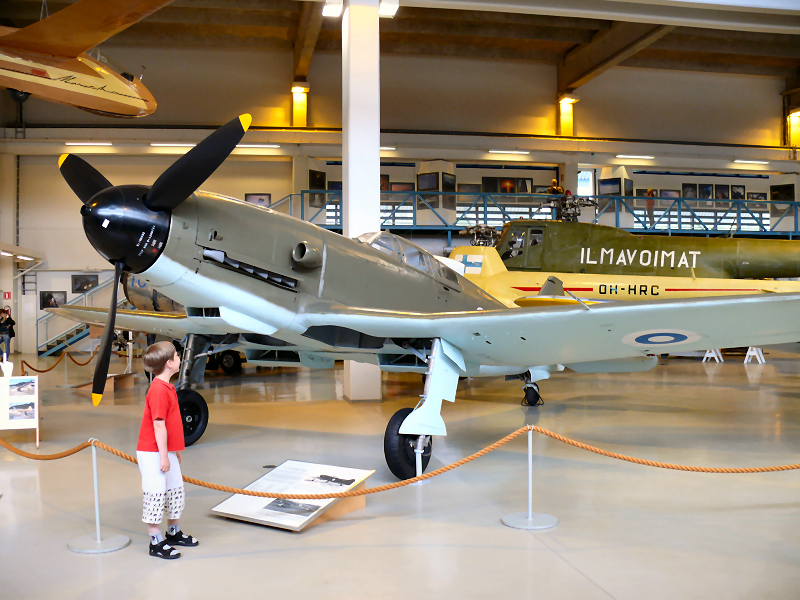

General information
- Type: Prototype fighter
- National origin: Finland
- Manufacturer: Valtion lentokonetehdas
- Designer: Torsti Verkkola
- Status: Retired
- Primary user: Finnish Air Force
- Number built: 1

History
- First flight: 21 November 1945
- Retired: 1947

The VL Pyörremyrsky ("Hurricane") is a Finnish fighter plane, designed by DI Torsti Verkkola at the State Aircraft Factory (Valtion lentokonetehdas) for service with the Finnish Air Force in World War II. The war ended before the type's first flight and only a prototype was built.

== History ==
On 26 November 1942 the Finnish Air Force ordered two Pyörremyrsky prototypes to be built. The aircraft were to be ready by May 1944. One prototype was later cancelled and only one aircraft was ever built. The aircraft designation VMT Pyörremyrsky is also sometimes used, as the factory had been formed into the State Metal Factories (Valtion Metallitehtaat) during the construction of the aircraft. The Finnish Air Force airplane code letters PM gave the plane nickname Puu-Mersu (Wooden Messerschmitt), but the plane was an independent design.

The use of wood in the construction of the aircraft was maximized due to the scarcity of metals. The goal was to create a fighter with similar flight qualities to the German Messerschmitt Bf 109G. The engine and the propeller were taken from the Bf 109G. The landing gear was significantly widened and installed on the wing instead of fuselage in order make it better to land on field airfields. This significantly eased ground control, as well as take off and landing, while slightly impeding top speed as a consequence of the thickening of the wings to accommodate landing gear hydraulics.

The Pyörremyrsky prototype PM-1 made its first flight on 21 November 1945 at Härmälä, piloted by Esko Halme. After 25 minutes of flying, a piece from the cowling fell off and Halme had to land when fumes from the engine started to enter the cockpit. The pilot was saved by his oxygen mask. The aircraft was to fly only three test flights in Tampere, the third time being a transfer flight to Kuorevesi on 16 January 1946. There it flew an additional 31 test flights, the total flight time being 27 hours by 1947. The aircraft was flown by eight pilots: Esko Halme, Lauri Hämäläinen, Erkki Itävuori, Osmo Kauppinen, Lasse Heikinaro, Martti Laitinen, Heikki Keso and Lauri Lautamäki. The last flight lasted only 20 minutes and was made by captain Osmo Kauppinen on 22 July 1947.

The Pyörremyrsky design was considered quite successful. It could outclimb the Bf 109G-6 and it was very manoeuvrable. It was considered almost ready for mass production. Its only major problem with the design was found to be the low-quality glue used in the joints.

The aircraft was still in the prototype stage when the war ended and this also meant that the funds allocated for the project decreased. The Pyörremyrsky prototype was grounded after only some 30 hours of flying and the programme terminated as no funds were available for the purchase of new aircraft for the Finnish Air Force and sufficient Bf 109Gs remained in service to equip the fighter force that was permitted under the Armistice terms. The PM-1 was removed from FAF lists on 1 April 1953. The wing construction was later used in another Finnish aircraft, the all-metal Valmet Vihuri trainer.

== Aircraft on display ==
The PM-1 prototype can today be seen at the Aviation Museum of Central Finland in Tikkakoski.

== Specifications ==
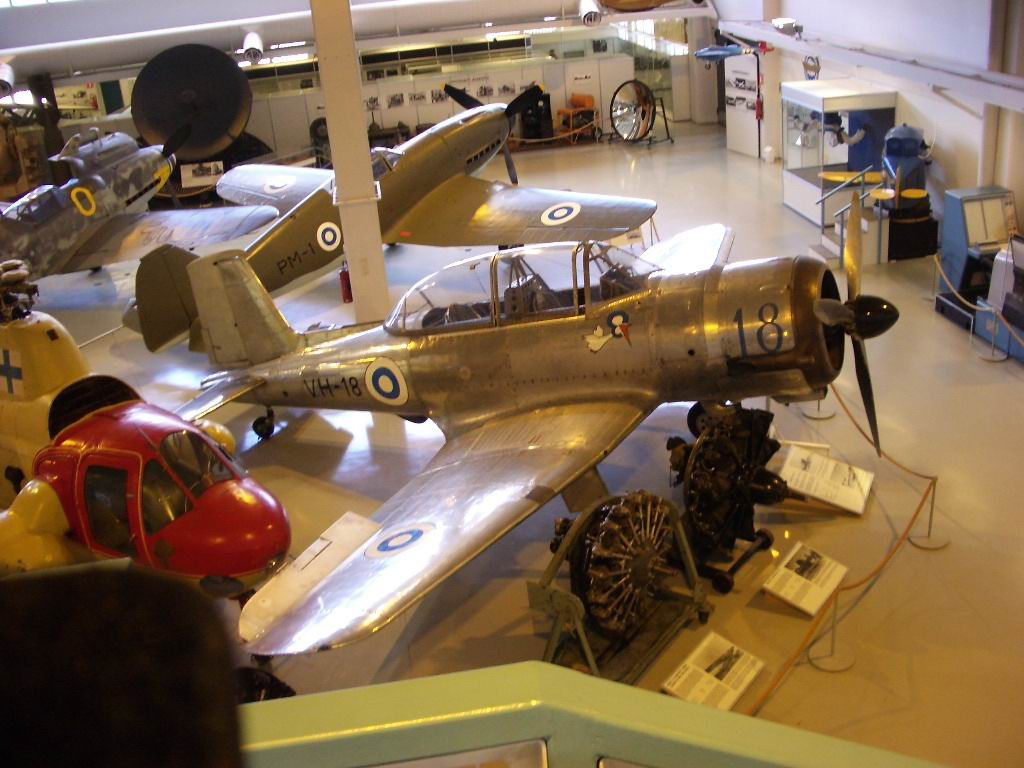
Another view of the VL Pyörremyrsky (behind the pole, next to a Messerschmitt Bf 109) with a Valmet Vihuri in the foreground.

Data from Air Enthusiast 1971

General characteristics

- Crew: 1
- Length: 9.13 m (29 ft 11 in)
- Wingspan: 10.38 m (34 ft 1 in)
- Height: 3.89 m (12 ft 9 in)
- Wing area: 19 m^{2} (200 sq ft)
- Airfoil: root: NACA 0019; tip: NACA 23009
- Empty weight: 2,619 kg (5,774 lb)
- Max takeoff weight: 3,310 kg (7,297 lb)
- Powerplant: 1 × Daimler-Benz DB 605AC V-12 inverted liquid-cooled piston engine, 1,100 kW (1,500 hp)
- Propellers: 3-bladed constant-speed propeller

Performance

- Maximum speed: 620 km/h (390 mph, 330 kn)
- Service ceiling: 11,250 m (36,910 ft)
- Rate of climb: 18.5 m/s (3,640 ft/min)
- Wing loading: 174 kg/m^{2} (36 lb/sq ft)

Armament

- Guns:
  - 2 × 12.7 mm LKk/42 machine guns with 300 rpg (proposed but not fitted to prototype)
  - 1 × 20 mm mg MG 151/20 with 200 rpg (proposed but not fitted to prototype)
- Bombs:
  - 4 × 50 kg bombs
  - 4 × 100 kg bombs

== See also ==
Related development

- Valmet Vihuri

Aircraft of comparable role, configuration, and era

- CAC CA-15
- Curtiss P-40Q
- Fiat G.55
- Macchi C.205
- Hawker Tempest Mk III/IV
- Martin-Baker MB 5
- Messerschmitt Bf 109K
- Nakajima Ki-63
- North American P-51D/H Mustang
- Reggiane Re.2005
- Supermarine Spitfire Mk IV/XII/XIV
- Yakovlev Yak-3
