= VL Pyry =

1930s Finnish military trainer aircraft

Pyry
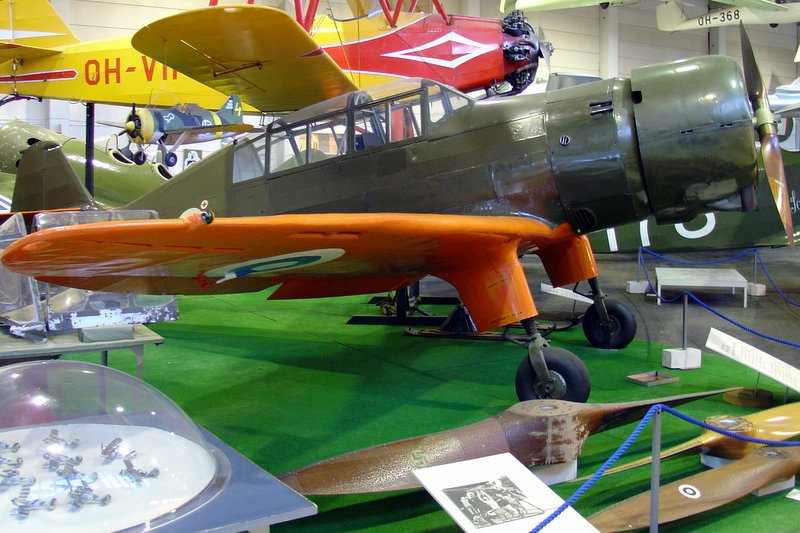
- VL Pyry at the Finnish Aviation Museum

General information
- Type: Reconnaissance/fighter
- Manufacturer: Valtion lentokonetehdas
- Status: Retired
- Primary user: Finnish Air Force
- Number built: 41

History
- Introduction date: 1941
- First flight: 29 March 1939
- Retired: 7 September 1962

VL Pyry (Finnish language for blizzard) was a Finnish low-winged, two-seated fighter trainer aircraft, built by the State Aircraft Factory (Valtion lentokonetehdas) for use with the Finnish Air Force. The Pyry was in use from 1939 to 1962. The aircraft was a mixed construction of wood, steel, fabric, and duraluminium.

== History ==
In 1937 a prototype, the VL Pyry I, with the identification number PY-1, was ordered by the Finnish Air Force. It was designed by Martti Vainio, Torsti Verkkola, and Edward Wegelius, with Arvo Ylinen being the chief designer. The PY-1s first flight was on 29 March, 1939. 40 aircraft were ordered in May of 1940 and were delivered in 1941. They were given the name VL Pyry II, with the ID designations of PY2-PY41. The Air Force School in Kauhava was the first unit to receive the new aircraft. Around 700 pilots were trained in the aircraft and the type accumulated over 56,000 flying hours over a service life of 20 years. PY-1 and PY-27 made the final official flights of this series in Härmälä on 7 September 1962.

The plane was tricky to fly, and shown to be unstable and prone to wingtip stalls. In an attempt to fix the wingtip stall issue, four Pyrys (PY-1, -24, -32 and -37) were equipped with trapezoidal wings, as well as serving to test these structures for the VL Myrsky. While these new wings did reduce the risk of stalls, they made the aircraft even more unstable than before. In 1942 all planes were grounded to fix a problem with horizontal stabilizer struts breaking, and the original struts were replaced with V struts, resulting in a more tail-heavy aircraft. To improve stability, the engine mount was lengthened by 16.5cm in 1944, but it was still a difficult plane to fly for inexperienced pilots. It was said if a cadet learned to fly on Pyry, he would later master just any kind of aircraft.

There were 28 accidents of VL Pyry. All together 27 pilots died. The first accident was on 15 June 1941 in Hyvinkää. Pilot Kauno Osmo Meriluoto died.

The aircraft's final flights were made by PY-1 and PY-27 September 6, 1962.

== Surviving aircraft ==
- The PY-1 prototype can be found at the Kauhava Aircraft Park.
- PY-27 is at the Finnish Aviation Museum in Vantaa.
- PY-35 at the Finnish Air Force Museum in Tikkakoski.
- The remains of PY-5 are at the Finnish Air Force Museum in Tikkakoski.
- The remains of PY-26 are at the Päijänne Tavastia Aviation Museum in Asikkala.

== Operators ==
Finland
Finnish Air Force

== Specifications (VL Pyry II) ==
Data from

General characteristics

- Crew: 2
- Length: 7.7 m (25 ft 3 in)
- Wingspan: 9.8 m (32 ft 2 in)
- Height: 2.55 m (8 ft 4 in)
- Wing area: 12.7 m^{2} (137 sq ft)
- Empty weight: 1,045 kg (2,304 lb)
- Gross weight: 1,535 kg (3,384 lb)
- Powerplant: 1 × Wright R-975-E3 Whirlwind nine-cylinder air-cooled radial piston engine, 340 kW (450 hp) at 2,250 rpm for take-off
- Propellers: 2-bladed variable-pitch propeller

Performance

- Maximum speed: 330 km/h (210 mph, 180 kn)
- Cruise speed: 286 km/h (178 mph, 154 kn)
- Range: 1,050 km (650 mi, 570 nmi)
- Service ceiling: 5,600 m (18,400 ft)
- Rate of climb: 5 m/s (980 ft/min)
- Time to altitude: 1,000 m (3,300 ft) - 2 minutes 28 seconds
  2,000 m (6,600 ft) - 5 minutes 7 seconds
  3,000 m (9,800 ft) - 8 minutes 27 seconds
  4,000 m (13,000 ft) - 12 minutes 43 seconds
  5,000 m (16,000 ft) - 20 minutes 10 seconds
- Wing loading: 120.87 kg/m^{2} (24.76 lb/sq ft)
- Power/mass: 0.201 kW/kg (0.068 hp/lb)

Armament

- Guns: 1x 7.7 mm (0.303 in) Browning machine gun with 480 rounds
