= Heinonen =

Heinonen is a Finnish surname of Virtanen type. Notable people with the surname include:

- Aarre Heinonen (1906–2003), painter and professor
- Adam Heinonen (born 2002), Swedish tennis player
- Arttu Heinonen (born 1999), Finnish footballer
- Eero Heinonen (born 1979), Finnish bassist
- Eki Heinonen (born 1967), Finnish sailor
- Elmo Heinonen (born 1997), Finnish footballer
- Jan Heinonen (born 2002), Finnish footballer
- Juha Heinonen (1960–2007), Finnish mathematician
- Juhani Heinonen (born 1940), Finnish curler and coach
- Kaarlo Heinonen (1878–1944), Finnish politician
- Marjut Heinonen (born 1976), Finnish sport shooter
- Minna Heinonen (born 1967), Finnish archer
- Olavi Heinonen (1921–1992), Finnish diver
- Olavi Heinonen (judge) (1938–2024), Finnish judge
- Olli Heinonen (born 1946), Finnish nuclear expert
- Olli Heinonen (footballer) (born 1937), Finnish footballer
- Olli-Pekka Heinonen (born 1964), Finnish politician
- Osku Heinonen (born 1992), Finnish basketball player
- Pekka Heinonen (1940–2017), Finnish diver
- Petri Heinonen (born 1988), Finnish basketball player
- Raimo Heinonen (born 1935), Finnish gymnast
- Sofía Heinonen (born 1969), Argentine conservationist
- Timo Heinonen (born 1975), Finnish politician
- Vappu Heinonen (1905–1999) Finnish social worker and politician
- Veikko Heinonen (1934–2015), Finnish ski jumper
