= Valmet Vihuri =

1950s Finnish military trainer aircraft

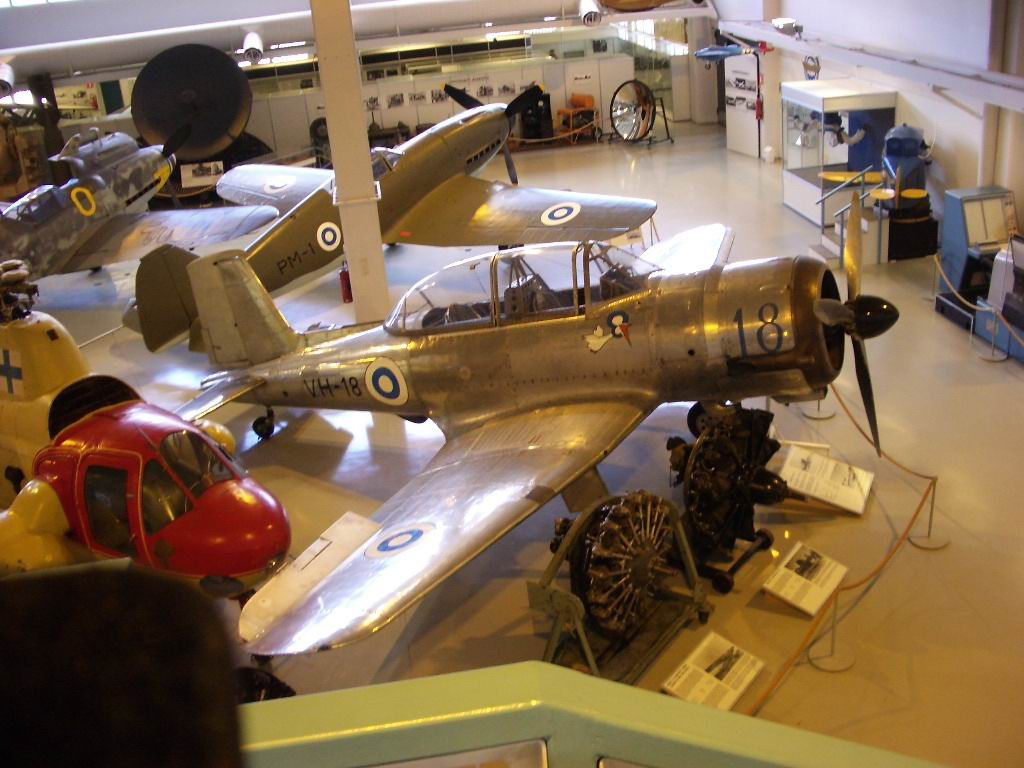

General information
- Type: Trainer
- Manufacturer: Valmet
- Primary user: Finnish Air Force
- Number built: 51

History
- First flight: February 6, 1951
- Retired: 1959

Valmet Vihuri (Finnish for Gale) was a Finnish advanced two-seat fighter trainer aircraft, serving in the Finnish Air Force between 1953 and 1959. (Note: This aircraft is not to be confused with the Finnish fast bomber variant of De Havilland Mosquito, with DB 605 engines, a project which never materialized. In 1943 the FiAF HQ asked VL if it would be possible to build a copy of the Mosquito with DB605 engines. Two crashed British aircraft would have been requested from Germany to serve as models. The primary attraction was the wooden construction (something that the VL was familiar with). The inquiries indicated that serial production could be started sometime in 1946, as there were other aircraft on queue, and there were difficulties in getting just about everything needed to produce a new aircraft. The new aircraft was also to be named "Vihuri".) Only a few airframes have survived, including one at the Central Finland Aviation Museum in Finland.

== History ==
In spite of their economic problems, the aircraft manufacturer Valmet began designing a new aircraft at the beginning of the 1950s, to replace the aging Finnish Air Force (FAF) VL Pyrys. Martti Vainio was the chief designer of the project. Most of the planning was made by the aeronautical engineers L. Hämäläinen and T. Mäntysalo in 1948–49. The Bristol Mercury, then being manufactured under license in Finland for the Bristol Blenheim bomber, was chosen as the engine, since it was readily available. The prototype (VH-1) made its first flight on 6 February 1951, in Tampere, piloted by captain Esko Halme. After successful test flights, the FAF ordered 30 production aircraft, called Valmet Vihuri II, on 27 February 1951. In the autumn of 1954, the Air Force ordered a further 20 aircraft of the developed version Valmet Vihuri III. All the aircraft of the third version were handed over to the Air Force on 15 January 1957.

Valmet built 51 Vihuris in three different models in Kuorevesi and Tampere. The aircraft had the registration codes VH-1 through VH-51.

== Operational use ==
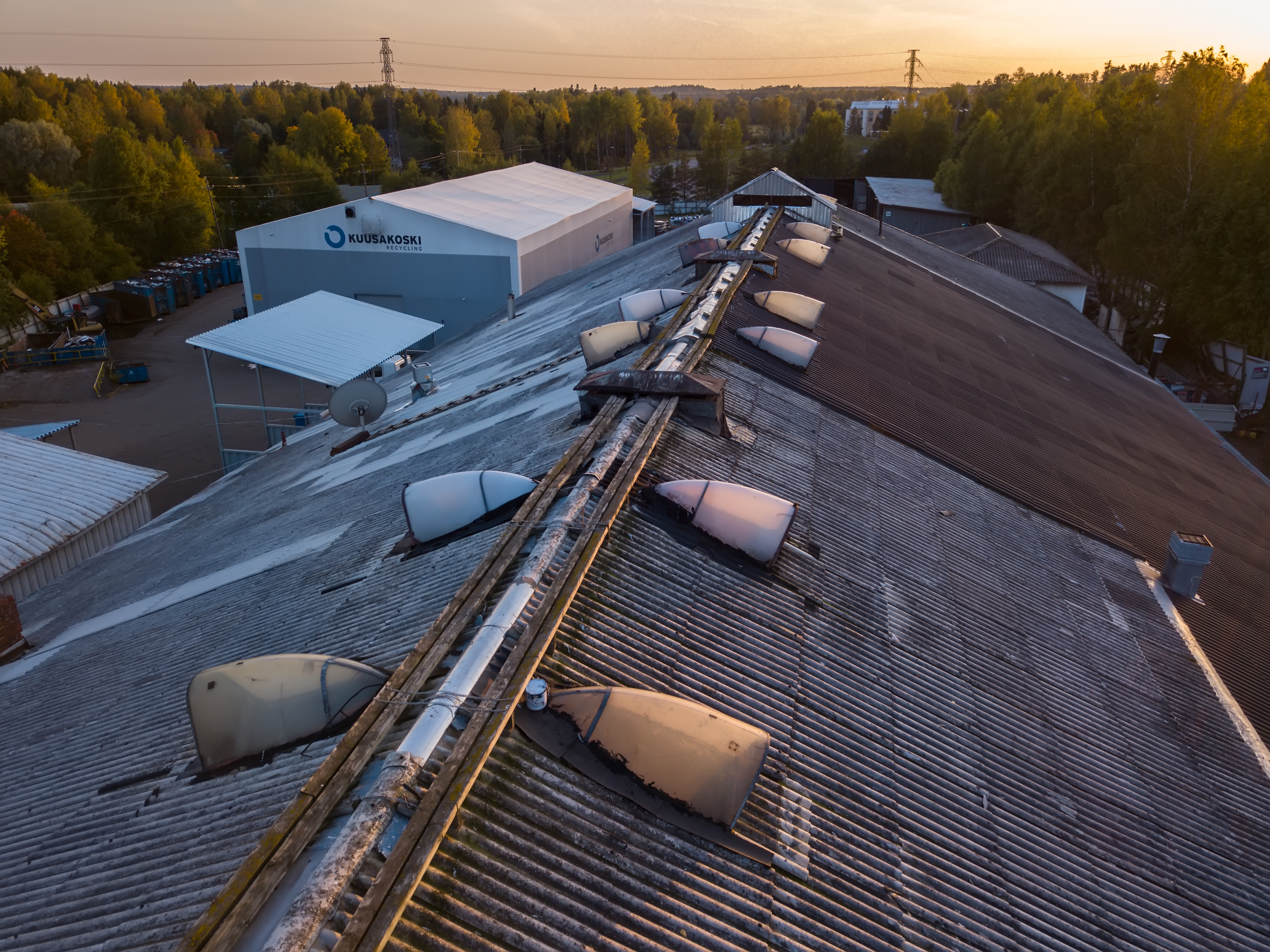
Vihuri canopies used as roof windows

The Vihuri aircraft became the most-used aircraft in FAF service by the mid-1950s. The aircraft was subject to many accidents, and the press raised much concern over this. The safety of the Vihuri even became a matter for the government. In May 1959, the aircraft was permanently grounded. Attempts were made to sell the aircraft to Tunisia, without success.

After inspection, it became apparent that the type and its design were sound; most of the accidents were due to pilots' often grave violations of flight regulations, and the fact that all airframes were well worn by the end of the 1950s. The other problem was the engines. The engines used, Tampella Mercury, were recycled engines of wartime Bristol Blenheim bombers which were already worn out. The planes were sold for scrap to Moser OY. One airframe, VH-18, survives in the Central Finland Aviation Museum, and the fore fuselage of another, VH-25, is being restored. The canopies of the scrapped aircraft remain today as the roof windows of the Kuusakoski metal-recycling plant in Espoo.

== Operators ==
Finland

- Finnish Air Force

== Surviving aircraft ==
The Central Finland Aviation museum is displaying the VH-18, which is the only preserved Vihuri. It gathered 802 flying hours, after which the aircraft served as an educational machine at the Air Force Academy in Kauhava.

== Specifications (Valmet Vihuri II) ==
Data from Jane's All The World's Aircraft 1956–57

General characteristics

- Crew: 2
- Length: 8.8 m (28 ft 10 in)
- Wingspan: 10.4 m (34 ft 1 in)
- Height: 3.86 m (12 ft 8 in)
- Wing area: 18.86 m^{2} (203.0 sq ft)
- Aspect ratio: 5.7:1
- Airfoil: NACA 0019-64 (root), NACA 23009 (tip)
- Gross weight: 2,678 kg (5,904 lb)
- Max takeoff weight: 2,884 kg (6,358 lb)
- Fuel capacity: 195 L (52 US gal; 43 imp gal) normal fuel, 260 L (69 US gal; 57 imp gal) auxiliary tanks
- Powerplant: 1 × Bristol Mercury VIII 9-cylinder air-cooled radial engine, 610 kW (820 hp)

Performance

- Maximum speed: 432 km/h (268 mph, 233 kn) at 3,700 m (12,100 ft)
- Cruise speed: 327 km/h (203 mph, 177 kn) at 1,000 m (3,300 ft) (econ. cruise)
- Service ceiling: 8,900 m (29,200 ft)
- Rate of climb: 11.50 m/s (2,263 ft/min)

Armament

- Guns: 2× 7.7 mm Browning machine guns
- Bombs: 4× 25 kg bombs

== See also ==
Aircraft of comparable role, configuration, and era

- Avro Athena
- Boulton Paul Balliol
- CAC Winjeel
- Fiat G.49
- I.Ae. 22 DL
- Macchi M.B.323
- Piaggio P.150
- Yakovlev Yak-11
