= Jan Heinonen =

Finnish footballer (born 2002)

Personal information
- Date of birth: 30 June 2002 (age 24)
- Place of birth: Finland
- Height: 1.83 m (6 ft 0 in)
- Position: Defensive midfielder

Youth career
- –2019: Inter Turku

Senior career*
Years	Team	Apps	(Gls)
2019–2022	Inter Turku II	30	(6)
2020–2022	Inter Turku	0	(0)
2021	→ KPV (loan)	24	(0)
2022	→ MP (loan)	14	(0)
2023–2024	MP	36	(2)
2025	SalPa	2	(0)
- * Club domestic league appearances and goals as of 12 September 2025

Jan Heinonen (born 30 June 2002) is a Finnish professional footballer who plays as a defensive midfielder.
