= Foligno Airport =

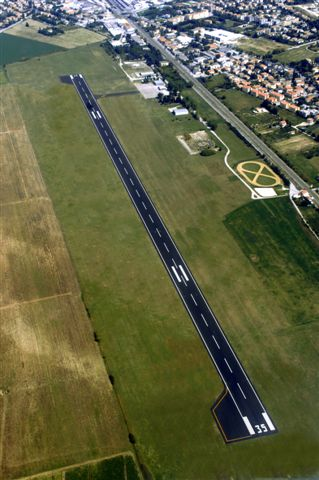
- IATA: none; ICAO: LIAF

Summary
- Airport type: Public
- Operator: ENAC
- Serves: Foligno, Umbria, Italy
- Elevation AMSL: 222 m / 728 ft
- Coordinates: 42°55′58″N 012°42′36″E

Map
- Location of the airport in Italy

Runways
Direction	Length		Surface
Direction	m	ft	Surface
17/35	1,660	5,446	Grooved Asphalt
17GLD/35GLD	1,100	3,609	Grass
- Sources: GCM,

Foligno Airport (ICAO: LIAF) is an airport serving the Italian city of Foligno in the Umbria region. It is used for general aviation, school, business jet aviation, charter aviation and cargo. It will be used as national base of Civil defense aviation.
Radio assistance available at 119.55 MHz.
