= Yakovlev Yak-11 =

Soviet military training aircraft

Yak-11
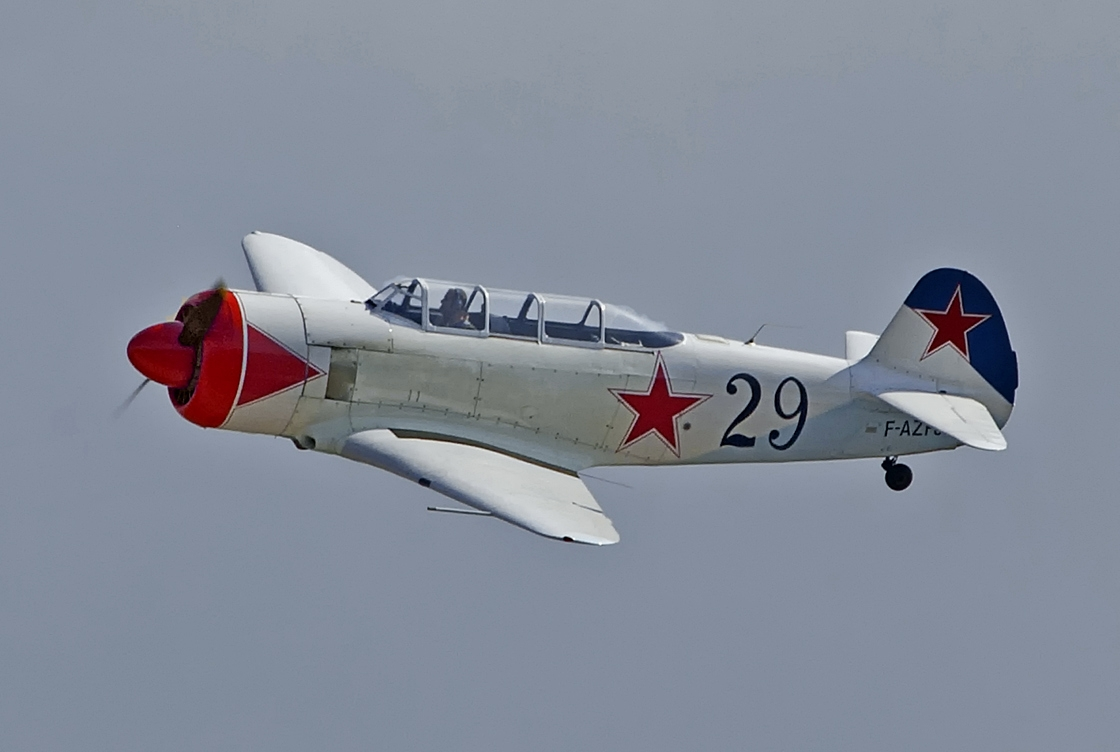
- Let C-11

General information
- Type: Training aircraft
- Manufacturer: Yakovlev, Let
- Primary user: Soviet Air Force
- Number built: 4,566

History
- Introduction date: 1946
- First flight: 10 November 1945
- Retired: 1962
- Developed from: Yakovlev Yak-3

The Yakovlev Yak-11 (Russian: Яковлев Як-11; NATO reporting name: "Moose") is a trainer aircraft used by the Soviet Air Force and other Soviet-influenced air forces from 1947 until 1962.

== Design and development ==
The Yakovlev design bureau began work on an advanced trainer based on the Yak-3 fighter in mid-1944, although the trainer was of low priority owing to the ongoing Second World War. The first prototype of the new trainer, designated Yak-UTI or Yak-3UTI flew in late 1945. It was based on the radial-powered Yak-3U, but with the new Shvetsov ASh-21 seven-cylinder radial replacing the ASh-82 of the Yak-3U. (Note: The single-row ASh-21 was essentially half of the two-row, 14-cylinder ASh-82.) It used the same all-metal wings as the Yak-3U, with a fuselage of mixed metal and wood construction. The pilot and observer sat in tandem under a long canopy with separate sliding hoods. A single synchronised UBS 12.7 mm machine gun and wing racks for two 100 kg (220 lb) bombs comprised the aircraft's armament.

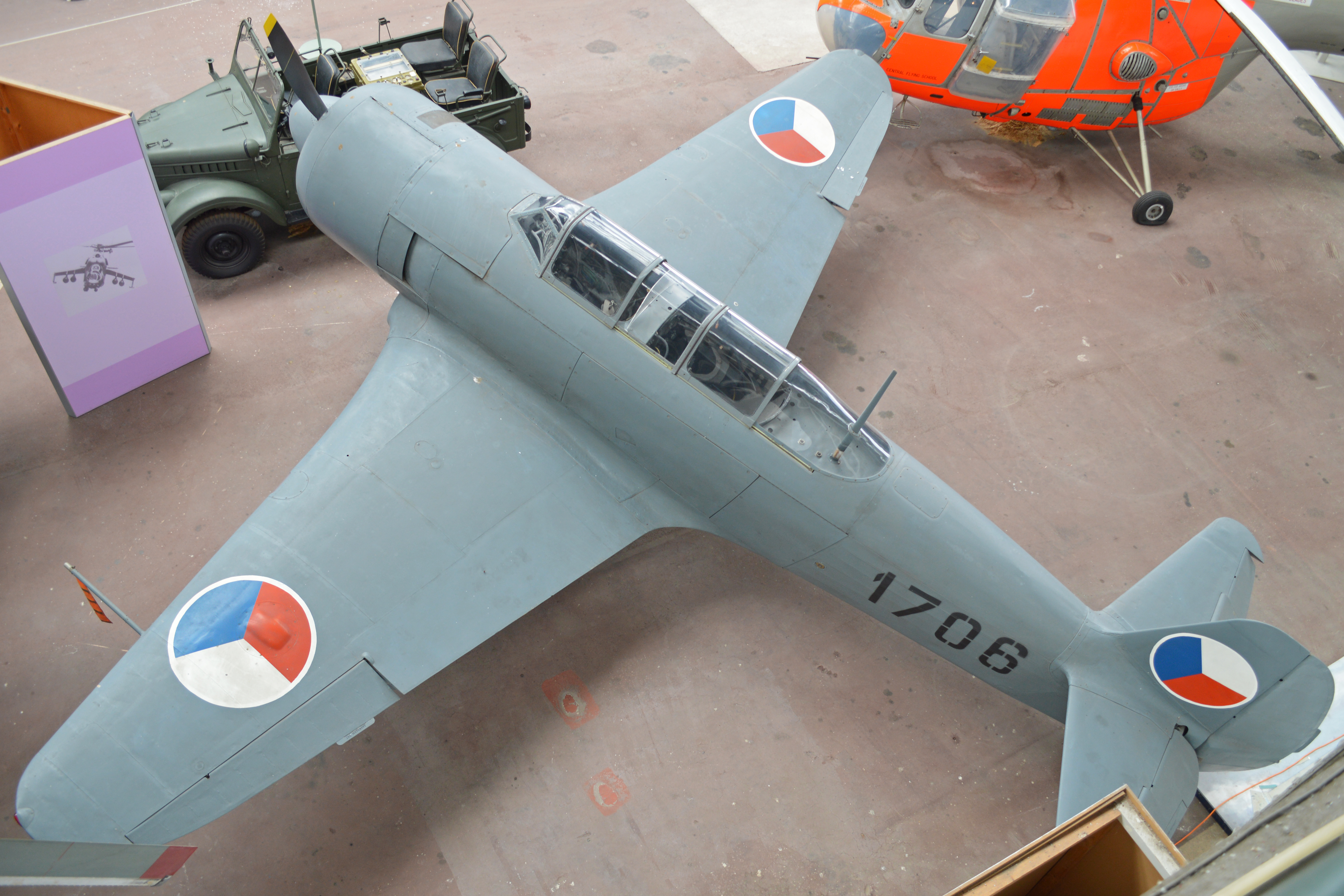
Let C-11

An improved prototype flew in 1946, with revised cockpits and a modified engine installation with the engine mounted on shock absorbing mounts. This aircraft passed state testing in October 1946, with production beginning at factories in Saratov and Leningrad in 1947.

Production Yak-11s were heavier than the prototypes, with later batches fitted with non-retractable tailwheels and revised propellers. A 7.62 mm ShKAS machine gun was sometimes fitted instead of the UBS, while some were fitted with rear-view periscopes above the windscreen. Soviet production totalled 3,859 aircraft between 1947 and 1955, with a further 707 licence-built by Let in Czechoslovakia as the C-11.

=== Yak-11U ===
In 1951, Yakovlev revised the design of the Yak-11, adding a retractable tricycle landing gear, with two variants proposed, the Yak-11U basic trainer and Yak-11T proficiency trainer, which carried equipment similar to contemporary jet fighters. The new aircraft had reduced fuel capacity and was unsuitable for operations on rough or snow-covered runways, and so was rejected for Soviet service, although a few units were built in Czechoslovakia as the C-11U.

== Operational history ==
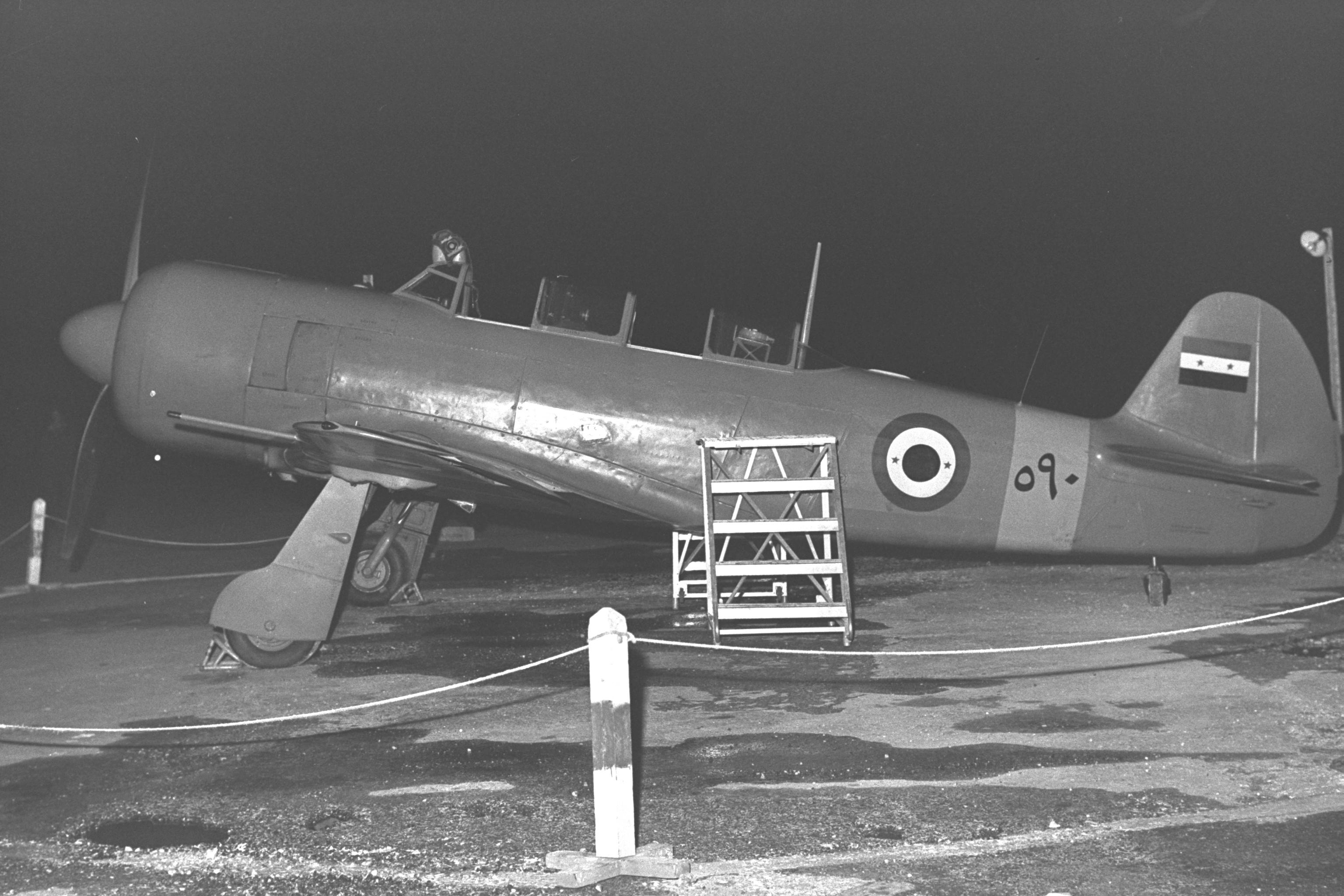
Egyptian Air Force Yak-11

The Yak-11 entered service in 1947, serving as a standard advanced trainer with the Soviet Air Forces and DOSAAF. Both the Yak-11 and C-11 were used in all Warsaw Pact countries and were exported to eighteen countries, including many African, Middle Eastern and Asian countries.

Egyptians used the aircraft extensively during their intervention in the North Yemen civil war. Egyptian aircraft were modified with Sakr 78mm unguided rockets and two .303in guns in the wings. and were used in the ground attack role.

North Korean Yak-11s were used in combat in the Korean War, with one Yak-11 being the first North Korean aircraft shot down by US forces when it was destroyed by a North American F-82 Twin Mustang over Kimpo Airfield on 27 June 1950. East Germany used the Yak-11 to intercept American reconnaissance balloons.

== Surviving aircraft ==
Heavily modified Yak-11 used for air racing

Due to its Yak-3 lineage, the Yak-11 has recently seen widespread popularity among warbird enthusiasts. Highly modified versions of the Yak-11 are often seen at air races. About 120 Yak-11s remain airworthy.

== Operators ==
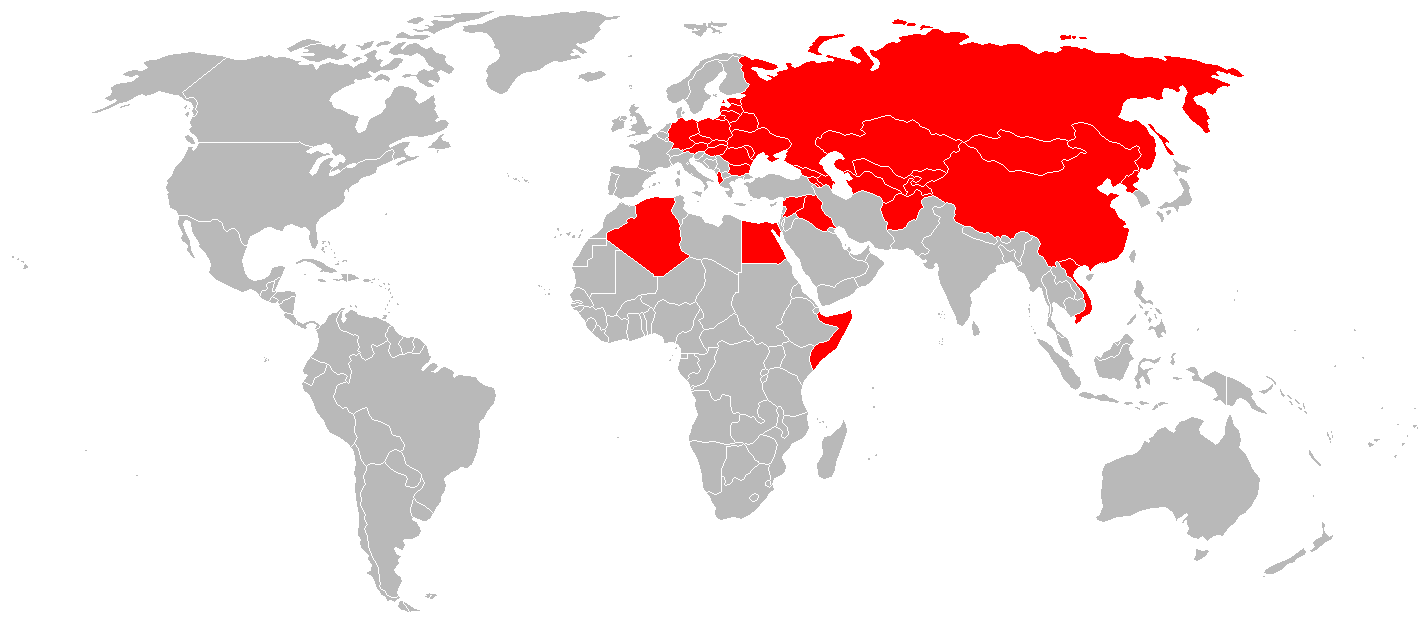
Yak-11 operators

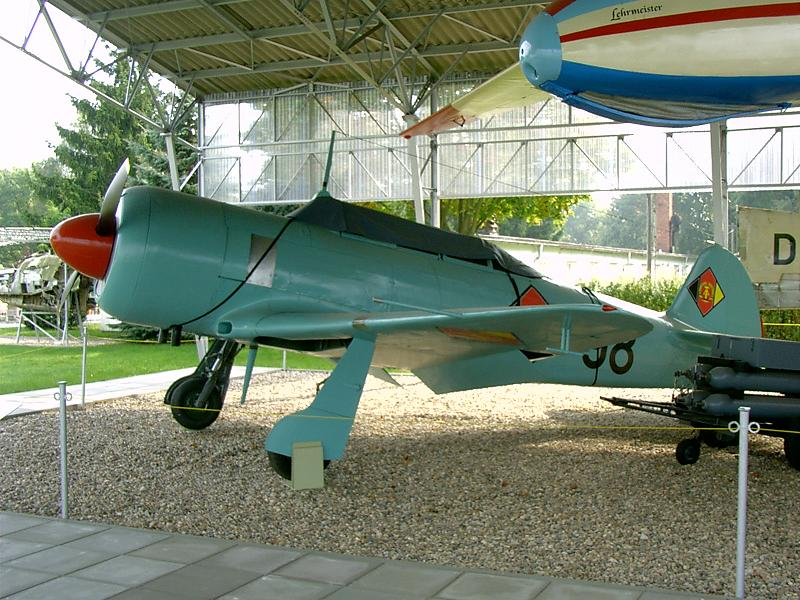
Fighter/trainer aircraft Yakovlev Yak-11 (National People's Army)

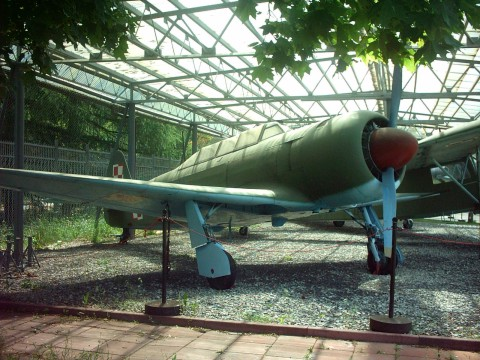
Preserved Yak-11 of the Polish Air Force

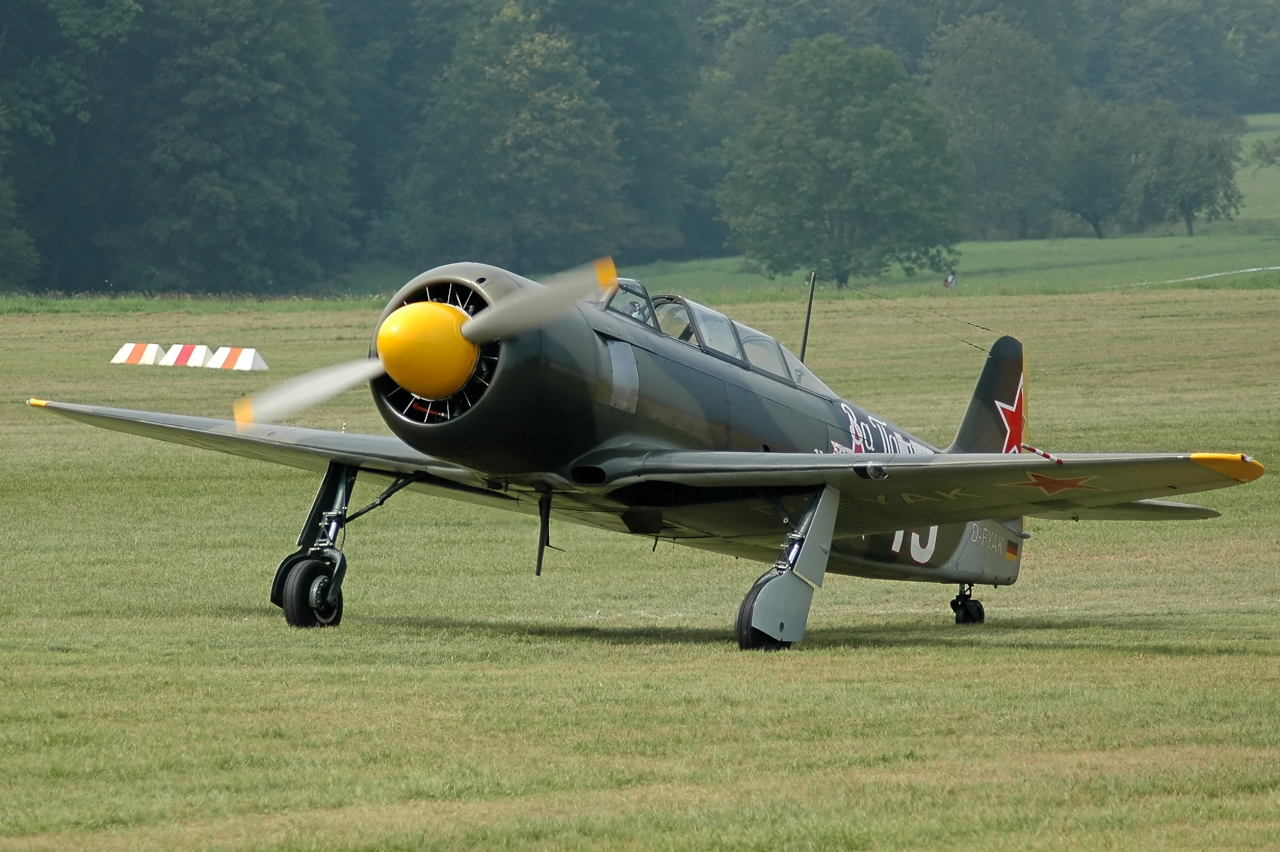
Yakovlev Yak-11 disguised in wartime fighter camouflage

Afghanistan

- Afghan Air Force − Received 12 in 1955. Operated an unknown number as late as 1981

Albania

- Albanian Air Force − Received 6 in 1953

Algeria

- Algerian Air Force − 12 ex-Egyptian aircraft delivered in 1964, possibly modernized in Czechoslovakia before delivery

Angola

- National Air Force of Angola

Austria

- Austrian Air Force − 4 donated by the Soviet Union in 1955

Bulgaria

- Bulgarian Air Force − 30 C-11 received in 1954

China

- People's Liberation Army Air Force − 50 delivered in 1950

Czechoslovakia

- Czechoslovak Air Force − 120, produced under license

East Germany

- East German Air Force

Egypt

- Egyptian Air Force

Iraq

- Iraqi Air Force

Hungary

- Hungarian Air Force

Mali

- Malian Air Force − 4, non-operational by 2011

Mongolia

- Mongolian People's Air Force

North Korea

- North Korean Air Force

Poland

- Polish Air Force − Received 40 in 1953

Romania

- Romanian Air Force − Received 20 between 1952 and 1953

Somalia

- Somali Air Corps − 20, non-operational by 1991

Soviet Union

- Soviet Air Force
- DOSAAF

Syria

- Syrian Air Force

Vietnam

- Vietnam People's Air Force

Yemen

- North Yemen Air Force − 30 donated by the Soviet Union between 1957 and 1958

== Specifications (Yak-11) ==
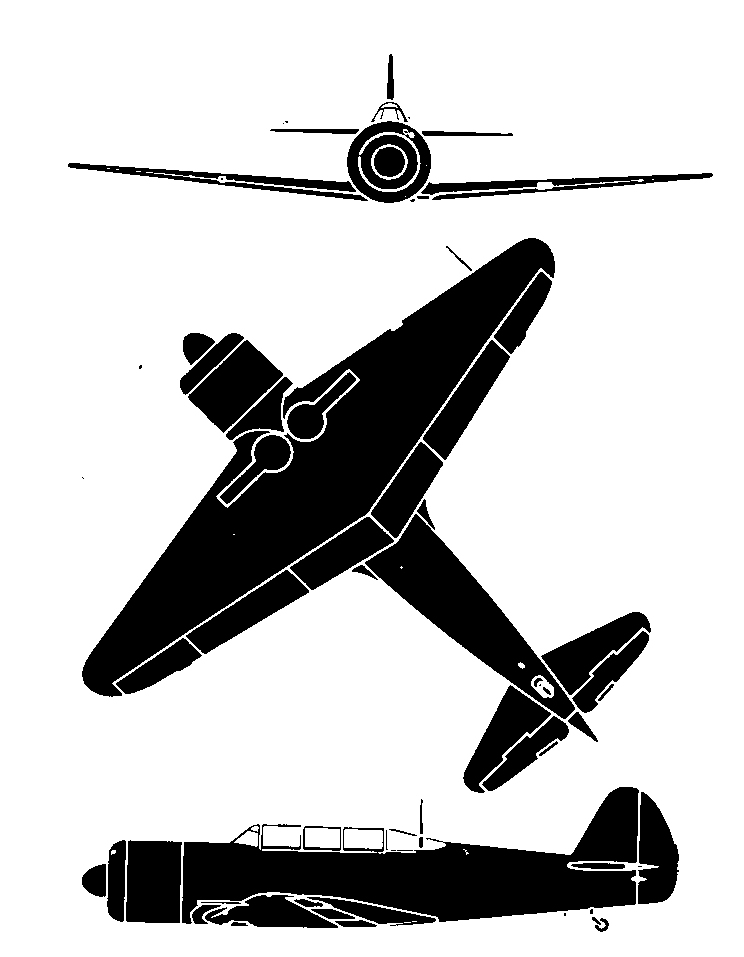

General characteristics

- Crew: two, student and instructor
- Length: 8.20 m (26 ft 10.5 in)
- Wingspan: 9.4 m (30 ft 10 in)
- Height: 3.28 m (10 ft 5 in)
- Wing area: 15.40 m^{2} (166 sq ft)
- Empty weight: 1,900 kg (4,189 lb)
- Max takeoff weight: 2,440 kg (5,379 lb)
- Powerplant: 1 × Shvetsov ASh-21 air-cooled radial piston engine, 521 kW (700 hp)

Performance

- Maximum speed: 460 km/h (289 mph, 248 kn)
- Cruise speed: 370 km/h (230 mph, 200 kn)
- Range: 1,250 km (795 mi, 691 nmi)
- Service ceiling: 7,100 m (23,295 ft)
- Rate of climb: 8.1 m/s (1,600 ft/min)
- Wing loading: 161 kg/m^{2} (32.9 lb/sq ft)
- Power/mass: 0.17 kW/kg (0.10 hp/lb)

Armament

- 1x nose-mounted machine gun, either 12.7 mm UBS or 7.62 mm ShKAS
- up to 200 kg (440 lb) of bombs on two underwing racks

== See also ==
Related development

- Yakovlev Yak-3

Aircraft of comparable role, configuration, and era

- Boulton Paul Balliol
- Fiat G.49
- North American T-6 Texan
- PZL TS-8 Bies
- Soko 522
- Valmet Vihuri
