= Aarre Heinonen =

Finnish artist, teacher and professor

Aarre Heinonen (July 31, 1906, in Lahti – January 28, 2003, in Helsinki) was a Finnish artist, teacher and professor.
