= CAC Winjeel =

1955 Australian trainer aircraft

Winjeel
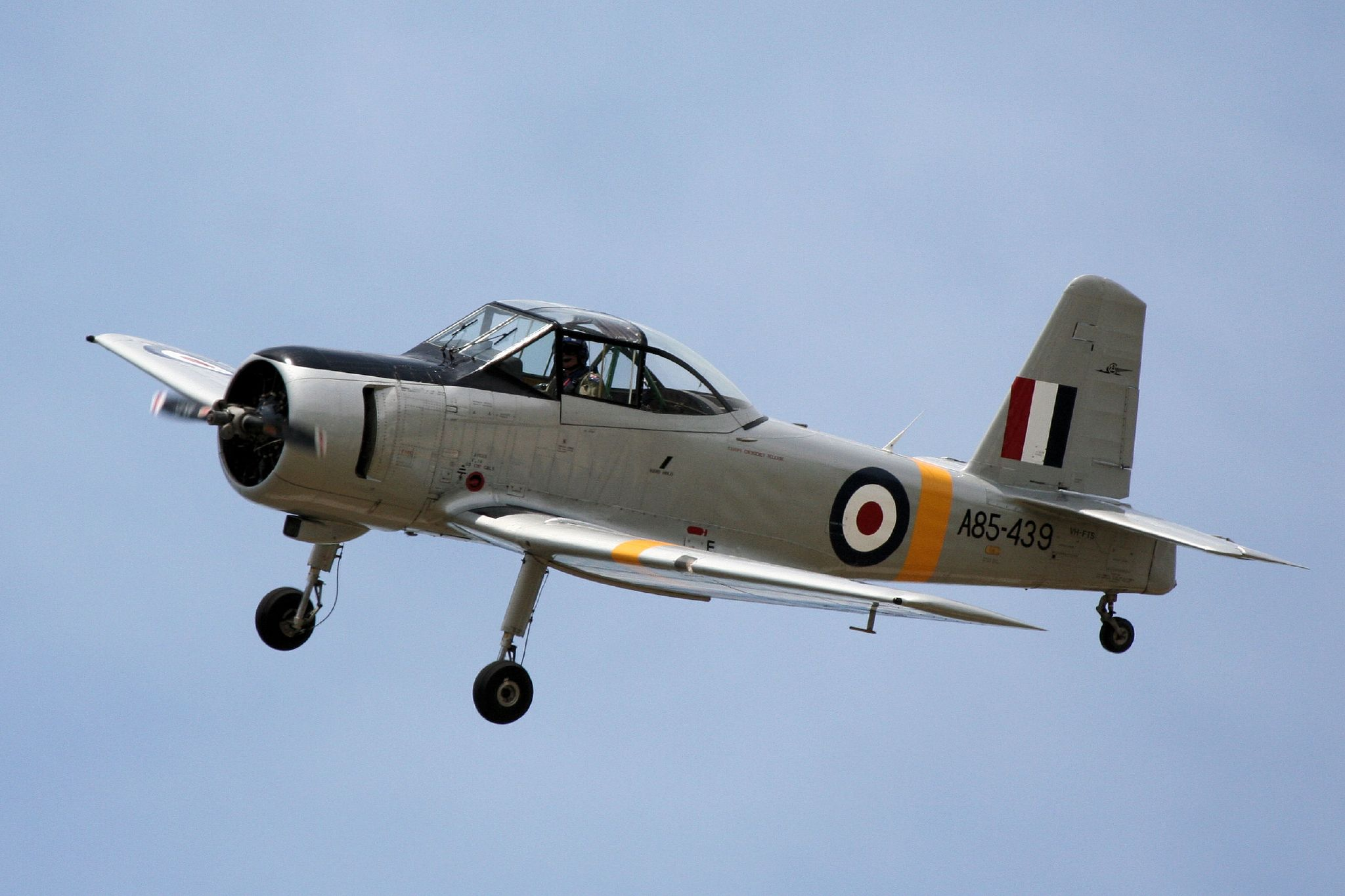
- CA25-39 Winjeel A85-439 at the RAAF Museum

General information
- Type: Trainer aircraft
- National origin: Australia
- Manufacturer: Commonwealth Aircraft Corporation
- Status: One retained by the Royal Australian Air Force as a heritage display aircraft. Some examples now privately owned or in museums.
- Primary user: Royal Australian Air Force
- Number built: 2 (CA-22); 62 (CA-25)

History
- Introduction date: 1955
- First flight: 23 February 1955
- Retired: 1995

The CAC CA-25 Winjeel is an Australian-designed and manufactured three-seat training aircraft. Entering service with the Royal Australian Air Force (RAAF) in 1955 as a basic to advanced trainer, it served in this role until 1975. Later, it was used in the Forward Air Control (FAC) role for target marking until 1994, after which it was retired from RAAF service.

== Design and development ==
The Winjeel (from a Victorian indigenous word for "young eagle", an alternate spelling of Bunjil) was developed by the Commonwealth Aircraft Corporation at Fishermans Bend in Victoria to satisfy RAAF technical requirement No.AC.77 issued in 1948. Designed to replace both the Tiger Moth and the CAC Wirraway, the first two prototype CA-22 aircraft were flown in February 1951. However, it proved a very stable aircraft making it almost impossible to spin, and with this being a required part of pilot training the tail had to be redesigned as a result. Sixty-two production CA-25 aircraft were subsequently built and given the fleet serials A85-401 to A85-462.

== Operational history ==
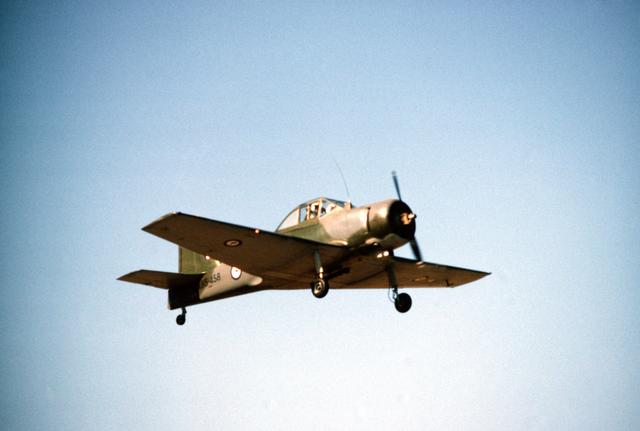
CA25-58 Winjeel A85-458 in Forward Air Control role, 1980

The first aircraft flew in February 1955, and deliveries began that September. The first Winjeel entered service with No. 1 Basic Flying Training School (1 BFTS) at Uranquinty, near Wagga Wagga, New South Wales. The last aircraft was delivered in August 1957. For most of its service life, the Winjeel was used as a basic trainer at RAAF Base Point Cook in Victoria, after 1 BFTS was transferred there in 1958. The Winjeel remained in service with the RAAF as a basic trainer until 1968, when the Macchi MB-326 replaced it in this role as part of the RAAF's adoption of an "all through" jet training concept. The failure of this concept ultimately ensured that the Winjeel was retained in the training role until 1975, when it was replaced by the New Zealand-built PAC CT/4A Airtrainer.

After this, a few Winjeels were used in the Forward Air Control (FAC) role. Initially operated by No. 4 Flight, they were equipped with smoke bombs for target marking. By 1994 there were 4 in service with No. 76 Squadron based at RAAF Base Williamtown, but later that year they were replaced by the Pilatus PC-9 and subsequently retired.

== Surviving examples ==
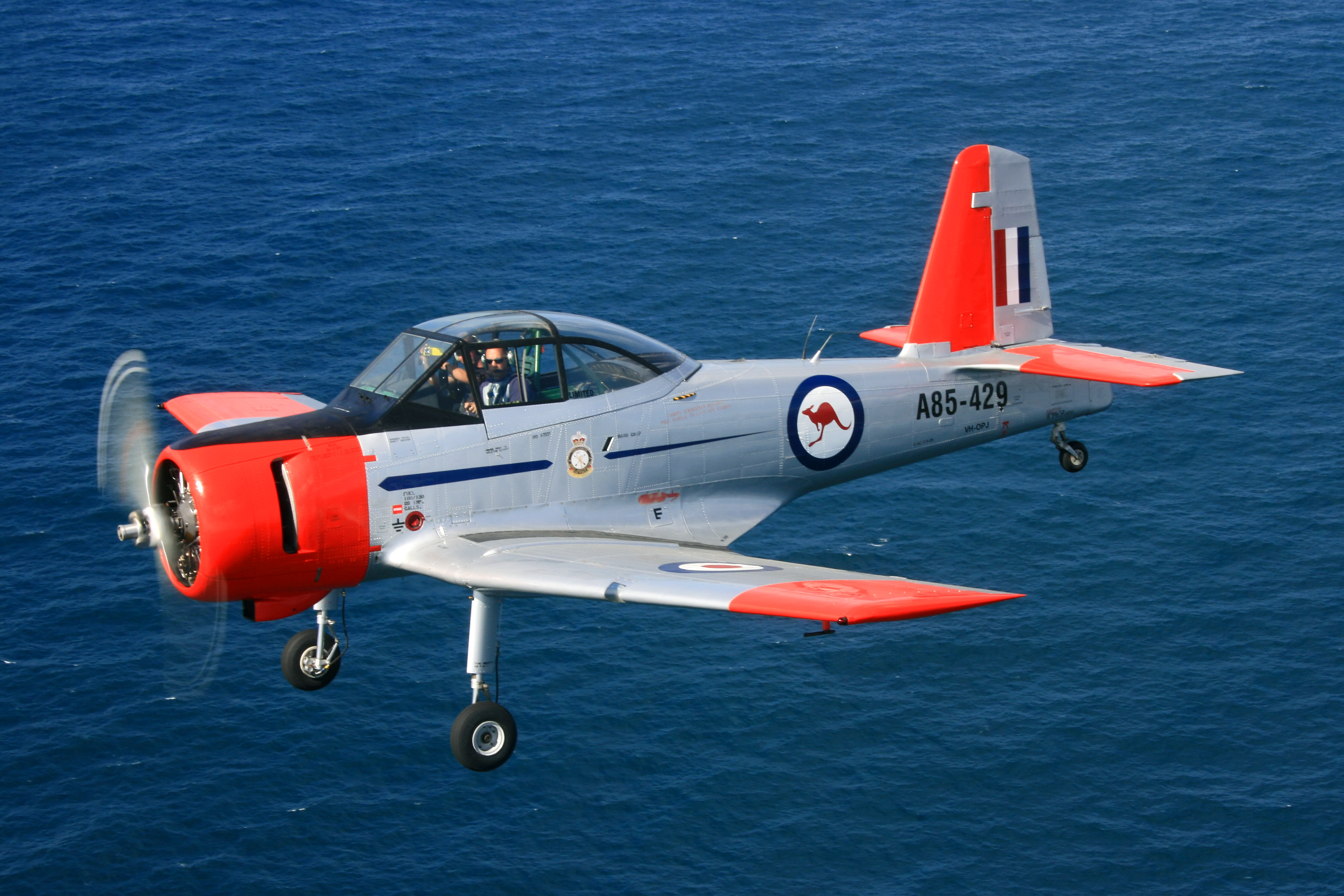
Winjeel A85-429/VH-OPJ over the Pacific Ocean off Ballina in 2011.

Airworthy

- A85-429 - Classic Aero Adventure Flights, Ballina Byron Gateway Airport. Civil registered VH-OPJ.
- A85-435 - Historical Aircraft Restoration Society, Shellharbour Airport. Civil registered VH-EAD.
- A85-439 - RAAF Museum, operated by No. 100 Squadron RAAF. Also civil registered VH-FTS.
- A85-443 - Benalla Aviation Museum, Benalla Airport. Civil registered VH-CZE.
- A85-453 - Warbird Adventures Aviation Museum, Mareeba Airfield. Civil registered VH-XXE.
- 24 airworthy examples are privately owned, 23 in Australia and one in New Zealand.

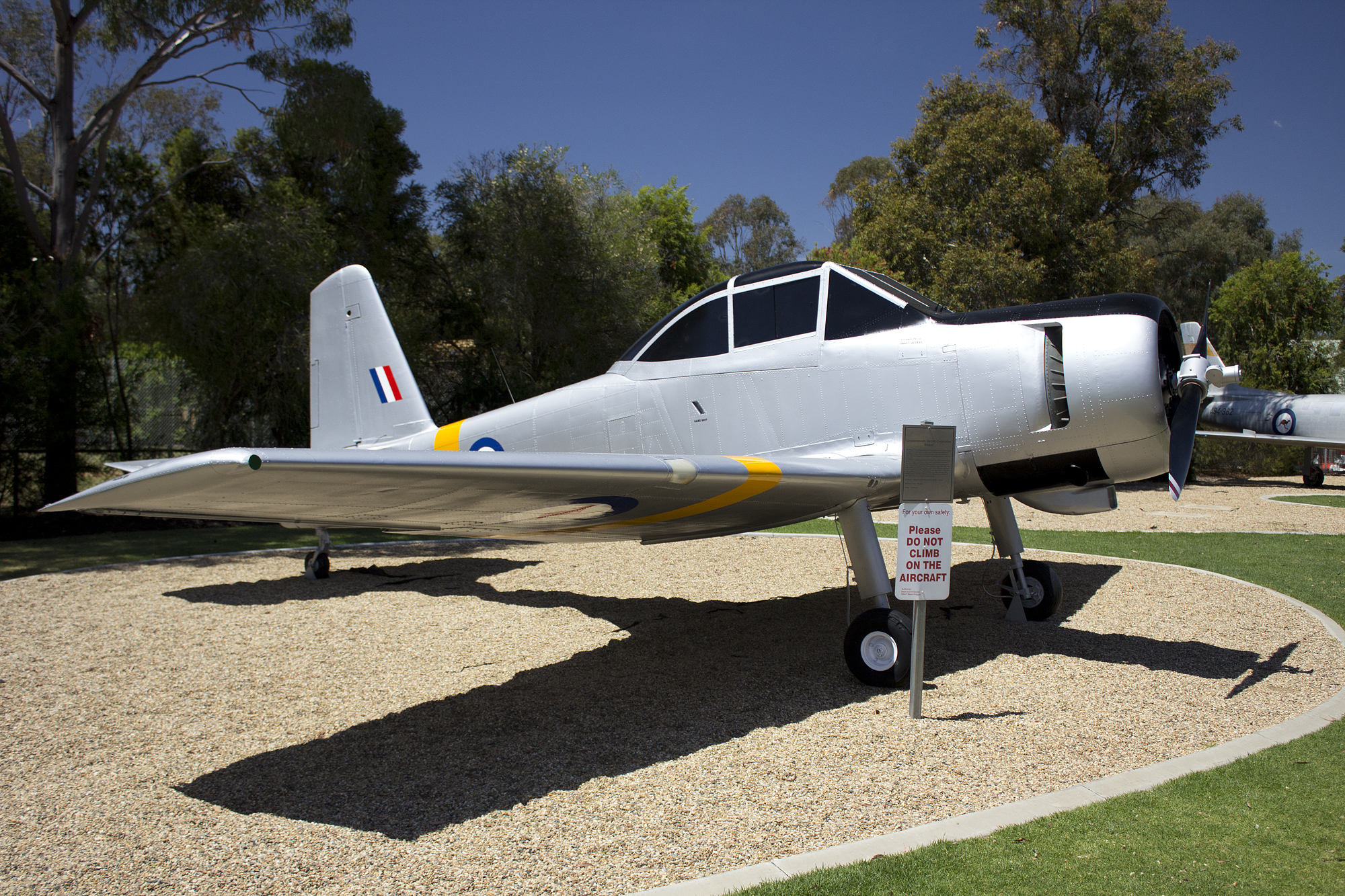
CAC Winjeel CA25-03 A85-403 - RAAF Base Wagga, June 2008

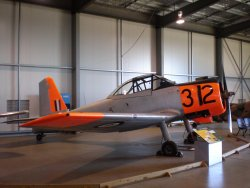
CA25-32 Winjeel, A85-432, Army Aviation Museum, Oakey, 2007

Static (on display unless otherwise noted)

- A85-364 - RAAF Museum, relocated to the RAAF Wagga Heritage Centre in 2020.
- A85-401 - RAAF Museum.
- A85-403 - RAAF Wagga Heritage Centre.
- A85-405 - gate guard at RAAF Base East Sale.
- A85-406 - RAAF Base Amberley Aviation Heritage Centre, under restoration.
- A85-410 - Queensland Air Museum.
- A85-418 - Australian National Aviation Museum.
- A85-428 - Fighter World.
- A85-431 - RAAF Wagga Heritage Centre, former training aid, in storage.
- A85-432 - Oakey Army Aviation Centre.
- A85-441 - Australian War Memorial, in storage.
- A85-449 - RAAF Base Amberley Aviation Heritage Centre, under restoration.
- A85-456 - RAAF Museum, in storage.
- A85-618 - RAAF Museum, in storage.
- Five others are privately owned, three being restored to flying condition and two in storage.

== Variants ==
- CA-22 Winjeel : Prototypes. Only two aircraft were built.
- CA-25 Winjeel : Two-seat basic trainer aircraft for the RAAF. 62 aircraft were built.

== Operators ==
Australia

- Royal Australian Air Force (RAAF)

== Specifications ==
Data from Jane's All The World's Aircraft 1955–56

General characteristics

- Crew: 2
- Capacity: provision for third seat
- Length: 28 ft 0 1/2 in (8.547 m)
- Wingspan: 38 ft 7 1/2 in (11.773 m)
- Height: 9 ft 1 in (2.77 m)
- Wing area: 249 sq ft (23.1 m^{2})
- Aspect ratio: 6.0:1
- Airfoil: NACA 23015 at root, NACA 23010 at tip
- Empty weight: 3,289 lb (1,492 kg)
- Gross weight: 4,265 lb (1,935 kg)
- Fuel capacity: 69 imp gal (83 US gal; 310 L) normal
- Powerplant: 1 × Pratt & Whitney R-985-AN-2 Wasp Junior nine-cylinder radial engine, 445 hp (332 kW)

Performance

- Maximum speed: 186 mph (299 km/h, 162 kn)
- Cruise speed: 165 mph (266 km/h, 143 kn) at 8,500 ft (2,600 m)
- Endurance: 3.5 hr at 158 mph (254 km/h; 137 kn) and 5,000 ft (1,500 m)
- Service ceiling: 18,000 ft (5,500 m)
- Rate of climb: 1,500 ft/min (7.6 m/s)
- Time to altitude: 10 min to 10,000 ft (3,000 m)
- Take-off run to 50 ft (15 m): 1,110 ft (340 m) (standard temperature)
- Landing run from 50 ft (15 m): 1,000 ft (305 m)

== See also ==
Aircraft of comparable role, configuration, and era

- Percival Provost
- Valmet Vihuri

Related lists

- List of aircraft of the Royal Australian Air Force
