= Training Air Wing =

- Active: 1918-2015
- Country: Finland
- Branch: Finnish Air Force
- Role: Pilot training on jet aircraft
- March: Sotamarssi
- Engagements: Winter War, Continuation War, Lapland War
- Decorations: Cross of Liberty, 1st Class (awarded 1988)

Insignia
- Distinctive unit insignia

The Training Air Wing (Finnish: Lentosotakoulu, abbr. LentoSK, Swedish: Flygkrigsskolan) was the Finnish Air Force pilot jet aircraft training school. It was located at Kauhava Airport in Kauhava, in Southern Ostrobothnia. The unit trained pilots for the Finnish Defence Forces, as well as for the Finnish Border Guard.

== History ==
In the beginning, pilots were trained in Helsinki at Santahamina, where there was a sandy airfield, called "Sahara". Until the end of the 1920s, the school mostly used aircraft equipped with floaters. In the 1930s, the pilot training was moved to Kauhava. At the same time, the Finnish Air Force also started to train pilots for the reserve.

In 2005, it was decided that primary training would be branched off and a new unit was created in Tikkakoski. It was named into Air Force Academy. Because the name of Kauhava unit had been the same, it was renamed the Training Air Wing—the same name unit had already in 1941-1952.

The pilot training started with a conscript course at the Air Force Academy in Tikkakoski, now a part of Jyväskylä, where initial training was given with the Vinka aircraft. Training was handled by Patria Aviation. Upon completing initial training, some pilots were transferred to the Training Air Wing at Kauhava, where they began jet training with Hawk aircraft.

In 2014, as a part of a wider reform in the defence forces, the school at Kauhava was disbanded, and the functions were taken over by the Air Force Academy (Ilmasotakoulu) in Tikkakoski.

== After the termination ==
The Training Air Wing had to hand over the real estate to the Ministry of Defence in 2015. Part of the staff could be employed in Tikkakoski. Other staff with more than 12 years of service were eligible for a year of pay as a termination bonus.

In early summer 2014, the real estate was sold to a company called LSK Business Park, founded by entrepreneurs from the region.

In fall 2015, an asylum seeker processing center with 350 beds, operated by the Finnish Red Cross, began operations in the former spaces of the Wing.
