= Air base =

Aerodrome used by a military force for the operation of military aircraft

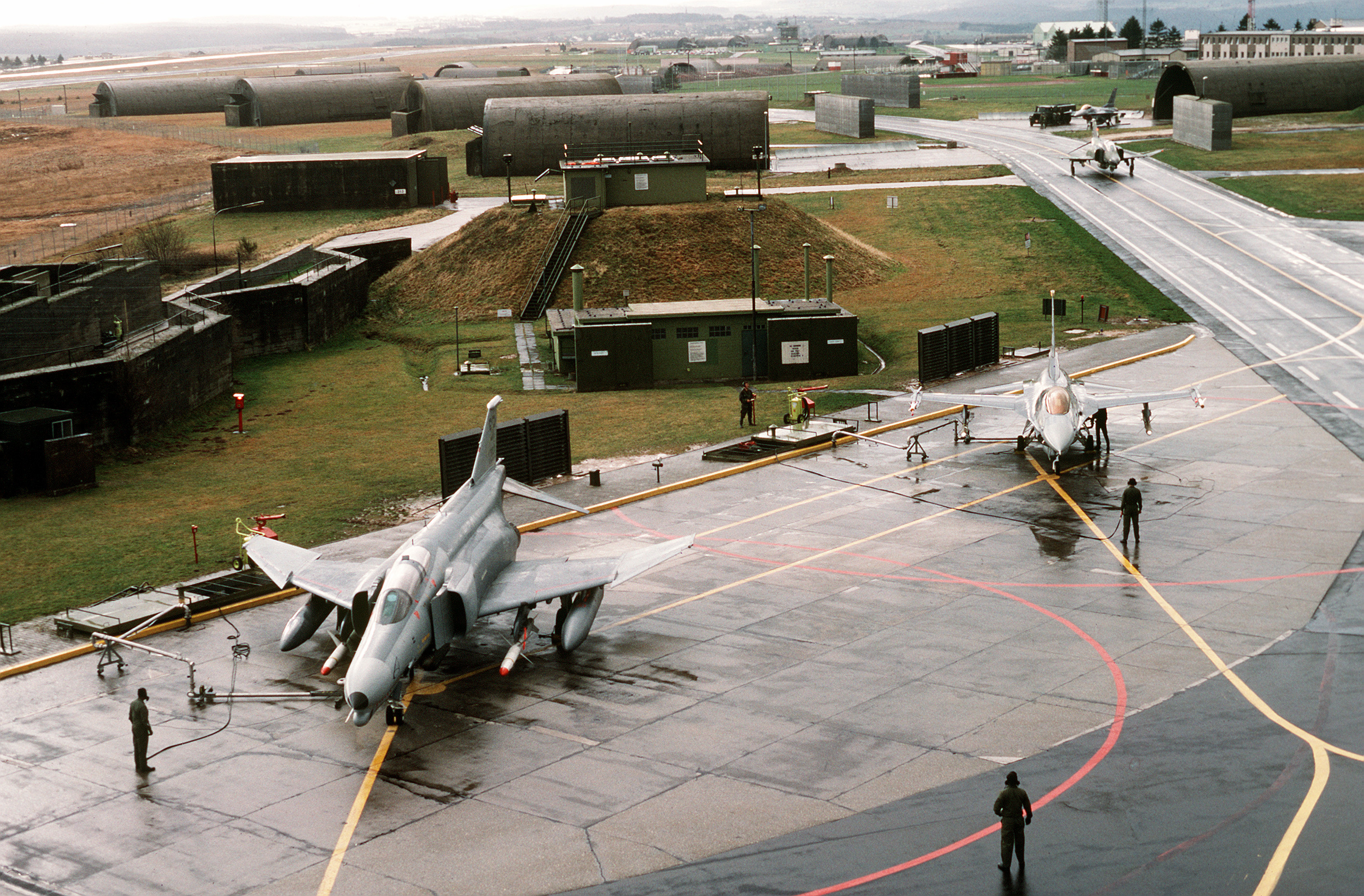
F-4G Phantom II and F-16 at Spangdahlem Air Base, Germany in 1990.

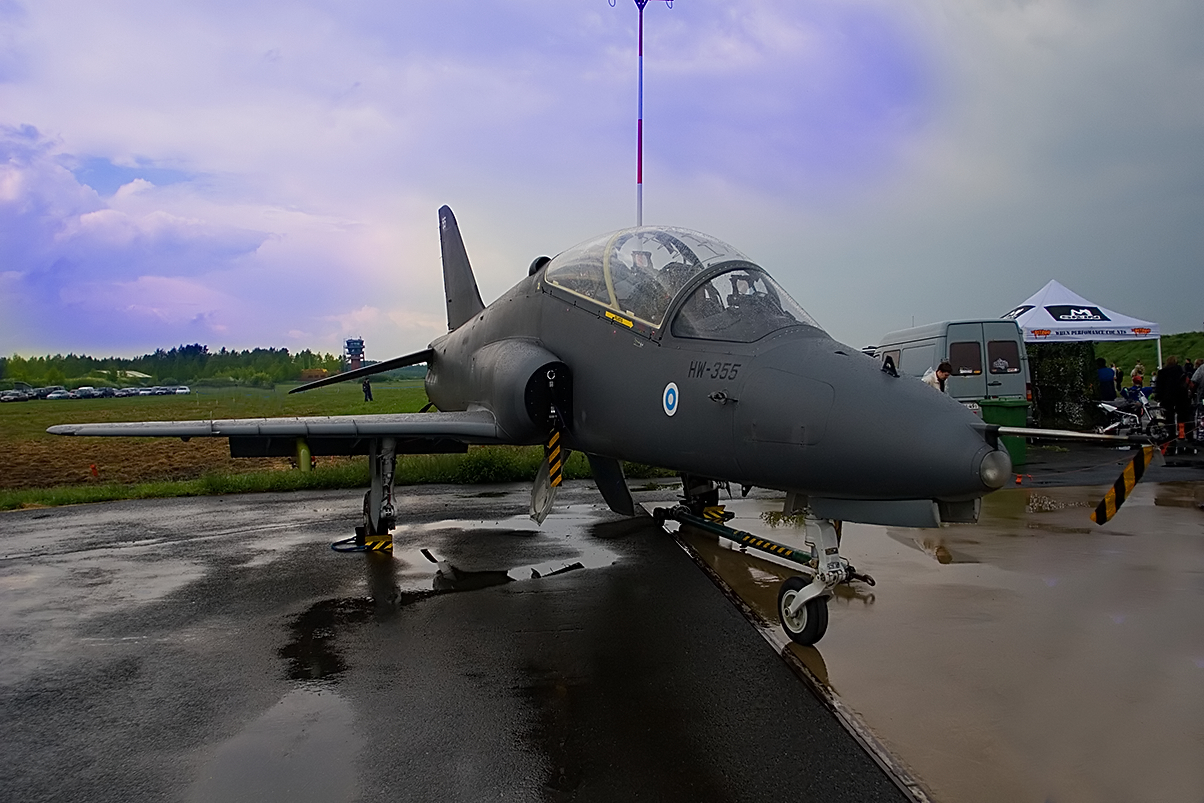
A Finnish Airforce BAe Hawk Mk51A fighter (HW-355) at Kauhava Airport in Kauhava, Finland in 2008.

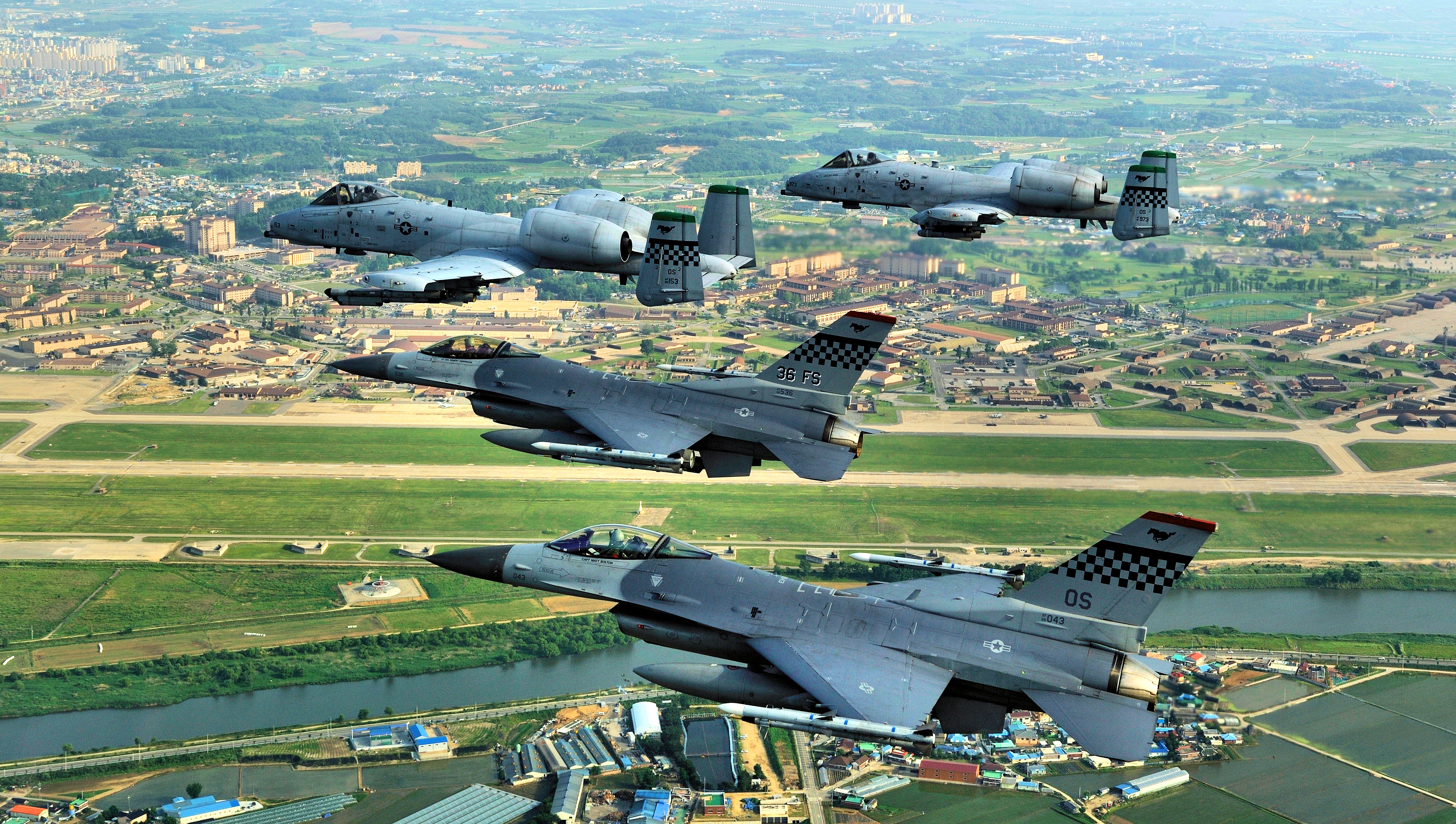
Osan Air Base, an airbase shared by United States Air Force and Republic of Korea Air Force in South Korea.

An airbase or air base, sometimes referred to as a military airbase, military airfield, military airport, air station, naval air station, air force station, or air force base, is an aerodrome or airport used as a military base by a military force for operating military aircraft.

== Airbase facilities ==
An airbase typically has some facilities similar to a civilian airport; for example, air traffic control and firefighting. Some military aerodromes have passenger facilities; for example, RAF Brize Norton in England has a terminal used by passengers for the Royal Air Force's passenger transport flights. A number of military airbases may also have a civil enclave for commercial passenger flights, e.g. Beijing Nanyuan Airport (China), Chandigarh Airport (India), Ibaraki Airport (Japan), Burlington International Airport (USA), Sheikh Ul-Alam International Airport Srinagar (India), Taipei Songshan Airport (Taiwan), and Eindhoven airport (The Netherlands). Likewise, the opposite also occurs; large civilian airports may contain a smaller military airbase within their environs, such as Royal Brunei Air Force Base, Rimba (located within Brunei International Airport).

Some airbases have dispersed aircraft parking, revetments, hardened aircraft shelters, or even underground hangars, to protect aircraft from enemy attack. Combat aircraft requires secure protected storage of aircraft ordnance and munitions. Other facilities may also include technical buildings for servicing and support of survival equipment (including flying helmets and personal liquid oxygen), flight simulator for synthetic training, servicing facilities for all aircraft systems (airframes, propulsion, avionics, weapons systems) and associated ground support systems (including mechanical transport). All military airbases will have buildings for military administration (station headquarters, squadron briefing and operations), and larger bases will also include medical and dental facilities for military personnel (and sometimes their dependents), along with dining (mess, informally known as the 'cook house'), accommodation (single living accommodation for junior ranks, Sergeants' and Officers' Mess for senior non-commissioned officers and commissioned officers), recreational facilities (club house for socialising), shopping facilities (NAAFI shops, base exchange, commissary), and sports facilities (gymnasium, swimming pool, sports pitches). An airbase may be defended by anti-aircraft weapons and force protection troops.

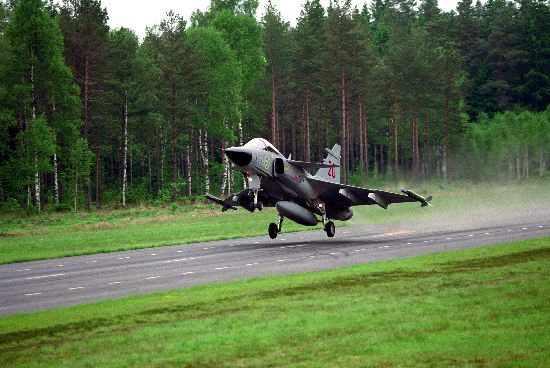
A JAS 39 Gripen of the Swedish Air Force taking off from a road runway, as part of a dispersal airbase.

== Dispersal airbase ==
A dispersal (or dispersed) airbase is an airfield that is used for the purpose of dispersing air units in the event of conflict, so as to minimise the vulnerability of aircraft and its supporting units whilst on the ground. Dispersal airbases are not necessarily ordinarily operational in peace time, and may only be activated when needed. Airfields used as dispersal bases can either be auxiliary military airfields, civilian airports, or highway strips. Examples of uses of dispersal bases are the Swedish Bas 60 and Bas 90 systems, the British V-Bomber dispersal bases, and NATO's Dispersed Operating Bases in France.

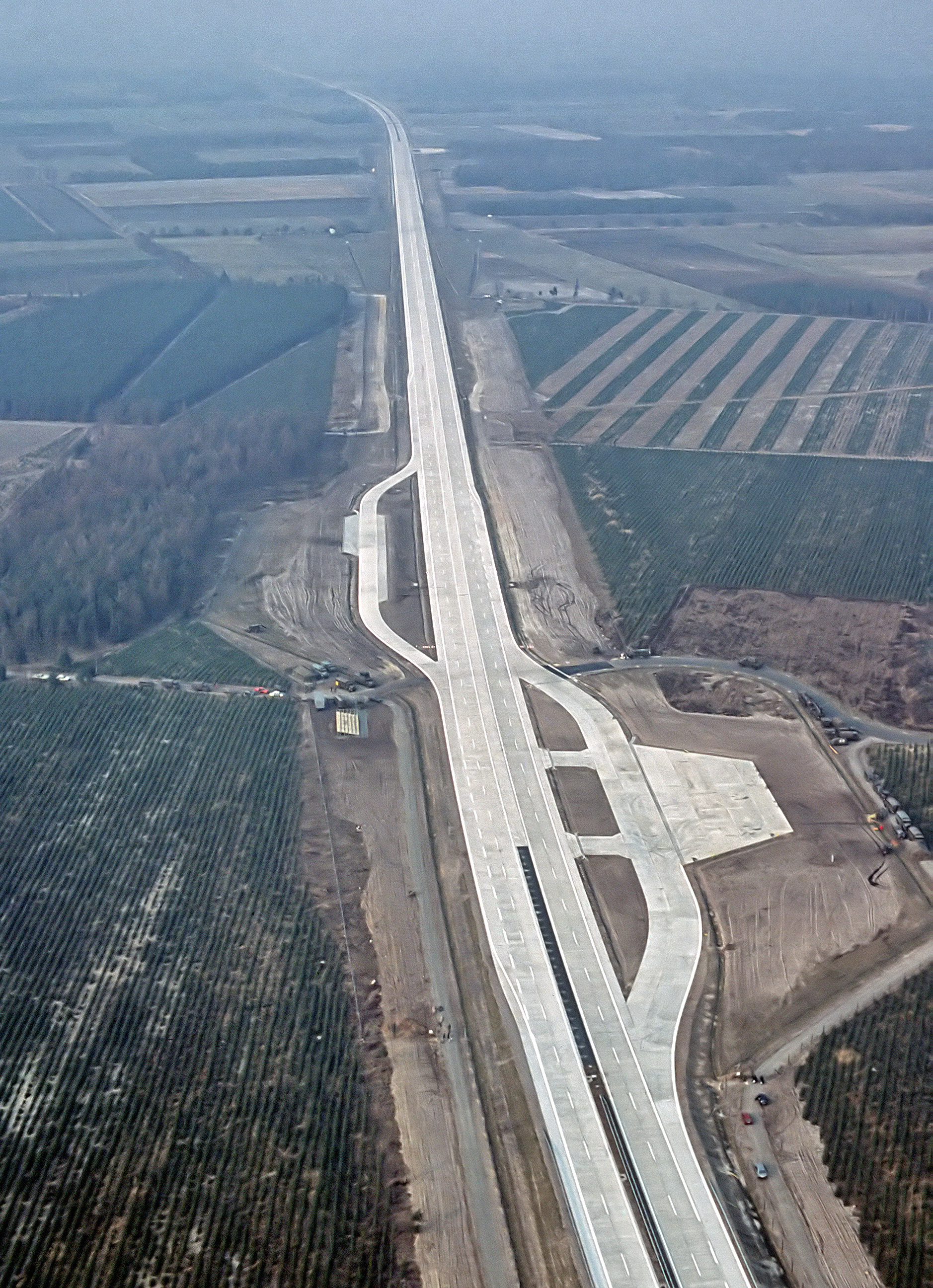
Highway strip on the Autobahn A29 near Ahlhorn

== Road airbase ==
Road airbases are highways constructed to double as auxiliary airbases in the event of war. Countries known to utilise this strategy are India, Sweden, Finland, Germany (formerly), Singapore, Switzerland, South Korea, Turkey, Poland, Pakistan, and the Czech Republic. In the case of Finnish road airbases, the space needed for landing aircraft is reduced by means of an arrestor wire, similar to that used on some aircraft carriers (Finnish Air Force uses F/A-18s, which were originally designed to land on aircraft carriers).

== Aircraft carrier ==
An aircraft carrier is a type of naval ship which serves as a seaborne airbase, the development of which has greatly enhanced the range and capabilities of modern air forces and naval aviation. In many countries, they are now a key part of the military, allowing for their military aircraft to be staged much nearer the area of conflict. Aircraft carriers were vital to the United States during World War II, Korea and the Vietnam War, and to the United Kingdom in the 1982 Falklands War. They retain modern roles as well as "several acres of sovereign territory a nation can move about at will", which allows greater flexibility in diplomacy as well as military affairs. Aircraft carriers may also used in disaster relief.

== See also ==
- List of Royal Air Force stations
- List of Royal Australian Air Force installations
- List of Royal Canadian Air Force stations
- List of United States Air Force installations
- List of Soviet Air Force bases
- Naming of military air bases
- Satellite airfield
- Naval base
- Submarine base
- Air Base 200 Apt–Saint-Christol
