= Valmet L-70 Vinka =

Finnish trainer aircraft

L-70 Vinka
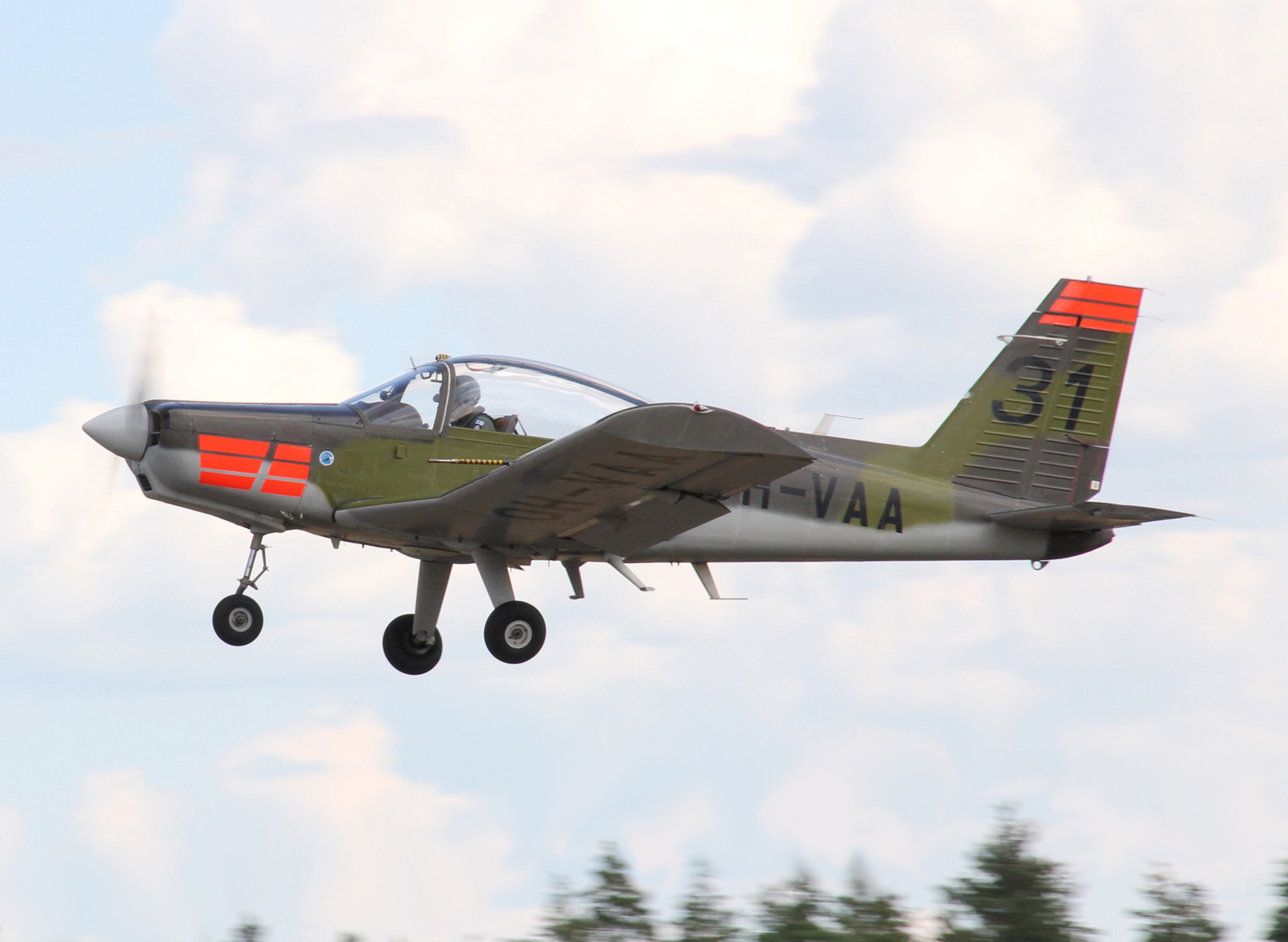
- A Valmet L-70 taking off from Oripää Airfield

General information
- Type: Trainer aircraft
- Manufacturer: Valmet
- Status: Retired
- Primary user: Finnish Air Force (historical)
- Number built: 30

History
- Introduction date: 1980
- First flight: 1 July 1975
- Retired: 2022
- Variant: Valmet L-80 Turbo-Vinha
- Developed into: Valmet L-90 Redigo

The Valmet L-70 Vinka is a Finnish-designed piston-powered military basic trainer aircraft of the 1970s. A production run of 30 aircraft were built for the Finnish Air Force in the early 1980s, and although the type was not exported, it formed the basis of the turboprop-powered Aermacchi M-290 RediGO.

== Development and design ==
The Finnish state-owned manufacturing conglomerate Valmet Oy began design work in September 1970 on a replacement for the Saab Safirs then in use with the Finnish Air Force as basic trainers. Valmet received an order from the Finnish Air Force for further development of the LEKO-70 (Lentokone (Aeroplane) 1970) in March 1973. The first prototype made its maiden flight from Halli Airport for the first time on 1 July 1975.

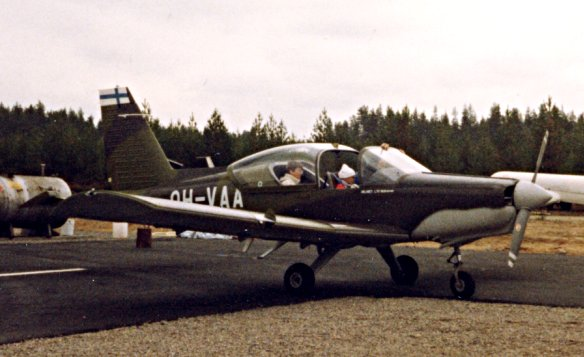
Valmet L-70 Miltrainer at Teisko Airfield in Tampere, 1983

The aircraft is a low-winged tractor monoplane of all-metal construction and with a fixed nosewheel undercarriage. It is powered by a single 200 hp (149 kW) Lycoming O-360 flat-four piston engine driving a two-bladed propeller. In its main training role, the pupil and instructor sit side by side under a large sliding canopy. An additional two seats or a stretcher and medical attendant can be carried for the liaison role, while the wings are fitted with four hardpoints for carrying of external stores.

The Finnish Air Force placed an order for 30 aircraft, to be designated Vinka (Blast (of wind)) on 28 January 1977, with the aircraft to be built at Valmet's Kuorevesi plant.

== Operational history ==
The Vinka entered service on 13 October 1980 with deliveries continuing until 1982. Finnish Air Force pilot trainees flew about 100 hours on the Vinka at the Air Academy at Kauhava before converting to the British Aerospace Hawk jet trainer.

Valmet attempted to market the type internationally under the name L-70 Miltrainer, but no orders followed.

On 1 September 2022 the Vinka was removed from Air Force service after over 40 years of service, being replaced by 28 ex-RAF Grob G 115Es.

== L-80 TP Turbo Vinha ==
After unsuccessfully having tried to market the L-70 Vinka for the export market, Valmet developed a turboprop version with a new wing and a retractable undercarriage. This aircraft was given the designation L-80 TP Turbotrainer. The prototype (OH-VBB), powered by a 360 shp (268 kW) Allison 250 turboprop engine, made its first flight on 12 February 1985, piloted by Paavo Janhunen. The prototype was destroyed in an accident on 24 April that year, killing the pilot Paavo Janhunen and the flight observer. The second prototype was baptized Valmet L-90 TP and it was used for the development of the L-90 Redigo or RediGo (Both spelling versions are found in the brochures from the manufacturer).

== Operators ==
Finland
Finnish Air Force - 30 were built for the FiAF, serving with the Air Force Academy at Tikkakoski. The final Vinka was retired on 1 September 2022.

== Specifications (L-70 Vinka) ==
Data from Jane's All The World's Aircraft 1982–83

General characteristics

- Crew: 2
- Capacity: up to 2 passengers
- Length: 7.5 m (24 ft 7 in)
- Wingspan: 9.85 m (32 ft 4 in)
- Height: 3.31 m (10 ft 10 in)
- Wing area: 14 m^{2} (150 sq ft)
- Airfoil: NACA 63_{2}A615 mod
- Empty weight: 767 kg (1,691 lb)
- Gross weight: 1,050 kg (2,315 lb)
- Max takeoff weight: 1,250 kg (2,756 lb)
- Powerplant: 1 × Lycoming AEIO-360-A1B6 4-cylinder air-cooled horizontally-opposed piston engine, 149 kW (200 hp)
- Propellers: 2-bladed variable-pitch propeller

Performance

- Maximum speed: 240 km/h (150 mph, 130 kn)
- Cruise speed: 222 km/h (138 mph, 120 kn) 75% power at 1,525 m (5,003 ft)
- Stall speed: 85 km/h (53 mph, 46 kn) (flaps down, power off)
- Never exceed speed: 360 km/h (220 mph, 190 kn)
- Range: 860 km (530 mi, 460 nmi)
- Service ceiling: 5,000 m (16,000 ft)
- Rate of climb: 5.7 m/s (1,120 ft/min)

Armament

- Hardpoints: 4 underwing hardpoints with a capacity of
  - Inner hardpoints: 150 kg (330 lb) each
  - Outer hardpoints:100 kg (220 lb) each
  - Maximum external load: 300 kg (660 lb)

== See also ==
Related development

- Valmet L-80 Turbo-Vinha
- Valmet L-90 Redigo

Aircraft of comparable role, configuration, and era

- Scottish Aviation Bulldog
