= Kauhava Airfield =

Kauhava Airfield Kauhavan lentokenttä
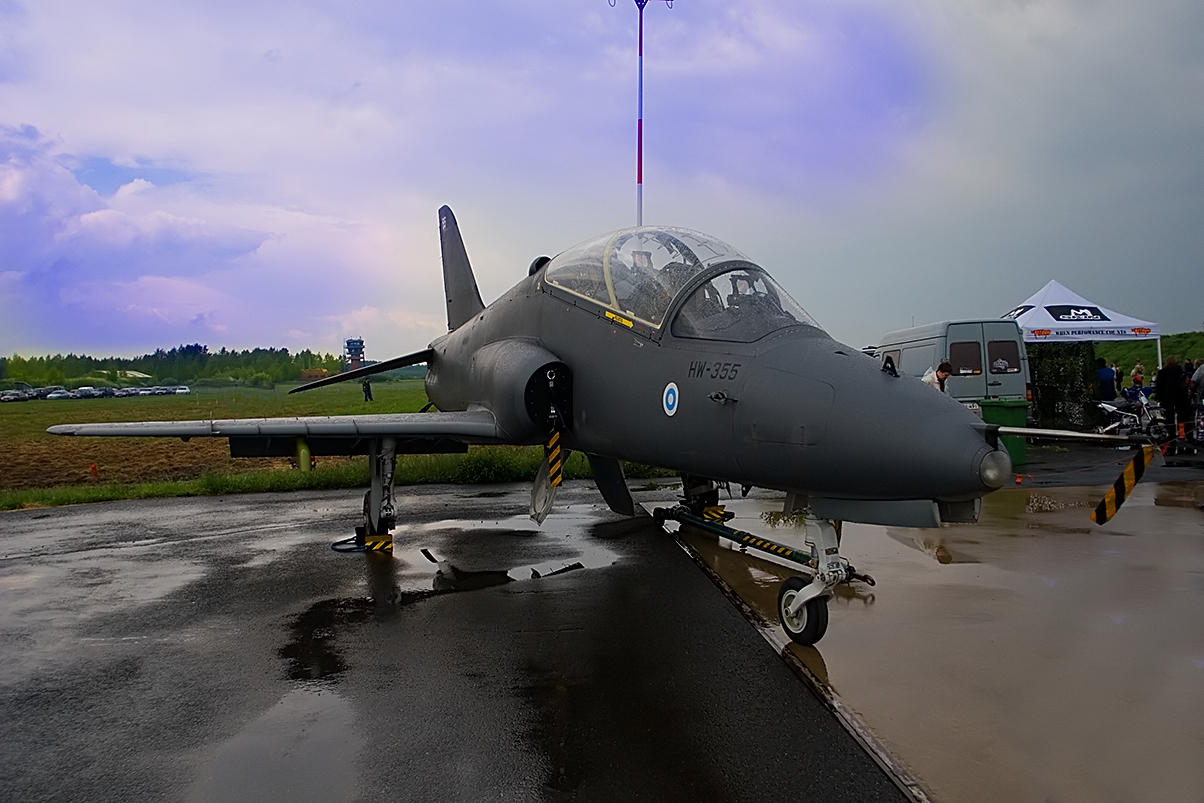
- BAe Hawk fighter of the Finnish Air Force at the airport
- IATA: KAU; ICAO: EFKA

Summary
- Airport type: Uncontrolled airfield
- Owner: LSK Business Park Oy
- Operator: Ilmasotakoulun Lentokerho ry
- Location: Kauhava, Finland
- Elevation AMSL: 46 m / 151 ft
- Coordinates: 63°07′27″N 023°03′04″E

Map
- Location within Finland

Runways
Direction	Length		Surface
Direction	m	ft	Surface
17/35	2,700	8,858	Asphalt

Statistics (2010)
- Passengers: 155
- Landings: 5900
- Source: Statistics from Finavia

Kauhava Airfield (IATA: KAU, ICAO: EFKA; Finnish: Kauhavan lentokenttä) is an airfield located in Kauhava, Finland, 3 kilometres (2 mi) north of Kauhava town centre.

The airfield used to be a military airport until the end of 2014, owned and operated by Finavia. Training Air Wing of the Finnish Air Force was based at the airport. In May 2014, Finavia announced that it would sell the airport properties to Kasvuyrittäjät Oy.

== See also ==
- List of the largest airports in the Nordic countries
