= Naming of military air bases =

Most countries with military aviation forces have a system for naming of military airbases. "Air Force Base" ("AFB") is part of the name of military airbases of the United States Air Force (USAF) and the South African Air Force (SAAF), with the USAF using it at the end of the name of the base (e.g. "Dover AFB"), and the SAAF using it at the start (e.g. "AFB Hoedspruit"). The Royal Australian Air Force uses a slightly different format referring to bases as "RAAF Base" (Royal Australian Air Force Base). The Canadian Forces also uses a different format referring to any base as "CFB" (Canadian Forces Base) or "BFC" in French (Base des Forces Canadiennes).

== Naming of British airbases ==
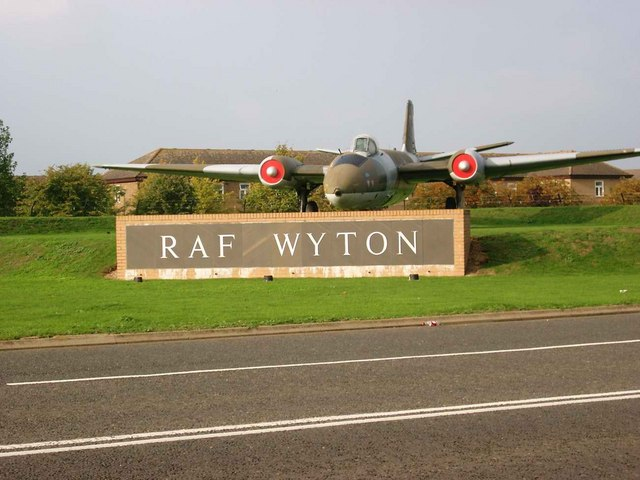
Entrance to RAF Wyton

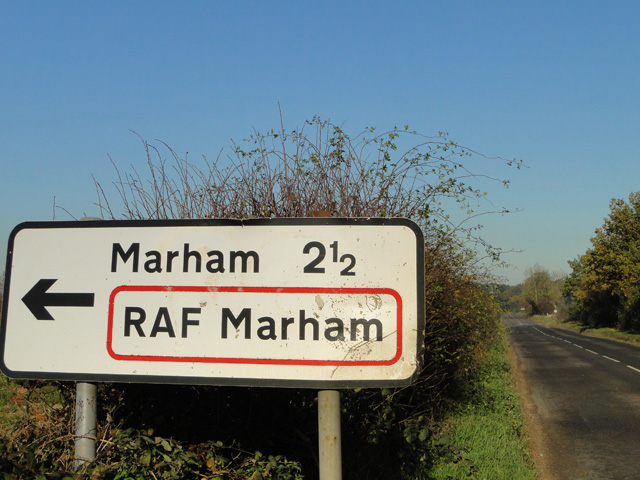
Roadsign to an RAF station

The Royal Air Force (RAF) identify their bases as "Royal Air Force stations", but for modern purposes this is usually abbreviated to "RAF" plus the name, e.g. RAF Marham. They are generally named after the closest railway station as rail travel was the main means of transport for service personnel in the early days of the RAF. Many RAF stations have long since lost their local railway station. Other bases were named after the local village, or used the name of the building in which they resided, such as RAF Bentley Priory. There is no difference in nomenclature for non-flying RAF stations, and overseas RAF stations have followed the same principles.

The aviation division of the Royal Navy, the Fleet Air Arm (FAA) generally follow the same principles of naming as the RAF, but are instead prefixed with Royal Naval Air Station (RNAS), such as RNAS Yeovilton. However, in maintaining the maritime link, all Royal Navy air stations are additionally named in the same manner as the Navy's ships – in Yeoviltons' instance, it is also called HMS Heron.

The British Army Air Corps uses a variety of terms due to the very mixed nature of its bases, sharing facilities with the RAF (at RAF Odiham), the Royal Navy (at RNAS Yeovilton), the tri-service Joint Aviation Command (at Aldergrove Flying Station), and the SAS (at Stirling Lines, Hereford). The remaining two bases are Middle Wallop Flying Station, and Wattisham Flying Station, formerly 'Wattisham Airfield', and before that RAF Wattisham.

== Naming of United States airbases ==
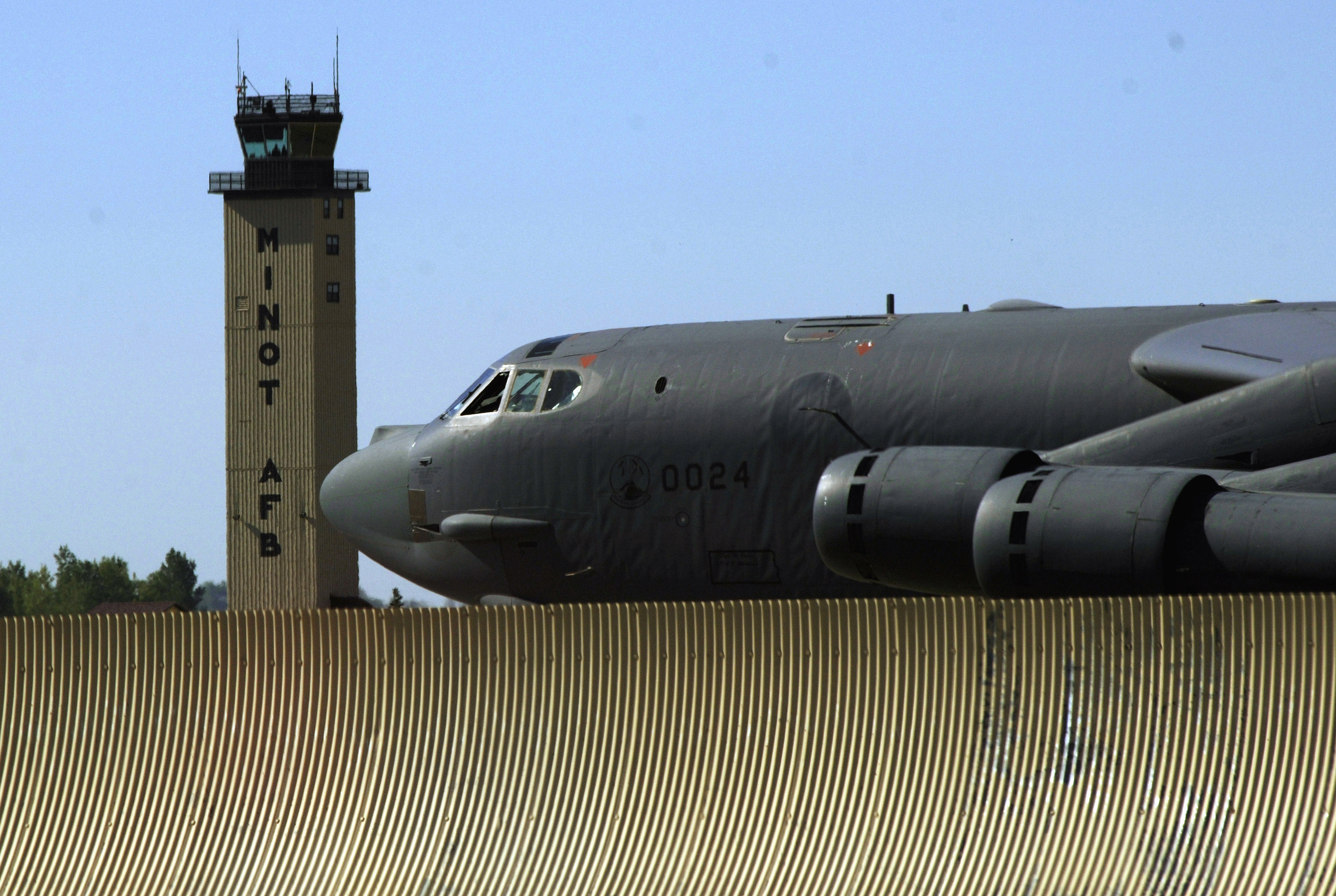
USAF Minot AFB, as displayed on their control tower

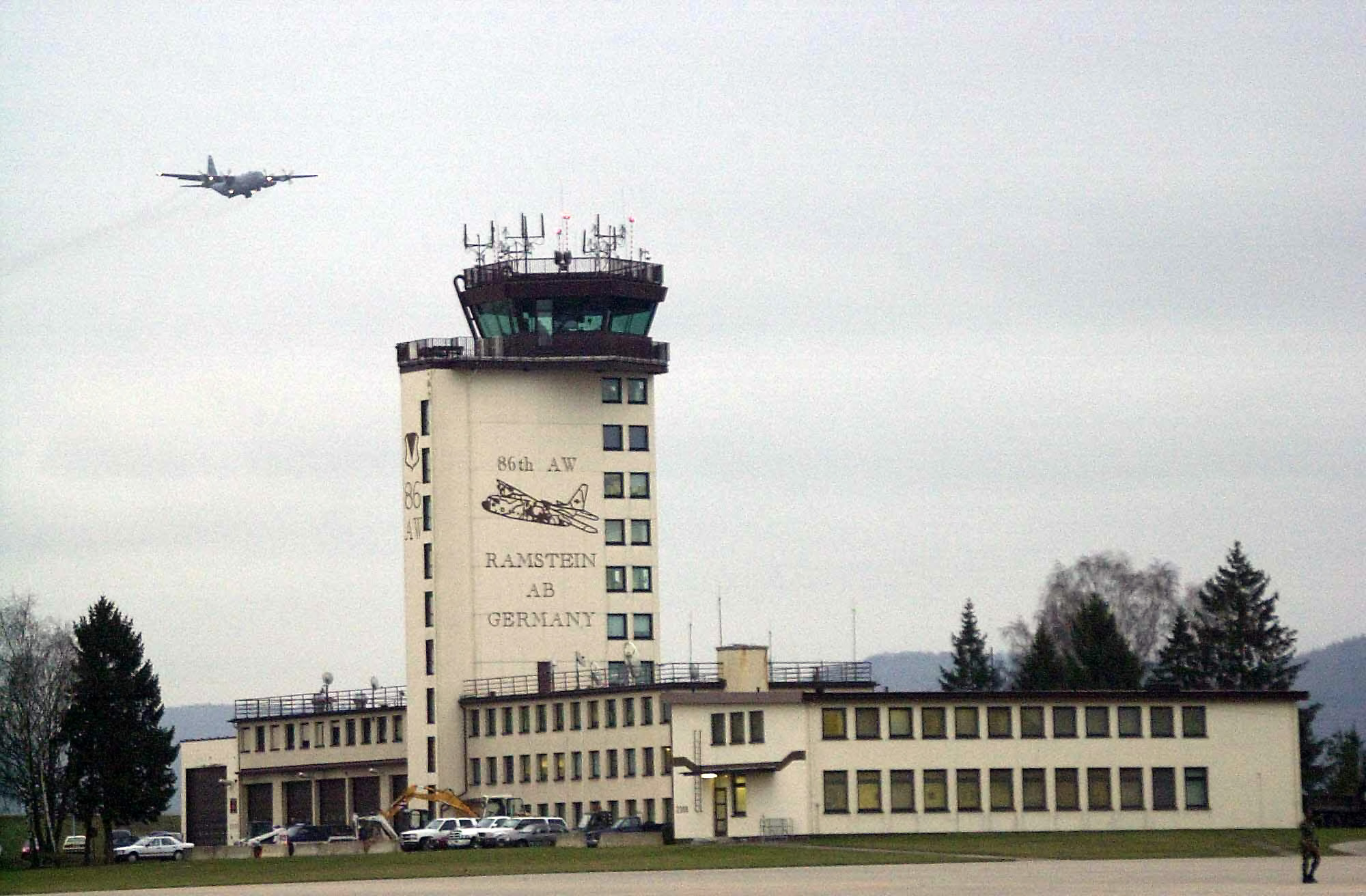
USAF Ramstein AB, Germany, as displayed on their control tower

United States Air Force, United States Air Force Reserves, United States Space Force, and some Air National Guard bases are usually named after a person of military or governmental significance. Examples include Edwards Air Force Base, Selfridge Air National Guard Base, Patrick Space Force Base, and General Mitchell Air Reserve Base. Sometimes bases are named after a nearby city. Examples include Little Rock Air Force Base, Dover Air Force Base, Columbus Air Force Base and Charleston Air Force Base; this is especially true in regards to most ANG bases such as Charlotte Air National Guard Base and Bangor Air National Guard Base. The designation of Air Force Station is usually given to smaller Air Force installations and/or those with very little or no flight activity (e.g. Cape Canaveral Space Force Station, Bellows Air Force Station, Blue Ash Air Station), although there are cases where installations with no flight activity still use the term "Air Force Base" instead of Station (e.g., Bolling Air Force Base, Hanscom Air Force Base). USAF bases located in other countries are usually named after the city or region where they're located and are referred to as Air Bases and Air Stations rather than Air Force Bases (e.g. Spangdahlem Air Base in Germany). (For USAF bases in the UK, see section below.) The Air Force also has a few "Auxiliary Fields" that are used mostly for training purposes, such as North Auxiliary Airfield and Gila Bend Air Force Auxiliary Field.

The United States Army call their air bases Army Airfields and like the Air Force and Space Force, names many of them after a military or government figure (e.g. Biggs Army Airfield). Some Army Airfields are named for the Army base where they're located as well (e.g. Campbell Army Airfield, located at Fort Campbell). The Army also has Army Heliports such as Hanchey Army Heliport. As titled, these airfields are mostly used by helicopters and other "rotary wing" aircraft.

The United States Navy, United States Marine Corps, and United States Coast Guard generally prefer to name their bases for the area where they're located (e.g. Naval Air Station Pensacola, Marine Corps Air Station Cherry Point, and Coast Guard Air Station Elizabeth City). This is also to avoid longer names given by the pilots if names of persons are added. The Navy and Marine Corps also operates a number of Outlying Landing Fields, auxiliary airfields primarily used for flight training purposes. (Naval Outlying Landing Field Imperial Beach, Marine Corps Outlying Field Oak Grove, Marine Corps Auxiliary Landing Field Bogue, etc.)

There are also a number of joint air bases throughout the U.S. These bases are owned & operated by one particular military component and will have other military units (and sometimes non-military governmental air units) garrisoned at the base. Examples include Naval Air Station Joint Reserve Base New Orleans, Minneapolis–Saint Paul Joint Air Reserve Station, Joint Base Andrews and Naval Air Station Joint Reserve Base Fort Worth.

== USAFE bases in Britain ==
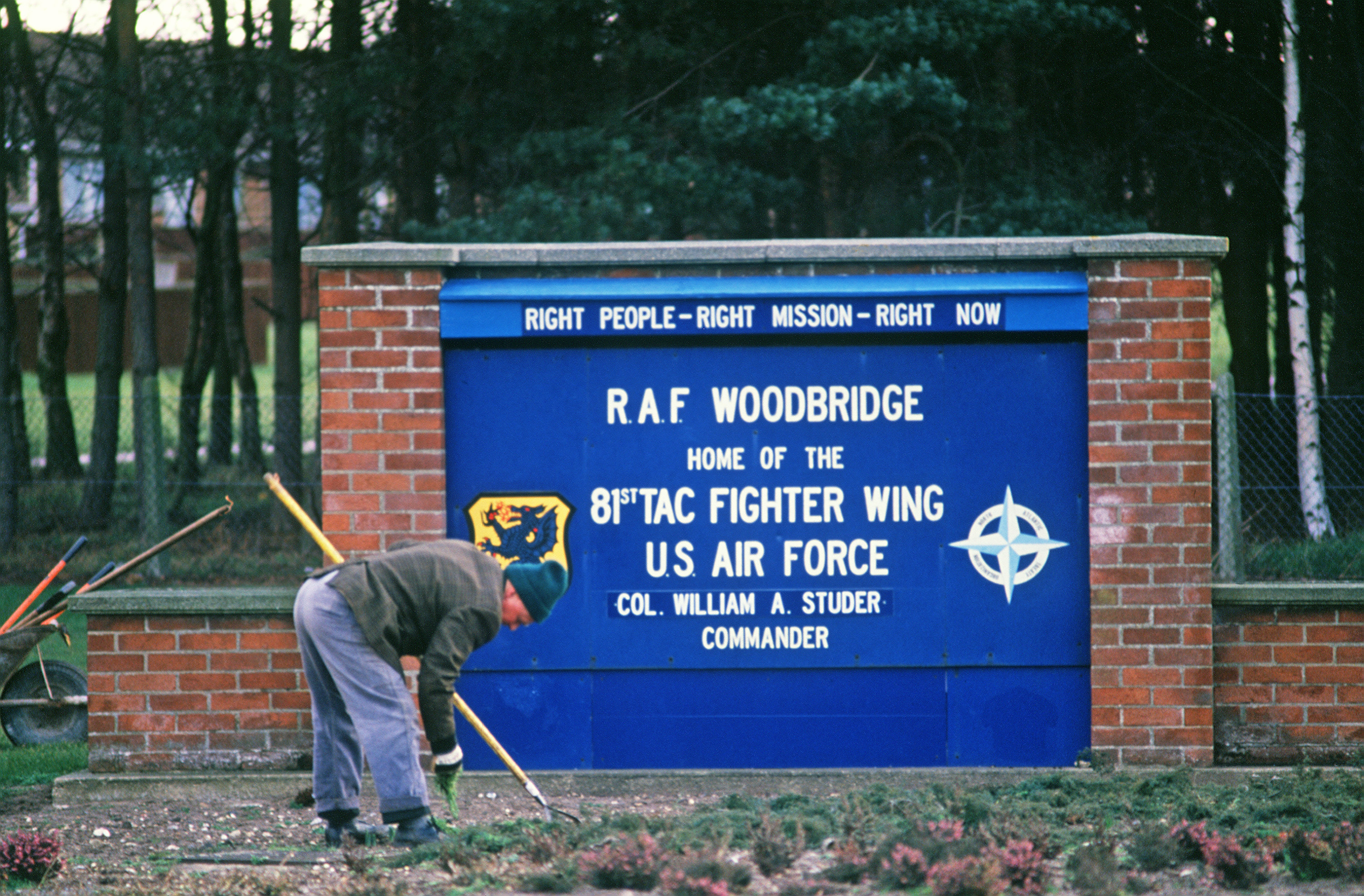
RAF Woodbridge entrance sign 1987

US bases located in the United Kingdom exist on land owned by the (UK) Ministry of Defence, and are identified on road signage as if they were simply RAF bases e.g. 'RAF Lakenheath'. This principle extends to USAF media (e.g. usafe.af.mil), mainstream US media (e.g. NBC News), and signs at main entrances such as 'Royal Air Force / Mildenhall / United States Air Force'. Other examples of USAF bases located in the UK include; RAF Alconbury, RAF Lakenheath, RAF Bentwaters/RAF Woodbridge (closed), RAF Upper Heyford (closed), RAF Burtonwood (closed), RAF Sculthorpe, RAF Molesworth, etc.

- See also; Installations_of_the_United_States_Air_Force_in_the_United_Kingdom Category:Installations of the United States Air Force in the United Kingdom
