= Valmet L-90 Redigo =

1985 Finish trainer aircraft family

M-290TP / L-90TP RediGO
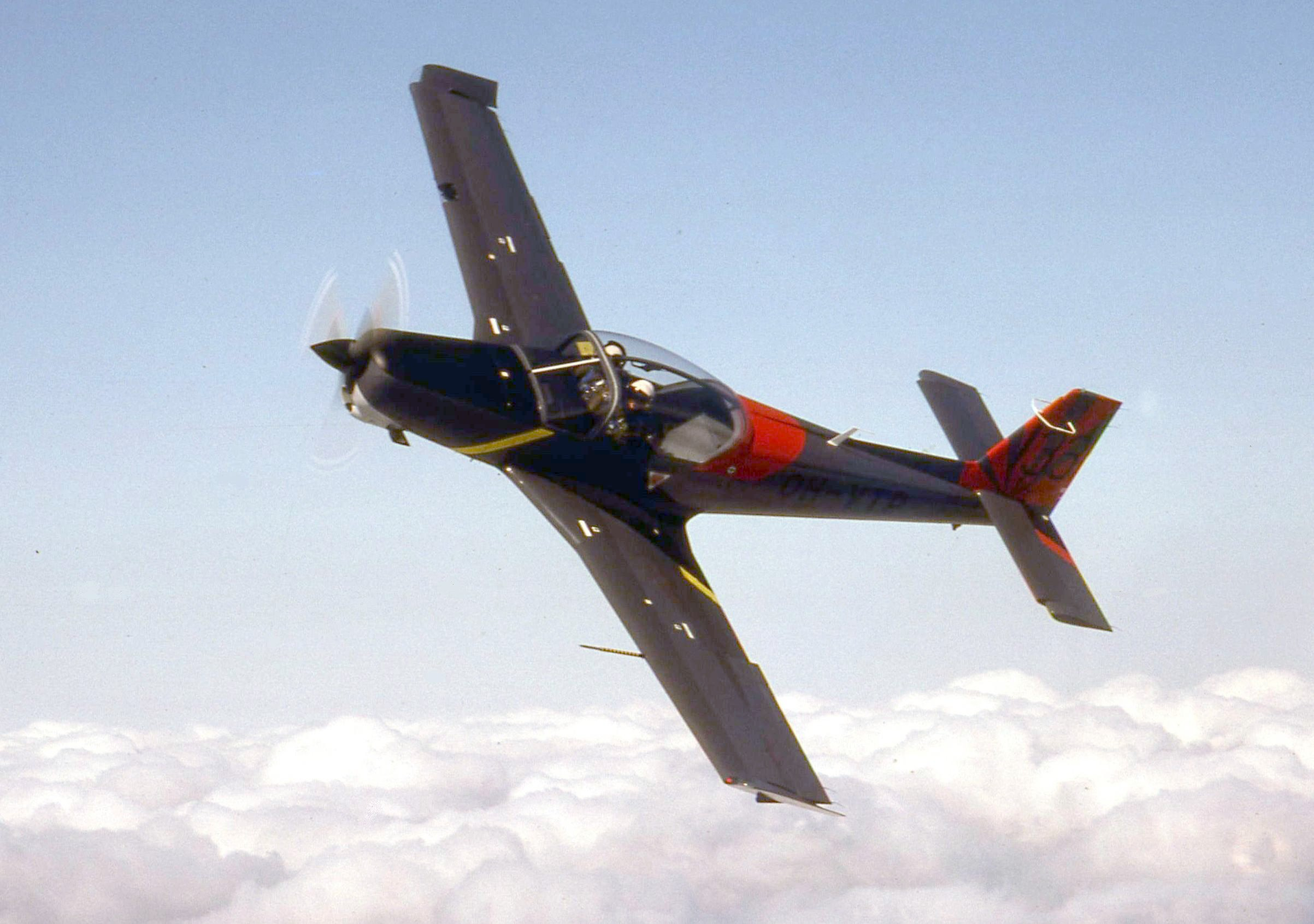

General information
- Type: Trainer / Liaison
- Manufacturer: Valmet; Aermacchi
- Status: Retired
- Primary users: Finnish Air Force Eritrean Air Force; Mexican Navy; Top Aces
- Number built: 31

History
- Manufactured: 1985–1995
- Introduction date: March 7, 1985
- First flight: February 12, 1985
- Developed from: Valmet L-70 Vinka; Valmet L-80 Turbo-Vinha

The Valmet L-90 Redigo is a turboprop-powered military basic trainer aircraft and liaison aircraft, a development of Valmet's earlier training aircraft for the Finnish Air Force. The L-90 was the last military aircraft designed and produced in Finland.

== Design and development ==
The prototype, a modified L-80, first flew on February 12, 1985. A second prototype, powered by a Turbomeca TP319 turboprop, was destroyed in an accident in August 1988. A total of 29 production aircraft plus the 2 prototypes were produced. Aermacchi purchased the manufacturing rights in 1996 but never returned the aircraft to production.

The aircraft is of conventional configuration, with retractable tricycle gear and a low wing. The student and instructor sit side-by-side. As is typical with many military trainers, it can also carry light armament for weapons training, or potentially, for use in a close-support role. The Finnish Air Force only used the L-90 as a liaison aircraft.

== Operators ==
Eritrea
Eritrean Air Force 6 retired
Finland
Finnish Air Force, 10 units, the whole fleet retired
Mexico
Mexican Navy 7, all of them currently retired

=== Civil ===
United States

- Blue Air Training : 6 Valmet A-90 Raider

== Specifications (M-290 TP) ==
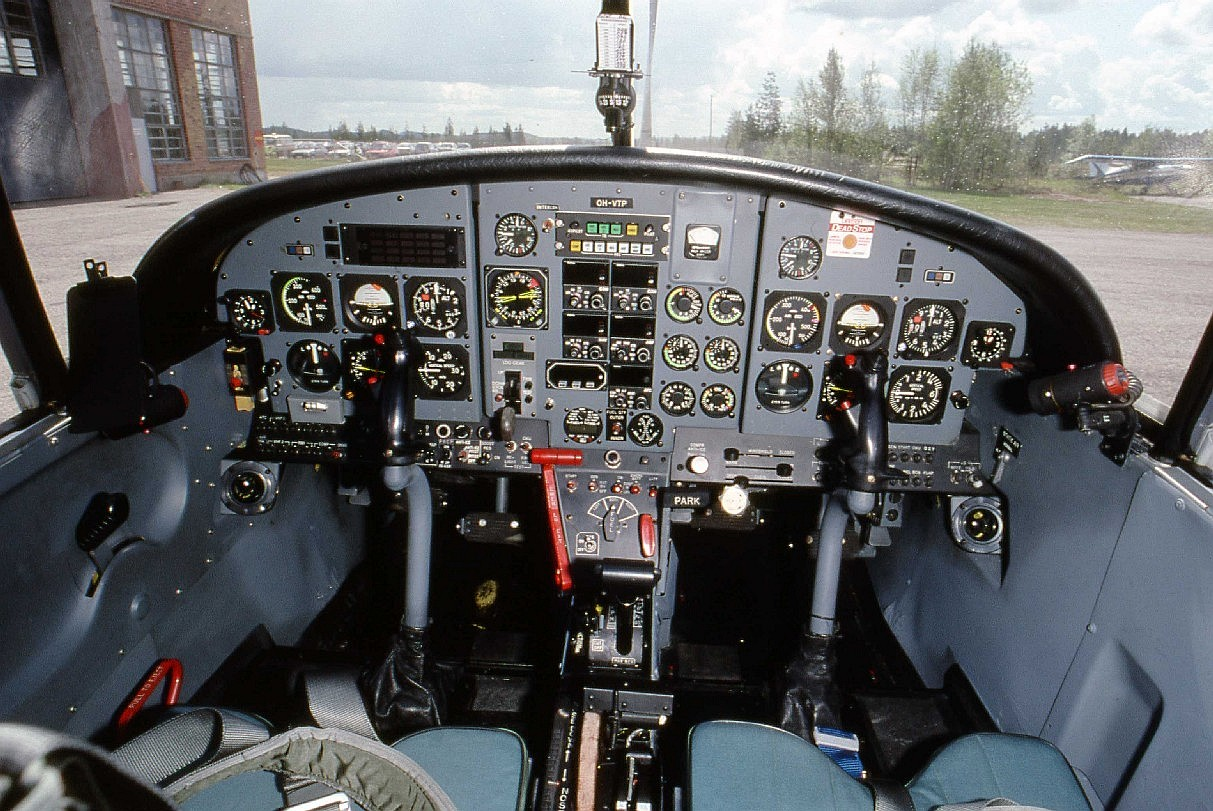
Redigo cockpit

Data from Brassey's World Aircraft and Systems Directory 1999/2000

General characteristics

- Crew: 2
- Capacity: Can accommodate additional two passengers or stretcher with patient
- Length: 8.53 m (28 ft 0 in)
- Wingspan: 10.60 m (34 ft 9 in)
- Height: 3.20 m (10 ft 6 in)
- Wing area: 14.8 m^{2} (159 sq ft)
- Airfoil: root: NACA 63-218 (mod); tip: NACA 63-412 (mod)
- Empty weight: 970 kg (2,138 lb)
- Max takeoff weight: 1,350 kg (2,976 lb) clean – Acrobatic category

1,470 kg (3,240 lb) clean – Utility category
1,600 kg (3,500 lb) clean – Normal category
1,900 kg (4,200 lb) w/ external stores – Normal category

- Powerplant: 1 × Allison 250-B17F turboprop, 340 kW (450 hp)

Performance

- Maximum speed: 354 km/h (220 mph, 191 kn) TAS @ 3,281 m (10,764 ft) & 1,600 kg (3,500 lb), clean
- Cruise speed: 326 km/h (203 mph, 176 kn) TAS @ 3,281 m (10,764 ft) & 1,600 kg (3,500 lb), clean
- Stall speed: 93 km/h (58 mph, 50 kn)
- Never exceed speed: 415 km/h (258 mph, 224 kn) IAS
- Range: 1,000 km (620 mi, 540 nmi) #@ 1,600 kg (3,500 lb) normal cruise speed, clean
- Service ceiling: 6,340 m (20,800 ft) (engine limitation)
- g limits: +7.0 −3.5 @ 1,350 kg (2,980 lb) – Aerobatic Category Limit

+4.4 −1.76 @ 1,470 kg (3,240 lb) – Utility Category Limit
+3.8 −1.52 @ 1,600 kg (3,500 lb) – Normal Category Limit (clean)
+3.8 −1.52 @ 1,900 kg (4,200 lb) – Normal Category Limit (w/ external stores)

- Rate of climb: 9.3 m/s (1,830 ft/min) @ 1,600 kg (3,500 lb) ISA

6.3 m/s (1,240 ft/min) @ 1,900 kg (4,200 lb) ISA

- Wing loading: 91.6 kg/m^{2} (18.8 lb/sq ft)
- Power/mass: 0.25 kW/kg (0.15 hp/lb)

Armament

- Hardpoints: Six hardpoints for a maximum of 800 kg (1,800 lb) of weapons

== See also ==
Related development

- Valmet L-70 Vinka
- Valmet L-80 Turbo-Vinha
- Valmet A-90 Raider

Aircraft of comparable role, configuration, and era

- Aermacchi SF.260
- Beech T-34
- Enaer T-35 Pillan

Related lists

- List of military aircraft of Finland
