= Trainer aircraft =

Aircraft designed for training of pilots and aircrew

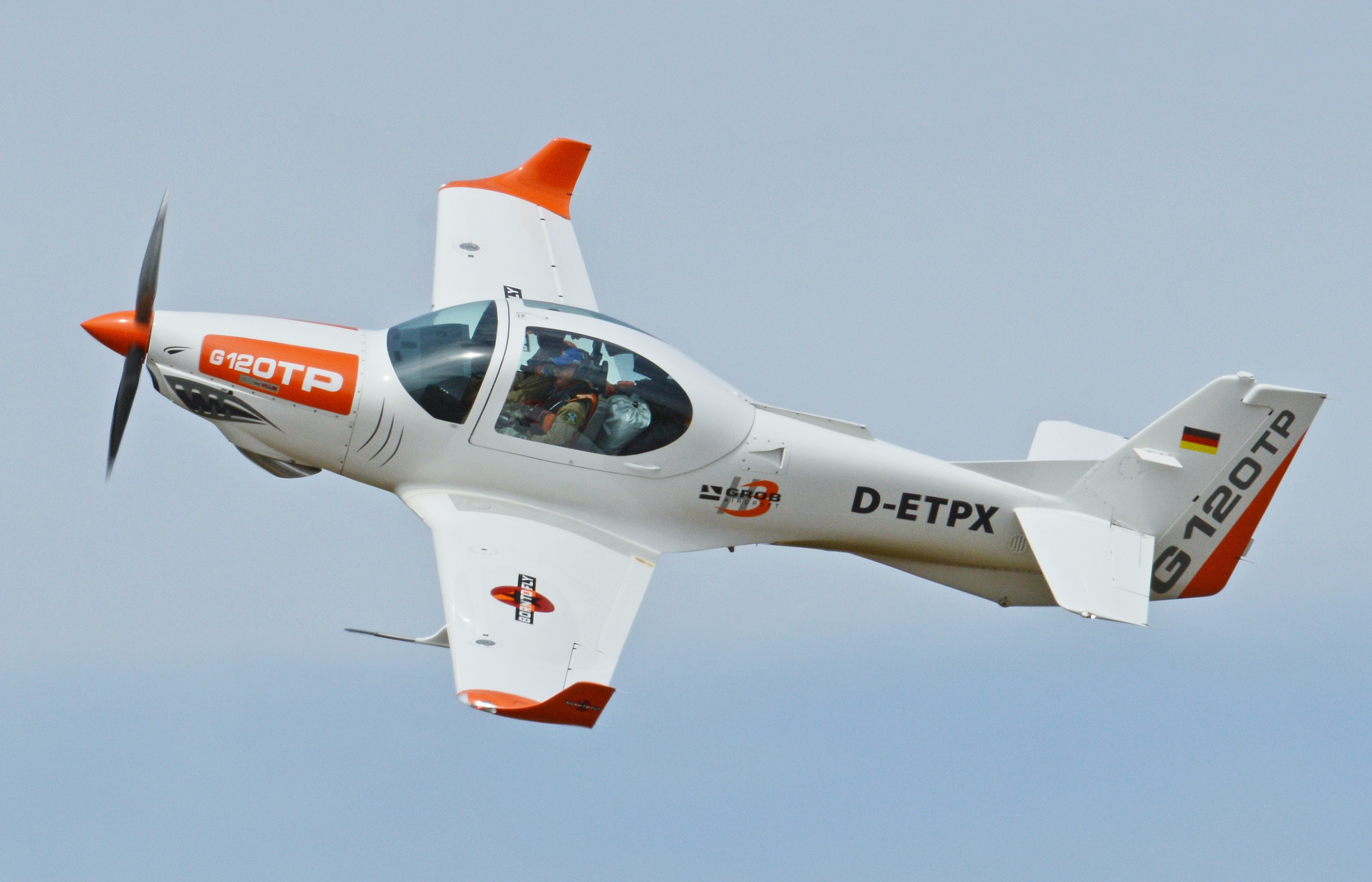
Grob G 120TP, a trainer aircraft

A trainer is a class of aircraft designed specifically to facilitate flight training of pilots and aircrews. The use of a dedicated trainer aircraft with additional safety features—such as tandem flight controls, forgiving flight characteristics and a simplified cockpit arrangement—allows pilots-in-training to safely advance their skills in a more forgiving aircraft.

Civilian pilots are normally trained in a light aircraft, with two or more seats to allow for a student and instructor.

== Tandem and side by side ==
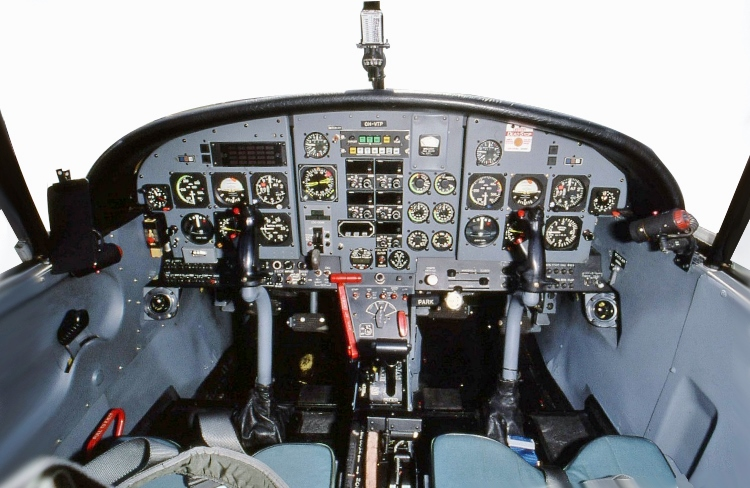
Valmet L-90 cockpit showing its side-by-side seating

The two seating configurations for trainer aircraft are: pilot and instructor side by side, or in tandem, usually with the pilot in front and the instructor behind. The side-by-side seating configuration has the advantage that the pilot and instructor can see each other's actions, allowing the pilot to learn from the instructor and the instructor to correct the student pilot. The tandem configuration has the advantage of being closer to the normal working environment that a fast jet pilot is likely to encounter.

It is now the norm for pilots to begin their flight training in an aircraft with side-by-side seating and to progress to aircraft with tandem seating. This, however, has not always been the case. For example, it was usual to find tandem seating in biplane basic trainers such as the Tiger Moth and the Jungmann, and the British used side-by-side seating in the operational conversion of some of its fast jets such as the English Electric Lightning.

== Phases ==
Given the expense of military pilot training, air forces typically conduct training in phases to eliminate unsuitable candidates. The cost to those air forces that do not follow a graduated training regimen is not just monetary but also in lives. For example, for many years, the Indian Air Force operated without a suitable advanced training aircraft, leading to a high casualty rate as pilots moved to high-performance MiG-21 aircraft without suitable assessment of their aptitude for supersonic flight.

There are two main areas for instruction: flight training and operational training. In flight training, a candidate seeks to develop their flying skills. In operational training, the candidate learns to use their flying skills through simulated combat, attack, and fighter techniques.

=== Ab initio ===
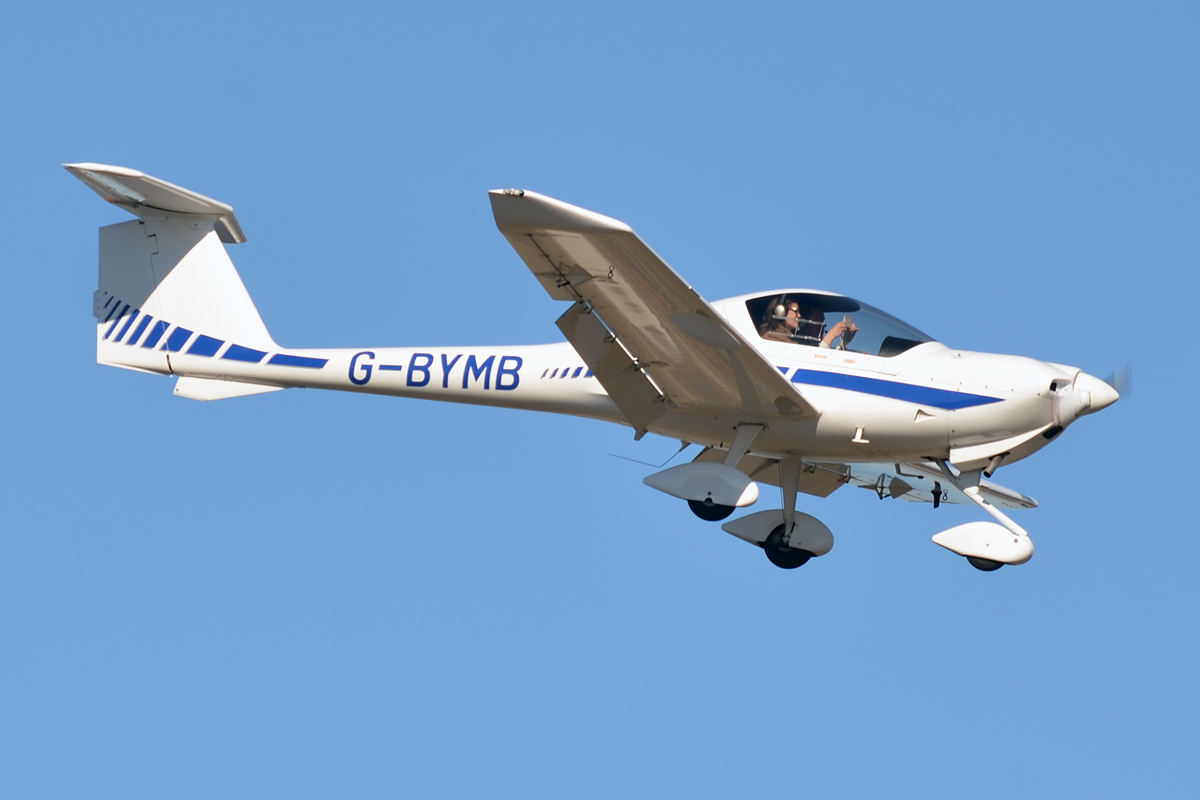
Diamond DA20, a trainer aircraft

Typically, contemporary military pilots learn initial flying skills in a light aircraft not too dissimilar from civilian training aircraft; ab initio meaning “from the beginning” in Latin. In this phase, pilot candidates are screened for mental and physical attributes. Aircraft used for this purpose include the Slingsby Firefly, as at one time used by the United States Air Force Academy, and the Scottish Aviation Bulldogs of the RAF. The U.S. replaced the Firefly and the Enhanced Flight Screen Program (EFSP) with the Diamond DA20 and the Initial Flight Training (IFT) program. At the end of this stage, pilot trainees are assessed, and those who pass advance to the full pilot training program. Those who are judged unsuitable for a pilot commission, but show other attributes, may be offered the chance to qualify as navigators and weapons officers. Smaller and more financially restricted air forces may use ultra-light aircraft, gliders, and motor gliders for this role. The USAF Academy uses light piston-powered aircraft such as the Cirrus SR20 (designated T-53A) for basic cadet flight training.

=== Basic training ===
After the ab-initio phase, a candidate may progress to basic, or primary, trainers. These are usually turboprop trainers, like the Pilatus PC-9 and Embraer Tucano. Modern turboprop trainers can replicate the handling characteristics of jet aircraft as well as having sufficient performance to assess a candidate's technical ability at an aircraft's controls, reaction speed, and the ability to anticipate events. Prior to the availability of high-performance turboprops, basic training was conducted with jet aircraft such as the BAC Jet Provost, T-37 Tweet, and Fouga Magister. Those candidates who are not suitable to continue training as fast jet pilots may be offered flying commissions and be trained to fly multi-engined aircraft.

=== Advanced training ===
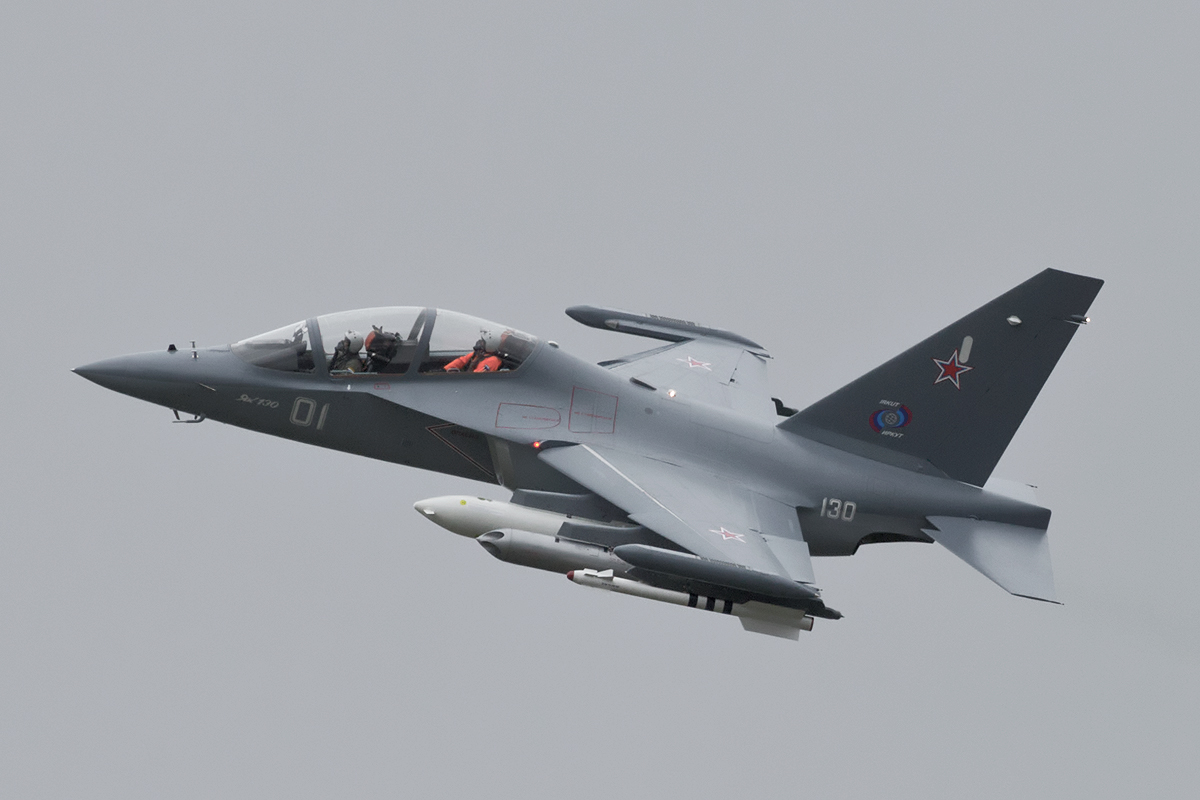
Yakovlev Yak-130 two-seat military trainer

Those that progress to training for fast jet flying will then progress to an advanced trainer, typically capable of high subsonic speeds, high-energy manoeuvers, and equipped with systems that simulate modern weapons and surveillance. Examples of such jet trainer aircraft include the supersonic Northrop T-38 Talon, Boeing–Saab T-7 Red Hawk, the BAE Hawk, the Dassault/Dornier Alpha Jet, the Aero L-39 and Aero L-159, the Alenia Aermacchi M-346 Master, the KAI T-50 Golden Eagle, the Guizhou JL-9, the Hongdu JL-10, the Pilatus PC-21 and the Yakovlev Yak-130.

Effective combat aircraft are a function now of electronics as much as, if not more so than, the aerobatic ability or speed of an aircraft. It is at this stage that a pilot begins to learn to operate radar systems and electronics. Modern advanced trainers feature programmable multi-function displays which can be programmed to simulate different electronic systems and scenarios. Most advanced trainers do not have radar systems of their own, but onboard systems can be programmed to simulate radar contacts. With datalinks and GPS, virtual radar systems can be created with similarly equipped aircraft relaying to each other their positions in real time and onboard computers creating a radar display based on this information. The aim of programmable displays is to speed pilot training by replicating as far as possible the systems a pilot will find in an operational aircraft.

=== Lead-in fighter training ===
Lead-in fighter training (LIFT) utilises advanced jet trainer aircraft with avionics and stores-management capability that emulate operational fighter planes, to provide efficient training in combat scenarios with reduced training costs compared to moving straight to operational conversion. The on-board avionics system may be linked to ground-based systems, and together they can simulate situations such as infrared or radar guided missile, interceptors, air-to-air and surface-to-air missiles, anti-aircraft batteries, radars, chaff and flare countermeasures and collision warnings, in low or dense electronic warfare environments. Systems may also be able to re-enact true-to-life combat situations.

=== Operational conversion ===
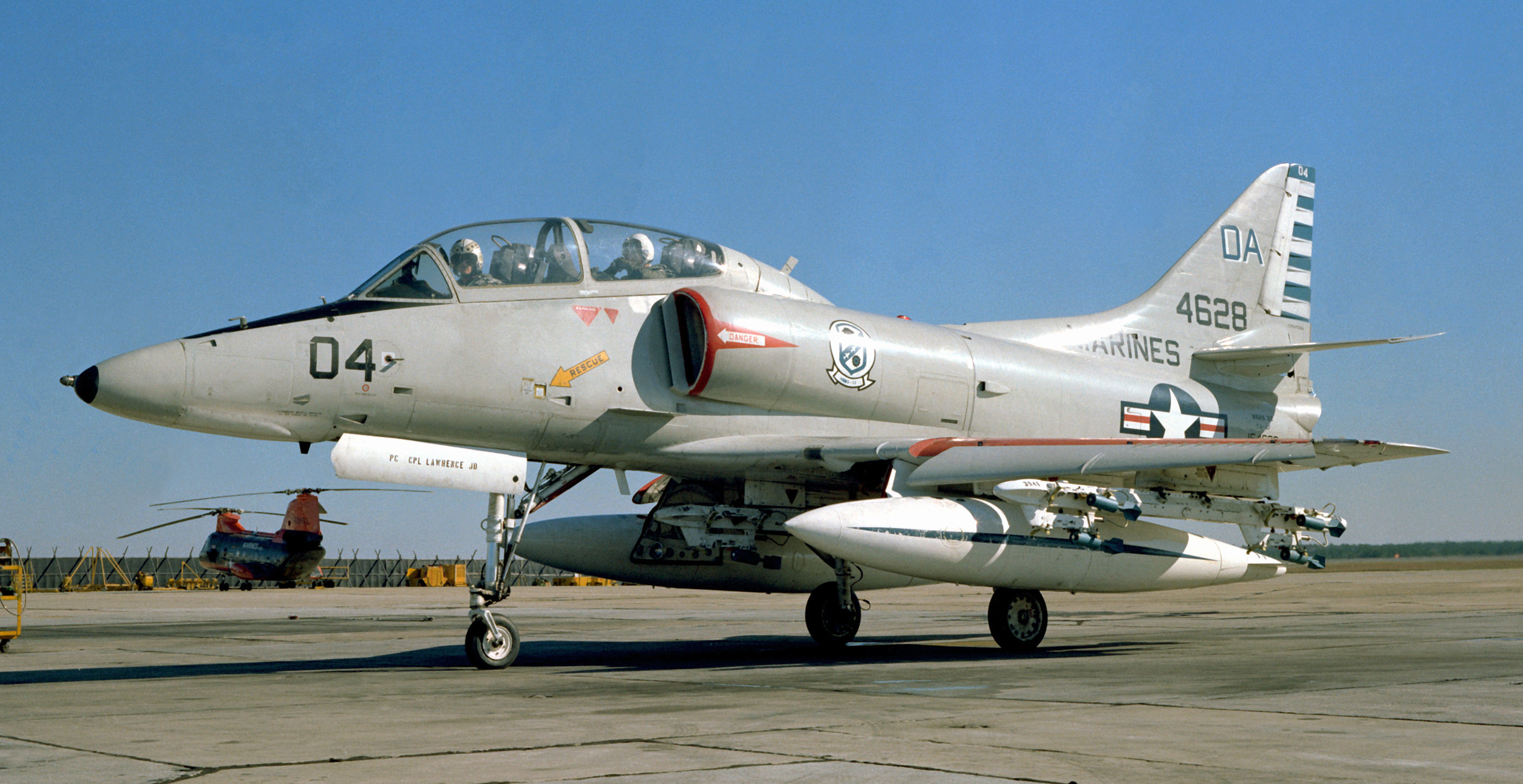
Douglas TA-4F, a two-seat combat-capable training version of the single seat A-4 Skyhawk.

Most military jet-powered combat aircraft have two-seat trainer versions. These are combat capable operational conversion aircraft types to provide on-the-job training to pilots who have graduated to this level, and are usually available with little conversion in times of emergency to a reconnaissance or combat role. Most operational conversion aircraft retain the full functionality of the operational version with slight degradations to performance due to increased weight and drag, and possibly reduced range due to a reduced internal fuel load.

In some two-seat fighter aircraft such as the Panavia Tornado, the operational conversion unit (OCU) aircraft can be created by duplicating flight controls in the rear cockpit. In a normally single-seat aircraft, a second cockpit can be built behind the original cockpit (e.g. the TA-4S variant of the A-4SU Super Skyhawk) or the cockpit can be extended to place the instructor in a second seat behind the pilot. Once they are qualified to fly a specific type of aircraft, pilots will continue with regular training exercises to maintain qualifications on that aircraft and to improve their skills, for example the USAF's Red Flag exercises. Deployments of small flights of aircraft together with support staff and equipment to exercises conducted by other nations can be used to develop fighting skills and interservice and inter unit competitions in bombing and gunnery between units can also be used to develop those skills.

The two-seat aircraft may itself become the basis of an operational aircraft, the second seat being used to create a weapons officer or navigators station in aircraft with originally only a pilot, for example the F-15E Strike Eagle is a development of the F-15D which is a two-seat training version of the F-15 Eagle.

In some air forces that have a mix of high- and low-performance aircraft, pilots can be first be assigned to aircraft with a lower level of performance before moving on to the most demanding aircraft. For example, in the Italian Air Force a pilot may begin their service career on the AMX attack aircraft, and as their experience grows, progress to more capable aircraft such as the Tornado IDS. Other air forces, such as Canada, do not do this, and assign first-tour pilots to aircraft such as the CF-18 Hornet.

=== Multi-engine trainers ===
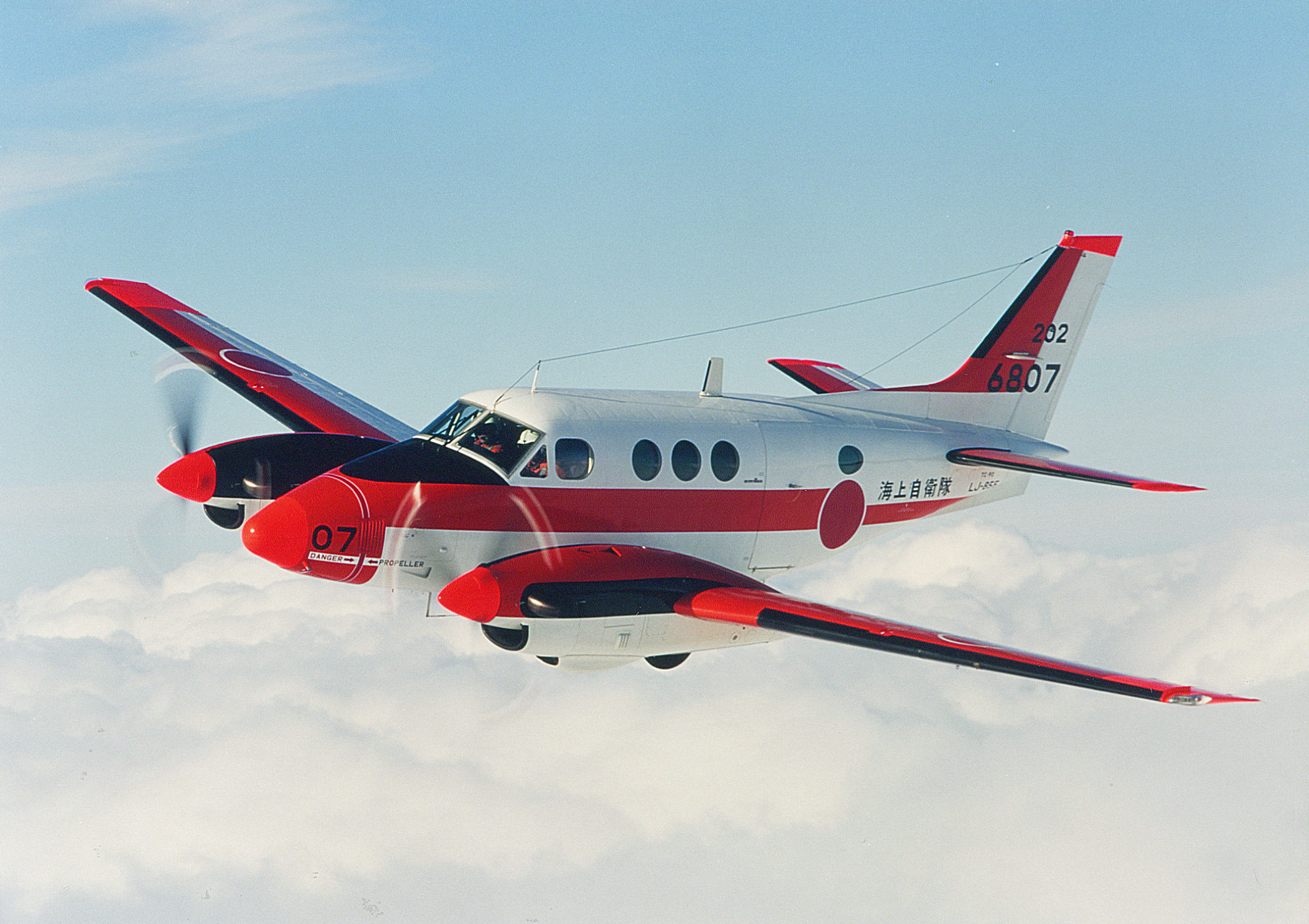
A Beechcraft King Air, used for multi-engined pilot training

Those pilots who train to fly transports, tankers and other multi-engine aircraft begin with small multi-engine aircraft such as the T-44A Pegasus variant of the Beechcraft King Air. Once they have mastered this, they may begin to fly in the right-hand seat of an operational type. Some air forces will seek to use a restricted number of multi-engined aircraft, with the derivatives of a basic aircraft filling different roles so that a pilot qualified on one of its types can easily convert to others in the same family. For example, the Boeing 707 was a popular airliner for conversion to tanker, transport and ELINT variants by numerous air forces.

=== Navigation trainers ===
A minority of military training aircraft, such as the Beechcraft 18, Vickers Varsity, Hawker Siddeley Dominie and Boeing T-43 were developed from transport designs to train navigators and other rear crews operators. As these navigational trainees are normally learning how to navigate using instruments, they can be seated at consoles within the aircraft cabin and do not require a direct view of the landscape over which the aircraft is flying. The operators of airborne weapons or radar-related systems can be similarly trained, either in training aircraft or in an operational aircraft during training flights.

== Aerobatic display teams ==
Some jet trainers, such as the Aermacchi MB-339, Casa C-101, Folland Gnat, Fouga Magister and British Aerospace Hawk, are used by national formation aerobatic teams. Early jet aerobatic teams tended to use combat types such as the Hawker Hunter, English Electric Lightning, and North American F-100 Super Sabre. As air forces' combat fleets were scaled-down, it made sense for most national display teams to change to lighter training types. A few modifications may be needed to enable coloured smoke to be emitted during displays, but essentially these airframes can still perform their pilot training function.

== Combat use of trainers ==
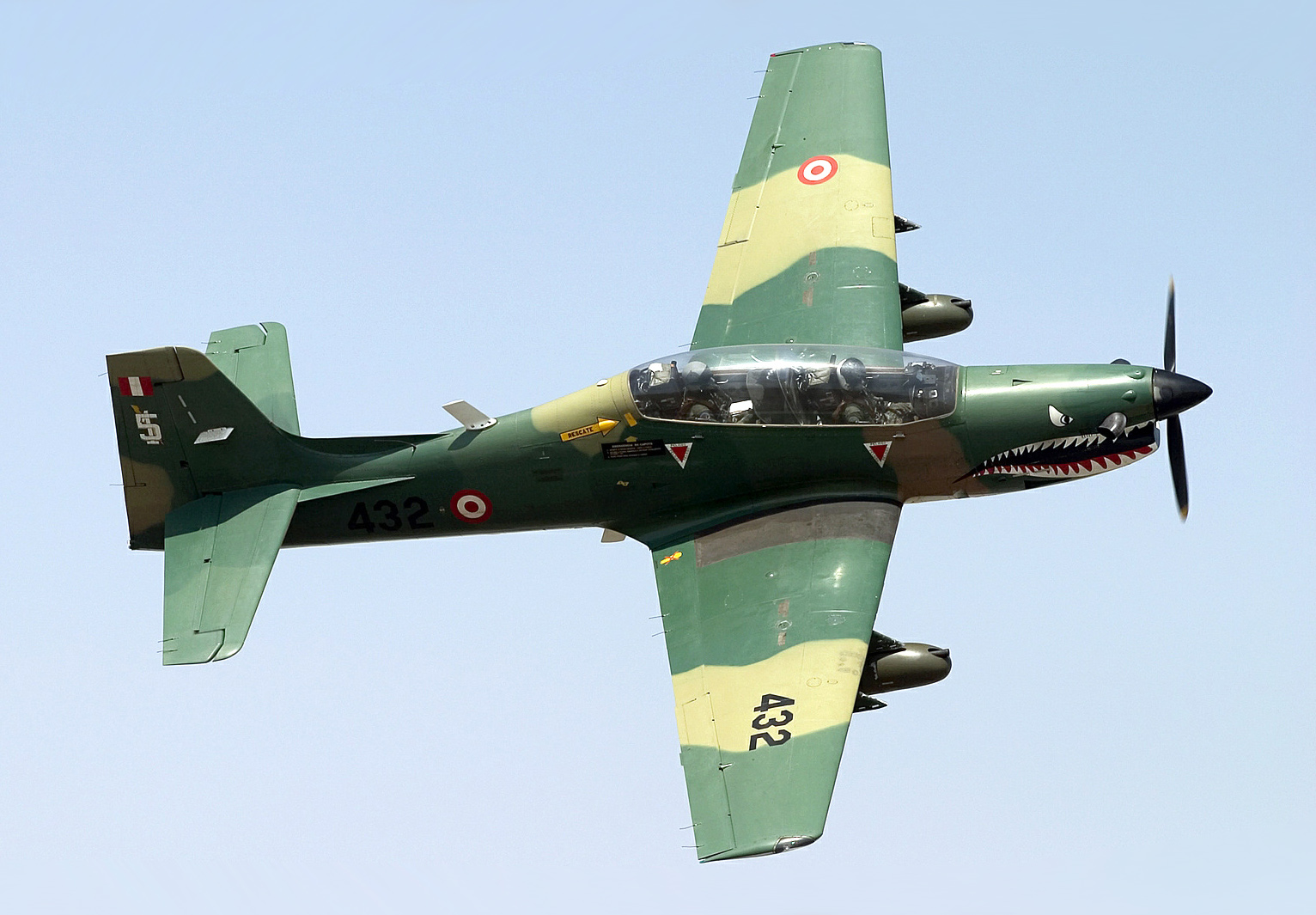
Peruvian Air Force Embraer EMB 312 Tucano, a single-turboprop trainer with counter-insurgency capability

In smaller air forces basic trainers, in addition to being used for training, are used to provide air support in the counter-insurgency and airborne forward air control role.

Most advanced trainers are capable of carrying and delivering war loads. However, most of these aircraft do not have the counter measures and sensors required to survive alone in a modern high intensity war fighting scenario, for example being vulnerable to MANPADS. However, they may still have a war fighting role in low intensity theatres if operated in conjunction with more capable aircraft.

Historically many jet trainers were marketed with specialised attack variants e.g. the BAC Jet Provost/BAC Strikemaster and the Cessna T-37 Tweet/A-37 Dragonfly. Especially against opponents operating without a fighter screen or an effective anti-aircraft capability, such trainer derived attack aircraft could perform adequately. For example, Impala aircraft derived from the Aermacchi MB-326 trainer formed the main strike strength of the South African Air Force in its Bush war, and aircraft such as the Hongdu JL-8 are being acquired for the attack role in low intensity theatres.

Despite their vulnerability, even small numbers of weapons-carrying trainer aircraft may achieve a disproportionate effect due to the element of surprise, especially when the attacked side believes to hold air supremacy. Forces that have used light trainer aircraft to great effect include the Biafran use of MFI-9s and the Liberation Tigers of Tamil Eelam use of covertly acquired light aircraft.

In high-intensity conflicts, advanced trainer type aircraft can have a military utility if they operate under an umbrella of other aerial assets. For example, the Franco-German Dassault/Dornier Alpha Jet had an anti-shipping and light strike role when operating under an air umbrella provided by fighter aircraft, while the RAF planned to use pairs of gun- and AIM-9 Sidewinder-armed Hawk trainers in the point defence role. Each pair of Hawks was to be teamed with a Phantom FGR.2, in effect using the Phantoms as an Airborne Early Warning and Control system. Although never tested it was believed that the Hawk, combined with AIM-9L and flown by some of the best pilots in the RAF including those from the Red Arrows, would have made a viable air defence fighter.

== The future ==
As the capabilities of front-line aircraft have increased, this has been reflected in increasingly sophisticated advanced trainers. As the costs of developing new aircraft have risen in real terms, it has become more likely that fewer aircraft will be designed specifically for the training role. The advanced trainer was often seen as a stepping stone by most nations in developing a fast jet design and manufacturing capability. With increasing costs, even major air forces will have difficulty reaching the economies of scale to justify development of new advanced trainers. Nations will be required to continue to push the modernisation of existing aircraft (some such as the Hawk dating from the 1970s) or co-operate in the development and procurement of advanced training aircraft. Furthermore, they must better utilise funding available by developing aircraft with an enhanced combat capability by producing operational single-seat variants, and better utilise aircraft on inventory incorporating operational systems either within the aircraft or as external pods.

The trend of programmable electronic systems and datalinks is likely to continue with the possibility that ground-based radar systems and processing systems will allow advanced training aircraft to function as if they truly had onboard radar systems, with the cockpit closely replicating the look and feel of an air force's more capable aircraft for maximum familiarity. Programmable engine management and fly-by-wire flight control systems will allow an aircraft to mimic the flight characteristics of frontline aircraft with actual performance being restricted to a pilot's level of ability, with more power and greater agility becoming available as a pilot's skill improves.

Training is now also carried out on ground-based simulators.

== Historical ==
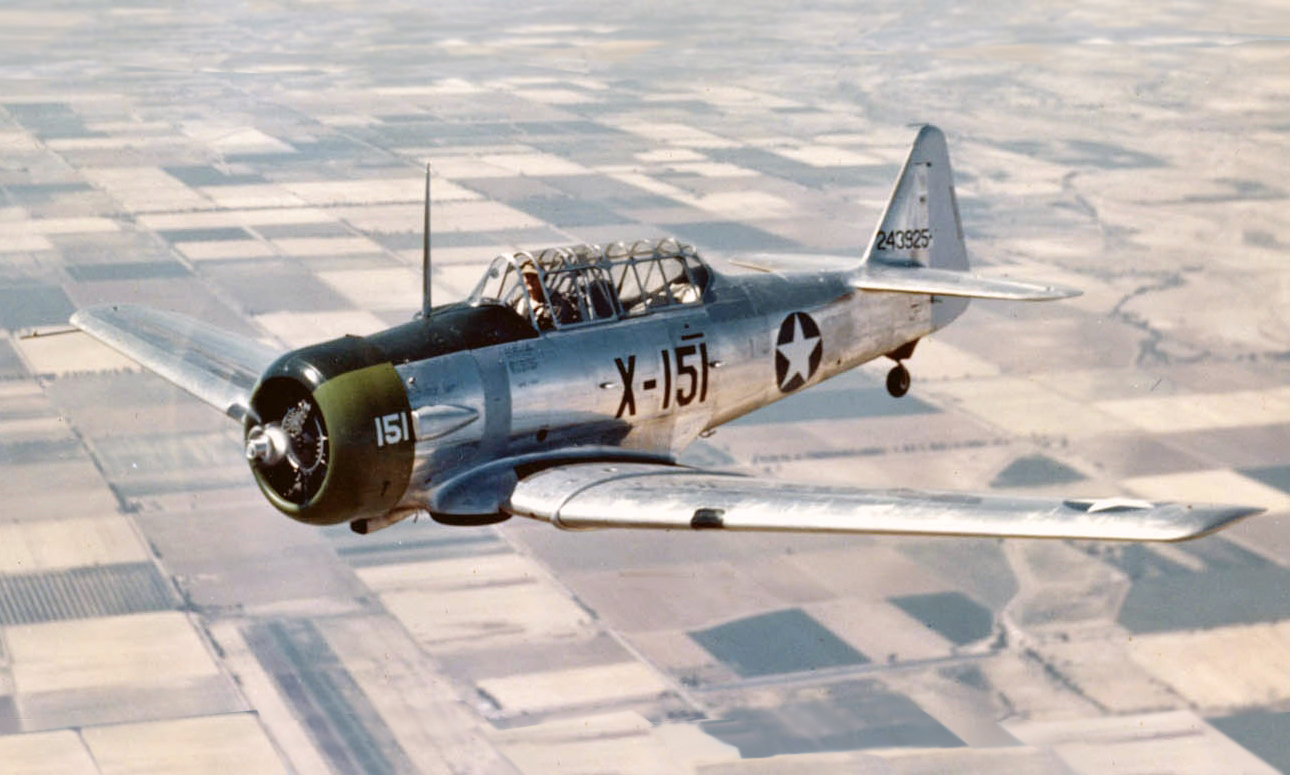
The North American Harvard, and T-6 Texan were among the most widely used trainers built

Early trainers were often sport aircraft or obsolete combat aircraft. The French used a graduated system in which a pilot learned in progressively more capable aircraft, starting with aircraft that had been modified to prevent them from flying – called rouleurs or penguins. Pilots who had mastered ground handling would then graduate to lower powered two seaters, before finishing on obsolete fighters. The supply of obsolete aircraft proved inadequate and production of Caudron G.III, Nieuport 83 and other types specifically for training was undertaken. In the United Kingdom, a different training system was used, although it too started out with obsolete aircraft before the Avro 504 and Airco DH.6 became the primary trainers, supplemented until the end of the First World War with obsolete combat aircraft for advanced training. To train the many potential aviators coming from Canada and the US, the Royal Flying Corps Canada was set up, operating Curtiss JN-4 (Can) trainers until the United States began its own training program, using Curtiss JN-4s and Standard J-1s. In Germany, various obsolete two seaters were produced for training purposes, the most numerous being the Albatros C.III.

Between the World Wars, purpose built trainers covering a variety of specialties largely replaced obsolete types in the Western armed forces, including aircraft specifically for bombing and gunnery and navigational training. When Germany began rearming in the 1930s, many of the initial aircraft were designed with a dual role, so that when they were obsolete in their combat role they would be used as trainers. By World War II, however, their needs exceeded what could be spared from production and although using a number of purpose built designs such as the Bücker Bü 131, relied largely on captured aircraft and obsolete combat types. The United States armed forces standardized on three types – a Primary trainer, of which the Stearman PT-13/PT-17 is the best known, a Basic trainer such as the Vultee BT-13, and an advanced trainer such as the well known North American AT-6 Texan, which would also be widely exported to the Commonwealth countries as the Harvard. In addition, production of various combat types was diverted to training although considerable effort was made to cover all possible types of training with purpose built types. The British organized the British Commonwealth Air Training Plan, which moved the bulk of aircrew training away from active war zones to Canada and elsewhere, where pilots started on the De Havilland Tiger Moth or Fleet Finch basic trainers before continuing on North American Harvards for advanced training, Avro Ansons, Airspeed Oxfords and Bristol Bolingbrokes for multi-engine as well as bombing training. Obsolete types such as the Fairey Battle and Westland Lysander were used for target towing, while other types such as the North American Yale were used for wireless operator (radio) training. Postwar, the United States operated the Beechcraft T-34 Mentor for basic flight training, while the United Kingdom operated the De Havilland Chipmunk. The North American T-28 Trojan replaced the T-6 in US service, while the Percival Provost filled a similar role with the RAF.
