= Valmet L-80 Turbo-Vinha =

Finnish prototype trainer aircraft

L-80

General information
- Type: Trainer
- Manufacturer: Valmet
- Status: cancelled
- Number built: one L-80, two L-90 prototypes

History
- Introduction date: 1983
- First flight: 12 February 1985
- Retired: 1990

The Valmet L-80 TP Turbo-Vinha was a prototype for a new Finnish turboprop basic trainer aircraft. The aircraft, which carried the registration OH-VBB, first flew on 12 February 1985. It was destroyed in a crash on 24 April 1985, during its 14th flight, killing the test pilot Paavo Janhunen. The aircraft was a further development of the Valmet L-70 Vinka and would eventually lead to the Valmet L-90 Redigo.

The Allison turboprop engine was used in the second aircraft, the L-80 TP Turbo-Vinha (OH-VTM) which was destroyed during an aerial display in Belgium. The third of the series (OH-VTP) got the new name Redigo or RediGo (used in sales brochures).

== Specifications (L-80 TP) ==
Data from Valmet's Turbotrainer, Jane's All the World's Aircraft 1984–85

General characteristics

- Crew: 1 or 2
- Capacity: up to 3
- Length: 7.88 m (25 ft 10 in)
- Wingspan: 10.25 m (33 ft 8 in)
- Height: 3.3 m (10 ft 10 in)
- Wing area: 14.00 m^{2} (150.7 sq ft)
- Aspect ratio: 7
- Airfoil: root: NACA NACA 63-218(mod B3); tip: NACA 63-412(mod B3)
- Empty weight: 840 kg (1,852 lb) equipped
- Max takeoff weight: 1,800 kg (3,968 lb) (and Max landing weight)
- Fuel capacity: 350 L (92 US gal; 77 imp gal) / 280 kg (617 lb)
- Powerplant: 1 × Allison 250-B17D turboprop engine, 268 kW (359 hp)
- Propellers: 3-bladed Hartzell, 2.19 m (7 ft 2 in) diameter constant-speed propeller

Performance

- Maximum speed: 350 km/h (220 mph, 190 kn) at 3,000 m (9,800 ft)
- Stall speed: 110 km/h (68 mph, 59 kn) idle, flaps up

99 km/h (62 mph; 53 kn) idle, flaps down

- Never exceed speed: 460 km/h (290 mph, 250 kn)
- Range: 1,550 km (960 mi, 840 nmi) max fuel, no reserve
- Service ceiling: 7,500 m (24,600 ft) +
- Rate of climb: 10.49 m/s (2,065 ft/min)
- Power/mass: 0.15 kW/kg (0.091 hp/lb)
- Take-off distance to 15 m (49 ft): 345 m (1,132 ft)
- Landing distance from 15 m (49 ft): 350 m (1,150 ft)

Armament

- Hardpoints: 4 with a capacity of Maximum 600 kg (1,323 lb) ; inboard pylons 250 kg (551 lb) ; outboard pylons 150 kg (331 lb), with provisions to carry combinations of:
  - Rockets: 37mm or 68 mm rocket pods
  - Missiles: anti-helicopter missiles
  - Bombs: 250 kg (551 lb) bombs
  - Other: various machine-gun pods, flares searchlight pods

== See also ==
Related development

- Valmet L-70
- Valmet L-90
