= Jussi Pernaa =

Finnish ice hockey player

- Born: 1 October 1983 (age 41); Kauhava, Finland
- Height: 6 ft 2 in (188 cm)
- Weight: 209 lb (95 kg; 14 st 13 lb)
- Position: Defence
- Shoots: Left
- SM-liiga team: Lukko
- Playing career: 2002–present

Jussi Pernaa is a Finnish former ice hockey defenceman who played professionally in Finland for Lukko of the SM-liiga and Sport Vaasa.

== Career statistics ==
			Regular season					Playoffs
Season	Team	League	GP	G	A	Pts	PIM	GP	G	A	Pts	PIM
1999–00	Hela-Kiekko	II-divisioona	25	12	11	23	71	—	—	—	—	—
2000–01	Hela-Kiekko	II-divisioona	23	7	7	14	40	—	—	—	—	—
2001–02	Lukko U20	U20 SM-liiga	13	4	1	5	4	—	—	—	—	—
2002–03	SHT	Suomi-sarja	22	11	6	17	37	—	—	—	—	—
2003–04	SHT	Suomi-sarja	25	10	9	19	14	—	—	—	—	—
2004–05	SHT	Suomi-sarja	31	17	13	30	86	5	1	4	5	4
2005–06	FPS	Mestis	23	2	6	8	16	—	—	—	—	—
2005–06	Ilves	SM-liiga	3	0	0	0	0	—	—	—	—	—
2005–06	Vaasan Sport	Mestis	15	3	9	12	12	11	1	0	1	4
2006–07	Vaasan Sport	Mestis	45	9	10	19	56	7	1	0	1	16
2007–08	Vaasan Sport	Mestis	26	5	3	8	32	5	0	0	0	6
2008–09	Vaasan Sport	Mestis	38	7	6	13	36	11	3	1	4	10
2009–10	Vaasan Sport	Mestis	38	8	11	19	63	4	1	2	3	2
2010–11	Lukko	SM-liiga	7	0	0	0	4	—	—	—	—	—
2010–11	LeKi	Mestis	1	0	2	2	4	—	—	—	—	—
2010–11	S-Kiekko	Suomi-sarja	17	6	6	12	32	—	—	—	—	—
2010–11	Hela-Kiekko	II-divisioona	1	1	0	1	0	—	—	—	—	—
2011–12	S-Kiekko	Suomi-sarja	14	1	4	5	24	—	—	—	—	—
2012–13	S-Kiekko	Suomi-sarja	38	10	14	24	64	—	—	—	—	—
2013–14	S-Kiekko	Suomi-sarja	24	8	8	16	49	1	0	1	1	0
2014–15	Hela-Kiekko	II-divisioona	9	7	5	12	32	5	0	1	1	4
2016–17	Kiekko-Veljet	II-divisioona	3	2	1	3	0	—	—	—	—	—
SM-liiga totals			10	0	0	0	4	—	—	—	—	—
Mestis totals			186	34	47	81	219	44	6	3	9	42
