= Air Force Academy (Finland) =

Coordinates: 62.3978°N 25.6034°E

- Insignia of the Air Force Academy
- Active: 2005-
- Country: Finland
- Branch: Finnish Air Force
- Role: Air defense training
- Garrison/HQ: Tikkakoski
- March: Sotamarssi

Insignia
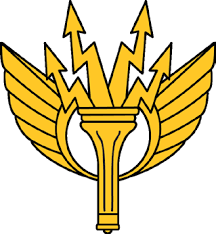
- Former distinctive unit insignia (2005 - 2015)

- Insignia of the Finnish Air Force

- Flag of the Air Force Academy

The Air Force Academy (Finnish: Ilmasotakoulu, abbr. ILMASK; Swedish: Luftkrigsskolan) is located at Tikkakoski in Jyväskylä, Finland. The primary mission of the Air Force Academy is to train warfighting airmen who can carry out their missions even under the most strenuous conditions. This includes conscripts, active duty personnel, and special forces such as pilots, aircraft and helicopter mechanics, and air surveillance controllers. The Air Force Academy also trains conscripts for general military operations. While training is primarily geared to serve air base functions, several conscripts are trained for jobs in the control and reporting centres. The Air Force Academy comprises a headquarters and a Communication Systems Training Flight, an Aircraft and Weapon Systems Training Flight, Reserve Non-Commissioned Officer Training School, and a Reserve Officer Training School.

Initial pilot training was formerly given in the Air Force Academy in Kauhava, but basic training was branched off as a separate unit and moved to Tikkakoski in 2005. At the same time, the Kauhava unit changed its name to Training Air Wing and was later disbanded in 2014. The new unit in Tikkakoski retained the name Air Force Academy.

The academy's insignia is known for having a swastika, whereas other countries have ceased using the symbol due to its association the Nazi Party in the Second World War. The swastika was also used as the Finnish Air Force's insignia until 1945, when the Allied Control Commission Decree probihited the usage of the symbol, due to Nazi Germany's usage of the symbol. Finland's usage of the symbol however predates the Nazis, and has officially used the ancient symbol on monuments, awards and decorations for nearly a century, and has been a cultural symbol of luck since at least the Iron Age.

== See also ==
- Valmet L-70 Vinka
