= Virtual radar =

Virtual radar is a simulated radar system used in training aircraft, which due to cost constraints, are not usually equipped with radar. The basis of the virtual radar system is a closed loop data network, where participants can share their GPS positioning data and supplemental Air Data Computer (ADC) data to calculate targeting information. It utilizes an airborne bus such as Ethernet or MIL-STD-1553.

== Background ==
Due to size and cost limitations, Trainer Planes are not able to accommodate a traditional radar system. ”Virtual Training” capability consists of implementation of a virtual radar capability as well as a ground-based mission management and debriefing capability. This provides an affordable solution to radar training to flight students and support future pilot training.

The airborne component of the “Virtual Radar” provides radar capability for both Air-To-Air (A/A) and Air-To-Ground (A/G) radar modes without the use of radar system.

The system provides data via airborne bus such as Ethernet or MIL-STD-1553B, to the Mission Display Processor (MDP) that simulates unclassified radar data. The system may also provide RS-170 video synthesizing A/G radar maps – Real Beam Maps Synthetic Aperture Radar (SAR) maps etc.

The basis of the virtual radar system is a closed loop data network. All participants in the Network can share their GPS positioning data and supplemental Air Data Computer (ADC) data to calculate targeting information like a radar system. All participants in the network must have a virtual radar system to either receive target data or generate target information to other participants.

The Ground-based portion of the Virtual Training must support training mission management when it is an active participant in the data network as well as provide post training mission debriefing capabilities with video and data review from data recorded on a Digital Video Recorder (DVR). The data network must support all virtual radar requirements with or without the participation of a Virtual Training Ground system.
