= Kauhava =

- Town
- Kauhavan kaupunki Kauhava stad
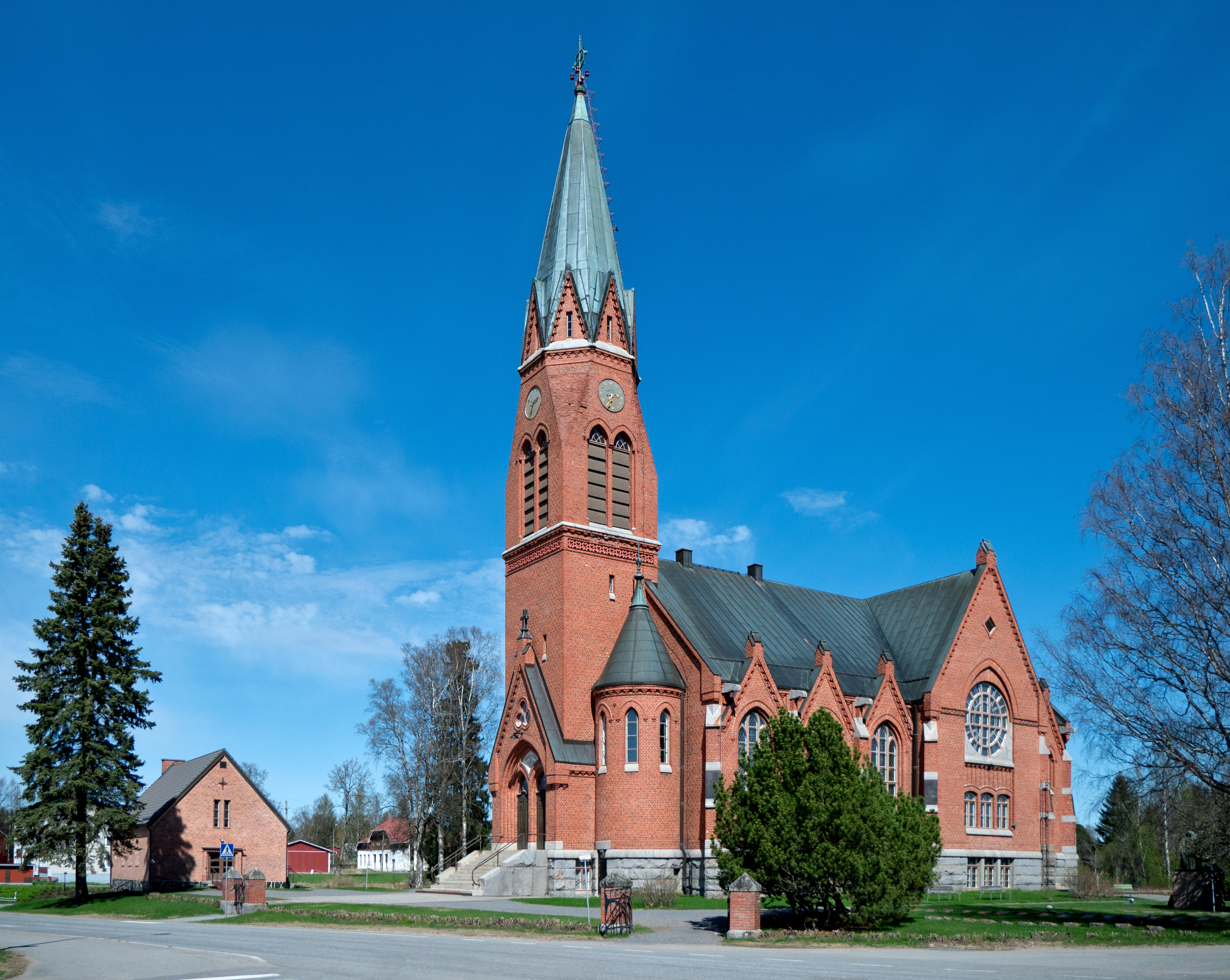
- Kauhava Church

- Flag Coat of arms

- Location of Kauhava in Finland
- Interactive map of Kauhava
- Coordinates: 63°06′N 023°04′E
- Country: Finland
- Region: South Ostrobothnia
- Sub-region: Seinäjoki
- Charter: 1867
- City rights: 1986

Government
  - Town manager: Vesa Rantala

Area (2018-01-01)
  - Total: 1,328.09 km^{2} (512.78 sq mi)
  - Land: 1,313.85 km^{2} (507.28 sq mi)
  - Water: 14.63 km^{2} (5.65 sq mi)
  - Rank: 52nd largest in Finland

Population (2025-12-31)
  - Total: 14,909
  - Rank: 74th largest in Finland
  - Density: 11.35/km^{2} (29.4/sq mi)

Population by native language
  - Finnish: 92.7% (official)
  - Swedish: 0.7%
  - Others: 6.7%

Population by age
  - 0 to 14: 15.3%
  - 15 to 64: 55.4%
  - 65 or older: 29.4%
- Time zone: UTC+02:00 (EET)
  - Summer (DST): UTC+03:00 (EEST)
- Website: www.kauhava.fi

Kauhava is a town and municipality of Finland. It is part of the South Ostrobothnia region, 400 kilometres (250 mi) northwest of Helsinki and by the main railway from Helsinki to Oulu. The town has a population of 14,909 (31 December 2025) and covers an area of 1,328.09 square kilometres (512.78 sq mi) of which 14.63 km^{2} (5.65 sq mi) is water. The population density is 11.35 inhabitants per square kilometre (29.4/sq mi).

The popular amusement park, PowerPark, is located in Alahärmä, Kauhava.

The municipality is unilingually Finnish.

== History ==
Kauhava was the home of the Finnish Training Air Wing from 1929 until the end of 2014.

The surrounding municipalities of Alahärmä, Kortesjärvi and Ylihärmä were consolidated with Kauhava on 1 January 2009.

== Geography ==
The surrounding country is flat and well suited for agriculture, alternating between fields and forests. The town probably takes its name from the small river which passes through it.

=== Climate ===
Climate data for Kauhava Airfield (1991–2020 normals, records 1959–present)
| Month | Jan | Feb | Mar | Apr | May | Jun | Jul | Aug | Sep | Oct | Nov | Dec | Year |
|---|---|---|---|---|---|---|---|---|---|---|---|---|---|
| Record high °C (°F) | 9.1 (48.4) | 9.3 (48.7) | 14.7 (58.5) | 24.4 (75.9) | 29.6 (85.3) | 32.4 (90.3) | 33.0 (91.4) | 31.1 (88.0) | 27.3 (81.1) | 20.0 (68.0) | 13.0 (55.4) | 8.6 (47.5) | 33.0 (91.4) |
| Mean daily maximum °C (°F) | −2.9 (26.8) | −3.0 (26.6) | 1.6 (34.9) | 8.1 (46.6) | 15.0 (59.0) | 19.4 (66.9) | 22.1 (71.8) | 20.2 (68.4) | 14.6 (58.3) | 7.2 (45.0) | 2.0 (35.6) | −1.0 (30.2) | 8.6 (47.5) |
| Daily mean °C (°F) | −6.3 (20.7) | −6.8 (19.8) | −2.9 (26.8) | 3.1 (37.6) | 9.1 (48.4) | 14.0 (57.2) | 16.6 (61.9) | 14.6 (58.3) | 9.7 (49.5) | 4.0 (39.2) | −0.4 (31.3) | −3.8 (25.2) | 4.2 (39.6) |
| Mean daily minimum °C (°F) | −10.2 (13.6) | −10.9 (12.4) | −7.3 (18.9) | −1.6 (29.1) | 3.0 (37.4) | 8.1 (46.6) | 11.0 (51.8) | 9.3 (48.7) | 5.2 (41.4) | 0.8 (33.4) | −3.0 (26.6) | −7.1 (19.2) | −0.2 (31.6) |
| Record low °C (°F) | −37.6 (−35.7) | −41.8 (−43.2) | −31.4 (−24.5) | −20.5 (−4.9) | −8.3 (17.1) | −3.1 (26.4) | −1.2 (29.8) | −3.1 (26.4) | −8.7 (16.3) | −22.6 (−8.7) | −29.3 (−20.7) | −37.2 (−35.0) | −41.8 (−43.2) |
| Average precipitation mm (inches) | 31 (1.2) | 27 (1.1) | 24 (0.9) | 26 (1.0) | 40 (1.6) | 59 (2.3) | 69 (2.7) | 63 (2.5) | 53 (2.1) | 54 (2.1) | 45 (1.8) | 38 (1.5) | 529 (20.8) |
| Average precipitation days | 9 | 8 | 7 | 6 | 7 | 9 | 10 | 10 | 8 | 10 | 10 | 10 | 104 |
| Average snowy days | 25.4 | 22.4 | 25.5 | 12.9 | 0.4 | 0.0 | 0.0 | 0.0 | 0.0 | 3.7 | 16.0 | 22.0 | 128.4 |
| Average relative humidity (%) | 90 | 88 | 80 | 72 | 66 | 68 | 74 | 79 | 84 | 89 | 92 | 92 | 81 |
Source: https://helda.helsinki.fi/handle/10138/336063 https://www.weatheronline.co.uk/Finland/Kauhava.htm https://kilotavu.com/asema-taulukko.php?asema=101503

== Knife making ==
Kauhava's former coat of arms

A traditional industry in Kauhava is knife making, and many Finns recognize the name of this small town because of knives made there. At one time, as many as five different knife-making enterprises were underway in the town, but today there is only one – Iisakki Järvenpää Oy, which has been making knives in Kauhava since 1879.

The puukko (one of the styles of Finnish knife) made in Kauhava are sometimes referred to as being in the Ostrobothnian style.

Each June sees the Kauhava International Knife Festival, lasting a couple of days and including knife exhibitions, knife making and knife throwing.

== Museums ==
As with many Finnish localities, there are museums in Kauhava (Kauhava-Seura). One in the center of town features both the knifemaking tradition as well as the local textiles. An out-of-place fishing lure is one interesting feature of this museum. Another museum on the outskirts of Kauhava features the 19th century home and farm of Iisakin Jussi. It provides a view of late 19th century life in Western Finland. The Iisakin Jussi House is not open during the winter months.

== International relations ==
=== Twin towns — Sister cities ===
Kauhava is twinned with:

- Rapla, Estonia
- Rygge, Norway
- Skærbæk, Denmark
- Vimmerby Municipality, Sweden
- Þorlákshöfn, Iceland

== Notable people ==
- Susanna Haapoja (1966–2009), politician
- Jussi Pernaa (born 1983), professional ice hockey player
- Antti Tuuri (born 1944), writer
- Kyösti Virrankoski (1944–2026), politician
- Raimo Vistbacka (born 1945), politician

== See also ==
- Finnish national road 19 – a highway passing through Kauhava
