= Nieuport-Delage NiD-120 =

French single-seat parasol monoplane fighter aircraft

NiD 120 Series
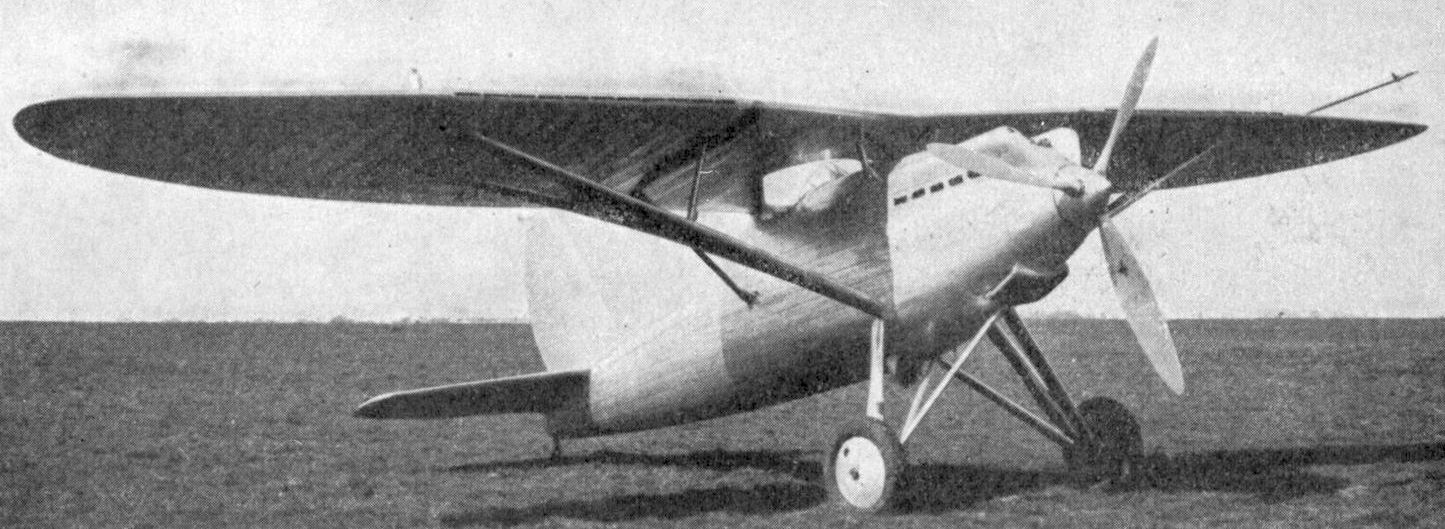
- Nieuport-Delage NiD 121 prototype

General information
- Type: Fighter
- National origin: France
- Manufacturer: Nieuport
- Primary user: Peru
- Number built: 17

History
- Manufactured: 1934–1935
- Introduction date: 1935
- First flight: 23 July 1932
- Retired: 1940

The Nieuport-Delage NiD 120 was a French single-seat parasol monoplane fighter aircraft built during the 1930s. It was built in several versions that were fitted with different engines. Rejected for service with the French Air Force (Armée de l'Air) after a fatal crash in 1933, only a dozen aircraft were built for the Peruvian Air Force (Cuerpo de Aviación del Perú). Deliveries began at the end of 1934, but the NiD 121s were only service for a few years before a crippling shortage of spare parts after the French aviation industry was nationalized after a series of strikes in 1936. The Peruvian Air Force had exhausted its inventory of spares by early 1939 and the surviving aircraft were scrapped in late 1940.

== Design and development ==
In 1930, the French Air Force issued a specification for an all-metal, single-seat fighter to be powered by a 650 hp (485 kW) engine and required to reach a speed of 350 km/h (217 mph) and a height of 9,000 m (29,500 ft). A total of 27 designs were offered by French manufacturers, of which 11 were selected for development to prototype status. Nieuport-Astra's design was a parasol monoplane with the wing mounted just above the fuselage on short cabane struts. It had a cutout immediately above the pilot's cockpit, allowing the pilot to raise his seat so that his head was just above the wing for a better upwards view. The engine was cooled using an unusual radiator built into the wing, where air was sucked in through slots in the leading edge of the wing and expelled through the trailing edge. A fixed tailwheel undercarriage was fitted. Two versions were proposed, one, the Nieuport-Delage NiD 121, powered by a Lorraine-Dietrich 12H water-cooled V12 engine and the other, the NiD 122, powered by a Hispano-Suiza 12X engine of similar layout.

First to fly on 23 July 1932 was the Hispano-powered NiD 122, piloted by Joseph Sadi-Lecointe, with the NiD 121 following on 25 November 1932. The NiD 122 was destroyed in a fatal crash on 13 April 1933 when severe wing flutter caused an aileron to break off while the aircraft was being demonstrated in front of representatives of the Parliament of France. Testing continued, with a second NiD 122 flying in July 1933. While performance was good, with the NiD 121 reaching 367 km/h (226 mph), it was criticised for a weak undercarriage while its novel radiator was considered vulnerable to damage in combat and the Dewoitine D.500 was selected instead.

After the start of the Colombia–Peru War in late 1932, the Peruvian Air Force sent a purchasing mission to France in search of modern fighters to counter the qualitative superiority of the Colombian Air Force. During a visit to the flight-testing center at Vélizy-Villacoublay Air Base in March 1933, the delegation was shown the NiD 121 prototype and agreed to place an order for 10 aircraft provided that the following changes were made: the prototype's 650-horsepower (480 kW) engine be replaced by the 12Hdrs model rated at 720 horsepower (540 kW), it was to be armed with 7.65-millimetre (0.301 in) machine guns, it had to be able to carry up to 120 kilograms (260 lb) of bombs and that it should be able to switch between its conventional landing gear and floats without loss of performance; however it does not appear that all of the conditions were met. Nieuport-Astra agree to make these modifications and offered to deliver 3 NiD 626s to the Peruvians while the company prepared to build the NiD 121s. After some delay the Peruvian Air Force rejected the proposal because the wooden structure of NiD 626 was unlikely to do well in the tropical climate, although it did increase the order of NiD 121s to a dozen aircraft. The company did build a NiD 123 floatplane with the 720-hp 12Hdrs engine and demonstrated it on 18 July 1934, but it was rejected as the Peruvians found its characteristics unsatisfactory.

A final version, the NiD 125, was built for evaluation by the French Air Force, featuring a more powerful Hispano-Suiza 12Y engine with provision for a 20 mm (0.8 in) cannon firing through the propeller hub, and with the wing-mounted radiators replaced by more conventional radiators mounted on the sides of the fuselage. The sole prototype flew in June 1934, but despite good performance, a similarly powered and armed version of the Dewoitine D.500, the D.510, was chosen for production.

== Operational history ==
Deliveries were made between December 1934 and February 1935, well after the end of the war, and five fighters were assigned to the 4th Mixed Squadron (4 Escuadrón Mixto) of the Third Aviation Squadron (III Escuadrón de Aviación (III EA)), based at Ancón. In mid-1935 the 4th Mixed Squadron was transferred to Las Palmas Air Base where it was merged into the newly formed 2nd Fighter Squadron (2 Escuadrón de Caza) assigned to the II EA with the rest of the NiD 121s. One aircraft was lost on 21 October 1936 when a fighter crashed after stalling during a dogfight over a hangar; the pilot was killed and two mechanics working in the hangar were badly injured. The unit was transferred to the newly built Capitán Guillermo Protset del Castillo Air Base in southern Peru in January 1936. The short-ranged NiD 121s could not reach the base directly so they flew to Ancón where their floats were installed and then staged via the ports of Pisco, San Juan de Marcona to Mollendo. There the aircraft were disassembled so they could be railed to Arequipa, where they were reassembled and flown to the air base.

After a series of general strikes of French industrial workers in 1936, the socialist Popular Front government decided to nationalize the French aviation industry, amalgamating them into seven large aircraft companies and another for engines. The combination of strikes and amalgamations disrupted production for months which crippled the delivery of spare parts for foreign customers. By the end of 1937, only a handful of NiD 121s were airworthy and appeals for spare parts had proved fruitless. A year later the lack of engine spares had caused the Peruvian Air Force to decide to retire the fighters; all of which had been grounded by early 1939. The surviving aircraft were scrapped in October 1940.

== Variants ==
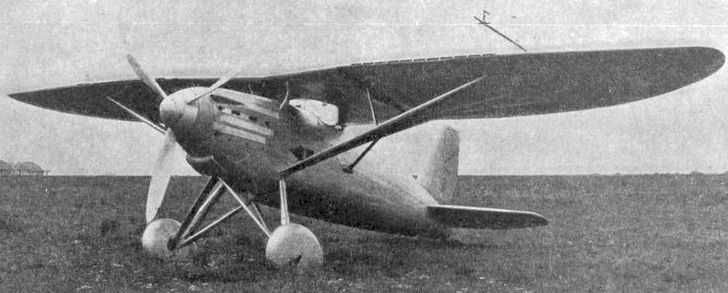
NiD 122 photo from L'Aerophile Salon 1932

Nieuport-Delage NiD 121

Powered by a 650 hp (480 kW) Lorraine-Dietrich 12H engine. One prototype plus a dozen production aircraft built.

Nieuport-Delage NiD 122

Powered by a 650 hp Hispano-Suiza 12Xbrs engine. Two prototypes built.

Nieuport-Delage NiD 123

Fighter for Peru with convertible wheel/float undercarriage, powered by 720 hp (537 kW) Lorraine-Detrich 12Hdrs engine. One prototype built.

Nieuport-Delage NiD 125

Improved fighter with 860 hp (642 kW) Hispano-Suiza 12Ycrs engine and revised cooling system. Reached 400 km/h (248 mph) during testing. One built.

== Operators ==
Peru

- Peruvian Air Force - The 12 production NiD 121s were delivered to Peru in 1934–1935.

== Specifications (NiD 121C1) ==
Data from The Complete Book of Fighters; Wings over Peru: The Nieuport-Delage 121C1 in Cuerpo de Aviación del Perú Service

General characteristics

- Crew: one
- Length: 7.18 m (23 ft 7 in)
- Wingspan: 13.0 m (42 ft 8 in)
- Height: 3.02 m (9 ft 11 in)
- Wing area: 22.0 m^{2} (237 sq ft)
- Empty weight: 1,433 kg (3,159 lb)
- Gross weight: 2,000 kg (4,409 lb)
- Powerplant: 1 × Lorraine 12Hars liquid-cooled V12 engine, 480 kW (650 hp)

Performance

- Maximum speed: 368 km/h (229 mph, 199 kn)
- Range: 800 km (500 mi, 430 nmi)
- Service ceiling: 9,900 m (32,500 ft)

Armament

- Guns: 2 × 7.65 mm (0.30 in) machine guns
- Bombs: 120 kg (260 lb)

== See also ==
Related lists

- List of Interwar military aircraft
