= Loire-Nieuport LN.401 =

Family of French naval dive-bombers

LN.401
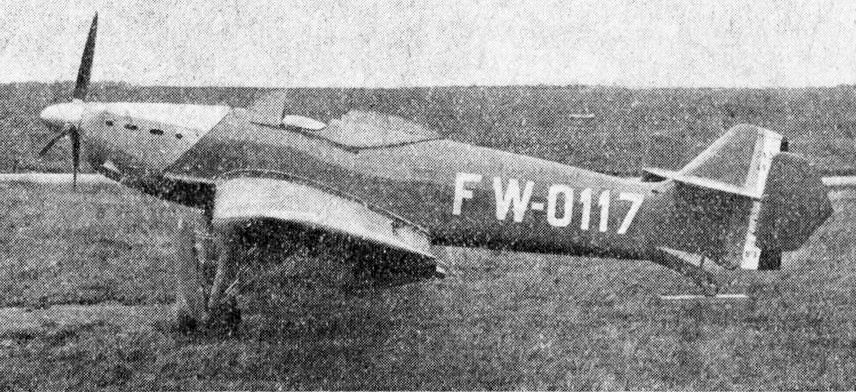
- A Loire-Nieuport LN.40

General information
- Type: dive bomber
- Manufacturer: SNCAO
- Primary user: French Navy
- Number built: 68

History
- Manufactured: 1938–1942
- Introduction date: 1939
- First flight: 6 July 1938
- Retired: 1940

The Loire-Nieuport LN.40 aircraft were a family of French naval dive-bombers for the Aeronavale in the late 1930s, which saw service during World War II.

== Design and development ==
Between 1932 and 1936, Nieuport-Delage had been developing a two-seat dive bomber, the Nieuport Ni.140, for the Aéronautique Navale, the aviation arm of the French Navy. It was renamed Loire-Nieuport LN.140 after the Nieuport company was absorbed into Loire-Nieuport, in 1933. The first of two prototypes, the LN.140-01, was flown on 12 March 1935, but had crashed in July during a forced landing, not being repaired. Flight testing continued with the second prototype, the LN.140-02, until development was abandoned after, that too, crashed in July 1936.

Development efforts were then concentrated on the LN.40 project which benefited from experience with the LN.140, but was a new, and aerodynamically more refined design, replacing the fixed and spatted undercarriage of the LN.140 with rearward retracting main gear legs, and dispensing with the second crewman. In the second half of 1937 an order was received for a prototype, followed by orders for seven production aircraft for the aircraft carrier Béarn and three more for operational evaluation by the air force. The French Air Force had expressed interest in a land-based derivative of the LN.40, designated the LN.41. Initial plans were for 184 to equip six dive bomber squadrons with 18 aircraft each, plus reserves.

The prototype made its first flight on 6 July 1938, the second followed in January 1939, and the third in May. Four of the pre-series LN.40 dive bombers were delivered in July, and it passed its carrier trials aboard the aircraft carrier Béarn. Nevertheless, the flight tests found that the dive brakes were ineffective, which led to their being removed in favour of using the extended landing gear doors as air brakes. The LN.40 also could not carry out diving attacks with full fuel tanks. The aircraft was too slow for the air force which requested the development of a faster dive bomber, which would become the Loire-Nieuport LN.42.

In July 1939, Loire-Nieuport had received orders for 36 LN.401 production dive bombers for the Navy, and 36 LN.411 aircraft for the Army. The LN.411 was almost identical to the LN.401, except for the deletion of the arrestor hook, the wing folding mechanism and the emergency floatation devices. The first LN.411s were delivered in September which coincided with an order from the air force for 270 more but in October they were refused, and the LN.411s were sent to the Navy.

Loire-Nieuport also attempted to develop a faster version, by substituting an 860 hp (640 kW) Hispano-Suiza 12Y-31 for the 690 hp (510 kW) Hispano-Suiza 12Xcrs engine of the LN.401. This LN.402 made its first flight on 18 November 1939. Further development of the LN.402 was prevented by the French defeat in May 1940 and the following armistice.

The final development was the LN.42 dispensed with the inverted gull wing and elevator endplates and used the much more powerful 1,100 hp (820 kW) Hispano-Suiza 12Y-51 engine but was too late for the Second World War, making only a few short hops before France fell during the 1940 invasion of France when it was hidden from the Germans for the duration of the war. Flight trials resumed on 24 August 1945 and ran until 1947, however no interest was forthcoming of the now obsolete type and only one example was built.

== Operational history ==
Two escadrilles of the Aéronautique Navale, designated as AB2 and AB4, converted to the LN.401/411 between late 1939 and early 1940. AB2 received its first LN.401 dive bombers in November 1939, while AB4 received the LN.411 dive bombers rejected by the Air Force from February 1940 onwards. The dive bombers rejected by the Air Force were a welcome reinforcement to the Navy, as the production of the LN.401 was very slow.

Both used the type in combat during the Battle of France in ground attacks against German motorized columns and troop concentrations. Losses were heavy. One attack on 19 May resulted in the loss of 10 out of 20 dive bombers committed, while seven of the survivors were sufficiently damaged to be no longer airworthy. The production rate of the LN.401 and LN.411 was insufficient to replace losses, and in about a month of fighting the two squadrons lost two-thirds of their strength.

After the armistice with Germany, AB2 and AB4 were ordered to evacuate to Bône in Algeria, Two LN.411s force landed in southern Sardinia during the flight to Algeria, with one of them restored to airworthy condition and evaluated by the Italians. On arrival in Algeria, the remaining Loire-Nieuport dive bombers were dismantled and placed in storage and the two escadrilles were renamed 2AB and 4AB and re-equipped with the Glenn-Martin 167-F level bomber.

== Variants ==
Nieuport Ni.140
Original Nieuport design first flown on 12 March 1935. Renamed Loire-Nieuport LN.140 after the merger of Loire and Nieuport. Both prototypes lost by July 1936, when efforts were transferred to the improved LN.40.
LN.40
Pre-production aircraft. Seven built.
LN.41
Proposed land based LN.40
LN.401
Production single-seat carrier-based dive bomber. 15 built.
LN.411
Land-based 401, with naval equipment removed; 45 built.
LN.402
One example fitted with a 860 hp (640 kW) Hispano-Suiza 12Y-31 engine.
LN.42
1940 development which dispensed with the inverted gull wing. Sole example used a 1,100 hp (820 kW) Hispano-Suiza 12Y-51 engine.

== Operators ==
France

- French Navy
- French Air Force
- Vichy French Air Force

== Specifications (LN.401) ==
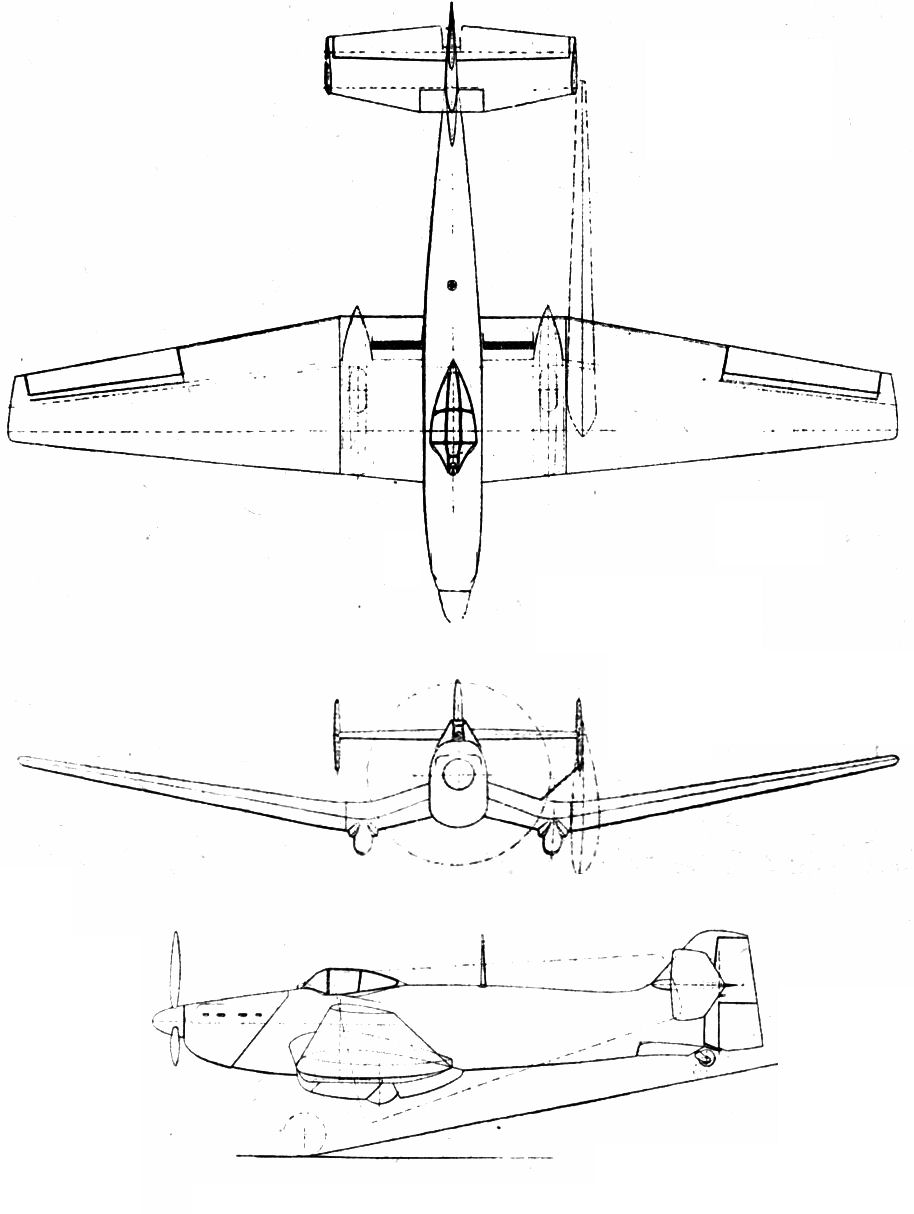
Loire Nieuport LN-40 3-view drawing from L'Aerophile August 1943

Data from War Planes of the Second World War: Volume Eight Bombers and Reconnaissance Aircraft

General characteristics

- Crew: 1
- Length: 9.75 m (32 ft 0 in)
- Wingspan: 14 m (45 ft 11 in)
- Height: 3.5 m (11 ft 6 in)
- Wing area: 24.75 m^{2} (266.4 sq ft)
- Empty weight: 2,243 kg (4,945 lb)
- Gross weight: 2,835 kg (6,250 lb)
- Powerplant: 1 × Hispano-Suiza 12Xcrs V-12 liquid-cooled piston engine, 510 kW (690 hp) at 4,000 m (13,000 ft)

Performance

- Maximum speed: 380 km/h (240 mph, 210 kn) at 4,000 m (13,000 ft)
- Cruise speed: 299 km/h (186 mph, 161 kn) (economical cruise)
- Range: 1,200 km (750 mi, 650 nmi)
- Service ceiling: 9,500 m (31,200 ft)

Armament

- Guns: 1 × Hispano-Suiza HS.404 20 mm (0.787 in) cannon and 2 × 7.5 mm (0.295 in) Darne machine guns
- Bombs: 1 × 225 kg (496 lb) or 165 kg (364 lb) bomb, or 10 × 10 kg (22 lb) or 15 kg (33 lb) bombs

== See also ==
Related development

- Loire-Nieuport LN.161

Aircraft of comparable role, configuration, and era

- Aichi D3A
- Blackburn Skua
- Breda Ba.201
- Junkers Ju 87
- Northrop BT
- Naval Aircraft Factory SBN
- Vought SB2U Vindicator

Related lists

- List of bomber aircraft
- List of aircraft of World War II
- List of aircraft of the French Air Force during World War II
