= SNCAO 200 =

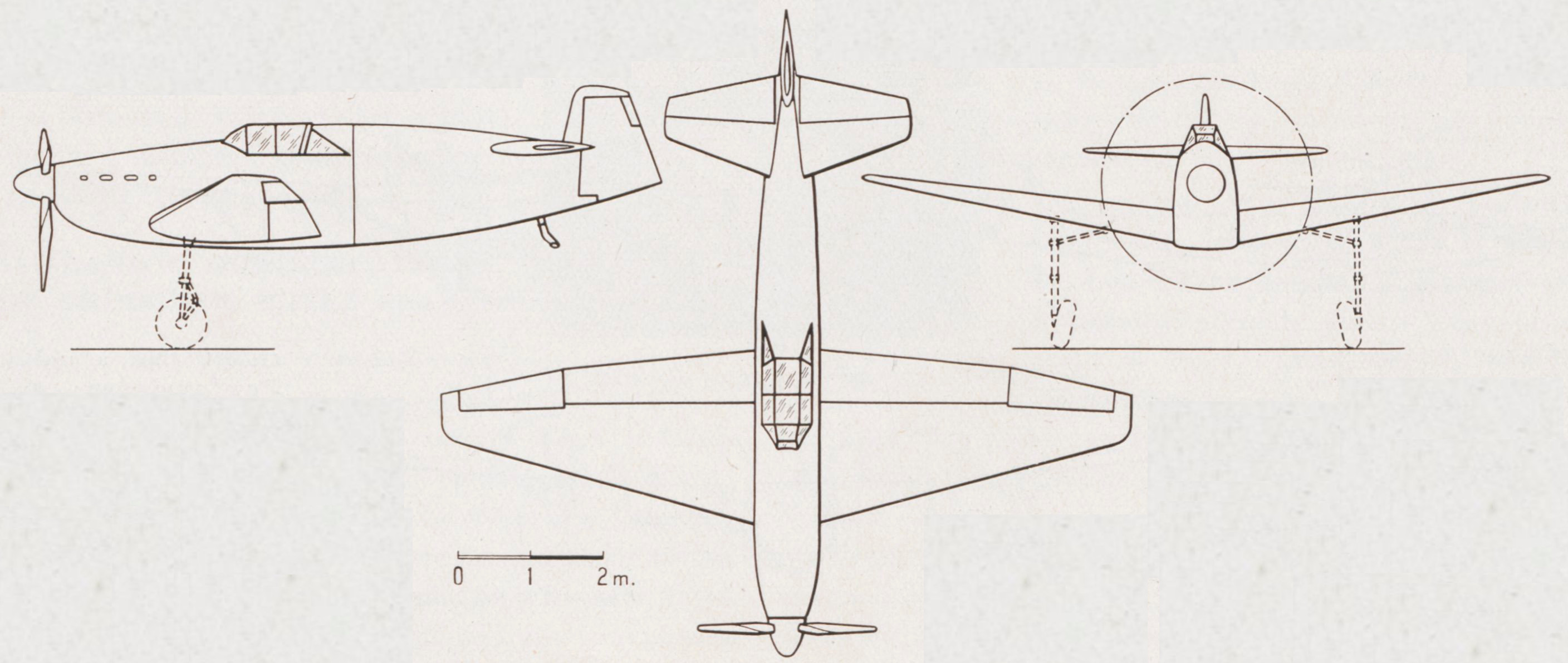
- 3-views of the SNCAO 200

General information
- Type: Fighter aircraft
- National origin: France
- Manufacturer: SNCAO
- Number built: 1

History
- First flight: 31 January 1939

The SNCAO 200, sometimes written as CAO.200, was a French single-seat fighter aircraft prototype of the 1930s. It was a single-engined monoplane intended to compete with the Dewoitine D.520, but it was unsuccessful, and only one was built.

== Design and development ==
In 1937, the French Air Ministry issued an official specification for a single-engined fighter to follow-on from and replace the Morane-Saulnier M.S.406. The new fighter was to be powered by a single Hispano-Suiza 12Y-51, rated at 1,100 hp (821 kW). Designs to meet this specification were produced by Dewoitine (the Dewoitine D.520), Morane-Saulnier (the Morane-Saulnier M.S.450), the Arsenal de l'Aéronautique (the VG-33) and SNCAO.

SNCAO, formed in 1936 when the factories of Loire-Nieuport and Breguet were nationalised, based its design on the Loire-Nieuport 161 fighter design which had been rejected in favour of the M.S.406. The new fighter, the SNCAO 200 was a low-winged monoplane of all-metal construction, with stressed-skin wings, a forward fuselage of steel tubes covered in duralumin skinning, and a duralumin monocoque rear fuselage. It was fitted with leading edge slats, which were linked to trailing edge flaps.

A mock-up of the SNCAO was exhibited at the 1938 Paris Air Show. When the prototype was completed in January 1939, the planned Hispano-Suiza 12Y-51 engine was not yet available, and it was fitted with an 860 hp (640 kW) Hispano-Suiza 12Y-31 engine to make its first flight on 31 January 1939. With this engine, the SNCAO was underpowered, and by the time the prototype was passed to the authorities for official testing in August 1939, the Dewoitine D.520 had already been ordered into large-scale production. Despite this, several sources claim that a batch of 12 aircraft to be powered by 12Y-51 engines were ordered. (Note: Green and Swanborough, however, in the Complete Book of Fighters state that the often claimed order for 12 pre-production aircraft, and the use of the prototype in combat has "no foundation in fact".)

== Operational history ==
During the Battle of France, the prototype SNCAO 200 may have been used to defend the SNCAO factory at Villacoublay, and may even have shot down an attacking Heinkel He 111 bomber. The prototype was taken to Germany for evaluation following the 22 June Armistice between France and Germany.

== Specifications ==
Data from The Complete Book of Fighters

General characteristics

- Crew: 1
- Length: 8.90 m (29 ft 2 in)
- Wingspan: 9.50 m (31 ft 2 in)
- Height: 3.50 m (11 ft 6 in)
- Wing area: 13.30 m^{2} (143.2 sq ft)
- Gross weight: 2,500 kg (5,512 lb)
- Powerplant: 1 × Hispano-Suiza 12Y-51 liquid-cooled V12 engine, 640 kW (860 hp)

Performance

- Maximum speed: 550 km/h (340 mph, 300 kn) at 6,000 m (19,700 ft)
- Endurance: 2 hours
- Service ceiling: 4,480 m (14,700 ft)
- Time to altitude: 2 min 27 sec to 2,000 m (6,600 ft)

Armament

- Guns: 1 × 20 mm Hispano-Suiza HS.404 cannon firing through propeller hub, 2 × 7.5 mm MAC 1934 machine guns in wings
