= Fliegerstaffel 20 =

Fliegerstaffel 20 20ème Escadrille Squadriglia d'aviazione 20
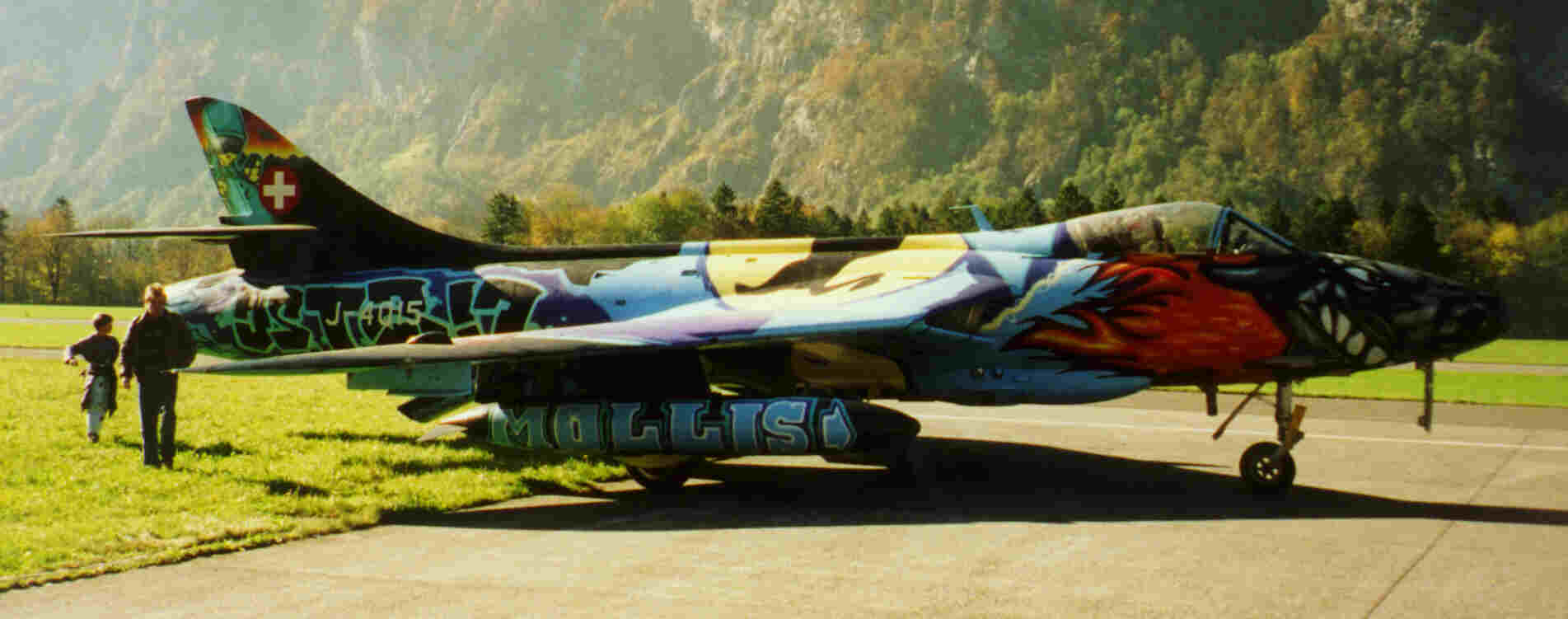
- Hawker Hunter of Fliegerstaffel 20
- Active: 1938–1994
- Country: Switzerland
- Branch: Swiss Air Force
- Role: Fighter squadron
- Garrison/HQ: military airfield at Mollis

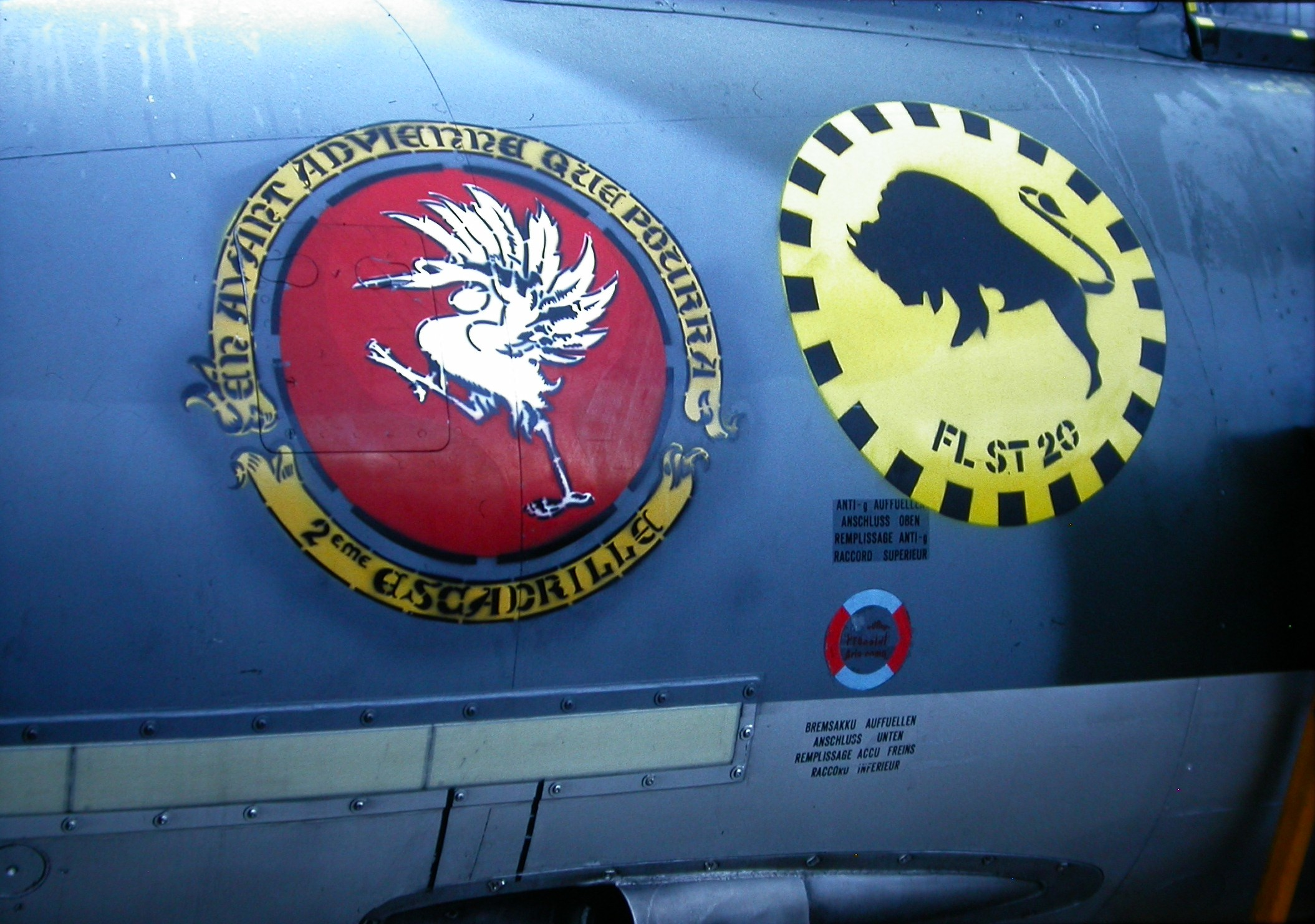
badge of the Fliegerstaffel 2 (left) and of the Fliegerstaffel 20 (right)

Fliegerstaffel 20 was a Swiss Air Force squadron equipped with Hawker Hunter aircraft. Their home base at the dissolution was the military airfield at Mollis. The squadron carried as its coat of arms a black Bison on a yellow background. The writing “Fl St 20” below the Bison appeared during the squadron's history.

== History ==
The unit's roots date back to 1938, when Fliegerkompanie 20 was founded. On September 2, 1939, the military airfield Mollis became the home base of the unit. It had nine reconnaissance aircraft C-35s. In 1940 the Fl Kp 20 was upgraded to D-3800 Morane aircraft. In 1946, the Fliegerkompanie units were split up into pilots and ground crew groups, which resulted in the foundation of Fliegerstaffel 20. In 1948, the squadron got the P-51 Mustang, followed by the jet combat aircraft DH-100 Vampire in 1956. Only a year later, in 1957, the retraining to the aircraft type DH-112 Venom was completed. On August 27, 1962, the Fliegerstaffel 20 had a serious disaster. Three DH-112 Venom of the Fliegerstaffel 20 collided in the clouds near the Furka Pass, at the southern and nord Ridge of the Blauberg, when they tried to fly into the Rhone Valley in the course of maneuvers of the No 3 Swiss Mountain Corps.

In 1979, the Fliegerstaffel 20 changed to the Hawker Hunter. The flight operations on their war airfield at Mollis were usually carried out from Hardened aircraft shelters. As it was a militia squadron, the pilots would fly also from most other Swiss air fields during training courses, while Mollis was active only a few weeks each year.

In 1994, the Fliegerstaffel 20 was disbanded. The Hawker Hunter with the Aircraft registration J-4015 was decorated as Graffiti Hunter in September 1994 and is preserved by an association founded in Mollis.

== Airplanes ==
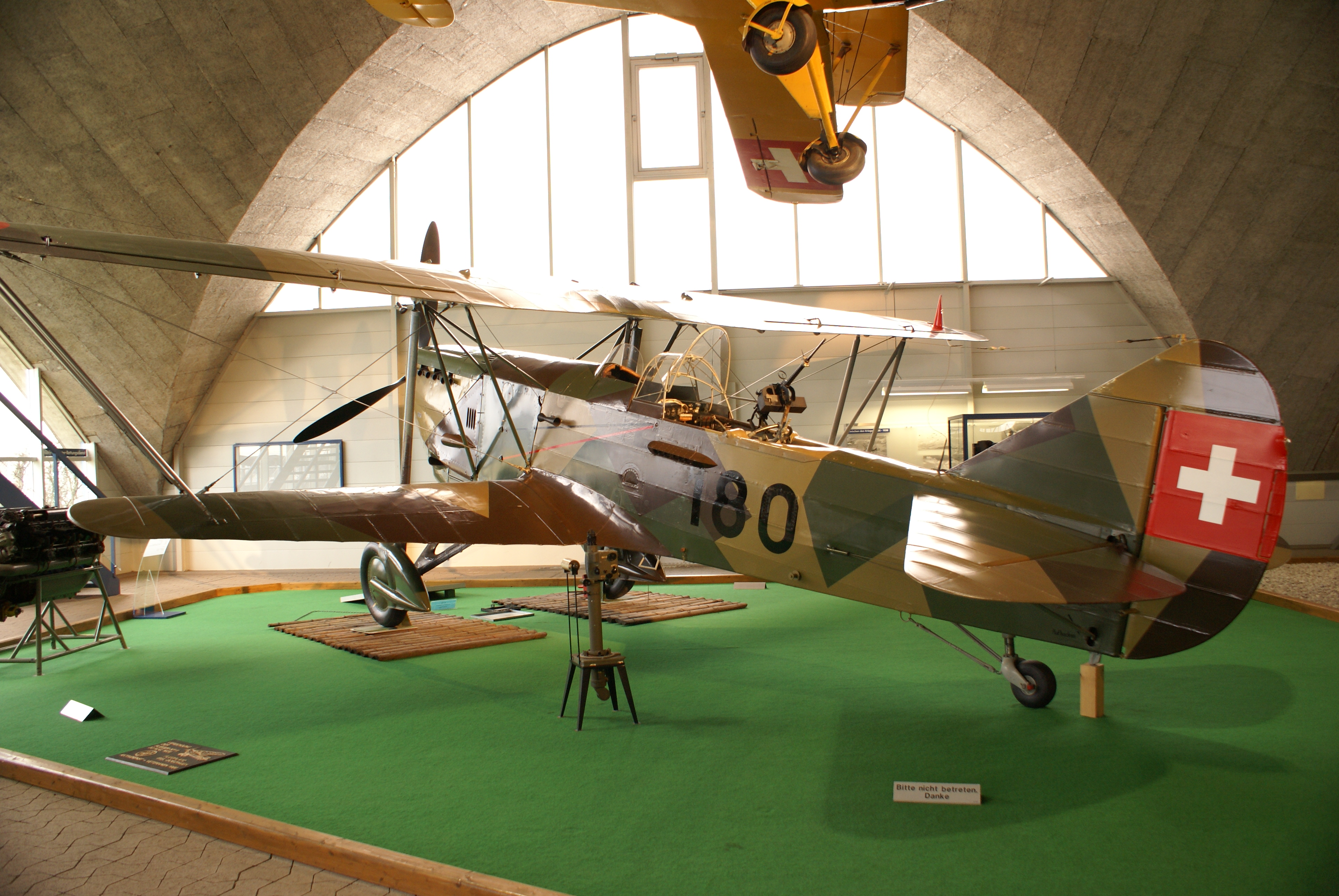
EKW C-35

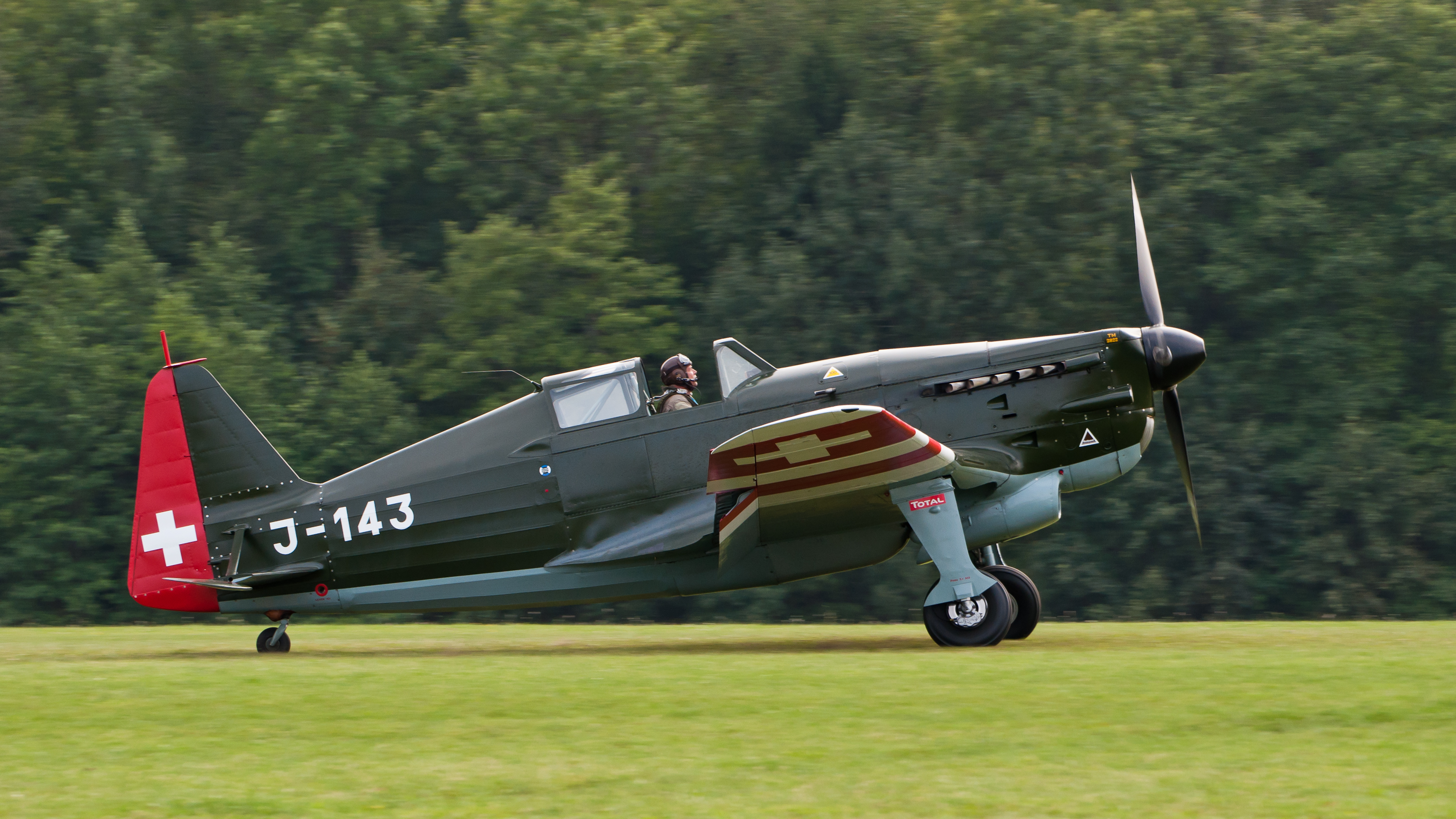
Morane D-3801

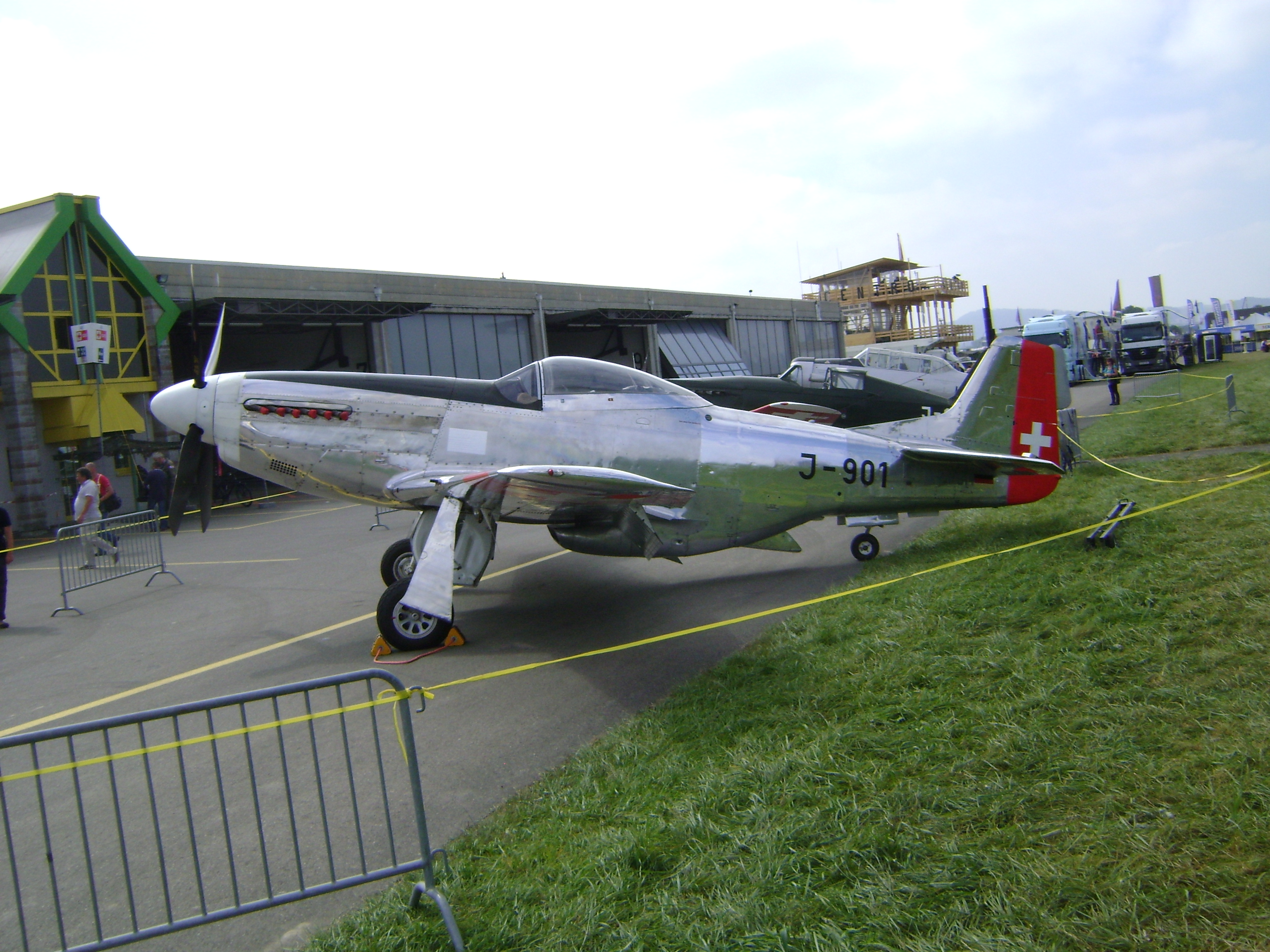
P-51 Mustang

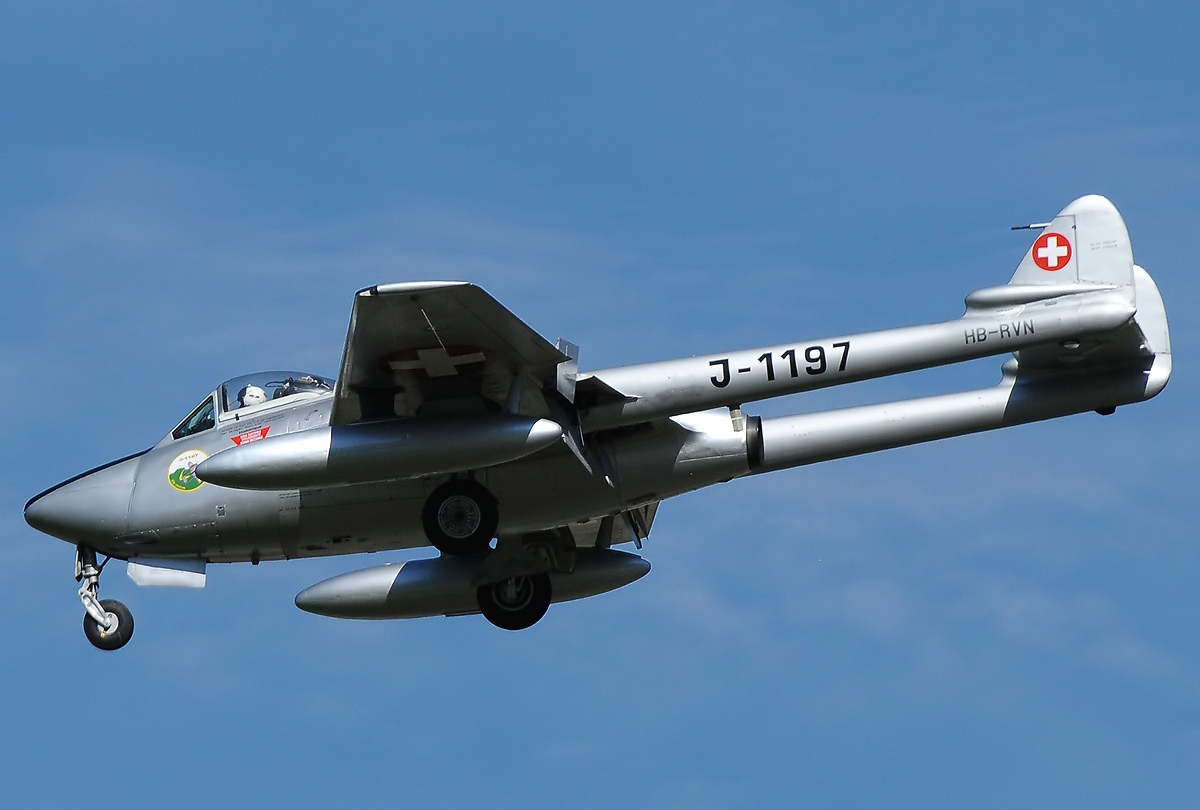
de Havilland Vampire

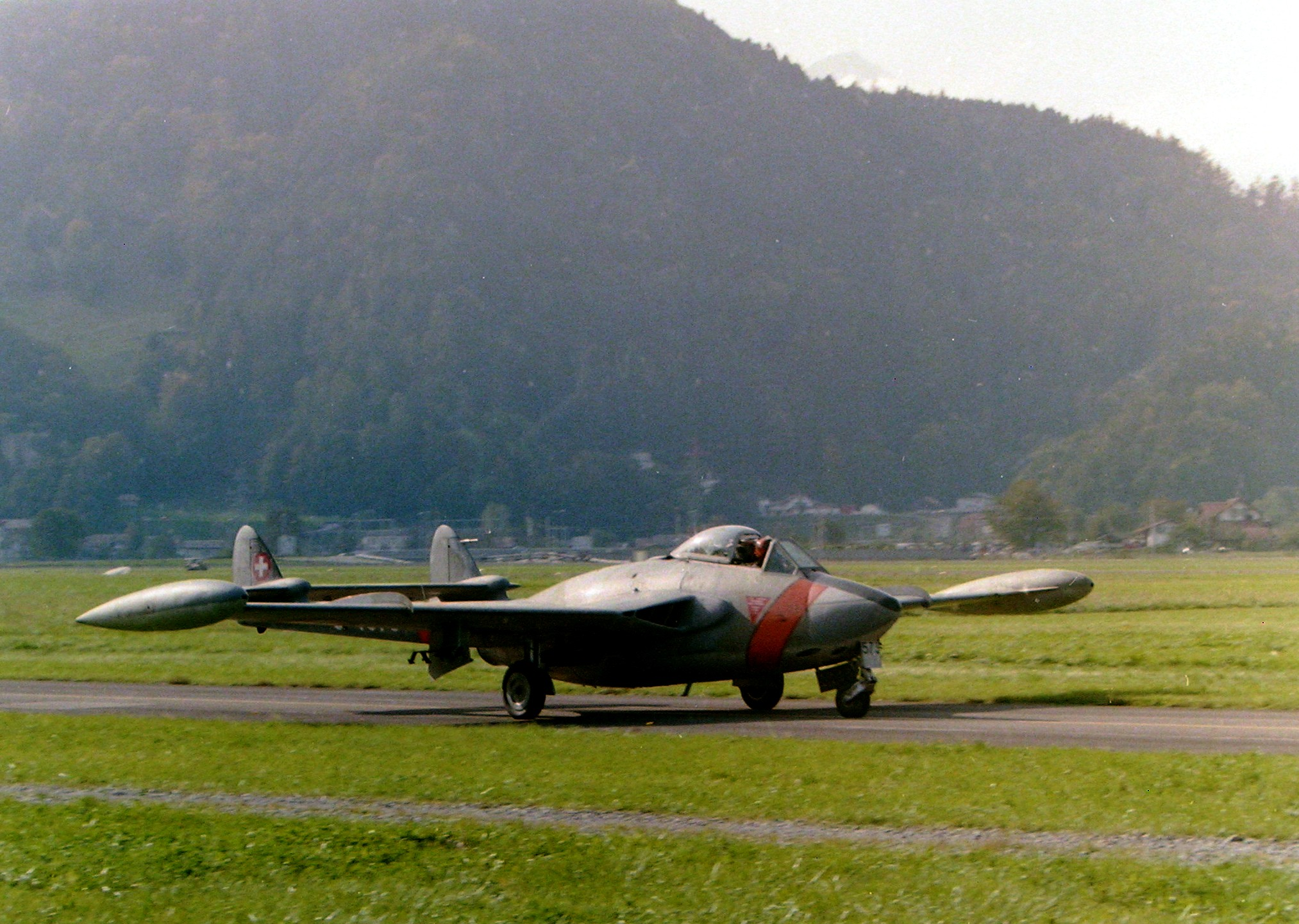
de Havilland Venom

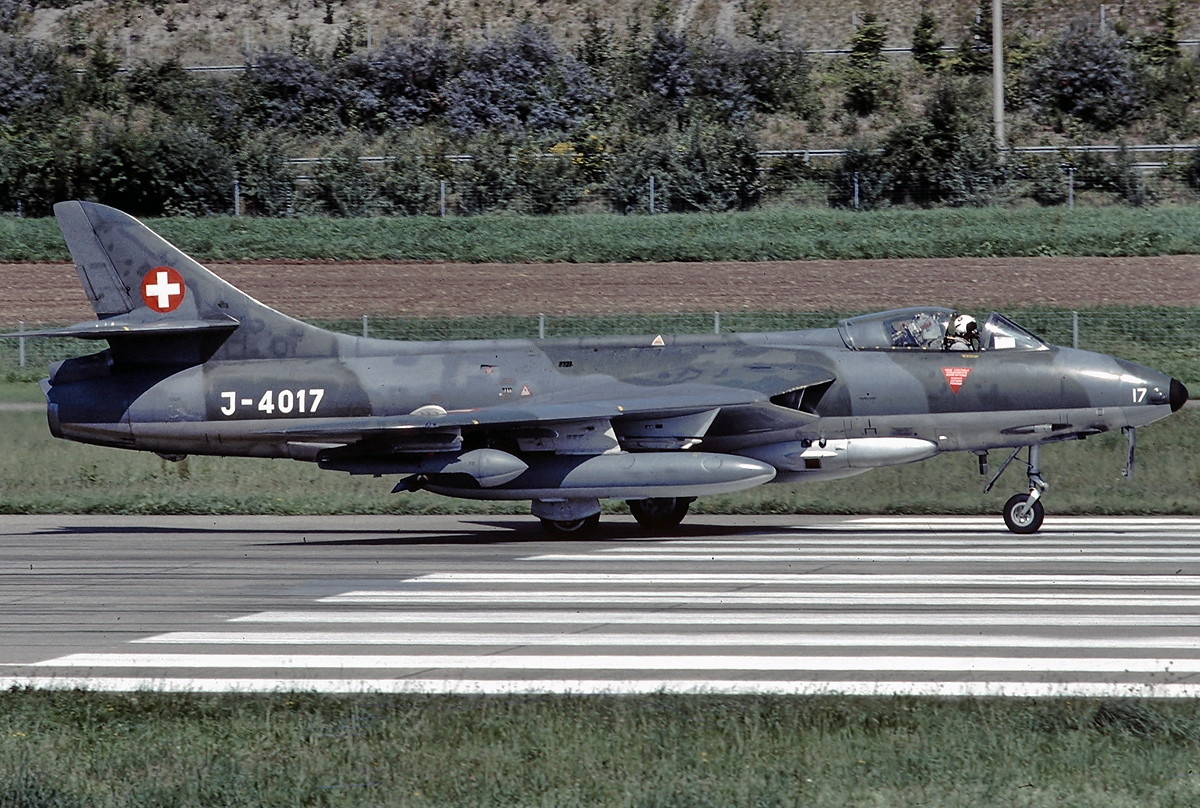
Hawker Hunter
