= Bernard 260 =

French all-metal, single-engine, low-wing monoplane

Bernard 260 C1

General information
- Type: Single seat fighter
- National origin: France
- Manufacturer: Société des Avions Bernard (S.A.B.)
- Designer: Sigismond-Georges Bruner
- Number built: 2 (1 flown)

History
- First flight: September 1932

The Bernard 260 C1 was a French all-metal, single-engine, low-wing monoplane with an open cockpit and fixed undercarriage, designed to a government single-seat fighter specification issued in 1930. After extensive comparative tests the Dewoitine D.500 was ordered in preference, though the performances of the two aircraft were similar.

== Design and development ==
The Bernard 260 C1 (C for Chasse or fighter, 1 stating single seat) was the last of a long line of Bernard fighters to fly. It was built, along with about nine different designs from other manufacturers, to a 1930 government C1 specification calling for a maximum speeds of 325 km/h (202 mph) at 3,500 m (11,500 ft) and 300 km/h (190 mph) at 6,000 m (20,000 ft). Landing speeds had to be less than 100 km/h (62 mph). In 1931 it further specified an increased specific static strength and raised all speeds by 25 km/h (16 mph) if a supercharger was fitted. A final amendment, made in 1932, was that supercharging was obligatory and that the fighter should be armed with four machine guns or two cannon or one cannon with two machine guns.

The 260 was the most advanced aircraft of the group of prototypes, equipped with almost full-span Handley Page slots as well as flaps on its low cantilever wing. The wing plan was straight edge and square tipped, with most of the taper on the trailing edge, its whole span occupied by ailerons and flaps which could be lowered together. The wing had a duralumin structure with a riveted metal skin. The tail surfaces had swept, almost straight leading edges, rounded tips and unswept trailing edges on the unbalanced control surfaces. The fuselage was built from two metal half-ovals joined vertically, with a riveted skin. The open cockpit was placed at the wing trailing edge, the fuselage tapering behind it. Each wheel of the 260's fixed, tailwheel undercarriage was mounted on a vertical, faired main leg, with a second strut behind forming a V and a third inboard to the fuselage underside. At the time of the first flight the wheels were enclosed in fairings but these had been removed by October 1932. Two cannons were fitted to the wing undersides, firing outside the propeller arc.

The Bernard 260 was powered by a 515 kW (691 hp) Hispano-Suiza 12Xbrs liquid cooled upright V-12 engine. Several different radiator arrangements were tried. For the first flight, made by Roger Baptiste in September 1932, a boxed chin radiator was used but was soon replaced by a pair of vertical units attached to the undercarriage legs. By November these had been replaced with a curved, open radiator under the engine, followed by yet another unsatisfactory system in January 1933. In March a retractable Villard-Ferlay radiator was fitted; this was used in the competitive tests.

In March 1933 the 260 was fitted with a sliding glass canopy, but the military feared the rear view would be lost and it was quickly removed. The height of the fin was increased to improve stall recovery. In June the slats were modified to open automatically. After losing its propeller in flight in July the 260, which landed safely, was significantly modified. The span was reduced by 1.25 m (4 ft 1 in) and a final radiator change was made. This involved an almost circular unit in front of the engine, with the propeller shaft emerging through it, above the centre. As a result, the profile of the nose was considerably altered, appearing less streamlined. At about the same time, the 260 regained its wheel fairings. It first flew in this form on 4 October 1933.

The Bernard 260 flew for more than 100 hours and made several hundred takeoffs and landings at the military test centre at Villacoublay but, in the end, no contract was awarded. Instead, the Dewoitine D.500 was put into production. Bernard were told that the reasons they failed were the difficulties encountered with the cooling system, the weight penalty of the slots and the difficulty of deploying them in manoeuvres and the lower rate of climb, the 260 taking about 10% longer to reach 3,000 m (9,800 ft) than the Dewoitine. They were also concerned by the "chaotic" state of Bernard's management structure. Which of the two aircraft was faster in level flight depended on altitude; the Bernard was faster at height down to less than 5,000 m (16,000 ft), for example by 9 km/h (5.6 mph) at 6,500 m (21,300 ft), but at sea level the Dewoitine was quicker by 6 km/h (3.7 mph). The Bernard could take off in 140 m (460 ft) and land in 180 m (590 ft).

The end of the 260 programme also finished two proposed developments: the 261, which would have had the more powerful, 642 kW (861 hp), Hispano-Suiza 12Ybrs and a retractable undercarriage and the 262, a carrier-borne fighter with arrestor hook etc. Only the 261 reached the construction stage.

== Variants ==
260
Only variant built and flown.
261
Powered by 642 kW (861 hp) Hispano-Suiza 12Ybrs. Retractable undercarriage. Built, or at least begun, but not flown.
262
Proposed carrier-borne variant, not built.

== Specifications (Bernard 260) ==
Data from

General characteristics

- Crew: 1
- Length: 7.80 m (25 ft 7 in)
- Wingspan: 12.55 m (41 ft 2 in)
- Height: 3.90 m (12 ft 10 in)
- Wing area: 18.20 m^{2} (195.9 sq ft)
- Empty weight: 1,357 kg (2,992 lb)
- Gross weight: 1,868 kg (4,118 lb)
- Powerplant: 1 × Hispano-Suiza 12Xbrs upright V-12, water cooled, 510 kW (690 hp)
- Propellers: 2-bladed Ratier, metal, fixed pitch

Performance

- Maximum speed: 376 km/h (234 mph, 203 kn)
- Range: 800 km (500 mi, 430 nmi)
- Service ceiling: 10,260 m (33,660 ft)
- Time to altitude: 4 min 20 s to 3,000 m (9,840 m)

Armament

- Guns: 2 underwing cannon

== Bibliography ==
- Liron, Jean (1990). Les avions Bernard. Collection Docavia. Vol. 31. Paris: Éditions Larivière. ISBN 2-84890-065-2.
