= Dewoitine D.770 =

D.770

General information
- Type: Attack aircraft
- National origin: France
- Manufacturer: SNCAM
- Number built: 2

History
- First flight: 27 June 1939

The Dewoitine D.770 was a prototype French twin-engined attack aircraft of the late 1930s. It was intended as a replacement for the Breguet 693 but testing was incomplete by the time that of the Franco-German Armistice, and no production followed.

== Design and development ==
In August 1937, the Service Technique de l'Aeronautique (or French Air Ministry) released a specification for a light attack bomber. The Société nationale des constructions aéronautiques du Midi (SNCAM), the nationalised Dewoitine company, proposed a three-seater twin-engined aircraft to meet this requirement, with two prototypes being ordered, with the Dewoitine D.770 to be powered by two Hispano-Suiza 12Y V12 engines and the Dewoitine D.771 to be powered by two Gnome-Rhône 14N radial engines but otherwise similar to the D.770. In the meantime, it was decided to adapt the Breguet 690 twin-engined fighter aircraft to an attack aircraft, with 200 Breguet 691 attack aircraft ordered in June 1938.

The prototype D.770 was completed at SNCAM's Toulouse factory in the spring of 1939. It was a mid-winged cantilever monoplane of stressed skin all-metal construction, with a monocoque fuselage and a retractable tailwheel undercarriage. A 20-mm cannon and two 7.5 mm machine guns were mounted in the aircraft's nose, and could be depressed to an angle of -15 degrees aimed by the pilot. A single machine gun was flexibly mounted in the dorsal position, with two more machine guns in a ventral position, while eight 50 kg (110 lb) bombs could be carried in a bomb-bay. The crew of three were protected by 150 kg (331 lb) of armour.

The D.770 made its maiden flight on 27 June 1939, flown by test pilot Marcel Doret. While the aircraft demonstrated good speed, it suffered from engine cooling problems and poor stability, and testing was slow, and was not complete in June 1940 when the Franco-German Armistice occurred resulting in the test programme being abandoned. Although the D.771 was completed in December 1939, it never flew, as the French Air Force by now preferred the larger and more capable Bloch 175 and SNCAM were busy with the more urgent Dewoitine D.520 fighter. Both prototypes were scrapped in 1941.

== Specifications (D.770) ==
Data from War Planes of the Second World War: Volume Eight Bombers and Reconnaissance Aircraft

General characteristics

- Crew: 3
- Length: 9.747 m (31 ft 11 3/4 in)
- Wingspan: 15.202 m (49 ft 10 1/2 in)
- Height: 3.23 m (10 ft 7 in)
- Wing area: 29.81 m^{2} (320.9 sq ft)
- Airfoil: NACA 23015
- Empty weight: 3,998 kg (8,814 lb) (without armour or armament)
- Max takeoff weight: 6,102 kg (13,453 lb)
- Powerplant: 2 × Hispano-Suiza 12YJrs liquid-cooled V12 engine, 780 kW (1,050 hp) each (take-off rating)

Performance

- Maximum speed: 502 km/h (312 mph, 271 kn) at 3,200 m (10,500 ft)
- Service ceiling: 8,300 m (27,230 ft)

Armament

- Guns:
  - 1 × forward firing 20 mm Hispano-Suiza HS.404 and 2 × 7.5 mm MAC 1934 machine guns in nose
  - 1 × 7.5 mm MAC 1934 machine gun in dorsal position
  - 2 × 7.5 mm MAC 1934 machine guns in ventral position
- Bombs: 8 × 50 kg (110 lb) bombs
