= Dewoitine D.513 =

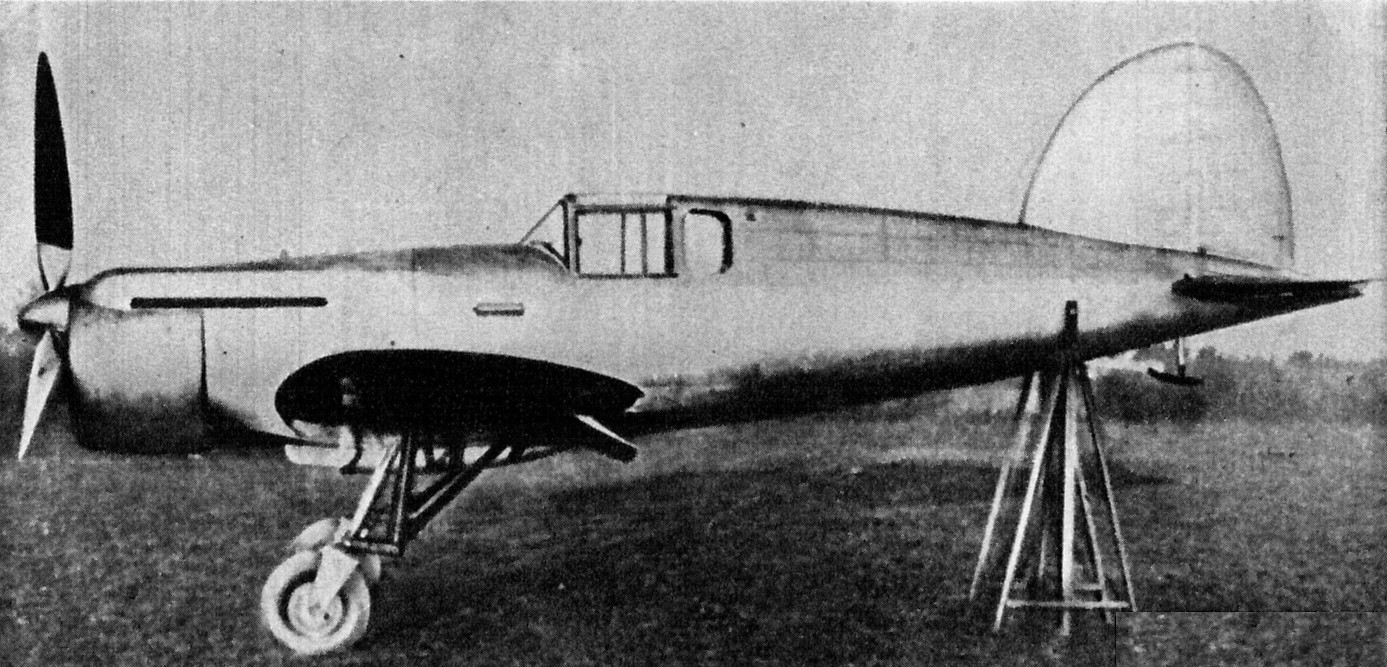

General information
- Type: Fighter aircraft
- Manufacturer: Dewoitine
- Status: Retired
- Primary user: French Air Force
- Number built: 2

History
- First flight: 6 January 1936

The Dewoitine D.513 was a 1930s prototype French monoplane fighter designed and built by Dewoitine.

== Development ==
The D.513 was a single-seat low-wing cantilever monoplane fighter that first flew on 6 January 1936. The D.513 was powered by an 860 hp (641 kW) Hispano-Suiza 12Ycrs1 V-12 piston engine and had a retractable tailwheel landing gear. Testing proved that the D.513 was unstable and not able to reach the expected speeds and it was rebuilt with a new fuselage and a modified tail unit. The changes did not improve the stability or the maximum speed and problems were also found in the engine cooling and landing gear, and further development was halted. The second prototype was modified with landing gear and a radiator from the D.503. It was redesignated the D.514LP and was used in high-speed parachute trials.

== Variants ==
D.513
Prototype with an 860 hp (641kW) Hispano-Suiza 12Ycrs1 V-12 piston engine.
D.514
Originally intended as the second D.513, it was modified for trials including the fitting of a Hispano-Suiza 12Ydrs2 V-12 engine.

== Operators ==
France

- French Air Force

== Specifications (D.513 revised) ==
Data from

General characteristics

- Crew: 1
- Length: 7.45 m (24 ft 5 in)
- Wingspan: 12.05 m (39 ft 6 in)
- Wing area: 18.32 m^{2} (197.2 sq ft)
- Max takeoff weight: 2,446 kg (5,393 lb)
- Powerplant: 1 × Hispano-Suiza 12Ycrs1 V-12 piston engine, 640 kW (860 hp)

Performance

- Maximum speed: 445 km/h (277 mph, 240 kn) at 5100m (16730 ft)
- Climb to 2000m (6560ft) in 2 minutes 35 seconds.

== Bibliography ==
- Bombeau, Bernard (September 2023). "Dewoitine D. 513: Le chaînon manquant (1)" [Dewoitine D. 513: The Missing Link, Part 1]. Le Fana de l'Aviation (in French) (646): 60–71. ISSN 0757-4169.
- Bombeau, Bernard (October 2023). "Dewoitine D. 513: Le chaînon manquant (2)" [Dewoitine D. 513: The Missing Link, Part 2]. Le Fana de l'Aviation (in French) (647): 66–77. ISSN 0757-4169.
- The Illustrated Encyclopedia of Aircraft (Part Work 1982-1985). Orbis Publishing.
