= Avia 156 =

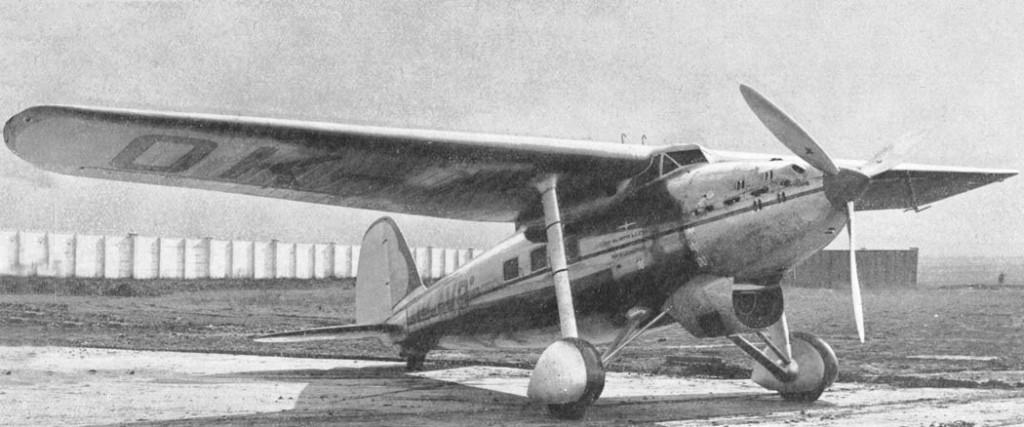

General information
- Type: Six-passenger commercial transport
- National origin: Czechoslovakia
- Manufacturer: Avia
- Designer: Robert Nebesář
- Number built: 1

History
- First flight: 1934

The Avia 156 was a 1930s Czechoslovak six-passenger commercial transport airliner for both mail and passengers, designed by Robert Nebesář and built by Avia. The type performed well but only one was built.

== Development ==
The Avia 156 was a single-engined high-wing cantilever monoplane that first flew in 1934. Powered by a Hispano-Suiza 12Ydrs inline piston engine, it had fixed tailwheel landing gear.

== Specifications ==
Data from

General characteristics

- Crew: two
- Capacity: six
- Length: 10.55 m (34 ft 7 in)
- Wingspan: 15.10 m (49 ft 6 in)
- Wing area: 38 m^{2} (410 sq ft)
- Empty weight: 2,305 kg (5,082 lb)
- Max takeoff weight: 3,790 kg (8,356 lb)
- Powerplant: 1 × Hispano-Suiza 12Ydrs inline piston engine, 630 kW (850 hp)

Performance

- Maximum speed: 350 km/h (220 mph, 190 kn)
- Cruise speed: 330 km/h (210 mph, 180 kn)
- Range: 950 km (590 mi, 510 nmi)
- Service ceiling: 6,200 m (20,300 ft)
