= Amiot 110-S =

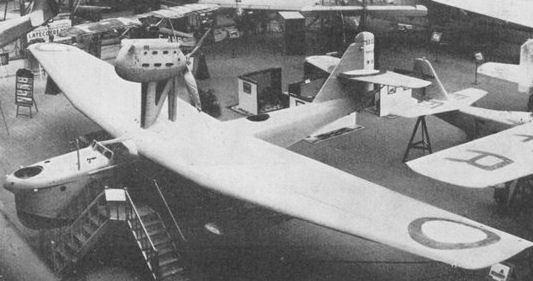

General information
- Type: Marine reconnaissance and medium bomber flying boat and
- National origin: France
- Manufacturer: S.E.C.M. (S.G.A.)

History
- First flight: 12 December 1931

The Amiot 110-S was an all-metal, amphibious military flying boat built in France in the 1930s. It was intended as a maritime reconnaissance and medium bomber aircraft but only two were built.

== Design ==
Jean Latham's aircraft were built in a factory at Caudebec-en-Caux, initially by the Société Latham and two years later by Usines de Caudebec. The works were then purchased by the Société d'Emboutissage et de Constructions Méchaniques (S.E.C.M.), part owned by Félix Amiot and a part of the Société Generale Aéronautique (S.G.A.). One minor consequence of these changes of ownership was that the flying boat first known as the Latham 110 went under several other names, including Latham-S.E.C.M. 110, S.E.C.M. 110, S.E.C.M. (S.G.A.) 110 and Amiot S.E.C.M. 110-S. When Amiot's name was included an S was added to distinguish it from the unrelated Amiot 110 fighter.

Design studies for the single-engine maritime reconnaissance flying boat were under way in the spring of 1930, including a decision to use a similar wing construction method to that of the S.E.C.M. 140. Particular attention was also paid to the hydrodynamics of the planing hull and to the riveting techniques required to make this all-metal aircraft watertight.

The Amiot 110-S had a thick-section wing with a constant-chord centre section, occupying about one-third of the span, and tapered, blunt-tipped outer sections. They were mounted on the top of the fuselage with about 4° of dihedral. The wing structure was a development of the torsion-resistant box spars used in high-performance gliders, with three spars, built out of interconnected steel tubes, forming the central torsion boxes. The wings were duralumin-skinned, riveted to the substructure with separate enclosed leading edge sections which were bolted onto the central box, and the rear parts of the wing were similarly constructed. All sections were individually watertight with the leading edges housing the fuel tanks. The outer sections had high-aspect-ratio ailerons along their trailing edges.

A 480 kW (650 hp) Hispano-Suiza 12Nbr water-cooled, geared V-12 engine was mounted in a pusher position over the wing within a cowling which had an airfoil section in plan but which followed the contours of the cylinder heads. Radiators were positioned under the wings. Initially the engine was supported by N struts with additional lateral bracing struts. It was then redesigned as a single streamlined column. Early plans show a four-bladed propeller but a two-bladed one was fitted.

The slender fuselage, which had a maximum width of only 1,500 mm (59.1 in), was built around a strong longitudinal double beam which, together with other lighter longitudinal beams, located transverse frames with forked lower parts. The skin was riveted duralumin, like the wings. The 110-S's planing hull was a V with deeply concave sides, deepest at the nose then rapidly becoming more shallow rearwards approaching a small, single step. Stability on the water was provided by a pair of V-bottomed floats, strut-mounted from the outer central section. There was an open cockpit in the extreme nose for an observer, who was also responsible for navigation, radio communication and bomb dropping, fitted with a pair of machine guns on a flexible mount. 75 kg (165 lb) bombs were held under the wing. There was a similarly armed cockpit just aft of the wing. The pilots' open cockpit was just ahead of the leading edge of the wing, with side-by-side seating and dual controls. At the rear the tail was conventional, with an almost triangular fin blending, at its top, into a vertical-edged balanced rudder which extended down to the keel. The tailplane was positioned well clear of the spray, over halfway up the fin and braced with struts from the lower fuselage. It carried separate, straight-edged, balanced elevators.

Although the Amiot 110-S was primarily intended as a seaplane, it could be configured as an amphibian by the addition of a retractable wheeled undercarriage. Each single wheel was mounted on a V-strut from the fuselage side near the waterline. A vertical leg to the wheel hub was fitted with a shock absorber. On retraction the wheel was lifted into the wing underside. There was a leaf spring tailskid.

== Development ==
The Amiot 110-S made its first flight on 12 December 1931 but was not mentioned in contemporary publications until shortly before it was displayed at the Paris Salon the following December. During August 1933 minor modifications were made to the hull to improve take-off performance and replacement of the Hispano-Suiza engine by a Gnome-Rhône 14K radial engine in a NACA cowling was considered. In 1935 a new engine was installed but this was a 640 kW (860 hp) Hispano-Suiza 12Ydrs V-12 mounted in tractor configuration and driving a three-blade propeller. Despite the 32% increase in power, its maximum speed of 215 km/h (134 mph; 116 kn) was only 6% faster.

Two Amiot 100-S were built, both of which were re-engined.

== Specifications (Hispano-Suiza 12Nbr engine) ==
Data from Les Ailes, May 1933

General characteristics

- Crew: Normally three
- Length: 14 m (45 ft 11 in)
- Wingspan: 23.25 m (76 ft 3 in)
- Height: 5 m (16 ft 5 in)
- Wing area: 71.2 m^{2} (766 sq ft)
- Aspect ratio: 7.6
- Empty weight: 3,060 kg (6,746 lb)
- Gross weight: 4,500 kg (9,921 lb)
- Powerplant: 1 × Hispano-Suiza 12Nbr water-cooled, geared down V-12, 480 kW (650 hp)
- Propellers: 2/4-bladed

Performance

- Maximum speed: 203 km/h (126 mph, 110 kn) at sea level
- Cruise speed: 180 km/h (110 mph, 97 kn)
- Range: 1,000 km (620 mi, 540 nmi)
- Service ceiling: 4,000 m (13,000 ft) practical
- Time to altitude: 7 min to 1,500 m (4,900 ft)

== Bibliography ==
- Passingham, Malcolm (November–December 1999). "Latham's 'Boats: Pictorial History of the Designs of Jean Latham". Air Enthusiast (84): 22–27. ISSN 0143-5450.
