= Hispano-Suiza 12Y =

V-12 piston aircraft engine

12Y
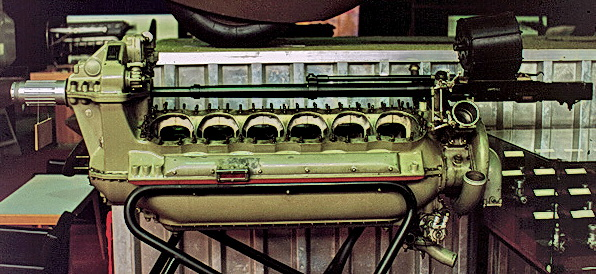
- Type: V-12 piston aero engine
- National origin: France
- Manufacturer: Hispano-Suiza; Avia; Klimov
- First run: 1932
- Major applications: Dewoitine D.520; Ikarus IK-2; Morane-Saulnier MS.406
- Developed from: Hispano-Suiza 12X
- Developed into: Hispano-Suiza 12Z

The Hispano-Suiza 12Y was an aircraft engine produced by Hispano-Suiza for the French Air Force before the Second World War. The 12Y became the primary French 1,000 hp (750 kW) class engine and was used in a number of famous aircraft, including the Morane-Saulnier M.S.406 and Dewoitine D.520.

Its design was based on the earlier, and somewhat smaller, 12X. The 12X did not see widespread use before the 12Y replaced it and became one of the most powerful French designs on the eve of the war. The 12Z was being designed but this was ended by the fall of France and the German occupation.

The 12Y was produced under Hispano-Suiza licence in the Soviet Union as the Klimov M-100. This design led to the highly successful Klimov VK-105 series that powered the Yakovlev and Lavochkin fighters as well as the Petlyakov Pe-2 bomber. Licensed production of the early models was also undertaken in Czechoslovakia as the Avia HS 12Ydrs and in Switzerland as the HS-77.

== Design and development ==
=== Early development ===
The 12Y was a fairly traditional in construction, a 36-litre water-cooled V-12 with the two cast aluminium cylinder banks set at 60 degrees to each other. The cylinder heads were not removable, instead both cylinder banks could be quickly removed from the crankcase section of the engine. This made it somewhat famous for being leak-proof, a design feature that was considered by other designers and almost became a part of the Rolls-Royce Merlin.

The major design change from the earlier 12X was to use a master-articulated connecting rod system, instead of the fork-and-blade type. A single overhead camshaft (SOHC) drove the valves, which were filled with liquid sodium for cooling. Only a single intake and exhaust valve were used, unlike most designs of the era which had moved to three or four valves per cylinder. A single-stage, single-speed supercharger was standard, although the art of designing a useful intake was not as well developed as in other countries, and high altitude performance was always lacking.

The first 12Y test articles were constructed in 1932, and almost immediately the entire French aviation industry began designing aeroplanes based on it. At the time the engine developed only 760 hp (570 kW), but it was clear it had potential to the 1,000 hp (750 kW) class. An early modification led to the Hispano-Suiza 12Ycrs which used a hollow propeller shaft to allow a 20 mm cannon to fire through the propeller spinner (a combination known as a moteur-canon). All later versions shared this feature. The 12Ydrs was the next major series, with a basic rating of 836 hp (623 kW) at sea level with a compression ratio of 5.8:1.

The Armée de l'Air changed their nomenclature, so the next version was the Hispano-Suiza 12Y-21, which increased the compression ratio to 7:1, when running on 100 octane gasoline. This boosted power to 867 hp (647 kW). In 1936 the connecting rod design was changed slightly to create the 12Y-31, but the lower 5.8:1 compression ratio was retained and the power was increased only slightly over the drs model to 850 hp (630 kW). Nevertheless, this became one of the most used engine designs of the pre-war era, used in almost all French fighter designs and prototypes.

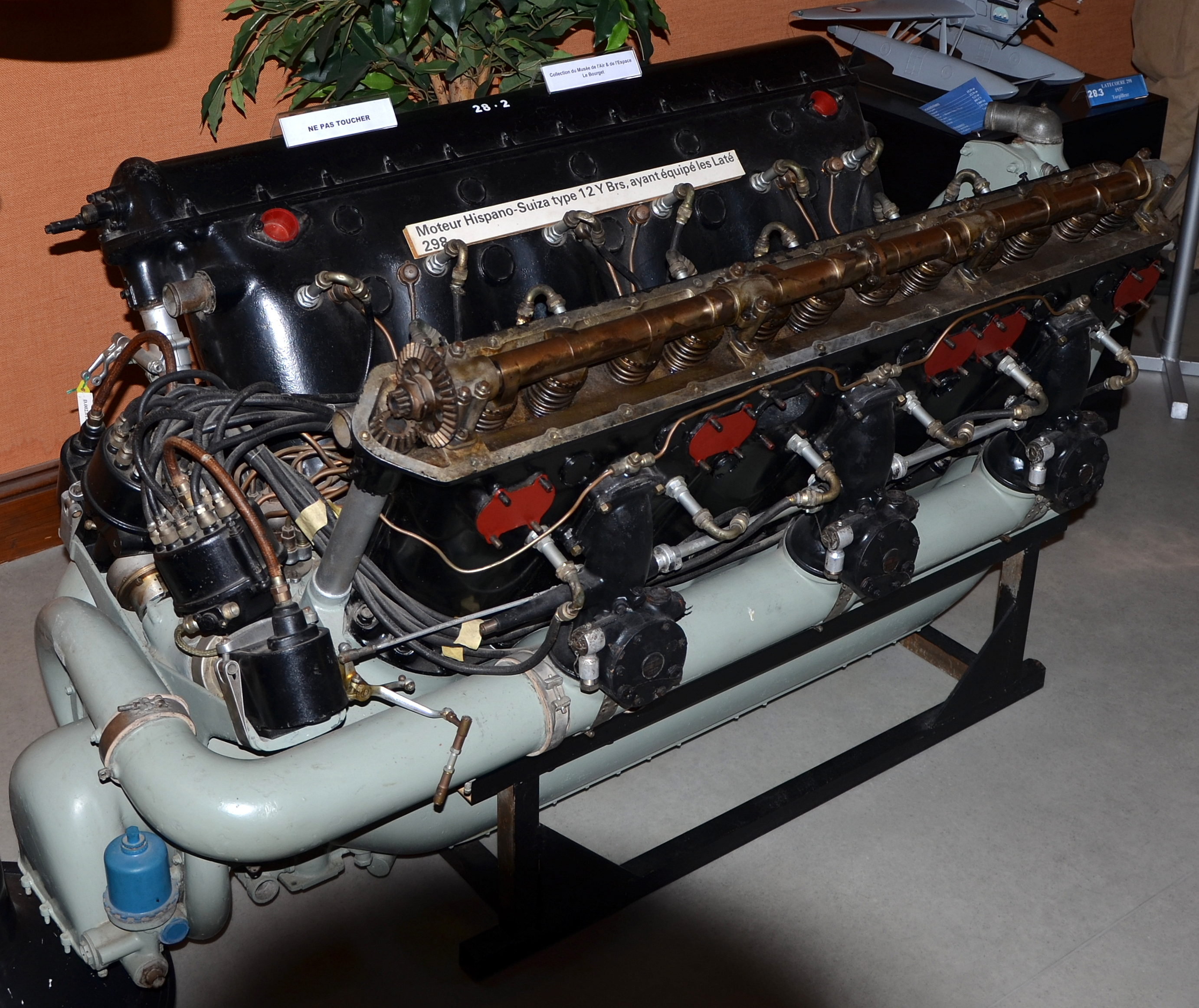
12 Ybrs showing valve gear

=== Late variants ===
A real effort to improve the performance of the engine in 1938 resulted in the Hispano-Suiza 12Y-45, which used the S-39-H3 supercharger co-designed by André Planiol and Polish engineer Joseph Szydlowski. The Szydlowski-Planiol device was larger, but much more efficient than the mediocre Hispano-Suiza models. When used with 100 octane fuel, the supercharger boosted to the -21's 7:1, increasing power to 900 hp (670 kW). Combined with the Ratier constant-speed propeller, this allowed the D.520 to perform as well as contemporary designs from Germany and England.

Another improvement in supercharging led to the Hispano-Suiza 12Y-49, whose performance improved from 850 hp (630 kW) at sea level to 920 hp (690 kW) at just over 10,000 ft (3,000 m). This improvement in power with altitude was a common feature of most engines of the era, the result of the supercharger "robbing" power at low altitudes while not boosting the power due to the possibility of detonation.

The final major version was the 1,085 hp (809 kW) Hispano-Suiza 12Y-51, which had just started into production at the time of the Armistice with Germany. The -51 was the first version that came close to the performance limits of the engine, although the single-stage supercharging meant that it was unable to compete with designs from England and Germany above 15,000 ft (5,000 m).

=== Foreign derivatives ===
In the early 1930s Czechoslovakia gained rights to build a license version of the HS-12Y. This was produced by Avia (Škoda) at Prag - Čakovice. The engine was intended to become the standard powerplant of all Czechoslovak military aircraft. Both the HS-12Ycrs and HS-12Ydrs were built in quantity and were more commonly known by these names rather than any Czechoslovak designation. Aircraft powered by these engines included the Czechoslovak Avia B-34, Avia B-534, Avia B-71, Avia B-35, Avia B-135 and the Yugoslav Rogožarski IK-3 .

Switzerland license built and assembled several different versions of the basic 12Ycrs for use in several aircraft: the reconnaissance biplane the EKW C-35, the multipurpose EKW C-36, the Swiss assembled D-3800 copy of the French M.S. 406 fighter and Swiss built versions of the French M.S.412 fighter called the D.3801. Saurer developed the engine further after the Fall of France into the YS-2 and YS-3 engines. These were used in more powerful follow-on versions of the same basic French fighter design, the M.S.450 called the D.3802 and then the final version called the D.3803.

In the mid-1930s, Russian engineer Vladimir Klimov was sent to France to obtain a license for local production of the 12Y. A series of design changes were added to cope with cold weather operation, and the engine entered production in 1935 as the Klimov M-100 with about 750 hp (560 kW). However a series of continual upgrades increased the allowable RPM from the 12Y's fairly low 2,400 to 2,700, thereby increasing power to 1,100 hp (820 kW). The resulting design, the Klimov M-105 (VK-105) became one of the major Soviet engine designs during the war, powering all Yakovlev fighters.

== Variants ==
Tabulated data from Lage 2004

Type 73 Hispano 12Y engines. V-12, bore: 150 mm, stroke: 170 mm, capacity: 36.0 litres. Type 77 with 20 mm Hispano-Suiza HS.404 cannon between cylinder banks, firing through propeller shaft.
Model	Year	Compression	Power (hp)	@ r.p.m.	T-O power (hp)	Output reduction	Supercharger optimum altitude (m)	Weight (kg)	Cannon (y/n)	Comments
12Ybr 650 hp	1932	6.4	785	2,200	785	1.5	0	415	n	Rated power (650 hp) less than nominal 785 hp
12Ybrs	1934	5.8	860	2,400	835	1.0625	4,000	470	y	
12Ycrs	1934	5.8	860	2,400	835	0.67:1	4,000	470	y	
12Ygrs 650 hp	1932	5.8	850	2,400	800	1.5	4,000	430	n	Rated power (650 hp) less than nominal 850 hp
12Ydr	1934	6.4	800	2,200	800	1.5	0	440	n	As 12Ybr, variable-pitch propeller, left turning. For this and all later entries in both tables, Rated power = Nominal power = Power
12Ydrs	1934	5.8	860	2,400	835	1.5	4,000	470	n	As 12Ybrs, variable-pitch propeller, left turning
12Ydrs1	1934	5.8	880	2,400	890	1.5	2,400	470	n	Variable-pitch propeller, left turning
12Ydrs2	1934	5.8	930	2,400	992	1.5	900	470	n	Variable-pitch propeller, left turning
12Yfrs	1934	5.8	860	2,400	835	1.5	4,000	470	n	As 12Ydrs, right turning
12Yfrs1	1934	5.8	880	2,400	890	1.5	2,400	470	n	As 12Ydrs1, right turning
12Yfrs2	1934	5.8	930	2,400	992	1.5	900	470	n	As 12Ydrs, right turning
12Y-21	1935	7.0	910	2,400	880	1.5	3,600	470	n	
12Y-25	1935	5.8	860	2,400	943	1.5	3,600		n	As 12Ydrs, variable ignition timing
12Y-26	1935	5.8	900	2,400	950	1.8	850	483		opposite rotation to -27
12Y-27	1935	5.8	900	2,400	950	1.8	850	483		opposite rotation to -26
12Y-28		7.2	920	2,400	910	0.67:1	3,600	475	y	LH rotation
12Y-29		7.2	920	2,400	910	0.67:1	3,600	475	y	Identical to -28 but RH rotation
12Y-30	1936	5.8	860	2,400	830	0.67:1	3,250	468	y	Redesigned connecting rods, LH rotation
12Y-31	1936	5.8	860	2,400	830	0.67:1	3,250	468	y	Identical to -30 but RH rotation
12Y-32	1936	5.8	960	2,400	955	0.67:1	2,300	468	y	Redesigned connecting rods, LH rotation
12Y-33	1936	5.8	960	2,400	955	0.67:1	2,300	468	y	Identical to -32 but RH rotation
12Y-36	1936	7.0	960	2,400	1,050	0.55:1	1,250	483	y	LH rotation
12Y-37	1936	7.0	960	2,400	1,050	0.55:1	1,250	483	y	Identical to -36 but RH rotation
12Y-38	1936	7.0	1000	2,400		1.5	3,400		n	LH rotation
12Y-39	1936	7.0	1000	2,400		1.5	3,400		n	Identical to -38 but RH rotation
12Y-41	1936	7.0	920	2,400		0.67:1	3,600	483	y	
12Y-45		7.0	920	2,400	935	0.67:1	4,200		y	Szydlowsky-Planiol (SP) supercharger
12Y-47	1936	5.8	860	2,400	830	0.67:1	3,250	468	y	
12Y 49		7.0	910	2,400	910	0.67:1	5,250		y	(SP) supercharger, variable ignition timing
12Y-50	1939	7.0	1,000	2,500	1,100	0.67:1	3,260	492	y	(SP) supercharger LH rotation
12Y-51	1939	7.0	1,000	2,500	1,100	0.67:1	3,260	492	y	Identical to -50 but RH rotation
Model	Year	Compression	Power (hp)	@ r.p.m.	T-O power (hp)	Output reduction	Supercharger optimum altitude (m)	Weight (kg)	Cannon (y/n)	Comments

=== Related ===
Hispano-Suiza 12Z
Hispano-Suiza 24Y and 24Z

=== Licence built variants ===
Czechoslovakia
Avia HS 12Y

USSR
Klimov VK-100
Klimov VK-103 746 kW (1,000 hp)
Klimov VK-103A 820 kW (1,100 hp) at 2,000 m (6,600 ft)
Klimov VK-104
Klimov VK-105P 820 kW (1,100 hp) at take-off
Klimov VK-106 1,007 kW (1,350 hp) at take-off
Klimov VK-107 1,342 kW (1,800 hp) at take-off

Switzerland
Hispano-Suiza HS-77
12 Ycrs

== Applications ==
- AEKKEA-RAAB R-29
- ANF Les Mureaux 110-119 series
- ANF Les Mureaux 113
- Aero A.104
- Amiot 110-S
- Amiot 143
- Amiot 354
- Amiot 370
- Arsenal VB 10
- Arsenal VG-33
- Arsenal-Delanne 10
- Avia 156
- Avia B-135
- Avia B-34
- Avia B-534
- Avia B.35
- Bernard 260
- Bernard 80 GR
- Bernard 82
- Bloch MB.170
- Bloch MB.177
- Bloch MB.200
- Bloch MB.210
- Blériot-SPAD S.510
- Bréguet 19
- Bréguet 270
- Bréguet 410
- Bréguet 482
- Bréguet 521 Bizerte
- CAMS 110
- CAMS 80
- Caproni Ca.335
- D.3800/01/02/03
- Dewoitine D.500
- Dewoitine D.510
- Dewoitine D.513
- Dewoitine D.520
- Dewoitine D.770
- Dornier Do 22
- EKW C-35
- EKW C-36
- Fairey Fantôme
- Fairey Fox
- Farman F.220
- Farman NC.223.3
- Farman NC.223.4
- Fauvel AV.29
- Ikarus IK-2
- Latham 47
- Latécoère 298
- Latécoère 300
- Latécoère 380
- Latécoère 521
- Lioré et Olivier LeO 25
- Lioré et Olivier LeO H-47
- Loire 130
- Loire-Nieuport 161
- Loire-Nieuport LN.401
- Morane-Saulnier M.S.406
- Morane-Saulnier M.S.475
- Morane-Saulnier Vanneau
- Nieuport-Delage NiD-120
- Potez 230
- Potez 39
- Potez-CAMS 141
- Potez-CAMS 160
- Potez-CAMS 161
- Renard R-36
- Renard R.31
- Rogozarski IK-3
- Romano R.90
- SAB AB-80
- SNCAC NC.130
- SNCAC NC.150
- SNCAC NC.4-10
- SNCAO 200
- Wibault 360
- Wibault 366

=== Klimov powered ===
- Arkhangelsky Ar-2
- Bartini DAR
- Beriev MBR-7
- Bolkhovitinov S
- Lavochkin-Gorbunov-Goudkov LaGG-1
- Lavochkin-Gorbunov-Goudkov LaGG-3
- Mörkö-Morane
- Petlyakov Pe-2
- Petlyakov Pe-3
- Petlyakov Pe-8
- Polikarpov I-17
- Tupolev SB
- Yakovlev Yak-1
- Yakovlev Yak-2
- Yakovlev Yak-3
- Yakovlev Yak-4
- Yakovlev Yak-7
- Yakovlev Yak-9
- Yermolayev Yer-2

== Specifications (12Y-50) ==
Data from Aircraft Engines of the World 1945

=== General characteristics ===
- Type: Twelve-cylinder supercharged liquid-cooled 60° V12 engine
- Bore: 150 mm (5.9 in)
- Stroke: 170 mm (6.69 in)
- Displacement: 36 L (2,197 cu in)
- Length: 2,137 mm (84.3 in)
- Width: 764 mm (29.9 in)
- Height: 945 mm (37 in)
- Dry weight: 492 kg (1,085 lb)

=== Components ===
- Valvetrain: One intake and one sodium-filled exhaust valve per cylinder actuated via a single overhead camshaft per bank.
- Supercharger: Gear-driven single-speed centrifugal type supercharger, 10:1 gear ratio
- Fuel system: Six Solex 56 S.V.C carburetors
- Fuel type: 87 octane rating gasoline
- Oil system: Pressure feed, dry sump.
- Cooling system: Pressurised, liquid-cooled
- Reduction gear: Spur, 0.67:1

=== Performance ===
- Power output: 820 kW (1,100 hp) at 2,400 rpm for takeoff
- Specific power: 22.8 kW/L (0.38 hp/in^{3})
- Compression ratio: 7:1
- Specific fuel consumption: 0.5 lb/(hp•h)
- Oil consumption: 0.018 lb/(hp•h)
- Power-to-weight ratio: 1.66 kW/kg (1.01 hp/lb)

== See also ==
Comparable engines

- Allison V-1710
- Daimler-Benz DB 601
- Mikulin AM-35
- Rolls-Royce Merlin

Related lists

- List of aircraft engines
