= EKW C-35 =

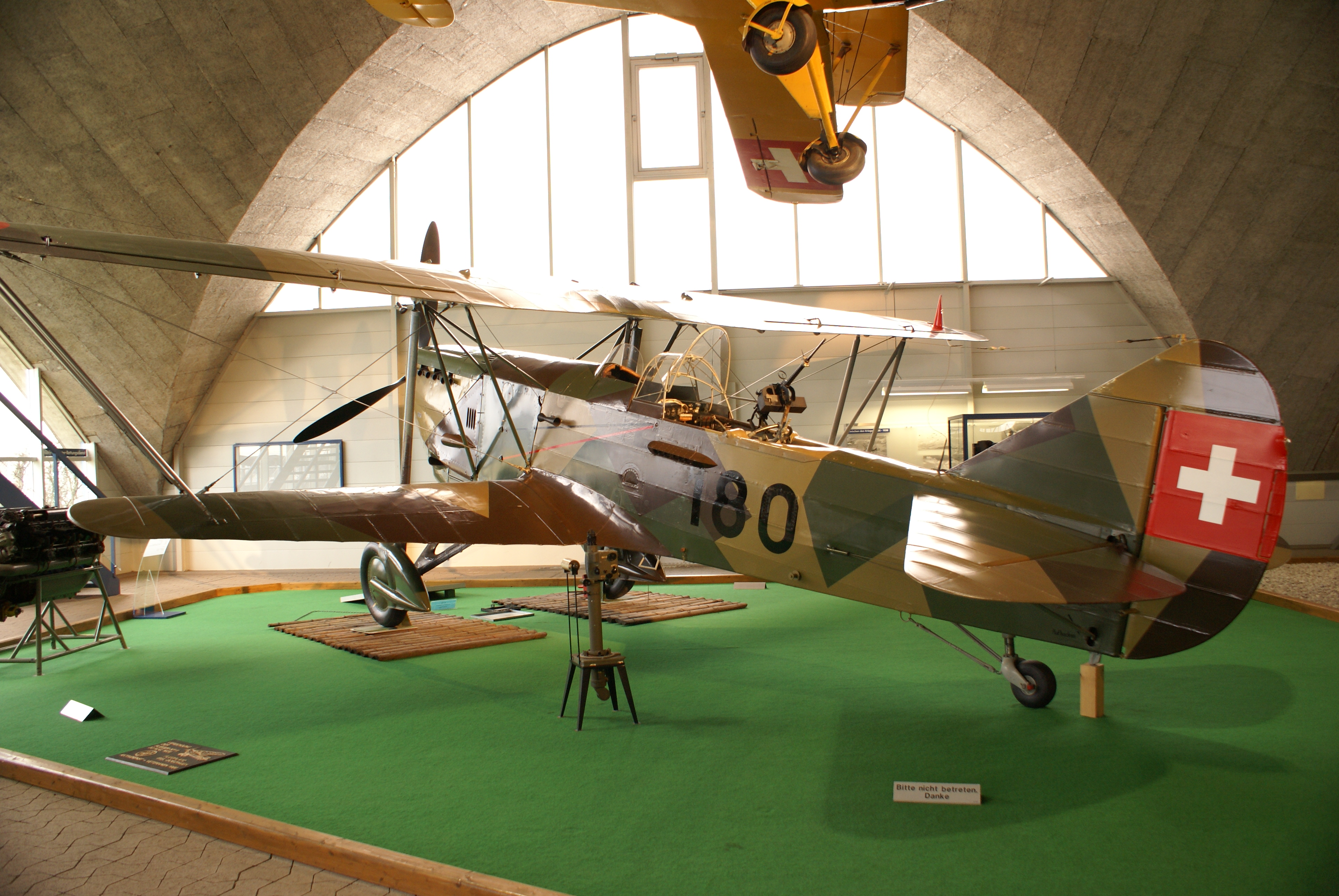

General information
- Type: Reconnaissance and ground-attack aircraft
- Manufacturer: K+W
- Primary user: Swiss Air Force
- Number built: 90

History
- Introduction date: 1936
- First flight: 1930s
- Retired: 1954

The EKW C-35 was a 1930s Swiss two-seat reconnaissance biplane aircraft built by the Swiss Federal Construction Works (Eidgenoessische Konstruktionswerkstaette, K+W), Thun.

== Development ==
Two aircraft were designed by the Eidgenössische Konstruktions Werkstätte to replace the Fokker C.Ve which the Swiss Air Force were using. The two projects were the EKW C-35 biplane and the EKW C-36 monoplane. After evaluation the air force ordered 40 C-35s in 1936. Additional aircraft were built from spares. The C-35 was a two-seat biplane with fixed tailwheel landing gear and conventional tail unit. The aircraft was powered by a Hispano-Suiza HS-77 V-12 piston engine (licence-built Hispano-Suiza 12Ycrs).

== Operational history ==
The first aircraft was delivered to the Swiss Air Force in May 1937, and all had been delivered by the end of 1938. To supplement the aircraft in-service a further eight aircraft were built between 1941 and 1942 from spares. The aircraft were removed from front-line service in 1943 when replaced by the F&W C-3603 and transferred to night-flying units. The aircraft was withdrawn from service in 1954.

== Operators ==
Switzerland

- Swiss Air Force

== Specifications (C-35) ==
Data from The Illustrated Encyclopedia of Aircraft (Part Work 1982-1985), 1985, Orbis Publishing, Page 1593

General characteristics

- Crew: Two
- Length: 9.54 m (31 ft 3.5 in)
- Wingspan: 13.08 m (42 ft 11 in)
- Height: 3.75 m (12 ft 3.5 in)
- Wing area: 32 m^{2} (344.46 sq ft)
- Empty weight: 2,190 kg (4,828 lb)
- Gross weight: 3,130 kg (6,900 lb)
- Powerplant: 1 × Hispano-Suiza HS-77 piston engine (licence-built Hispano-Suiza 12Ycrs) , 642 kW (860 hp)

Performance

- Maximum speed: 335 km/h (208 mph, 181 kn)
- Range: 750 km (466 mi, 405 nmi)
- Service ceiling: 8,000 m (26,247 ft)
- Rate of climb: 11.51 m/s (2,265 ft/min)

Armament

- 1 x 20-mm cannon (forward firing through propeller hub)
- 2 x fixed forward firing 7.5 mm (0.295in) machine-guns in wings
- 1 x flexible 7.5 mm (0.295in) machine-gun in rear-cockpit
- 22lb (22kg) of bombs on underwing racks

== Bibliography ==
- Cortet, Pierre (June 1998). "Rétros du Mois" [Retros of the Month]. Avions: Toute l'aéronautique et son histoire (in French) (75): 4. ISSN 1243-8650.
