= Hispano-Suiza 12X =

French aircraft component

12X
- Hispano-Suiza 12Xbrs at the Polish Aviation Museum in Kraków.
- Type: V-12 piston aero engine
- National origin: France
- Manufacturer: Hispano-Suiza
- Major applications: Potez 540; Loire 130
- Developed into: Hispano-Suiza 12Y

The Hispano-Suiza 12X was an aircraft piston engine designed in France by Hispano-Suiza during the early 1930s. A 12-cylinder Vee, liquid-cooled design, the 12X was used on several aircraft types, some of them being used in limited numbers during World War II. Due to the 12X's limited power output, its derivative the more powerful Hispano-Suiza 12Y had a longer career.

== Variants ==
Tabulated data from: Lage, 2004

Type 72 Hispano-Suiza 12X engines. V-12, bore=130 mm, stroke=170 mm, capacity=27.0 litres.
Model	Year	Compression	Power (hp)	@ r.p.m.	T-O power (hp)	Output reduction	Supercharger optimum altitude (m)	Weight (kg)	Comments
12Xbr (500 hp)	1932	6.4	610	2,200	610	1.5	0	355	Unsupercharged. Rated power (500 hp) less than nominal 610 hp
12Xbrs (500 hp)	1932	5.8	650	2,650	600	1.5	4,000	370	Rated power (500 hp) less than nominal 650 hp
12Xbrg (500 hp)	1932	5.8	715	2,650	670	1.5	2,000	370	Rated power (500 hp) less than nominal 650 hp
12Xbr (600 hp)	1934	6.4	600	2,200	630	1.5		355	For this and all later entries in both tables, Rated power = Nominal power = Power
12Xbrs (690 hp)	1934	5.8	690	2,600	660	1.5	4,500	370	
12Xbrs1 (720 hp)	1934	5.8	720	2,600	704	1.5	2,750	370	
12Xdrs	1935	5.8	690	2,600	670	1.5	4,000	370	Left handed
12Xfrs	1935	5.8	690	2,600	670	1.5	4,000	370	Right handed
12Xgrs	1935	5.8	690	2,600	670	1.5	4,000	370	Hamilton propeller, right handed
12Xgrs1	1937	5.8	720	2,600		1.5	2,100	370	Hamilton propeller, right handed
12Xhrs	1935	5.8	690	2,600	670	1.5	4,000	370	Hamilton propeller, left handed
12Xhrs1	1937	5.8	720	2,600		1.5	2,100	370	Hamilton propeller, left handed
12Xirs	1935	5.8	690	2,600	670	1.5	4,000	370	Flat flange propeller, left handed
12Xjrs	1935	5.8	690	2,600	670	1.5	4,000	370	Flat flange propeller, right handed

Type 76 Hispano-Suiza 12X engines with 20 mm calibre Hispano-Suiza 404 cannon between cylinder banks, firing through propeller shaft. Cylinder dimensions as Type 73.
Model	Year	Compression	Power (hp)	@ r.p.m.	T-O power (hp)	Output reduction	Supercharger optimum altitude (m)	Weight (kg)	Comments
12Xcrs (690 hp)	1934	5.8	690	2,600	660	1.5	4,500	380	
12Xers	1934	5.8	690	2,600	660	1.5	4,500	380	Variable-pitch propeller
12Xirs	1937	5.8	690	2,600	660	1.5	3,900	385	Left handed
12Xjrs	1937	5.8	690	2,600	660	1.5	3,900	385	Right handed
12Xirs1	1937	5.8	720	2,600	738	1.5	2,100	385	Left handed
12Xjrs1	1937	5.8	720	2,600	738	1.5	2,100	385	Right handed
12X 13	1937		690	2,600	738	1.5	3,900	371	

Hispano-Suiza 12Xrs

== Applications ==
- Bernard 260
- Blériot-SPAD S.510
- Dewoitine D.500
- Hanriot H.110
- Hawker Spanish Fury
- Hawker Spanish Osprey
- Loire 102
- Loire 130
- Loire-Nieuport LN.40
- Lioré et Olivier H-246
- Mitsubishi A5M3a
- Morane-Saulnier M.S. 227
- Nakajima Ki-12
- Potez 540
- Potez 650

== Specifications (12Xcrs) ==
Data from

=== General characteristics ===
- Type: Twelve-cylinder supercharged liquid-cooled 60° Vee piston engine
- Bore: 130 mm (5.12 in)
- Stroke: 170 mm (6.69 in)
- Displacement: 27 L (1,648 in³)
- Length: 1,577 mm (62.09 in)
- Width: 726 mm (28.58 in)
- Height: 904 mm (35.59 in)
- Dry weight: 380 kg (838 lb)

=== Components ===
- Valvetrain: Overhead camshaft with two valves per cylinder
- Supercharger: Single-speed centrifugal type supercharger, 10:1 reduction
- Fuel system: Six Solex carburetors
- Fuel type: 85 octane rating gasoline
- Cooling system: Liquid-cooled
- Reduction gear: Spur, 2:3

=== Performance ===
- Power output:
- 486 kW (651 hp) at 2,600 rpm for takeoff
- 508 kW (681 hp) at 2,600 rpm at 4,500 m (14,765 ft)
- Specific power: 18.81 kW/L (0.41 hp/in³)
- Compression ratio: 5.8:1
- Specific fuel consumption: 328 g/(kW•h) (0.54 lb/(hp•h))
- Oil consumption: 11 g/(kW•h) (0.28 oz/(hp•h))
- Power-to-weight ratio: 1.34 kW/kg (0.81 hp/lb)

== See also ==
Comparable engines

- BMW VI
- Curtiss V-1570
- Rolls-Royce Kestrel

Related lists

- List of aircraft engines
