= Dewoitine D.500 =

1932 French fighter aircraft

D.500/501/503/510/511
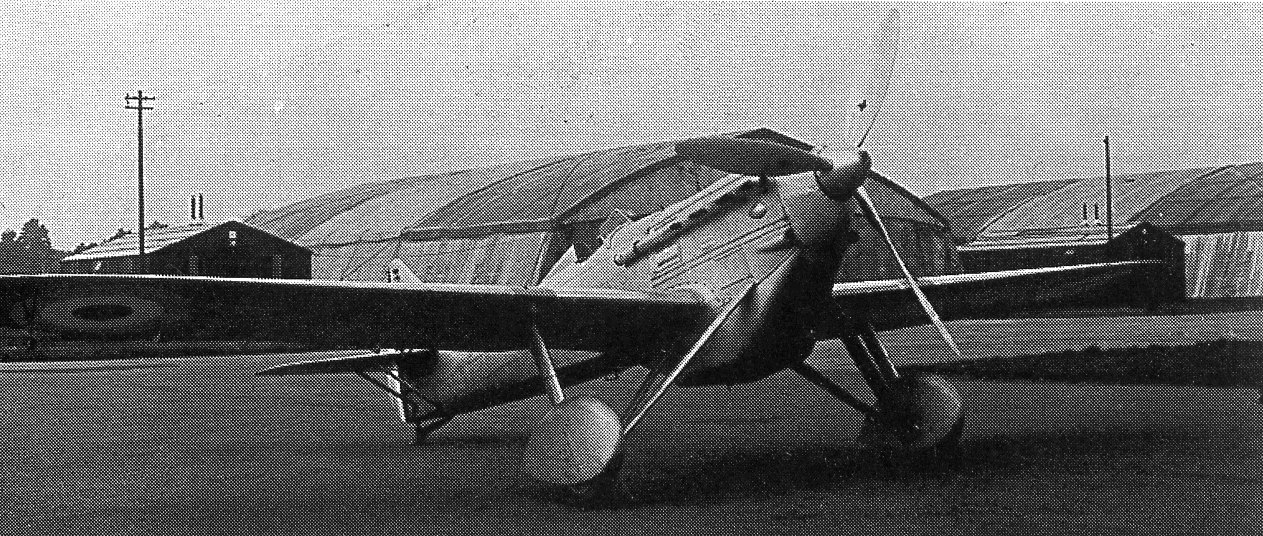
- A Dewoitine 510 at The A&AEE Martlesham Heath in October 1936

General information
- Type: Fighter aircraft
- Manufacturer: Dewoitine
- Designer: Émile Dewoitine
- Status: Retired
- Primary users: French Air Force French Navy
- Number built: 381

History
- Introduction date: July 1935
- First flight: 18 June 1932

The Dewoitine D.500 was an all-metal, open-cockpit, fixed-undercarriage monoplane fighter aircraft designed and produced by French aircraft manufacturer Dewoitine.

Developed to meet a specification issued by the French Air Ministry in 1930, the D.500 was intended to be a more capable replacement to the Nieuport 62. Ordered by the French Air Force during November 1933 and introduced in its initial model during 1935, the design was developed into several variants, most notably the D.510, which was re-engined with the more powerful Hispano-Suiza 12Ycrs powerplant. It proved to be a relatively popular aircraft during the Interwar period; in France, in addition to the French Air Force's units, a specialised variant, the D.501, was also procured by the French Naval Aviation for carrier operations. Beyond its use in France, the D.500 saw several export sales and evaluations by prospective major customers including the Empire of Japan, the Soviet Union, and the United Kingdom.

The D.500/D.501 saw combat with several operators. During the Spanish Civil War, it was surreptitiously supplied to the Spanish Republican Air Force; it was also flown by the Republic of China Air Force against the invading Japanese during the Second Sino-Japanese War. During the late 1930s, the type was largely superseded by a new generation of French fighter aircraft, these typically featured further innovations such as enclosed cockpits and retractable undercarriages, and included the design's direct successor, the Dewoitine D.520. Despite being largely obsolete, both D.500s and D.510s were operated by the French Air Force during the initial months of the Second World War, the latter remaining in use up to the end of the Battle of France and signing of the Armistice of 22 June 1940 between France and Nazi Germany.

== Development ==
The origin of the D.500 was the issuing of the C1 specifications by the French Air Ministry during 1930. Several aviation companies investigated a response to C1, including French aircraft manufacturer Dewoitine, headed by Émile Dewoitine. Dewoitine and his team designed a clean-sheet all-metal monoplane interceptor and submitted their proposal, designated D.500, to the Air Ministry. On 18 June 1932, the prototype made its maiden flight. During November 1933, an initial quantity of sixty aircraft was ordered from Dewoitine on behalf of the French Air Force, for whom the type was to serve as a replacement for the Nieuport 62. On 29 November 1934, the first production D.500 made its first flight.

In service, those aircraft armed with a pair of twin nose-mounted machine guns were designated as D.500, while those with a single 20 mm cannon which fired through the propeller hub received the designation D.501. Perhaps the most significant derivative of the type was the D.510, the principle difference of which was the adoption of a more powerful Hispano-Suiza 12Ycrs engine, capable of 640 kW (860 hp); minor refinements included a slightly lengthened nose, an increase in fuel capacity and a refined undercarriage arrangement. The design was further developed into the more capable Dewoitine D.520, which had an enclosed cockpit and a retractable undercarriage, unlike its predecessor.

== Design ==
The Dewoitine D.500 was an all-metal low-wing cantilever monoplane. It featured a sharp fuselage, complete with a streamlined nose section that housed the aircraft's powerplant, a single Hispano-Suiza 12Xbrs V-12 liquid-cooled piston engine capable of generating up to 515 kW (691 hp). Underneath the fuselage was a relatively large-volume radiator, which was designed to present the smallest possible frontal area while still meeting the cooling requirements of the Hispano-Suiza engine. The cockpit of the D.500 was located directly above the trailing edge of the wing. The pilot is provided with a vertically-adjustable chair, which can be raised in-flight to improve visibility for landing. The cockpit was equipped with oxygen apparatus as well as a radio set for communication. The control stick was connected to the aircraft's ailerons via a rod transmission to horns present on the upper wing's surface. The control surfaces of the D.500 were relatively small as a result of the aircraft's high speed performance.

The D.500 had an ovoid section monocoque fuselage, the structure of which comprised five main and eight false bulkheads which were connected together by four longerons and intermediate stringers; these stiffened the metal sheet covering, which was riveted onto the structure. The sternpost was integral with the fuselage, while the engine bearer, comprising an oblique frame, was directly bolted to the attachment brackets of the crankcase. The aircraft's adjustable stabiliser was hinged around its front spar while rigid struts connected to either side of the lower fuselage to provide transverse stiffness. The fixed undercarriage had faired axleless wheels, complete with pneumatic brakes, mounted on a pair of V struts attached to the lower fuselage longerons. The undercarriage's vertical stresses are absorbed by an oleo-pneumatic strut bolted to the central wing's single spar and is integral with the fuselage.

The D.500 had a low-mounted elliptical, all-metal cantilever wing, with an aspect ratio of 8.9. It had a relatively small chord and contained only a single spar, similar to the record-setting Dewoitine D.33. The wing's strength came from its box spar, which was formed from a pair of vertical webs of sheet metal that connect with the flanges, which are in turn riveted to the flat sheet rib arcs of the sheet covering. The wing had a thickness of 0.3 m (11,81 in.) at the root, gradually tapering towards its rounded-off tips. Balanced ailerons extended throughout the span, except near the fuselage, where these were reduced to provide greater downward visibility for the pilot. The lower wing surface sat only 1.5 m (4.92 ft.) above the ground, which generated a beneficial ground effect to significantly reduce landing speeds. The aircraft's fuel tanks, which were located in the wing's center portion on either side of the axis of symmetry, could be separately isolated using a multi-way stopcock.

== Operational history ==
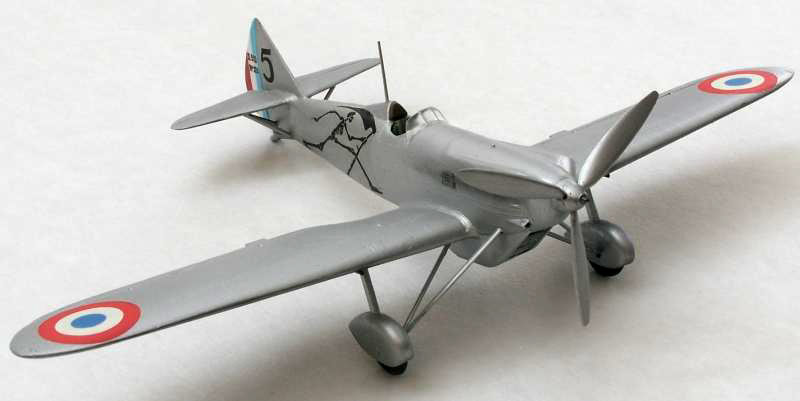
A scale model of a D.510 in French Air Force markings

During July 1935, the initial models of the aircraft, the D.500 and D.501, were inducted into the Armée de l'Air. During October 1936, the first examples of the more powerful D.510 variant were also delivered. The type was operated as the primary fighter aircraft of the Armée de l'Air, despite it soon being considered to be obsolete due to rapid advances in fighter technology being introduced during the late 1930s. The D.510s were retained in the mainline fighter role until their replacement by the more capable Morane-Saulnier M.S.406 during 1939. By September 1939, the month in which the Second World War broke out between the European powers, the early D.500/501 models had been relegated to regional defense and training squadrons.

At the start of the conflict, significant numbers of D.510s were still in operation with three Groupes de Chasse (Fighter Groups), two Escadrilles Régionale de Chasse (Regional Fighter Squadrons in North Africa), and two Escadrilles de Aéronautique Navale (Naval Aviation Squadrons). The type was normally tasked with the air defence of areas behind the front line, such as cities and industrial areas. During November 1939, in Morocco, North Africa, a single escadrille of D.510s (ERC571) was activated despite these planes lacking cannon. During May 1940, this escadrille merged with ERC 573 to form GC III/4. This groupe was disbanded by the end of August 1940. At Dakar, one groupe designated GC I/6, remained in service until being replaced by Curtiss H-75s at the end of 1941.

Fourteen D.501s (named D.501L), originally sold to Lithuania, and two D.510s ostensibly intended for the Emirate of Hedjaz, saw service with the Republican forces during the Spanish Civil War, arriving some time during mid-1936. When the French government found out about the delivery of the D.510s, they demanded the return of the 12Y engines. As a result of this request, these aircraft were refitted with Klimov M-100s (a Soviet-built copy of the 12Y) from a Tupolev SB bomber. During the conflict, the two D.510s were assigned to the 71st Coastal Defense Group. Neither reportedly engaged any enemy fighters. During 1938, one aircraft was irreparably damaged while landing, while the other was destroyed on a runway during a bombing attack.

In June 1938, the Nationalist Air Force of China established the 41st PS, French Volunteer Squadron at Wujiaba Airbase and Qingyunpu Airbase; French volunteer pilots participating in few combat engagements against the Japanese attacks while flying in both Hawk IIIs and the D.510s which they were demonstrating for Chinese procurement, but suffered only losses, including one pilot killed-in-action against the Japanese A5M fighters that proved to be too difficult of an adversary, and led to the disbandment of the 41st PS by October 1938. The 18 D.510 fighters left in China were reassigned to Chinese Nationalist Air Force 17th Fighter Squadron, 5th Fighter Group, where they would be stationed in Sichuan province and engaging the Imperial Japanese in primarily-defensive airwar campaign in the Battle of Chongqing-Chengdu. The French also dispatched two D.510 to Japan for evaluation by the Imperial Japanese Navy, but the Japanese found the A5M to be superior and did not place any orders.

In course of the air battles over Chengdu and Chongqing, which were mostly fought using Soviet-made Polikarpov I-15 and I-16 fighter aircraft, Capt. Cen Zeliu of the Chinese Air Force 17th Fighter Squadron, 5th Fighter Group led seven Dewoitine D.510s fighters on 4 November 1939 in a level, head-on attack against an incoming formation of IJANF G3M bombers. Cen used experiences with the unreliability of the Hispano-Suiza HS.404 20mm autocannon under the g-forces of a diving attack to influence his method, and shot down the lead bomber of the formation, piloted by the commander of the 13th Kōkūtai.

== Variants ==
Sources: Green, Chant

D.500.01

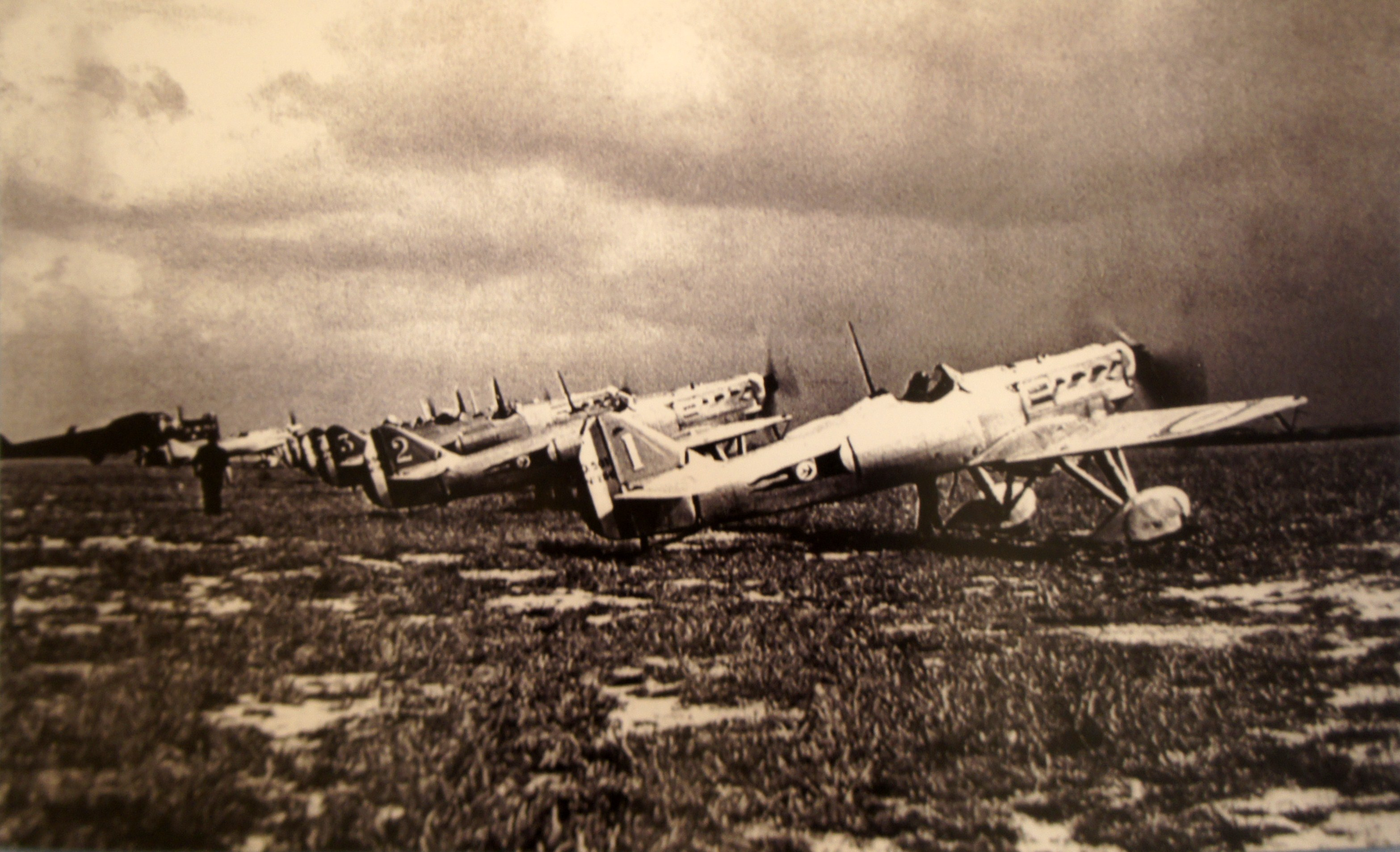
D.500 at the Reims – Champagne Air Base, c.1938

First prototype aircraft.
D.500
First production version with a 515 kW (691 hp) Hispano-Suiza 12Xbrs engine and was armed with 2 × 7.7 mm (.303 in) Vickers machine guns or 2 × 7.5 mm (.295 in) Darne machine guns in the nose, provision for 2 × additional Darnes in the wings. 101 built.
D.500V
D.500 built for Venezuela - 3 built.
D.501

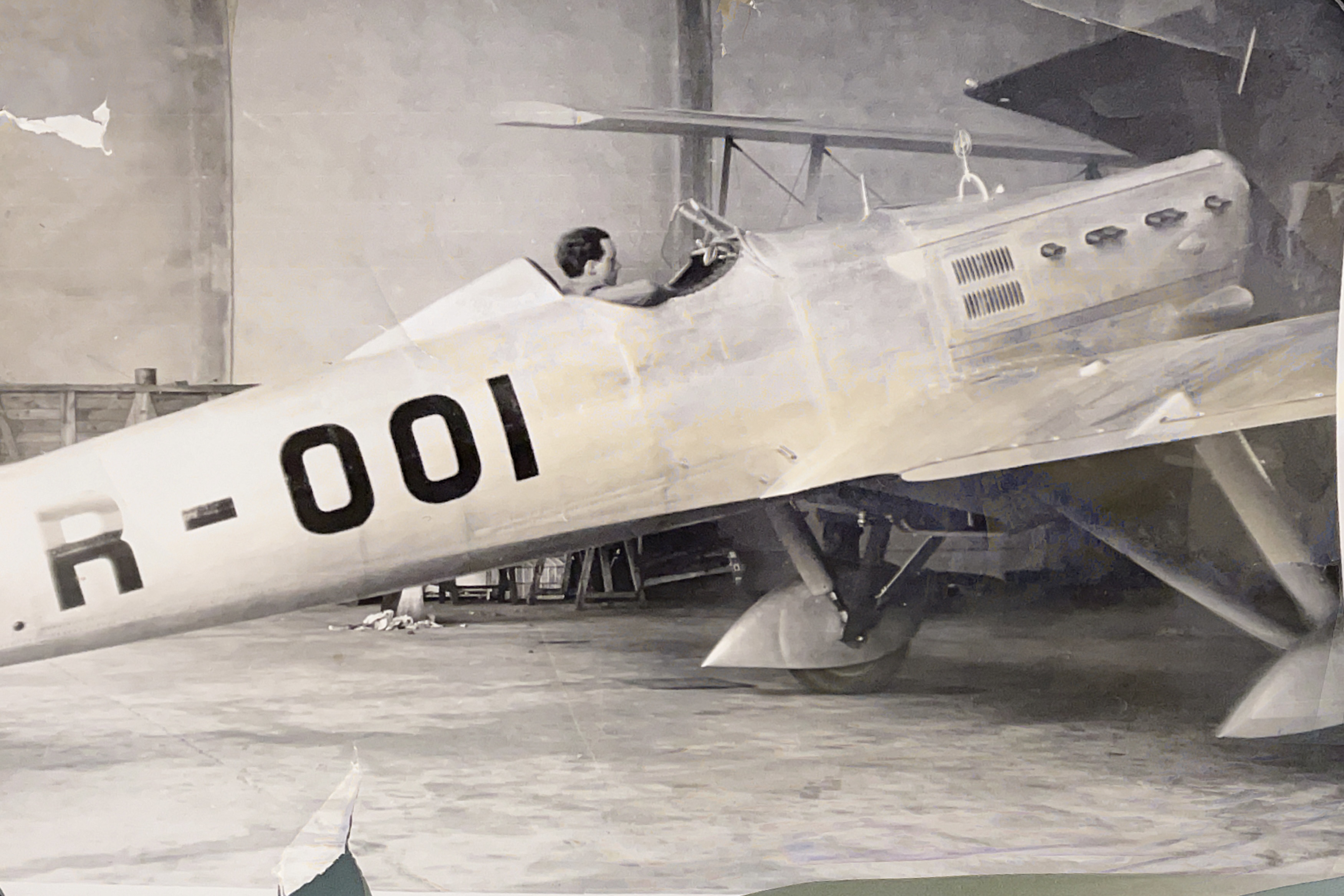
D.501 number R-001

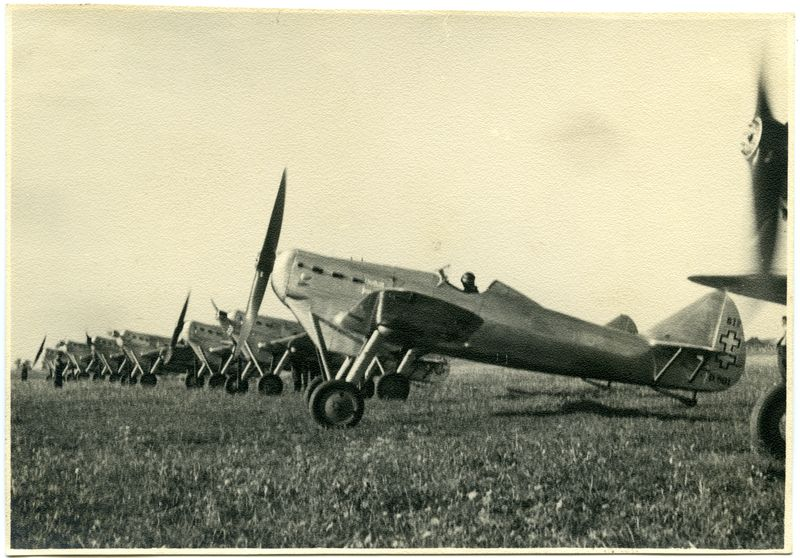
Dewoitine D.501L of the Lithuanian Air Force, c. 1938-1940

Re-engined with a Hispano-Suiza 12Xcrs engine, it was armed with a 20 mm (0.79 in) Hispano-Suiza S7 cannon between the engine cylinder banks firing through the propeller hub and 2 × wing-mounted machine guns. 157 built.
D.501L
D.501 built for Lithuania - 14 built.
D.503

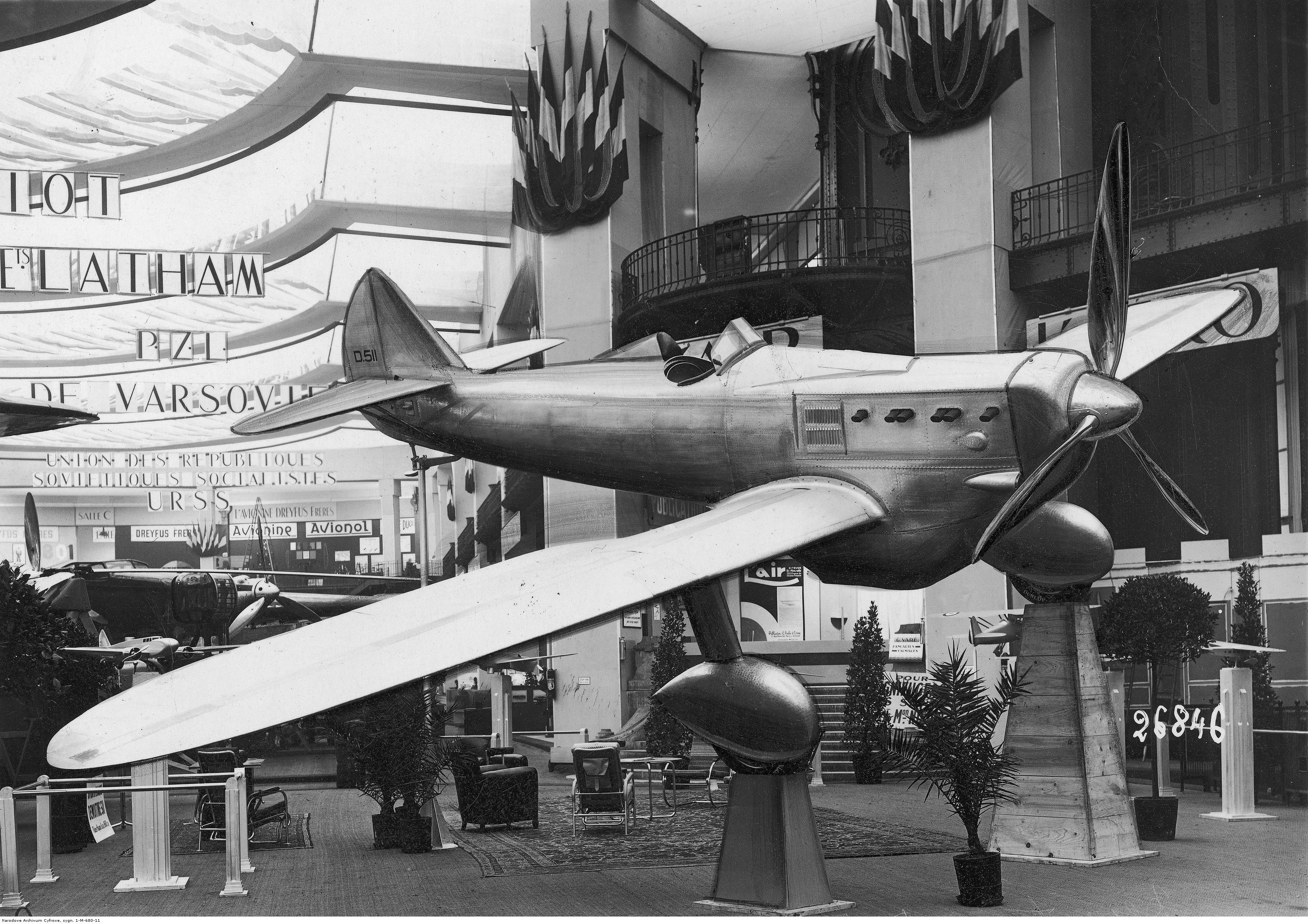
D.511 prototype

The sole D.511 prototype fitted with a 12Xcrs engine with a circular radiator in the nose, it had the same armament as the D.501. Its first flight was on 15 April 1935, it was found to perform worse than the D.500. The aircraft was briefly the personal mount of René Fonck.
D.510
Re-engined with a 640 kW (860 hp) Hispano-Suiza 12Ycrs and armed with a 20 mm (0.79 in) Hispano cannon and 2 × 7.5 mm (0.30 in) MAC 1934 machine guns in the wings. Its first flight was on 14 August 1934, 120 built.
D.510A
D.510 built for Britain for evaluation - 1 built.
D.510C
D.510 built for China - 24 built.
D.510J
D.510 built for Japan for evaluation - 1 built.
D.510R
D.510 built for Russia for evaluation - 1 built.
D.510T
D.510 built for Turkey - 12 built but deliveries halted by embargo.
D.511
Prototype with D.500 fuselage and tail, it had smaller wings, a cantilever undercarriage and a 12Ycrs engine. One prototype was built in 1934 but never flown; it was converted to the D.503.
AXD1
The short designation for the single Dewoitine D.510J supplied to the Imperial Japanese Navy Air Service for evaluation in 1935.
Dewoitine Navy Type D Carrier Fighter
Long service designation for the D.510J which was supplied to the IJNAS in 1935.

== Operators ==
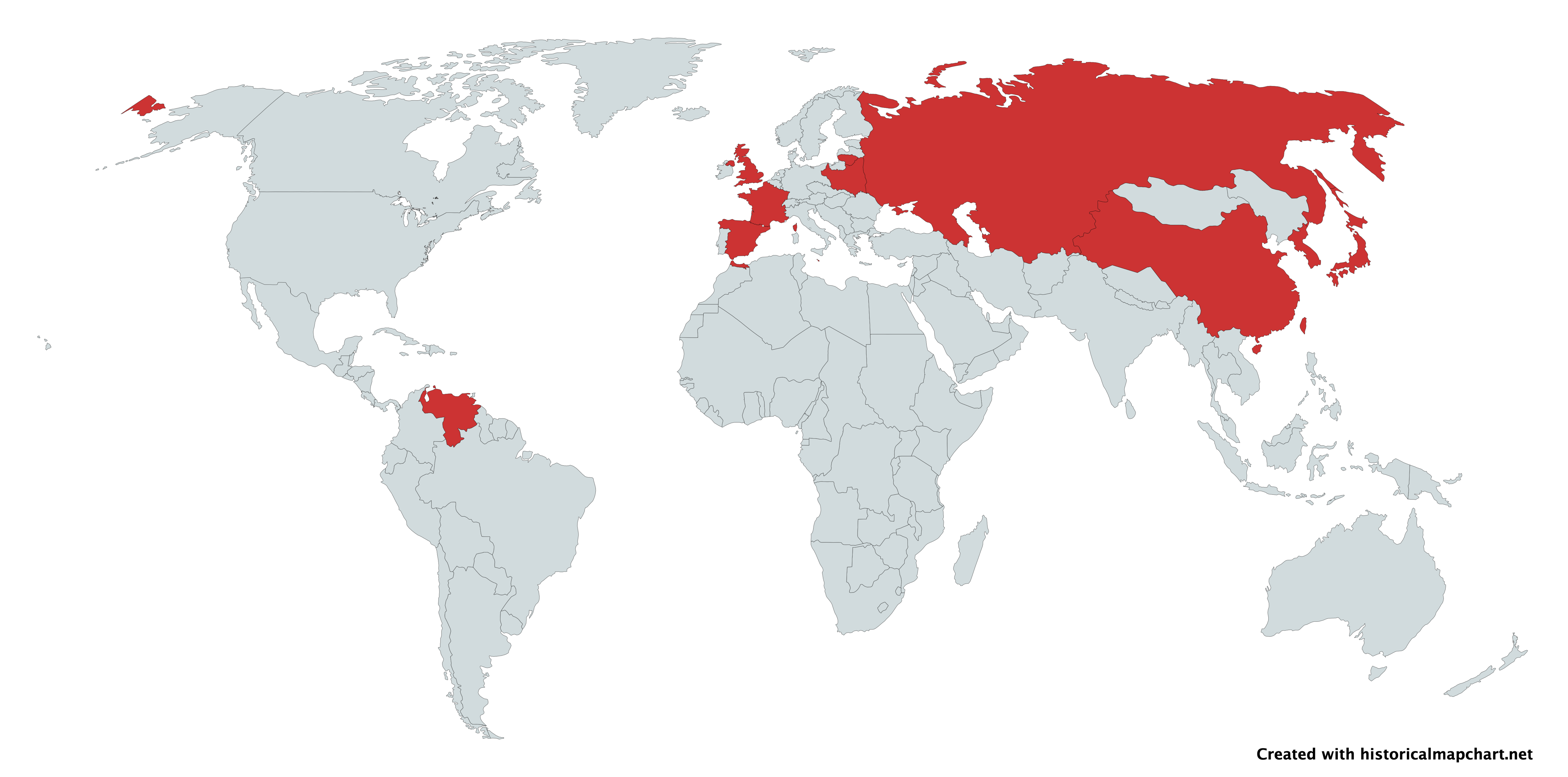
Map with former users of the D.500 in red

Japanese Dewoitine D.510

China

- Republic of China Air Force - 24 D.510C

France

- French Air Force 98 x D.500, 130 x D.501 and 88 x D.510
- Aviation Navale 30 x D.501

Japan

- Japanese Imperial Navy 2 x D.510J designated as AXD

Lithuania

- Lithuanian Air Force - 14 x D.501L

Poland

- Polish Air Forces in exile in France

Soviet Union

- Soviet Air Force 1 x D.510R for evaluation

Spain

- Spanish Republican Air Force. 7 x D.500 and 2 x D.510 in the Escuadrilla Internacional.

United Kingdom

- Royal Air Force - One x 510A for evaluation

Venezuela

- Venezuelan Air Force - 3 D.500V

== Specifications (D.510) ==
Dewoitine D.500 3-view

Data from The Great Book of Fighters, The Dewoitine D.500 pursuit airplane

General characteristics

- Crew: One
- Length: 7.94 m (26 ft 1 in)
- Wingspan: 12.09 m (39 ft 8 in)
- Height: 2.42 m (7 ft 11 in)
- Wing area: 16.5 m^{2} (178 sq ft)
- Empty weight: 1,496 kg (3,298 lb)
- Gross weight: 1,929 kg (4,253 lb)
- Powerplant: 1 × Hispano-Suiza 12Ycrs V-12 liquid-cooled piston engine, 640 kW (860 hp)
- Propellers: 3-bladed Ratier metal propeller

Performance

- Maximum speed: 402 km/h (250 mph, 217 kn) at 5,000 m (16,000 ft)
- Range: 700 km (430 mi, 380 nmi)
- Service ceiling: 11,000 m (36,000 ft)
- Rate of climb: 14.85 m/s (2,923 ft/min)
- Time to altitude: 1,000 m (3,300 ft) in 1 minute 19 seconds
- Wing loading: 117 kg/m^{2} (24 lb/sq ft)
- Power/mass: 0.330 kW/kg (0.201 hp/lb)

Armament

- Guns:
  - 1 × 20 mm (0.787 in) Hispano-Suiza HS.9 cannon, 60 rounds
  - 2 × 7.5 mm (0.295 in) MAC 1934 machine guns, 300 rpg

== See also ==
Aircraft of comparable role, configuration, and era

- Blériot S.510
- Boeing P-26 Peashooter
- Fiat CR.32
- Gloster Gladiator
- Hawker Fury
- Heinkel He 51
- Mitsubishi A5M
- PZL P.11

Related lists

- List of interwar military aircraft
- List of aircraft of the Spanish Republican Air Force
- List of aircraft of the French Air Force during World War II
- List of aircraft of World War II
