= Hispano-Suiza piston aero-engines =

Hispano-Suiza piston aero-engines were predominantly piston engines produced by Hispano-Suiza in France, Spain, and under licence in the United Kingdom, the United States and Russia from the First World War through to the 1950s. Development of these engines started with the very successful V-8 engines which introduced many new features which ensured the success of the Hispano-Suiza line.

== Designations ==
=== Letter system ===
The Service technique de l'aéronautique (STAé) used a common designation system for the vast majority of engines produced in France, which signified the major attributes of the particular engines:-

1. Manufacturer - In this case Hispano-Suiza
2. 12 - the number of cylinders in any configuration (V, straight, W, horizontally opposed, radial, etc.).
3. Y - the family letter in capitals (note: in at least two instances the family designator consisted of two letters in capitals e.g. 14AA and 14AB), advancing alphabetically. (note:Hispano-Suiza avoided W to avoid confusion with W / Broad-arrow engines)
4. a – sub variant indicator, (which could also indicate the rotation of the engine, where otherwise identical engines with opposite hand rotation were built, e.g. 12Ndr anti-clockwise and 12Nfr clockwise).
5. r – attribute indicators, denoting various attributes that the engine might have, (r = reduction gearing, i = fuel injection, s = supercharged, etc.)
6. 1 - sub-sub variants were denoted by using a number after the letters, (e.g. 12Xhrs and 12Xhrs1), usually indicating differences in ancillary equipment.

Thus the 12Xgrs was of the X family, with reduction gearing and supercharger, whereas the 12Xhrs was identical but rotated in the opposite direction.

==== Number system ====
The STAé introduced a numbered attribute indicator from the late 1930s, thus;

12Y-26, 12Y-27 – left and right rotation versions of the same engine.

Basic versions of each engine had even numbers and opposite rotation version were odd numbered.

== List of H-S piston aero-engines ==
Data from:Moteurs d'Aviation Hispano-Suiza

Livre d'Or de la Société Française Hispano-Suiza

Hispano-Suiza:Revue et Bulletin Technique de la Société Française Hispano-Suiza Jun 28

Hispano-Suiza:Revue et Bulletin Technique de la Société Française Hispano-Suiza Jan 28

Hispano-Suiza:Revue et Bulletin Technique de la Société Française Hispano-Suiza Nov 29

Hispano-Suiza:Revue et Bulletin Technique de la Société Française Hispano-Suiza Dec 30

Hispano-Suiza:Revue et Bulletin Technique de la Société Française Hispano-Suiza Jun 30

Hispano-Suiza:Revue et Bulletin Technique de la Société Française Hispano-Suiza Nov 31

Hispano-Suiza:Revue et Bulletin Technique de la Société Française Hispano-Suiza Apr 32

Hispano-Suiza:Revue et Bulletin Technique de la Société Française Hispano-Suiza Oct 32

Hispano-Suiza:Revue et Bulletin Technique de la Société Française Hispano-Suiza Jan-Jun 35

Le moteur-canon V8 Hispano-Suiza

HISPANO-SUIZA:LES MOTEURS DE TOUS LES RECORDS

Aviafrance

5Q

6M
6Mb
6Mbr

6P
6Pa

8A
8Aa
8Ab

8B
8Ba
8Bb
8Bc
8Bd
8Be
8Bec

8C
8Cb

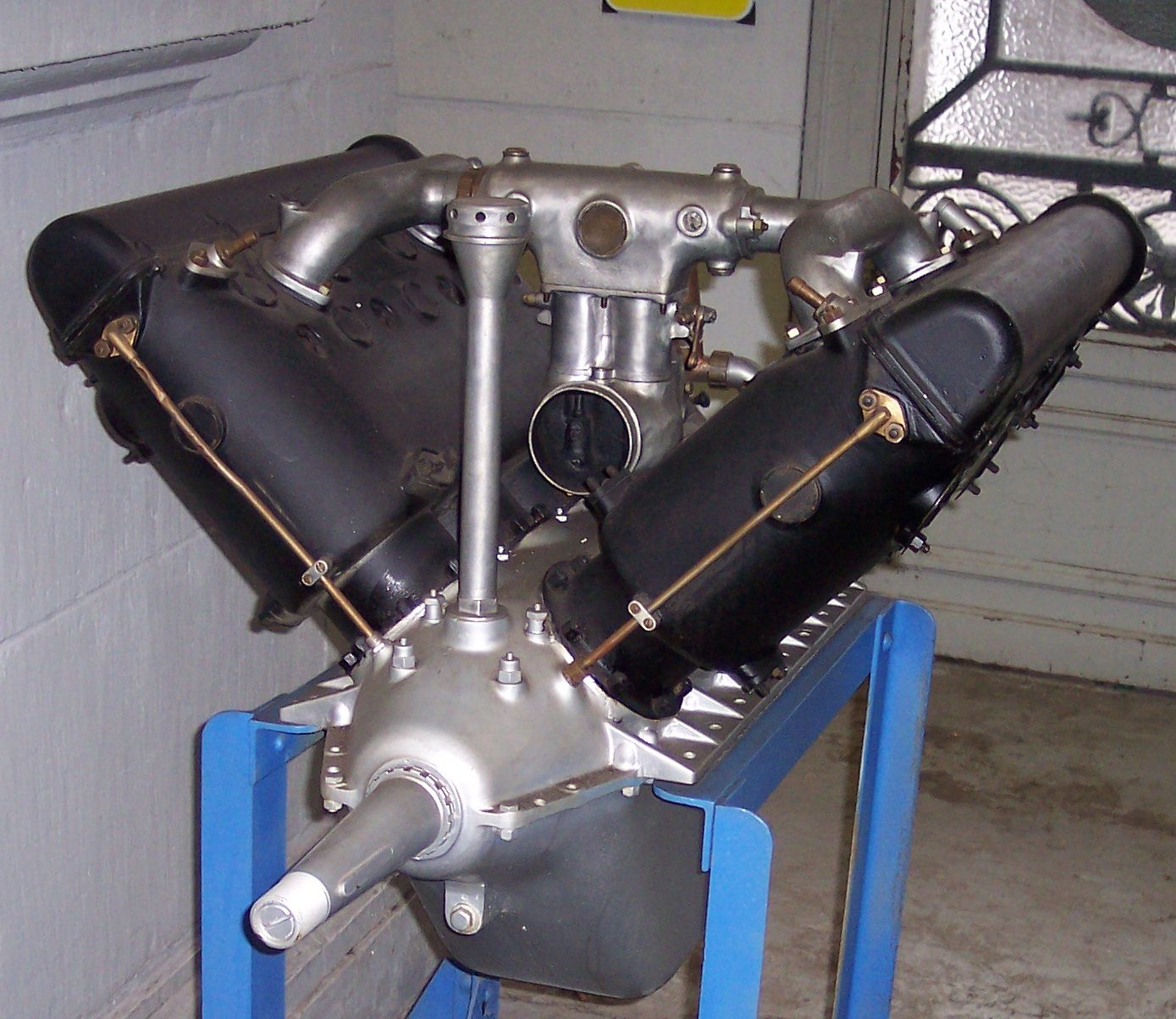
A Hispano-Suiza 8 on display

8F
8Fa
8Fb
8Fe

9Q
9Qa
9Qb
9Qc
9Qd
9Qdr

9T
Produced under licence from Clerget, derived from the Clerget 9C, diesel radial engine.

9V
9Vr
9Vb
9Vbr
9Vbrs
9Vbs
9Vd
9V-10
9V-11
9V-16
9V-17

12B
(1945)

12F
12Fd

12G
(Type 50)
12Ga
12Gb

12H
(Type 51)
12Ha
12Hb
12Hbr
12Hbxr

12J
(Type 52)
12Ja
12Jb

12K
Kb
Kbrs

12L
Lb
Lbr
Lbxr

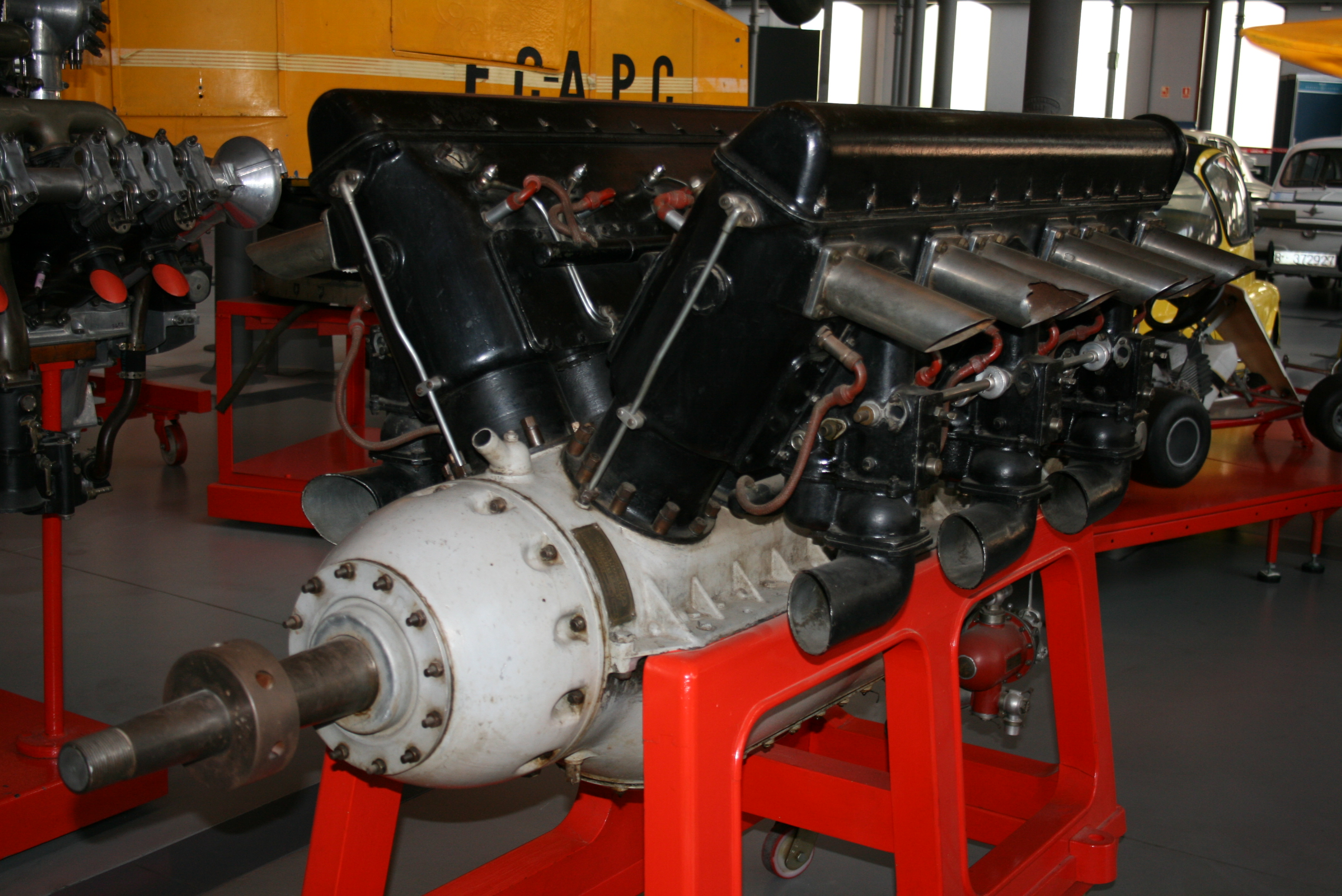
A 12Lbr on display at theMuseu de la Ciencia i la Tècnica de Catalunya in Spain

12M
(Type 57)
12Mb/500
12Mb/500r
12Mc/500
12Mcr/500
12Md
12Mdr
12Mdsh

12N
(Type 61)
12Nb/650
12Nbr/650
12Nbrs/650
12Nc
12cNr:
12Ndr
12Ner
12Nfr
12Ngr
12Ns
12Nsr
12Ns Special
12Nsr Special

12X
(Type 72)
12Xbr
12Xbrs
12Xbrg
12Xbr
12Xbrs
12Xbrs1
12Xdrs
12Xfrs
12Xgrs
12Xgrs1
12Xhrs
12Xhrs1
12Xirs
12Xjrs
(Type 76) with 20 mm (0.787 in) calibre Hispano-Suiza HS.404 cannon between cylinder banks, firing through propeller shaft.
12Xcrs
12Xers
12Xirs
12Xjrs
12Xirs1
12Xjrs1
12X-13

12Y
(Type 73)
12Ybr
12Ybrg
12Ybrs1
12Ygrs
12Ydr
12Ydrs
12Ydrs1
12Ydrs2
12Yfrs
12Yfrs1
12Yfrs2
12Y-21
12Y-25
12Y-26
12Y-27
12Y-28
12Y-29
12Y-38
12Y-39
(Type 77) with 20 mm Hispano-Suiza HS.404 cannon between cylinder banks, firing through propeller shaft.
12Ybrs
12Ycrs
12Y-28
12Y-29
12Y-30
12Y-31
12Y-32
12Y-33
12Y-36
12Y-37
12Y-41
12Y-45
12Y-47
12Y 49
12Y-50
12Y-51

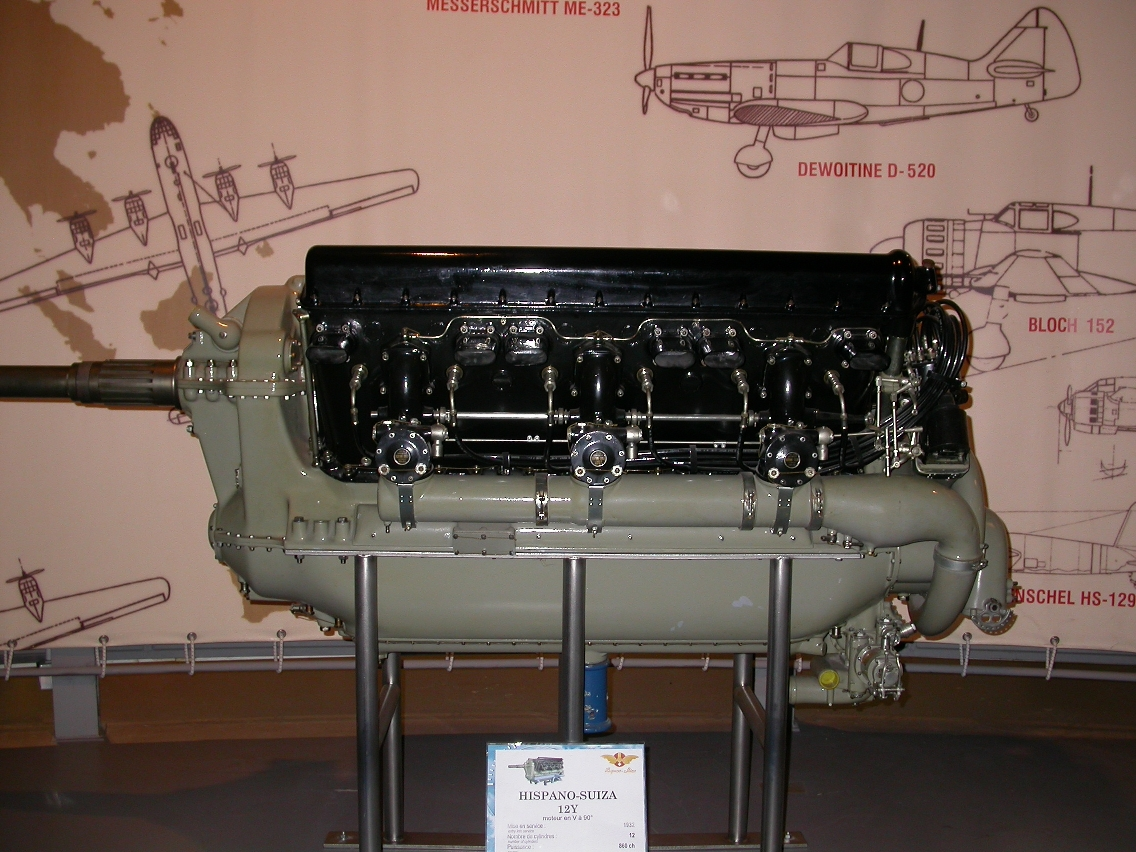
A Hispano-Suiza 12Y-31

12Z

(Type 89)

12Z-1
12Z-17
12Z-89

14AA
(Type 79)
14AA-00
14AA-01
14AA-02
14AA-03
14AA-04
14AA-05
14AA-06
14AA-07

14AB
14AB-12
14AB-13

14H
14Ha-7a
14Hbs
14Hbrs

14U
Produced under licence from Clerget, derived from the Clerget 14F, diesel radial engine.

Hispano Suiza 400hp V-16 120 mm × 130 mm (4.7 in × 5.1 in)

Hispano Suiza 600hp V-16 140 mm × 150 mm (5.5 in × 5.9 in)

18R

18S
18Sb
18Sbr

24Y
(Types 82 and 90)

24Z (Type 95)

36Y

48H

48Z

Whirlwind

Abadal 12Y
(HS 8 with a third inverted vertical bank) 260–300 kW (350–400 hp) at 2,500 rpm, with reduction gear, weighing 340 kg (750 lb).

== Hispano-Suiza in-house Type designations ==
Data from:

The Hispano-Suiza Type numbers were used for all Hispano-Suiza products, including cars trucks and engines: Types 21, 22 and 23 are known to have been cars.

Type 31
Prototype, (bxs 120 mm × 120 mm (4.72 in × 4.72 in)), with mixed cooling (11 fins) and initial production 8A, (bxs 120 mm × 120 mm (4.72 in × 4.72 in)), with 8 cooling fins, 1,450 rpm, 110 kW (150 hp).

Type 34
8Aa, 1800 rpm, 4.7:1 compression, 110 kW (150 hp), 100% water-cooling.

Type 34-S
(S for surcomprimé) 8Ab, 1800 rpm, 5.3:1 compression, 130 kW (180 hp), 100% water-cooling.

Type 35
8B, 2,000 rpm, 150 kW (200 hp), geared.

Type 35-S
(S for surcomprimé) 8B, 2,000 rpm, 160 kW (220 hp), high compression, geared.

Type 36
8B with Lewis gun

Type 38
8BeC, Type 36 with a modified 37 mm (1.457 in) SAMC Model 37 cannon

Type 39
Coupled 150 kW (200 hp) engines

Type 40
(8E ?)

Type 41
(8A ?)

Type 42
8Fb, (bxs 140 mm × 150 mm (5.51 in × 5.91 in)), 18.48 L (1,128 cu in), 220 kW (300 hp) at 1,800 rpm.

Type 42VS
8Fe

Type 43
cannon equipped project

Type 44
A later, little used, moteur-canon version.

Type 45
37 mm (1.457 in) cannon

Type 50
12G

Type 51
12H

Type 52
12J

Type 57
12M

Type 61
12N

Type 72
12X

Type 73
12Y

Type 76
12X with cannon

Type 77
12Y with cannon

Type 79
14AA

Type 82
24Y

Type 89
12Z

Type 90
24Y

Type 95
24Z

Type 96
48Z

== Specifications ==
Data from: This table gives the major attributes of each engine model, where known.

Model	Bore	Stroke	Capacity	Comp.	Wt. dry	T/O pr	T/O rpm	S. charger	Red. gear	Rated pr	Rated rpm	Rated alt	Comments
5Q	127 mm (5.00 in)	140 mm (5.51 in)	8.9 L (543.11 cu in)	5.1	186 kg (410.1 lb)	130 kW (180 hp)		n	DD	123 kW (165 hp)	2,000	S/L	5-cyl. Radial
6Pa	110 mm (4.33 in)	140 mm (5.51 in)	7.97 L (486.36 cu in)	5.5	150 kg (330.7 lb)	110 kW (150 hp)	2,100	n	DD				6 cyl. In-line water-cooled
6Mb	130 mm (5.12 in)	170 mm (6.69 in)	13.54 L (826.26 cu in)	6	250 kg (551.2 lb)	220 kW (300 hp)	2,100	n	DD				6 cyl. In-line water-cooled
6Mbr	130 mm (5.12 in)	170 mm (6.69 in)	13.54 L (826.26 cu in)	6	290 kg (639.3 lb)	220 kW (290 hp)	2,100	n	0.5:1				6 cyl. In-line water-cooled
8Aa	120 mm (4.72 in)	140 mm (5.51 in)	11.8 L (720.08 cu in)	4.7	195 kg (429.9 lb)	130 kW (175 hp)	2,100	n	DD				V-8 90°
8Ab	120 mm (4.72 in)	140 mm (5.51 in)	11.8 L (720.08 cu in)	5.3	195 kg (429.9 lb)	175 kW (235 hp)	2,100	n	DD				V-8 90°
8Ad	120 mm (4.72 in)	130 mm (5.12 in)	10.9 L (665.16 cu in)	5.3	210 kg (463.0 lb)	160 kW (210 hp)	2,100	n	DD				V-8 90°
8Fb	140 mm (5.51 in)	150 mm (5.91 in)	18.48 L (1,127.72 cu in)	5.3	270 kg (595.2 lb)	257 kW (345 hp)	2,100	n	DD				V-8 90°
8Fe	140 mm (5.51 in)	150 mm (5.91 in)	18.48 L (1,127.72 cu in)	5.5	275 kg (606.3 lb)	280 kW (370 hp)	2,100	n	DD				V-8 90°
9Qa	127 mm (5.00 in)	140 mm (5.51 in)	16 L (976.38 cu in)	5.1	272 kg (599.7 lb)	230 kW (308 hp)		n	DD	190 kW (250 hp)	2,000	S/L	9-cyl. Radial
9Qb	127 mm (5.00 in)	140 mm (5.51 in)	15.96 L (973.94 cu in)	5.1	272 kg (599.7 lb)	214 kW (287 hp)		n	DD	170 kW (230 hp)	1,800	S/L	9-cyl. Radial
9Qc	127 mm (5.00 in)	140 mm (5.51 in)	15.96 L (973.94 cu in)	6	272 kg (599.7 lb)	312 kW (418 hp)		n	DD	220 kW (300 hp)	2,200	S/L	9-cyl. Radial
9Qcx	127 mm (5.00 in)	140 mm (5.51 in)	16 L (976.38 cu in)	5.1	272 kg (599.7 lb)	287 kW (385 hp)		n	DD	220 kW (300 hp)	2,200	S/L	9-cyl. Radial
9Qdr	127 mm (5.00 in)	140 mm (5.51 in)	16 L (976.38 cu in)	6	297 kg (654.8 lb)	300 kW (400 hp)		n	0.615:1	260 kW (350 hp)	2,200	S/L	9-cyl. radial
9V	155.6 mm (6.13 in)	174.7 mm (6.88 in)	29.8 L (1,818.51 cu in)	5.3	390 kg (859.8 lb)	480 kW (650 hp)		n	DD	429 kW (575 hp)	1,900	S/L	9-cyl. Radial
9Vr	155.6 mm (6.13 in)	174.7 mm (6.88 in)	29.8 L (1,818.51 cu in)	5.3	417 kg (919.3 lb)	480 kW (650 hp)		n	0.63:1	429 kW (575 hp)	1,950	S/L	9-cyl. radial
9T	130 mm (5.12 in)	170 mm (6.69 in)	20.34 L (1,241.22 cu in)	16	330 kg (727.5 lb)	300 kW (400 hp)	2,100	n	DD	220 kW (300 hp)	1,900	S/L	9-cyl. radial diesel engine
12Ga	140 mm (5.51 in)	150 mm (5.91 in)	27.712 L (1,691.09 cu in)	5.3			2,100	n	DD		1,800	S/L	W-12, 3x twin carbs
12Gb	140 mm (5.51 in)	150 mm (5.91 in)	27.712 L (1,691.09 cu in)	6	390 kg (859.8 lb)	450 kW (610 hp)	2,100	n			2,000	S/L	W-12, 3x twin carbs, 300 built
12Ha	140 mm (5.51 in)	150 mm (5.91 in)	27.712 L (1,691.09 cu in)	5.3	415 kg (914.9 lb)	400 kW (540 hp)	2,100	n	DD	340 kW (450 hp)	1,800	S/L	6x twin carbs
12Hb	140 mm (5.51 in)	150 mm (5.91 in)	27.712 L (1,691.09 cu in)	6	415 kg (914.9 lb)	459 kW (615 hp)	2,100	n	DD	370 kW (500 hp)	2,000	S/L	6x twin carbs, 750 built
12Hbr	140 mm (5.51 in)	150 mm (5.91 in)	27.712 L (1,691.09 cu in)	6	460 kg (1,014.1 lb)	440 kW (590 hp)	2,100	n	0.5:1	370 kW (500 hp)	2,000	S/L	6x twin carbs
12Ja	120 mm (4.72 in)	150 mm (5.91 in)	20.36 L (1,242.44 cu in)	5.3	355 kg (782.6 lb)	290 kW (390 hp)	2,100	n	DD	260 kW (350 hp)	1,800	S/L	
12Jb	120 mm (4.72 in)	150 mm (5.91 in)	20.36 L (1,242.44 cu in)	6	355 kg (782.6 lb)	347 kW (465 hp)	2,100	N	DD	300 kW (400 hp)	2,000	S/L	
12Kb	140 mm (5.51 in)	170 mm (6.69 in)	31.4 L (1,916.15 cu in)	6	415 kg (914.9 lb)		2,100	n	DD	450 kW (600 hp)	2,000	S/L	W-12 60°
12Lb	140 mm (5.51 in)	170 mm (6.69 in)	31.4 L (1,916.15 cu in)	6:1	420 kg (925.9 lb)	494 kW (662 hp)	2,100	n		450 kW (600 hp)	2,000	S/L	
12Lbr	140 mm (5.51 in)	170 mm (6.69 in)	31.4 L (1,916.15 cu in)	6:1	420 kg (925.9 lb)	480 kW (640 hp)	2,100	n	0.5:1	450 kW (600 hp)	2,000	S/L	
12Mb	130 mm (5.12 in)	170 mm (6.69 in)	27.08 L (1,652.52 cu in)	6	400 kg (881.8 lb)		2,100	n	DD	370 kW (500 hp)	2,000	S/L	6x twin carbs, 600 built
12Mbr	130 mm (5.12 in)	170 mm (6.69 in)	27.08 L (1,652.52 cu in)	6	445 kg (981.1 lb)	370 kW (500 hp)	2,000	n	0.5:1	430 kW (570 hp)	1,950	S/L	6x twin carbs
12Mc	130 mm (5.12 in)	170 mm (6.69 in)	27.08 L (1,652.52 cu in)	7	400 kg (881.8 lb)	480 kW (640 hp)	2,200	n	DD	370 kW (500 hp)	2,000	S/L	6x twin carbs
12Nb	150 mm (5.91 in)	170 mm (6.69 in)	36.054 L (2,200.15 cu in)	6.2:1	455 kg (1,003 lb)		2,100	n	DD	480 kW (650 hp)	2,000	S/L	6x Zenith twin carbs
12Nbr	150 mm (5.91 in)	170 mm (6.69 in)	36.054 L (2,200.15 cu in)	6.2:1	500 kg (1,100 lb)	550 kW (740 hp)	2,100	n	0.5:1	480 kW (650 hp)	2,000	S/L	6x Zenith twin carbs
12Nbrs	150 mm (5.91 in)	170 mm (6.69 in)	36.054 L (2,200.15 cu in)	6.2:1	675 kg (1,488 lb)			y		480 kW (650 hp)	1,950	S/L	6x Zenith twin carbs, 11,700 built
12Xbr	130 mm (5.12 in)	170 mm (6.69 in)	27.08 L (1,652.52 cu in)	6.4:1	355 kg (783 lb)	450 kW (610 hp)	2,200	n	0.666:1				
12Xbrg	130 mm (5.12 in)	170 mm (6.69 in)	27.08 L (1,652.52 cu in)	5.8:1	370 kg (820 lb)	500 kW (670 hp)	2,400	n	0.666:1	660 kW (880 hp)	2,400		with Gaveur (mixture distributor)
12Xbrs	130 mm (5.12 in)	170 mm (6.69 in)	27.08 L (1,652.52 cu in)	5.8:1	370 kg (820 lb)	450 kW (600 hp)	2,600	y	0.666:1	480 kW (650 hp)	2,600		6x Zenith single carbs
12Xirs	130 mm (5.12 in)	170 mm (6.69 in)	27.08 L (1,652.52 cu in)	5.8:1	385 kg (849 lb)	480 kW (650 hp)	2,600	y	y				6x Zenith single carbs, 800 built, 85 Octane
12Ybr	150 mm (5.91 in)	170 mm (6.69 in)	36.054 L (2,200.15 cu in)	6.4:1	415 kg (915 lb)	585 kW (785 hp)	2,200	n	0.666:1				
12Ybrg	150 mm (5.91 in)	170 mm (6.69 in)	36.054 L (2,200.15 cu in)	5.8:1	430 kg (950 lb)	660 kW (880 hp)	2,400	n	0.666:1	690 kW (925 hp)	2,400		with Gaveur (mixture distributor)
12Ybrs	150 mm (5.91 in)	170 mm (6.69 in)	36.054 L (2,200.15 cu in)	5.8:1		600 kW (800 hp)	2,400	y	0.666:1		2,400		
12Y-30/-31	150 mm (5.91 in)	170 mm (6.69 in)	36.054 L (2,200.15 cu in)		520 kg (1,150 lb)	620 kW (830 hp)	2,400	y	0.666:1	640 kW (860 hp)	2,400	3,300 m (10,800 ft)	-30 LH rotation, -31 RH rotation, with cannon
12Y-32/-33	150 mm (5.91 in)	170 mm (6.69 in)	36.054 L (2,200.15 cu in)		500 kg (1,100 lb)	720 kW (960 hp)	2,400	y	0.666:1	712 kW (955 hp)	2,400	2,300 m (7,500 ft)	-32 LH rotation, -33 RH rotation
12Y-36/-37	150 mm (5.91 in)	170 mm (6.69 in)	36.054 L (2,200.15 cu in)		520 kg (1,150 lb)	780 kW (1,050 hp)	2,400	y	0.55:1	720 kW (970 hp)	2,400	2,300 m (7,500 ft)	-36 LH rotation, -37 RH rotation
12Y-50/-51	150 mm (5.91 in)	170 mm (6.69 in)	36.054 L (2,200.15 cu in)	7:1	492 kg (1,085 lb)	820 kW (1,100 hp)	2,500	y	0.666:1	750 kW (1,000 hp)	2,500	3,300 m (10,800 ft)	-50 LH rotation, -51 RH rotation
12Z-1	150 mm (5.91 in)	170 mm (6.69 in)	36.054 L (2,200.15 cu in)	7:1	620 kg (1,370 lb)	1,300 kW (1,800 hp)	2,800	y 2-speed	0.60:1	high 980 kW (1,320 hp)	2,800	8,000 m (26,000 ft)	with cannon
18Sb	150 mm (5.91 in)	170 mm (6.69 in)	54 L (3,295.28 cu in)	6.2	590 kg (1,300.7 lb)	839 kW (1,125 hp)	2,100	n	DD	750 kW (1,000 hp)	2,000	S/L	W-18 80°
18Sbr	150 mm (5.91 in)	170 mm (6.69 in)	54 L (3,295.28 cu in)	6.2	615 kg (1,355.8 lb)	839 kW (1,125 hp)	2,100	n	0.5:1	750 kW (1,000 hp)	2,000	S/L	W-18 80°
14U	140 mm (5.51 in)	170 mm (6.69 in)	36.6 L (2,233.47 cu in)	16	510 kg (1,124.4 lb)	480 kW (640 hp)	2,200	n	DD	370 kW (500 hp)	1,900	S/L	14-cyl. radial diesel engine
14AA-00 / -01	155.6 mm (6.13 in)	170 mm (6.69 in)	36.6 L (2,233.47 cu in)	6.2	585 kg (1,289.7 lb)	771 kW (1,034 hp)		y (5.95:1)	DD	750 kW (1,000 hp)	2,100	1,550 m (5,090 ft)	14-cyl. radial, -00 RH -01 LH
14AA-02 / -03	155.6 mm (6.13 in)	170 mm (6.69 in)	36.6 L (2,233.47 cu in)	6.2	630 kg (1,388.9 lb)	771 kW (1,034 hp)		y (5.95:1)	0.625	750 kW (1,000 hp)	2,100	1,550 m (5,090 ft)	14-cyl. radial, -02 RH -03 LH
14AA-04 / -05	155.6 mm (6.13 in)	170 mm (6.69 in)	36.6 L (2,233.47 cu in)	6.2	630 kg (1,388.9 lb)	804 kW (1,078 hp)		y (10:1)	0.625	820 kW (1,100 hp)	2,125	3,000 m (9,800 ft)	14-cyl. radial, -04 RH -05 LH
14AA-06 / -07	155.6 mm (6.13 in)	170 mm (6.69 in)	36.6 L (2,233.47 cu in)	6.2	595 kg (1,311.8 lb)	804 kW (1,078 hp)		y (10:1)	DD	820 kW (1,100 hp)	2,125	3,000 m (9,800 ft)	14-cyl. radial, -06 RH -07 LH
J-5 Whirlwind	115 mm (4.53 in)	139.7 mm (5.50 in)	13 L (793.31 cu in)		230 kg (507.1 lb)	150 kW (200 hp)	1,800	n	DD				Licence-built Wright J-5

== Applications and chronology ==
Chronology of Hispano-Suiza aero-engines and a selection of their applications
Year	Aircraft	Role	Engine(s)	no. built
1922	Breguet XIX B.2	Two-seat bomber	1x12Hb	4,000
1922	Nieuport-Delage NiD 43	Seaplane fighter	1x12Hb	1
1923	CAMS 38	Schneider Cup racer	1x12Fd	1
1924	Potez 26	Single-seat bomber / attack aircraft	1x12Ha	1
1926	Avimeta 88	Two-seat fighter	1x 12Hb	1
1926	Nieuport-Delage NiD 42	Fighter	1x 12Hb	25
1926	Levasseur PL.7	Shipborne Torpedo-bomber	1x 12Lbr	41
1927	Morane-Saulnier MoS-121	Light fighter	1x 12Jb	1
1927	Nieuport-Delage NiD.52	Fighter	1x 12Hb	125
1928	Latécoère 32.3	Postal transport flying boat	1x 12Hbr	6
1928	Nieuport-Delage NiD.62	Fighter	1x 12Hb; 1x 12Mc (Nid.628); 1x 12Mdsh (Nid.629)	691
1926	Blériot 127.1	4-seat multi-role combat aircraft	2x 12Gb (127.1); 2x 12Hb (127.2 BCR)	43
1928	Nieuport-Delage NiD.62	Fighter	1x 12Hb (NiD.62/621/622); 1x 12Hdr (NiD.626); 1x 12Mc (NiD.628); 1x 12Mdsh (NiD.629)	675
1928	Breguet 284T	8-seat airliner	1x 12Lbrx	8
1928	C.A.M.S. 53	Postal flying boat transport	2x 12Hbr (C.A.M.S. 53); 2x 12Lbrx (C.A.M.S. 53/1); 2x 12Lbr (C.A.M.S. 53/2)	31
1929	Bernard 20	Fighter	1x 12Jb	1
1929	Nieuport-Delage NiD.72	Fighter	1x 12Hb	25
1929	Levasseur PL.14	Shipborne torpedo-bomber	1x 12Nb	30
1929	Levasseur PL.10	Reconnaissance	1x 12Lb	160
1929	Latécoère 28	Transport 8 passengers	1x 12Hbr (Laté 28.1); 1x 12Nbr (Laté 28.2); 1x 12Lbr (Laté 28.3); 1x 12Nb (Laté 28.6); 1x 12Nbr (Laté 28.5, 28.8)	36
1929	Potez 390	Observation	1x 12Hb	240
1930	Breguet Br 270	Bomber	1x 12Hb	150
1930	Dewoitine D.27	Fighter	1x 12Mb	80
1930	Dewoitine D.33 Trait d'union	long-distance record breaker	1x 12Nb; 3x 9V (D.332 Emeraude); 3x 9V-10 (D.333); 3x 9V-17 (D.338)	1
1930	Dewoitine D.35	Transport	1x 9Q	
1931	Dewoitine D.530	Fighter	1x12Md (D.530); 1x12Md (D.531); 1x12Xbrs (D.535)	6
1931	Latécoère 290	Bomber land/floatplane	1x 12Nbr (Laté 290); 1x 18Sbr (Laté 291 / 292 / 295); 1x 12Ycrs (Laté 296); 1x 12Ybrs (Laté 297)	35
1931	Latécoère 35.0	Transport 10 passengers	3x 12Jb	1
1931	Blériot 125	Transport 12 passengers	2x 12Hbr	1
1931	C.A.M.S. 58	Transport 6 passengers	2x 12Nbr ( C.A.M.S. 58.0, 58.3)	3 (+1x 58.2)
1932	Bernard 260	Fighter	1x 12Xbrs	1
1932	Dewoitine D.500	Fighter	1x 12Xcrs	260
1932	Dewoitine D.560	Fighter	1x 12Xbrs	1
1932	Lioré et Olivier H.256	Patrol floatplane	2x 12Nbr	5
1932	Morane-Saulnier MS.325	Fighter	1x 12Xcrs	1
1932	Nieuport-Delage NiD.122	Fighter	1x 12Xbrs (NiD.122); 1x 12Hbrs (NiD.124); 1x 12Ycrs (NiD.125)	3 (HS powered)
1932	Levasseur PL.15	Reconnaissance	1x 12Nbr	16
1932	Latécoère 500	Transport transatlantic	3x 12Jb ( Laté 500 / 501)	2
1933	Latécoère 300	Postal transport flying-boat	4x 12Nbr ( Laté 300 / 301); 4x 12Ydrs ( Laté 302)	7
1933	Couzinet 70	Transport transatlantic	3x 12Nb	1
1933	Blériot 5190	Postal transport flying-boat	4x 12Nbr	1
1934	Breguet 530 Saigon	Transport flying-boat	3x 12Ybr	5
1934	Loire 130	Ship-borne reconnaissance flying-boat	1x 12Xirs	125
1934	Potez 540	Reconnaissance-bomber	2x 12Xirs	185
1934	Blériot-SPAD S.510	Fighter	1x 12Xbrs	80
1935	Dewoitine D.510	Fighter	1x12Ybrs	121
1935	Dewoitine D.513	Fighter	1x12Ycrs	1
1935	Latécoère 520	Transport transatlantic	4x 18Sbr (Laté 520); 6x 12Ydrs (Laté 521); 6x 12Y-37 (Laté 522); 6x 12Y-27 (Laté 523)	0x 520, 1x 522, 3x 523
1935	Nieuport Ni-140	Dive-bomber	2x 12Xcrs	2
1936	Potez 621	Transport 7 passengers	2x 12Xirs	10 + 3 conversions
1936	Farman F.220	Postal transport	4x 12Lbr (F.220 / F.220B / F.220-0 / F.2220); 4x 12Xgrs (F.2220); 2x 14AA-08 +; 2x 14AA-09(F.223); 2x 12Xirs +; 2x 12Xjrs (F.2230 / F.2231); 2x 12Y-28 +; 2x 12Y-29 (F.2233); 2x 12Y-38 +; 2x 12Y-39 (F.2234)	9
1936	Latécoère 298	Torpedo-bomber floatplane / reconnaissance	1x 12Ycrs1	148
1937	Lioré et Olivier H-246	Transport flying-boat	4x 12Xgrs (H-246); 4x 12Xirs (H-246/1)	6
1937	Loire 102	Transatlantic transport flying-boat	4x 12 Kbrs1 or; 4x 12Xirs	1
1937	Bloch MB.160	Transport 16 passengers	4x 12Xirs	2
1938	Dewoitine D.520	Fighter	1x 12Y-45	900
1938	Morane-Saulnier MS.405	Fighter	1x 12Y-31	17
1938	ANF Les Mureaux 110	Observation 2-seater	1x 12Ycrs	297
1938	SNCAC NC.223	Night bomber	4x 14AA-08 (NC.233); 4x 12Xirs (NC.2230); 4x 12Y-29 (NC.2233); 4x 12Y-37 or 12Ydrs (NC.2234)	13
1938	Potez-CAMS 141	Transatlantic transport flying-boat	2x 12Y-26 +; 2x 12Y-27 or; 2x 12Y-36 +; 2x 12Y-37	1
1939	Dewoitine D.550	Fighter	1x 12Y-51	1
1939	Lioré et Olivier H-47	Transatlantic transport flying-boat	6x 12Ydrs (H-47); 6x 12Y-34 (H-470)	6
1939	Loire-Nieuport 40	Ship-borne dive-bomber	1x 12Xcrs (LN-40, LN-401, LN-411); 1x 12Y-31 (LN-402); 1x 12Y-51 (LN-42)	72
1939	Morane-Saulnier MS.406	Fighter	1x 12Y-45	1,000
1940	(Vernisse-Galtier) Arsenal VG-33	Fighter	1x 12Y-31	155
1940	Breguet 482 B.4	4-seat bomber	4x 12Z	2
1940	Morane-Saulnier MS.450	Fighter	1x 12Y-51	3
1940	Potez 230	Fighter	1x 12Y-31	1
1942	Potez-CAMS 161	Transatlantic transport flying-boat	3x 12Y-36 +; 3x 12Y-37	1
