= Nieuport-Delage NiD 42 =

Fighter aircraft built in France

NiD.42, 52, 62
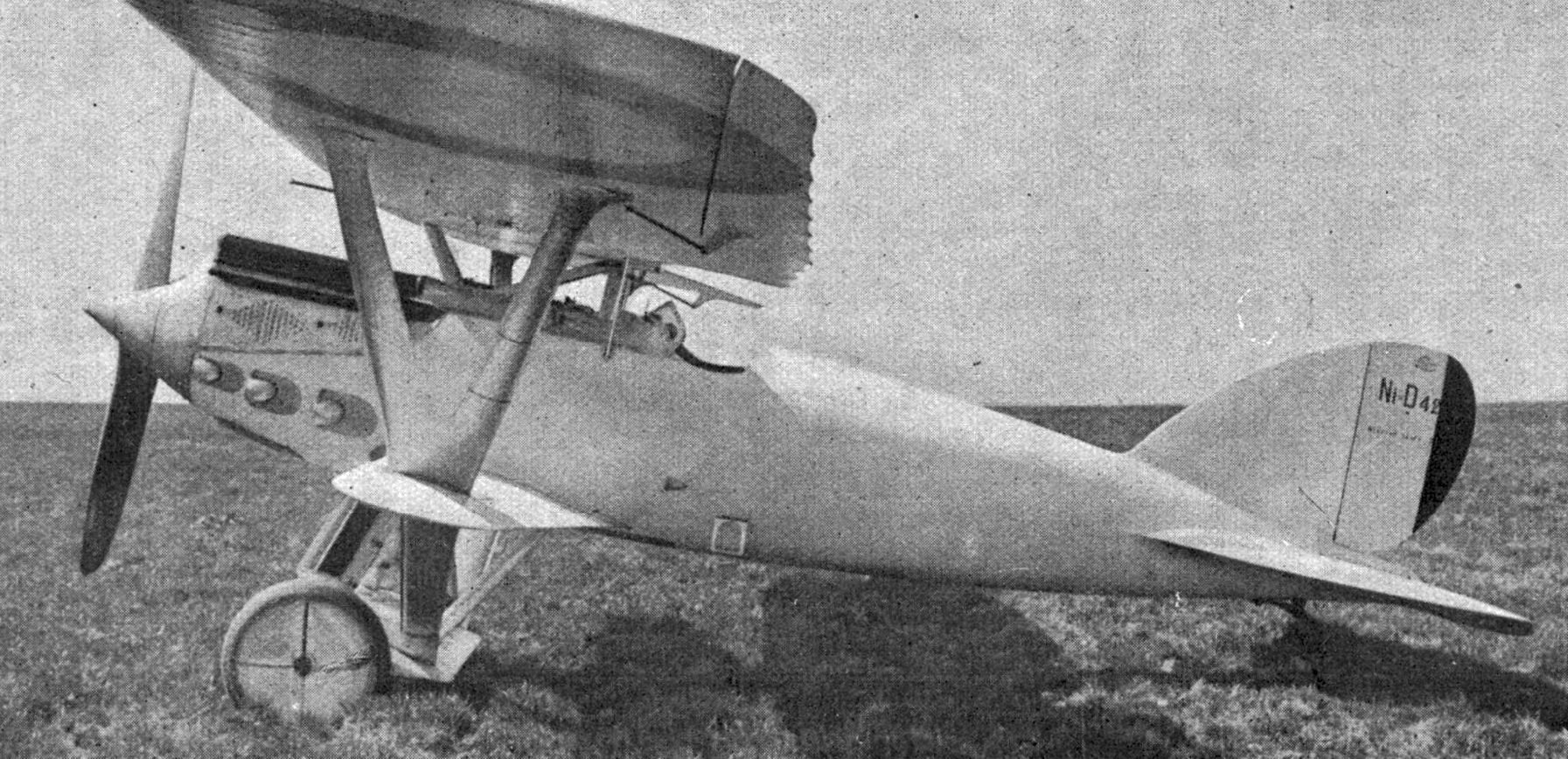
- Nieuport-Delage NiD.42.

General information
- Type: Fighter
- National origin: France
- Manufacturer: Nieuport-Delage
- Designer: Gustave Delage
- Status: retired
- Primary user: Aéronautique Militaire
- Number built: 882

History
- Introduction date: 1924
- First flight: 1924
- Retired: 1940
- Developed from: Nieuport-Delage Sesquiplan
- Variants: Nieuport-Delage NiD 52; Nieuport-Delage NiD 62

The Nieuport-Delage NiD 42 was a fighter aircraft built in France in the early 1920s, the first in a family of designs that would form the backbone of the French fighter force over the next decade.

== Design and development ==
As first built, the NiD 42 was a highly streamlined parasol-wing monoplane with a monocoque fuselage and an open cockpit of which a single prototype was built. Soon afterwards, Nieuport-Delage built two examples of a modified version for the 1924 Coupe Beaumont as the NiD 42S, on which the main wings were mounted directly to the sides of the upper fuselage at shoulder position with a short subsidiary wing fitted around the undercarriage axle. To further streamline the design, the surface radiators were installed on the upper surface of the wing.

== Operational history ==
One of these aircraft was flown by Joseph Sadi-Lecointe in the race of 22 June and was the only one out of the five entrants to actually finish the course. Indeed, having finished the prescribed six laps of the 50 km (31 mi) course, Sadi-Lecointe flew another four laps to break the world speed record over a 500-km closed-course. His average speed in winning the Coupe Beaumont was 311 km/h (193 mph; 168 kn) and over the 500 km (310 mi) was 306 km/h (190 mph; 165 kn), beating the previous record for the latter by 36 km/h (22 mph; 19 kn). On 15 February the following year, Sadi Lecointe took a NiD 42S up to a speed of 375 km/h (233 mph; 202 kn) and went on to win the 1925 Coupe Beaumont with a NiD 42S on 18 October with an average speed of 313 km/h (194 mph; 169 kn).

While the NiD 42S was achieving these distinctions, development continued on the fighter version. Nieuport-Delage designed two further such variants in 1924; a single-seater designated NiD 42 C.1 and a similar machine with a second cockpit for a tail gunner with a machine gun in a ring mount, designated the NiD 42 C.2. One of the latter was exhibited at that year's Salon de l'Aéronautique, along with a NiD 42 C.1 nose section to illustrate an alternative engine mount. These differed from the original NiD 42 fighter in having a second, small wing added to the lower fuselage, turning the parasol monoplane into a sesquiplane, a design feature adopted from the NiD 37 which would be a key identifying feature through most of the versions developed from the 42.

Only two examples of the two-seater were built, but Nieuport-Delage entered the single-seater in the 1925 concours des monoplaces, a competition by the Army's Technical Service to find a replacement for the NiD 29. The NiD 42 was selected from a field of eleven competitors, and an order for 50 aircraft was placed, of which 25 were eventually delivered. Although impressive at the time it was designed, technology had already surpassed the NiD 42 when it entered service in 1928, particularly with regard to its wooden structure, and most of the development work associated with the design was made in an effort to cure it of a tendency to enter a flat spin. Nevertheless, it provided the foundation for further development as the NiD 52 and NiD 62.

== Variants ==
NiD 42
prototype single-seat parasol-wing monoplane fighter with 370 kW (500 hp) Hispano-Suiza 12Hb (one built)
NiD 42S
shoulder-wing monoplane racer with 450 kW (600 hp) Hispano-Suiza 12Hb (two built)
NiD 42 C.1

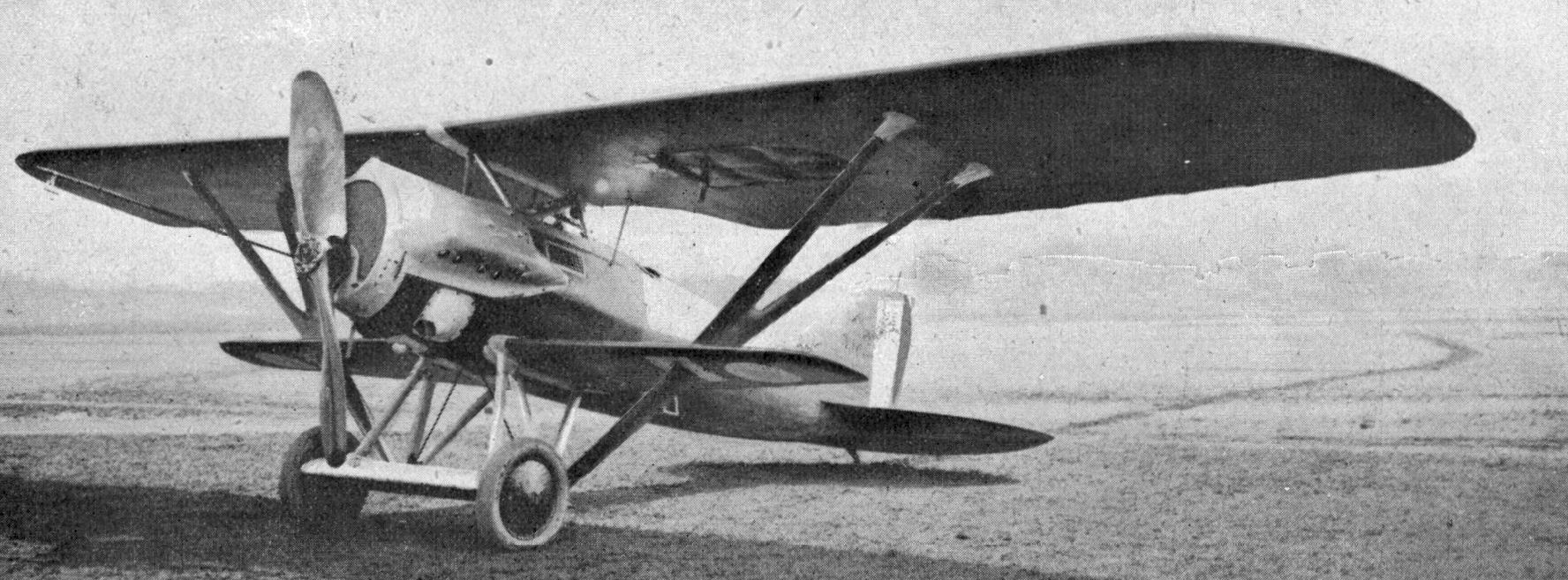
Nieuport Delage NiD 44 C.1 photo from L'Aéronautique January,1926

single-seat sesquiplane fighter with 370 kW (500 hp) Hispano-Suiza 12Hb (27 built, mostly for French AF, includes two for the Turkish Air Force
NiD 42 C.2
two-seat sesquiplane fighter with 370 kW (500 hp) Hispano-Suiza 12Hb (two built)
NiD 44 C.1
prototype sesquiplane fighter, powered by a 340 kW (450 hp) Lorraine 12Ew W-12 engine, to test alternate engine (one built)
NiD 46 C.1

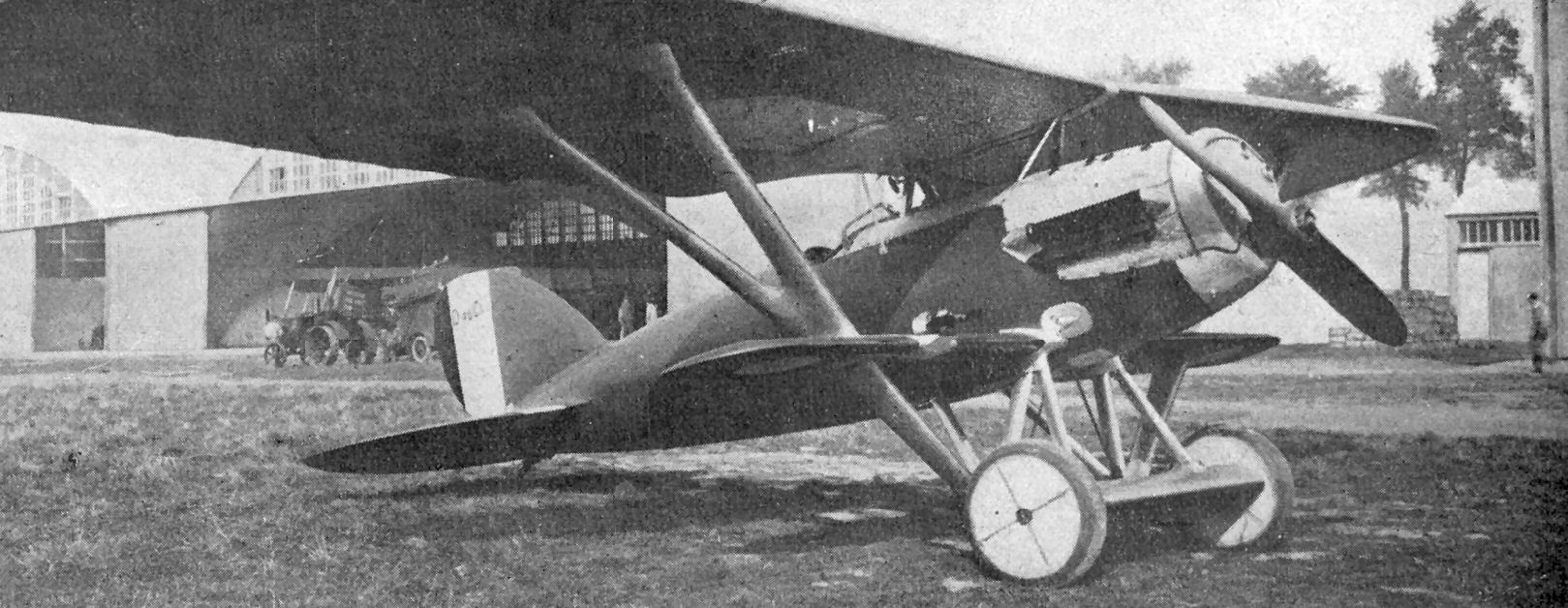
Nieuport Delage NiD 46 C.1 photo from L'Aéronautique January,1926

prototype sesquiplane fighter with 370 kW (500 hp) Hispano-Suiza 12Gb to test alternate engine (one built)
NiD 52 C.1
version for Spanish Air Force with 370 kW (500 hp) Hispano-Suiza 12Hb (126 built, including 125 under licence in Spain)
NiD 62 C.1
production fighter version for French military with 370 kW (500 hp) Hispano-Suiza 12Hb (322 built)
NiD 621
advanced trainer powered by a 370 kW (500 hp) Hispano-Suiza 12Hb (three built)
NiD 622
production fighter powered by a 370 kW (500 hp) Hispano-Suiza 12Hb (314 built)
NiD 623
speed record aircraft modified from 62 powered by a 450 kW (600 hp) Lorraine 12Fd Courlis W-12 engine, (one built)
NiD 624
experimental altitude aircraft powered by a 450 kW (600 hp) Lorraine 12Fd Courlis W-12 engine, (one built)
NiD 626
variant for Peru with 370 kW (500 hp) Lorraine 12Hdr V-12 engine (12 built)
NiD 628
testbed for testing Farman turbocharger powered by a 370 kW (500 hp) Hispano-Suiza 12Mc (two built)
NiD 629
production fighter powered by a 370 kW (500 hp) Hispano-Suiza 12Mdsh (50 built for French)
NiD 72 C.1
metalized version for Belgium and Brazil powered by a 450 kW (600 hp) Hispano-Suiza 12Lb (16 built for Brazil and Belgium)
NiD 82 C.1
metalized prototype with 450 kW (600 hp) Hispano-Suiza 12Lb and entirely new wing and tail (one built)

== Operators ==
Belgium

- Belgian Air Force

Brazil

- Brazilian Air Force

France

- Aéronautique Militaire
  - 2e Régiment d'Aviation
  - 3e Régiment d'Aviation
  - 38e Régiment d'Aviation
- French Aéronavale

Peru

- Peruvian Air Force

Spain

- Spanish Republican Air Force
- Aviación Nacional

Turkey

- Turkish Air Force

== Specifications (NiD 42 C1) ==
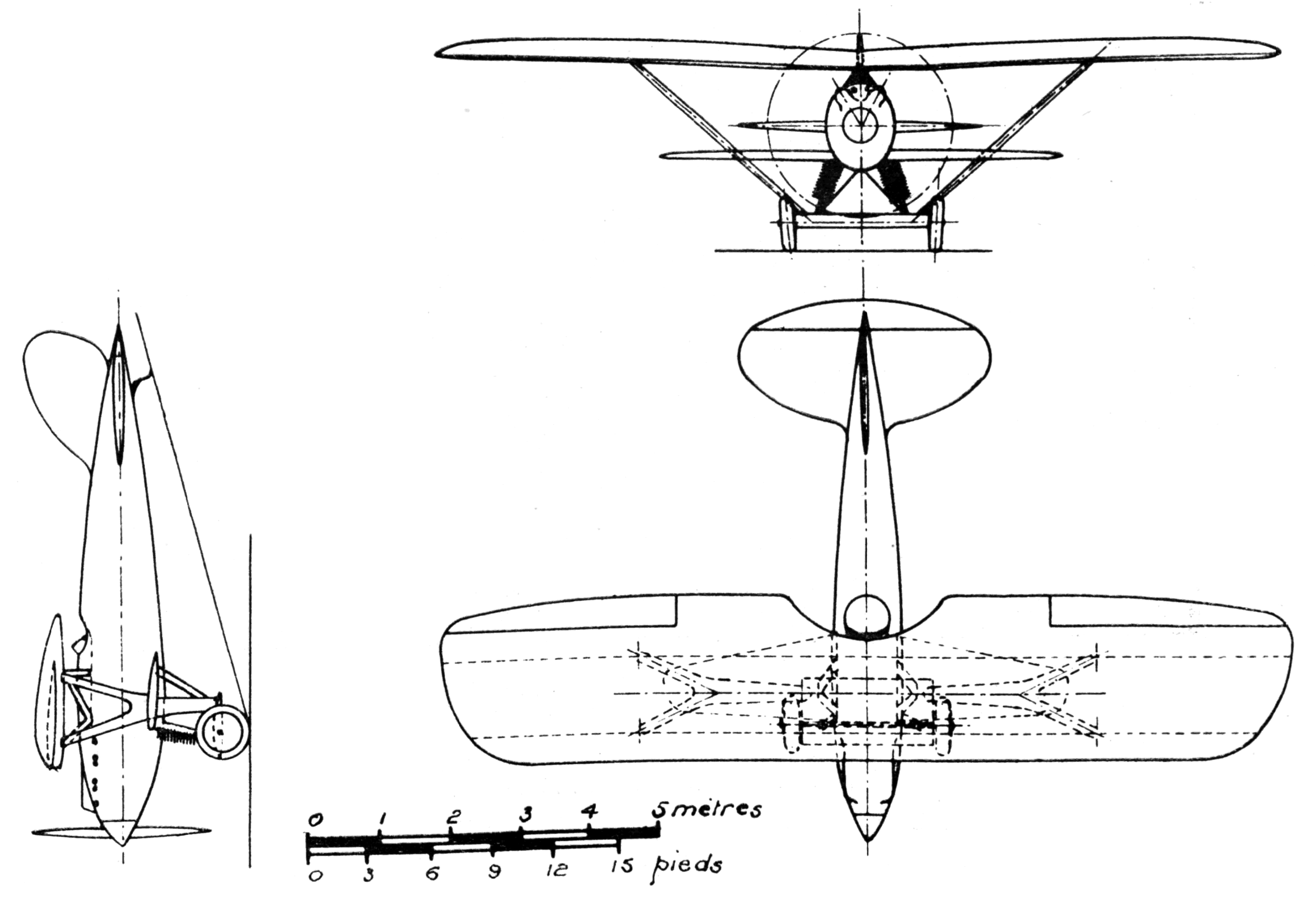
Nieuport Delage NiD 42 C.1 3-view drawing from L'Aéronautique August,1927

Data from "Nieuport-Delage NiD-42"

General characteristics

- Crew: One pilot
- Length: 7.50 m (24 ft 7 in)
- Wingspan: 12.00 m (39 ft 4 in)
- Height: 3.00 m (9 ft 10 in)
- Wing area: 30.9 m^{2} (332 sq ft)
- Empty weight: 1,260 kg (2,780 lb)
- Gross weight: 1,808 kg (3,998 lb)
- Powerplant: 1 × Hispano-Suiza 12Hb , 336 kW (450 hp)

Performance

- Maximum speed: 265 km/h (165 mph, 143 kn)
- Range: 400 km (250 mi, 220 nmi)
- Service ceiling: 7,325 m (24,000 ft)
- Rate of climb: 3.83 m/s (756.92 ft/min)

Armament

- 2 × fixed, forward-firing machine guns in wings
- 1 × fixed, forward-firing machine gun in engine cowling
