= Amiot 110 =

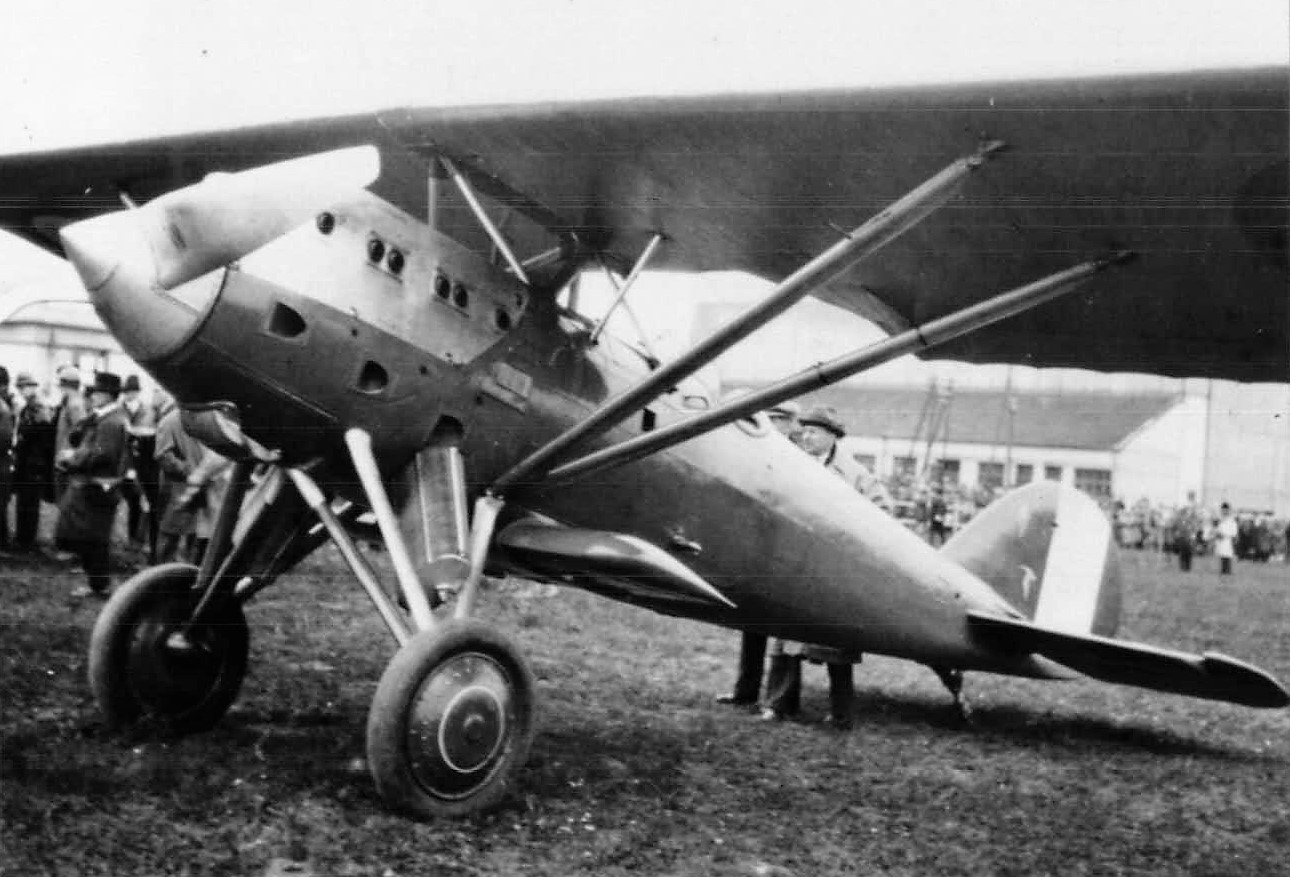

General information
- Type: Interceptor
- National origin: France
- Manufacturer: Amiot-SECM
- Designer: M. Detartre
- Number built: 2

History
- First flight: June 1928

The Amiot 110, also known as the Amiot-SECM 110, was a French prototype interceptor designed and built in 1928.

== Development ==
The Amiot 110 was designed as a contender in the so-called "Jockey" lightweight interceptor contest, competing against nine other types. It was a braced parasol wing monoplane with an all-metal structure and metal skinned fuselage. The first prototype had a fabric covered wing, replaced by metal skinning in the second. It had fixed, conventional landing gear; the stub wing behind the gear was part of a jettisonable fuel tank.

== Operational history ==
It first flew in June 1928 and looked a promising candidate to win the "Jockey" contest. However it crashed on 1 July 1929, killing the pilot due to several loose rivets and integrity flaws. No further production went ahead after a second prototype was deemed inferior to the Nieuport-Delage NiD 62.

== Specifications ==
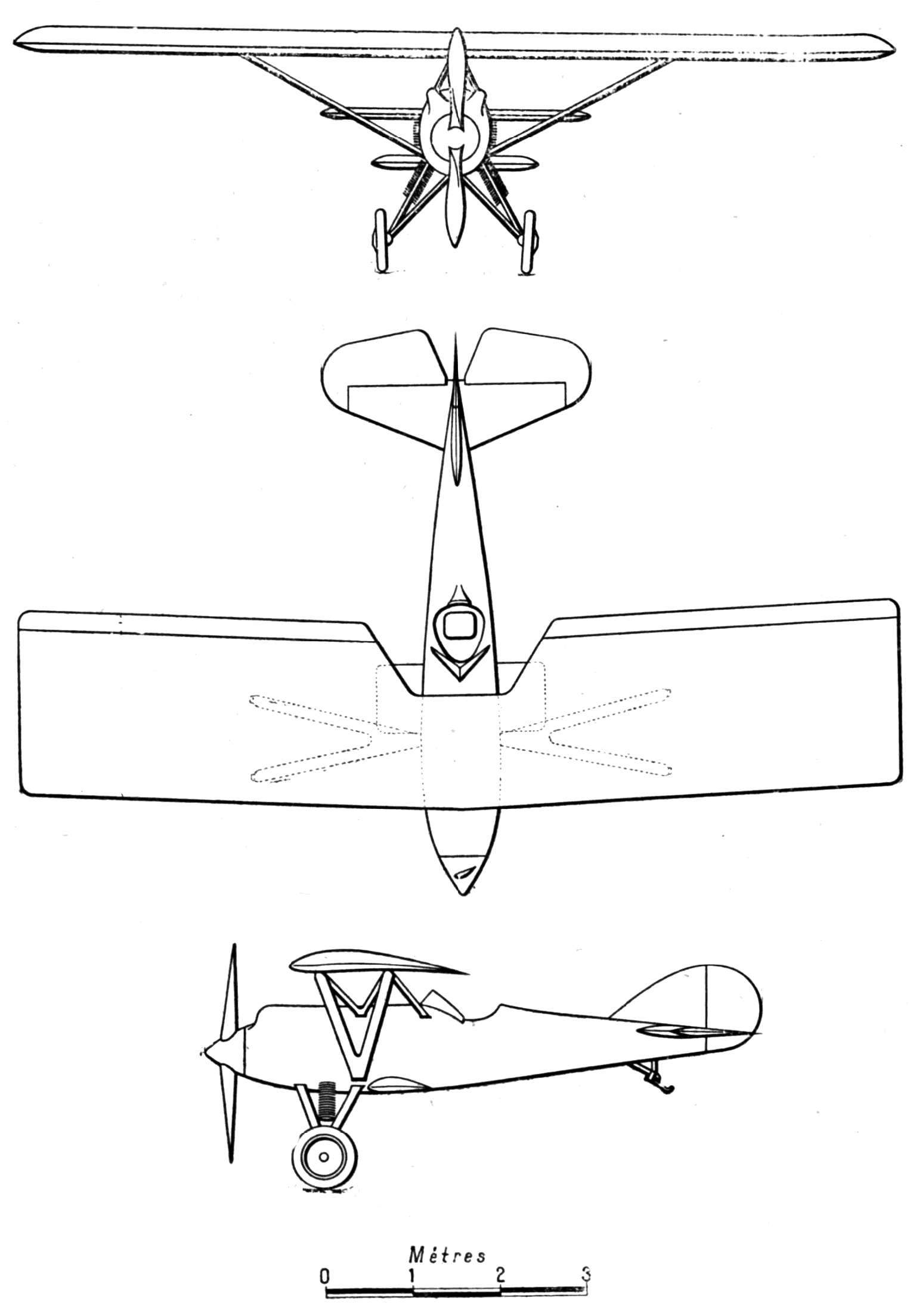
Amiot S.E.C.M. 110 C.1 3-view drawing from L'Aéronautique June,1928

Data from Les Ailes, May 1929 unless noted

General characteristics

- Crew: One
- Length: 6.50 m (21 ft 4 in)
- Wingspan: 10.50 m (34 ft 5 in)
- Height: 2.80 m (9 ft 2 in)
- Wing area: 21 m^{2} (230 sq ft)
- Empty weight: 1,120 kg (2,469 lb)
- Gross weight: 1,500 kg (3,307 lb)
- Powerplant: 1 × Hispano-Suiza 12Mb water-cooled V-12, 370 kW (500 hp)
- Propellers: 2-bladed

Performance

- Maximum speed: 290 km/h (180 mph, 160 kn) at ground level, 275 km/h (171 mph; 148 kn) at 4,000 m (13,000 ft)
- Stall speed: 95 km/h (59 mph, 51 kn) minimum speed
- Range: 500 km (310 mi, 270 nmi)
- Service ceiling: 8,000 m (26,000 ft)
- Time to altitude: 8 min to 4,000 m (13,000 ft)
- Wing loading: 71.4 kg/m^{2} (14.6 lb/sq ft)
- Landing speed: 80 km/h (50 mph; 43 kn)

Armament

- Guns: 2 × 0.303 in (7.70 mm) Vickers machine guns.
