= Nieuport-Delage NiD 52 =

1927 fighter aircraft family

NiD.52 & NiD.72
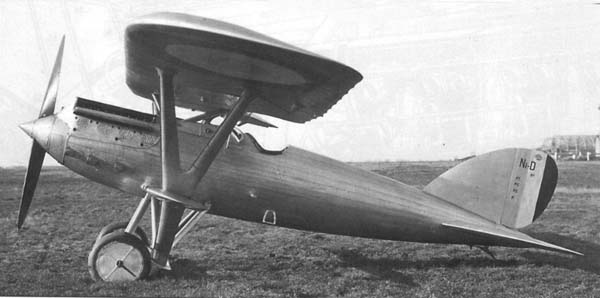
- A NiD 52 of the French Air Force

General information
- Type: Fighter
- National origin: France
- Manufacturer: Nieuport-Delage
- Primary user: Spain
- Number built: 135

History
- Introduction date: 1929
- First flight: 1927
- Developed from: Nieuport-Delage NiD 42

The Nieuport-Delage NiD 52 was a French fighter aircraft of the 1920s. A single-engined sesquiplane, it served with the Spanish Air Force, being operated by both sides of the Spanish Civil War.

== Development and design ==
In 1924 Nieuport produced a design for a single-seat sesquiplane fighter of mixed construction, the Nieuport-Delage NiD 42, which was ordered in small numbers for the French air force, entering service in 1927. Nieuport developed three refined versions in 1927, the all-metal NiD-52 and NiD-72 and the mixed construction Nieuport-Delage NiD 62. Like the NiD 42 on which it was based, the NiD 52 was powered by a Hispano-Suiza 12Hb V12 engine, but the wooden monocoque rear fuselage was replaced by an equivalent made of duralumin and the wooden wing ribs by light alloy, while retaining a fabric covering. Both the main and secondary wings were of reduced area compared to the NiD-42, and an enlarged tail fitted in an attempt to improve the aircraft's handling. Armament remained two 7.7 mm Vickers machine guns.

The prototype NiD 52 flew in late 1927, with the NiD 72, which was similar to the NiD 52 but had duralumin skinning on the wing and had a further reduced wing area, and the NiD 62 flying in January 1928. Although France preferred the cheaper NiD 62, purchasing it in large numbers, the NiD 52 won a competition for a new fighter for Spain in 1928, purchasing a licence for the construction of 125 aircraft to be built by Hispano-Suiza in their factory at Guadalajara. The similar NiD 72 was ordered in small numbers by Belgium and Brazil.

== Operational history ==
=== Spain ===
The Spanish Air Force started to take deliveries of NiD 52s in 1930, production continuing until 1933, equipping three fighter units, Grupo 11, Grupo 1 and Grupo 13. The "Hispano-Nieuport" (as it was known) was unpopular in Spanish service, being described as heavy and unresponsive, while it was slower than expected, with Spanish aircraft only able to reach 225 km/h (140 mph) compared with the 260 km/h (162 mph) claimed by Nieuport. Losses to accidents were heavy, with only 56 remaining when the Spanish Civil War broke out on 18 July 1936.

The majority of the surviving Hispano-Nieuport remained in government hands during the civil war, with only 11 falling into Nationalist hands, including three aircraft that mistakenly landed in Nationalist territory on 21 July. The Republican forces were strengthened by Hispano-Suiza building a further 10 aircraft from spares in August–September 1936.

Until more modern fighters could be obtained, the elderly Hispano-Nieuport was an important part of Republican fighter strength, with Republican and Nationalist NiD 52s facing each other in combat several times in the early months of the war, which resulted in at least one case of one Republican unit of NiD 52s attacking another, resulting in the loss of a Hispano-Nieuport. The Republican NiDs soon found themselves outclassed by more modern Fiat CR.32 and Heinkel He 51 fighters operated by the Italian Aviazione Legionaria and the German Condor Legion supporting the Nationalists, with it being claimed that three NiD 52s could just about hold their own against a single Fiat CR.32. Despite this, most losses were from accidents, not combat, particularly when being flown by foreign Volunteer pilots not used to the difficult handling.

The NiD 52 was withdrawn from the front line during the winter of 1936–37, being relegated to training and coastal patrol, although they were briefly pressed back into combat following the Battle of Guadalajara, being used to attack the retreating Italians. No NiD 52s survived the war.

=== Brazil ===
When the Constitutionalist Revolution began in Brazil on 9 July 1932, Brazil had two NiD 72s still serviceable, both of which served with the Legalista forces loyal to President Getúlio Vargas. On 21 August 1932, however, Captain Adherbal de Costa Oliveria defected to the Constitucionalist rebels. Both NiD 72s were heavily used until the end of the uprising.

== Variants ==
Nieuport-Delage NiD 52
Single-seat fighter aircraft.
Nieuport-Delage NiD 72 C.1
Improved version of the NiD 52. Three aircraft were delivered to Belgium in 1929, four modified aircraft were delivered to Brazil in 1931. One aircraft modified from a NiD-62 was powered by a Hispano-Suiza 12Lb V-12 engine.
Nieuport-Delage NiD 82
This prototype was powered at first by a 600 hp (447 kW) Hispano-Suiza 12Lb engine. Later it was fitted with a 500 hp (373 kW) Lorraine 12Ha Pétrel engine.

== Operators ==
Belgium
Aviation Militaire Belge (3 NiD.72, evaluation only)
Brazil
Aviação Militar (4 NiD.72)
Romania
Aeronautica Militara Romana (3 NiD.72, evaluation only)
Spain
Fuerzas Aéreas de la República Española (NiD.52)
Spain
Aviación Nacional (NiD.52)

== Specifications (NiD 52) ==
Data from The Complete Book of Fighters

General characteristics

- Crew: One
- Length: 7.64 m (25 ft 1 in)
- Upper wingspan: 12.00 m (39 ft 4 in)
- Height: 3.00 m (9 ft 10 in)
- Wing area: 27.8 m^{2} (299 sq ft)
- Empty weight: 1,360 kg (2,998 lb)
- Gross weight: 1,800 kg (3,968 lb)
- Powerplant: 1 × Hispano-Suiza 12Hb liquid-cooled V-12 engine, 373 kW (500 hp)

Performance

- Maximum speed: 260 km/h (160 mph, 140 kn) at 1,800 m (5,900 ft)
- Range: 400 km (250 mi, 220 nmi)
- Service ceiling: 8,200 m (26,900 ft)
- Time to altitude: 13 minutes 30 seconds to 5,000 m (16,000 ft)

Armament

- Guns: 2 × 7.7 mm (0.303 in) machine guns

== See also ==
Related lists

- List of interwar military aircraft
- List of aircraft of the Spanish Republican Air Force
