= Blériot-SPAD S.91 =

S.91
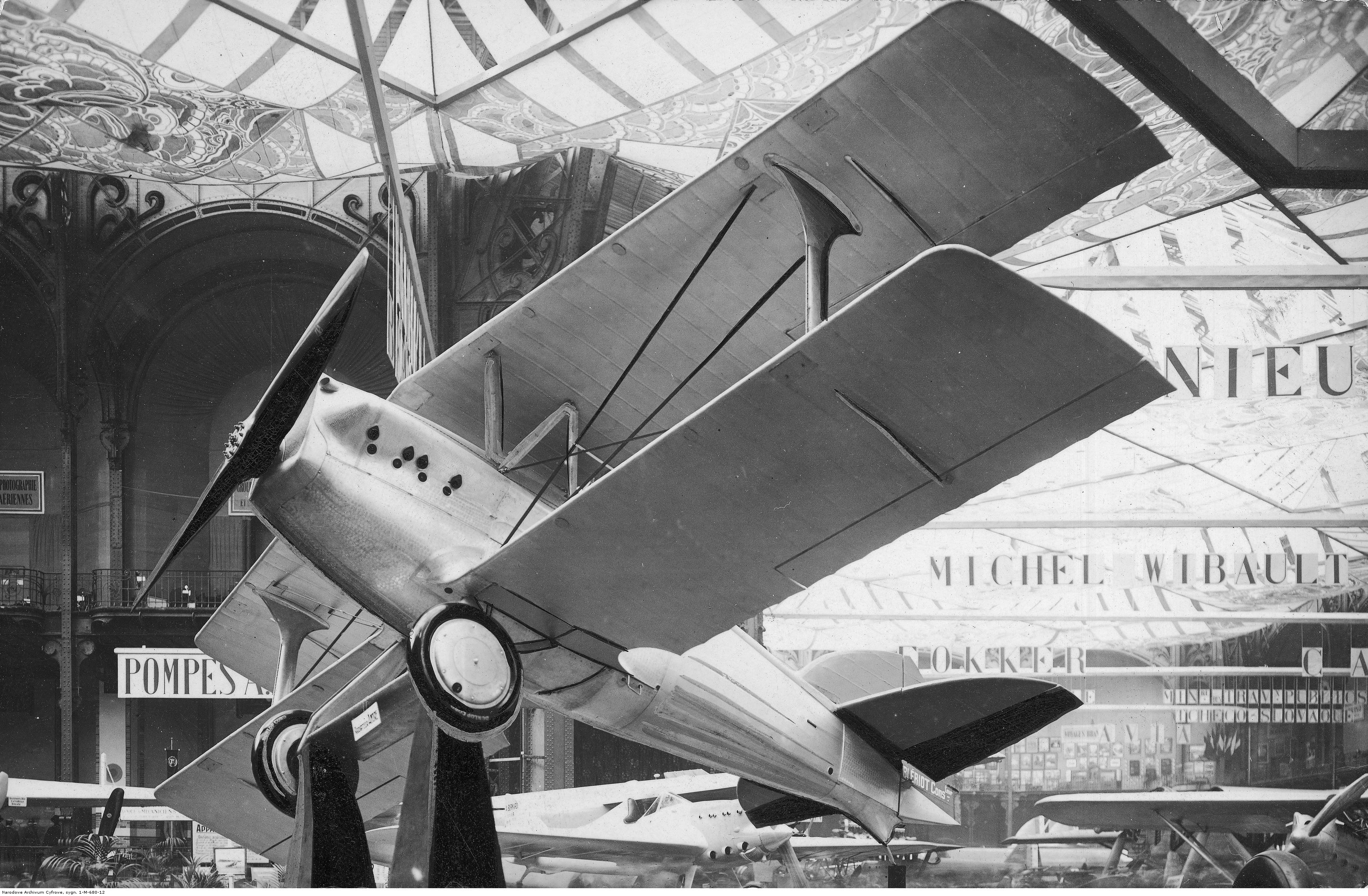
- A SPAD S.91/2 on display at the Paris Aero Salon

General information
- Type: Fighter
- Manufacturer: Blériot
- Designer: André Herbemont
- Primary user: Spanish Republican Air Force
- Number built: 3

History
- First flight: 23 August 1927
- Developed into: Blériot-SPAD S.510

The Blériot-SPAD S.91 was a light-weight fighter aircraft by the French aircraft manufacturer Blériot.

It was developed in response to a French government program for a light fighter aircraft. The S.91 was a single-seat earlier single-bay biplane that resembled pursuit aircraft produced by André Herbermont except for its wing profile. Duralumin and other light metals comprised a substantial amount of the framework; a single girder composed of out of duralumin tube supported the entirety of the fuselage aft of the cockpit. The majority of the covering was fabric. According to Blériot, it was a highly maneuverable aircraft and was also relatively easy to operate.

On 23 August 1927, the first prototype performed its maiden flight; it was lost in an accident during flight testing. The completion of a second prototype permitted the resumption of flight testing. Despite the French government having lost interest in the general concept, the company opted to continue work for a time, promoting the S.91 to various prospective foreign operators. During 1936, at least one of the surviving S.91 prototypes ended up in the Spanish Republican Air Force. While the S.91 would never go into quantity production, it would eventually be developed into the Blériot-SPAD S.510, which would be the last biplane produced by the French aeronautic industries.

== Design and development ==
The S.91 was a single-seat single-bay biplane developed towards the end of the 1920s by Blériot in order to meet the requirements of a French government program that sought a light fighter aircraft, which was referred to as "Jockey". The French aircraft manufacturer Blériot was one of several domestic companies to develop a response to this requirement, opting to design a clean-sheet pursuit aircraft that was intended to be both relatively quick and manoeuvrable for the era.

In terms of its general configuration, the S.91 bore a close resemblance to the earlier pursuit aircraft produced by André Herbermont (a lead aircraft designer at Blériot), the most prominent exception being the wing profile adopted. Both the upper and lower wings had the same chord; the lower wings were rectangular and staggered aft while the upper wings possessed a clear sweep back. The upper wings were attached to the fuselage via a metal cabane that consisted of two sets of reversed N-shaped struts; the lower wings were attached to stubs which constituted integral elements of the fuselage.

The wings of each half-cell were joined by a single strut and were braced using streamlined wires composed of high-resistance steel. Each of the lower wings were furnished with a relatively large aileron that was unbalanced. The framework of the wing was entirely composed of duralumin, although the covering was made of fabric. Each wing had a pair of spars that were made up of open-work rectangular tubing that were free of both rivets and joints. In the vicinity of the cockpit, the lower wings featured a sight cut away in order to improve the pilot’s downward visibility, which was claimed to be quite good. The pilot could operate a pair of machine guns, which remained entirely accessible throughout the flight.

The framework of the fuselage was composed of light metals. The forward section, which included all fuselage elements forward of the pilot’s cockpit, incorporated the aircraft’s power plant and consisted of open-work box girders. Aft of the cockpit, the fuselage formed a single girder that was constructed out of duralumin tubes. All of the longerons, uprights, cross beams and diagonals were assembled using riveted gussets. The horizontal empennage consisted of an adjustable stabilizer, the forward edge of which rested on the longerons of the upper fuselage; the rear edge of the empennage carried the adjusting apparatus. A two-part elevator formed a continuation of the stabilizer. The vertical empennage consisted of a conventional fin and rudder. All of the tail planes were composed of duralumin and were covered with fabric.

The S.91 was typically powered by a single Hispano-Suiza 12Hb V-12 engine, capable of generating up to 500hp. Cooling was achieved using a Lamblin water-based radiators that was mounted on struts and positioned forward of the landing gear. The Lamblin-supplied oil radiator was located underneath the fuselage. The aircraft was typically equipped with a removable fuel tank, which was positioned inside of the fuselage.

The landing gear was formed of two V-shaped struts that consisted of box members in front and tubes aft. It incorporated a hinged axle; each half-axle, which was relatively elevated in respect to the axis of the disk wheel, was likewise a box spar with a streamlined housing. The shock absorbers were located on the inside of the wheels. The tail skid, which consisted of a spring with steel leaves, was hinged to the is sternpost of the fuselage and was attached at its upper end to a removable shock absorber. The skid could be replaced relatively easily by removing the pin that connected it with the stern post.

== Prototypes and into flight ==
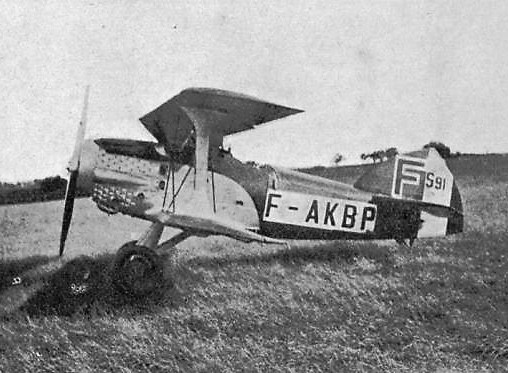

On 23 August 1927, the first prototype performed its maiden flight. During the flight testing of this initial aircraft, the company announced that it had attained a maximum speed of 270 km (168 miles) per hour while at an altitude of 4Q00 m (13,123 ft.). Furthermore, the prototype was claimed to be both highly manoeuvrable and relatively easy to operate as a result of its compact dimensions, favourable centring and the selected wing profile. This prototype was destroyed in a crash; flight testing resumed following the completion of a second prototype. Even after the French government dropped interest in the program seeking a light fighter for the French Air Force, André Herbemont designed a further prototype with an inverted sesquiplane wing configuration.

While flight demonstrations were performed in both Romania and Greece in the hope of garnering sales, no orders for the type followed. André Herbemont would use his experience with the S.91 prototypes in order to develop the S.510, another biplane fighter which would go into production and would be later used by the French Air Force.

In 1936, at least one of the surviving S.91 prototypes ended up in the Spanish Republican Air Force.

== Variants ==
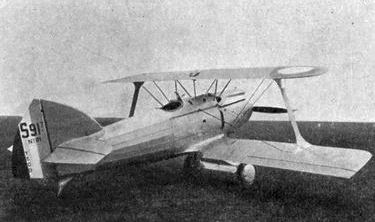
Blériot-SPAD S.91/7 photo from L'Aerophile Salon 1932

S.91 Leger
Powered by a 370 kW (500 hp) Hispano-Suiza 12Hb V-12 water-cooled engine with twin-leg radiators mounted on the undercarriage, (1 built).

S.91/1
The S.91 Leger fitted with a frontal radiator design.

S.91/2
The S.91/1 prototype fitted with a 370 kW (500 hp) Hispano-Suiza 12Gb W-12 water-cooled engine. It was displayed in Romania and Greece.

S.91/3
The S.91/2 was fitted with a 310 kW (420 hp) Gnome-Rhône 9A Jupiter nine-cylinder air-cooled radial engine, (1 built).

S.91/4
The S.91 Leger, fitted with a 370 kW (500 hp) Hispano-Suiza 12Mb V-12 engine, flew again on 4 July 1930 with some modifications, including radiators mounted on top of the upper wing.

S.91/5
The sole S.91/3, fitted with a 360 kW (480 hp) Gnome-Rhône 9Ae Jupiter, which crashed on the day of its first flight killing the pilot.

S.91/6
This S.91/4 conversion flew in November 1930 and differed from the prototype in having rounded wingtips, a lengthened fuselage and a tailplane lowered to the fuselage base. Later the tailplane was restored to its former position.

S.91/7
A new prototype with inverted sesquiplane wing configuration in which only the lower wing had ailerons. It flew on 23 December 1931 and was fitted with a 370 kW (500 hp) Hispano-Suiza 12Mc V-12 engine. On 2 June 1932 this plane established a record of 308.78 km/h (191.87 mph; 166.73 kn) in a 500 km (310 mi) closed-circuit.

S.91/8
The S.91/7 prototype fitted with a supercharged Hispano-Suiza 12Xbrs engine and a variable-pitch Ratier propeller made its maiden flight on 20 August 1932. This version is reported to have achieved a speed of 360 km/h (220 mph; 190 kn).

S.91/9
The S.91/8 became a testbed for Hispano-Suiza's engine-mounted 20 mm (0.787 in) cannon, after being leased to the company in December 1932. Besides the cannon it was also fitted with a large-diameter Levasseur fixed-pitch propeller.

== Operators ==
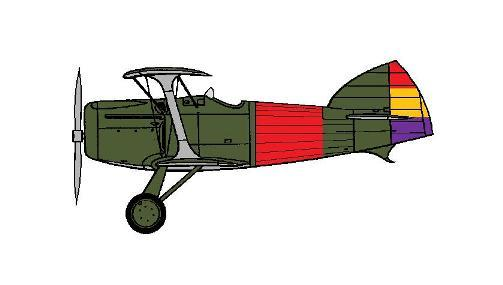
Bleriot-SPAD S-91 of the Spanish Republican Air Force

Spain

- Spanish Republican Air Force

== Specifications (S.91 Leger) ==
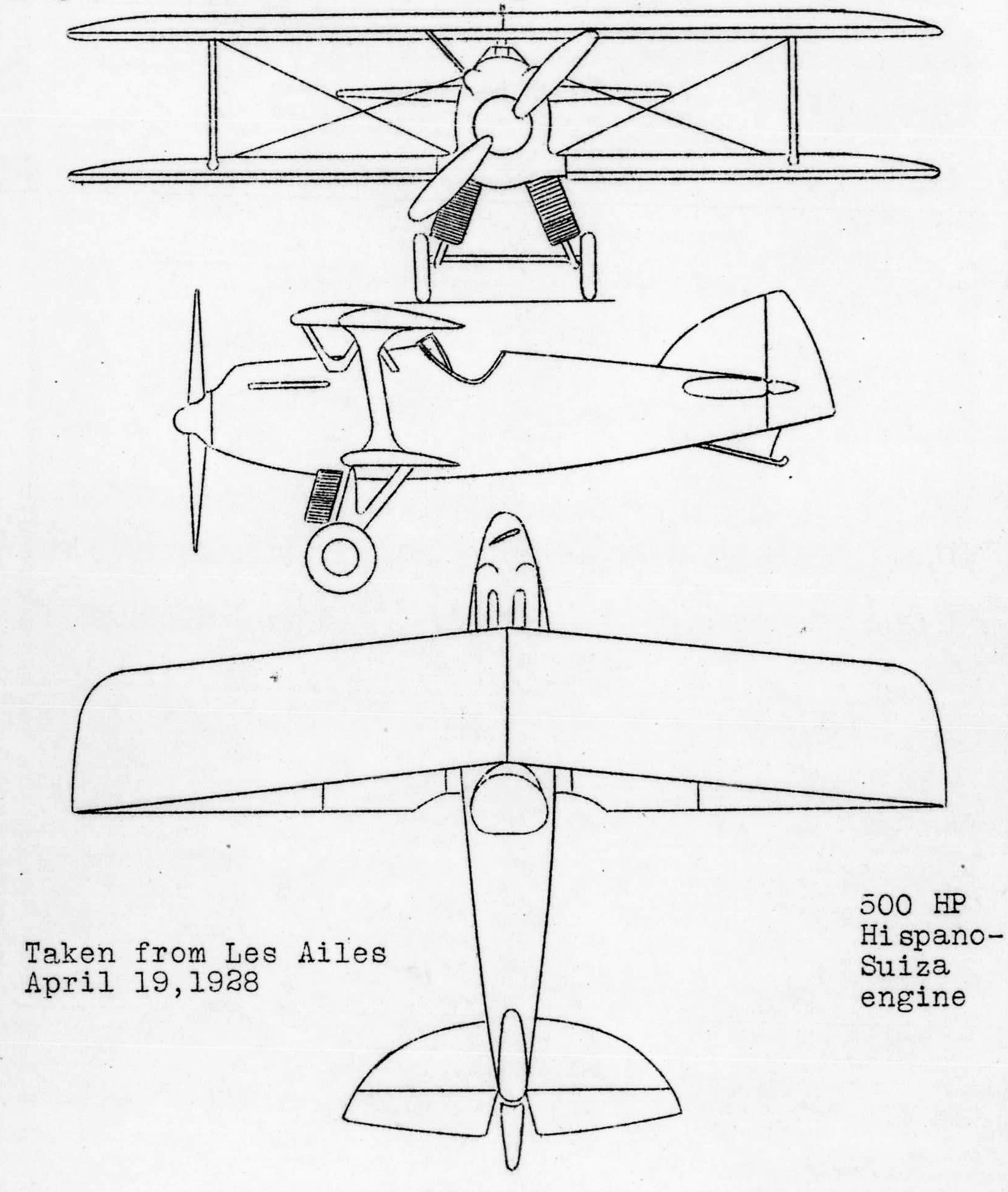
Bleriot SPAD S.91 3-view drawing from NACA Aircraft Circular No.74

Data from Jane's all the World's Aircraft 1928, Aviafrance:S.91 Leger

General characteristics

- Crew: one
- Length: 6.52 m (21 ft 5 in)
- Wingspan: 8.65 m (28 ft 5 in)
- Height: 2.94 m (9 ft 8 in)
- Wing area: 22 m^{2} (240 sq ft)
- Empty weight: 1,120 kg (2,469 lb)
- Gross weight: 1,450 kg (3,197 lb)
- Powerplant: 1 × Hispano-Suiza 12Hb V-12 water-cooled piston engine, 370 kW (500 hp)
- Propellers: 2-bladed fixed pitch propeller

Performance

- Maximum speed: 270 km/h (170 mph, 150 kn) at 4,000 m (13,000 ft)
- Range: 400 km (250 mi, 220 nmi)
- Service ceiling: 8,000 m (26,000 ft)

Armament

- Guns: 2x 7.7 mm (0.303 in) Vickers machine-guns in the forward fuselage

== See also ==
Related development

- Blériot-SPAD S.510

Related lists

- List of Interwar military aircraft
- List of aircraft of the Spanish Republican Air Force
