= Blériot-SPAD S.510 =

French biplane fighter aircraft

S.510
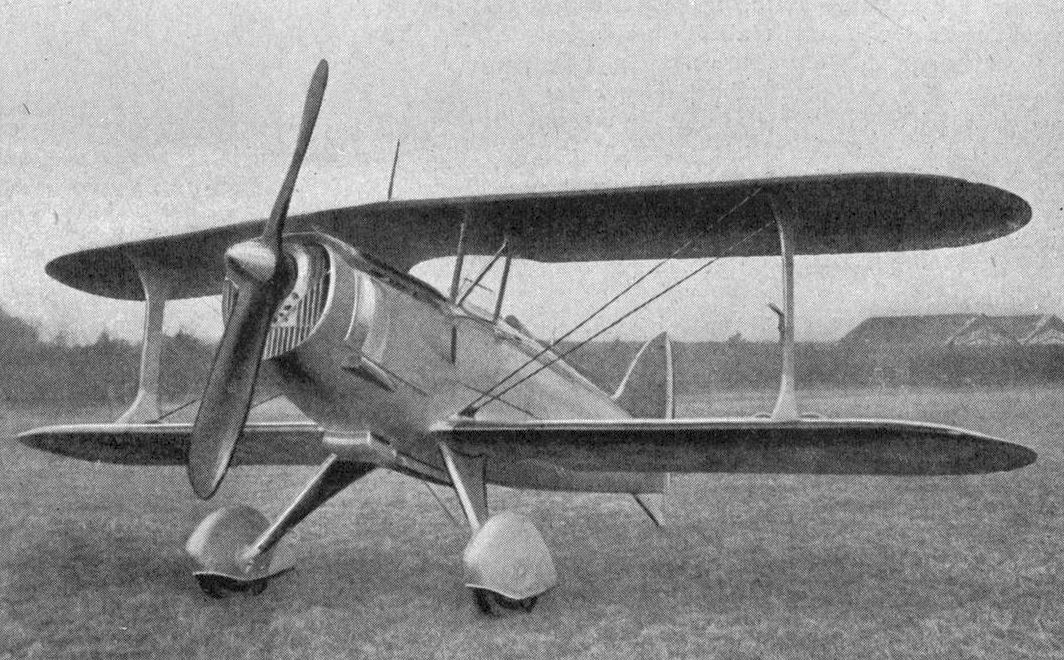

General information
- Type: Fighter
- Manufacturer: Blériot-SPAD
- Designer: André Herbemont
- Primary user: French Air Force
- Number built: 61

History
- Introduction date: 1936
- First flight: 6 January 1933
- Developed from: Blériot-SPAD S.91

The Blériot SPAD S.510 was a French single-seat, single-engined biplane fighter aircraft. First flying in 1933, 60 were built for the Armée de l'Air (French Air Force), entering service in 1936. The type remained in service as a fighter-trainer at the start of the Second World War. It was the last French biplane fighter to enter production.

== Development ==
The Blériot-SPAD S.510 was designed by André Herbemont to meet a 1930 French requirement for a single seat fighter. The new fighter was required to have a speed of 325 km/h (202 mph; 175 kn) at an altitude of 3,500 m (11,500 ft) (later increased to 350 km/h (220 mph; 190 kn) at the same height), with an armament of either four machine guns, one 20 mm cannon and two machine guns, or two cannon. Herbemont's design was based on his earlier S.91, and of the 11 designs submitted to meet the requirement, (Note: In addition to the SPAD 510, the other competitors were the Bernard 260, the Dewoitine D.500, the Loire 43, the ANF Les Mureaux 170, the Morane-Saulnier M.S.325, the Nieuport-Delage NiD-122, the Hanriot H.110, the Gourdou-Leseurre GL-482, the Wibault 313 and the Dewoitine D.560.) was the only biplane.

The SPAD 510 was of all-metal construction, with fabric-covered wings and tail, and a monocoque rear fuselage. The aircraft had a fixed conventional landing gear, which had a reputation for being fragile in service, with faired mainwheels and a tailskid. The aircraft was powered by a Hispano-Suiza 12Xbrs liquid-cooled V12 engine rated at 690 hp (510 kW) driving a two-bladed wooden propeller. Armament consisted of four 7.5 mm MAC 1934 machine guns mounted under the lower wing (the prototype carried the same armament, but with two guns in the fuselage). The last two production SPAD 510s were fitted with a Hispano-Suiza 12Xcrs engine, allowing a Hispano-Suiza 20 mm cannon to be mounted between the engine's cylinder banks, and firing through the propeller.

The sole prototype first flew on 6 January 1933. Flight testing revealed handling problems which resulted in the aircraft's centre fuselage being lengthened by 40 cm (16 in) and its vertical tail surfaces being enlarged. During evaluation in 1935 against the already in production Dewoitine D.500 at the Centre d'expériences aériennes militaires (CEAM), the French military aviation research centre at Reims, the SPAD 510 demonstrated superior manoeuvrability and climb rate. As a result, an order for 60 aircraft was placed on 30 August 1935.

Performance was similar to the British Gloster Gladiator. The S.510's armament generally consisted of 4 machine guns (installed as either a combination of 2 fuselage-mounted guns, plus 2 in under-wing gondolas or with all 4 in under-wing gondolas). This gave it a much heavier attack capability than most earlier biplane fighters and equalled that of the final biplanes used by the British and Italians, the Gladiator and Fiat CR.42 Falco. The S.510 was doomed to obsolescence before it even flew, although when it was designed many pilots and experts strongly believed that biplanes would prove better fighters than monoplanes because of their tighter turning circles. Despite its strengths, the S.510 only enjoyed about a year of usefulness. An adequate fighter for 1936, it was quickly outclassed by the new more modern monoplanes developed by Germany, Britain, and France. It had fixed landing gear as well as a weak fuel system and undercarriage.

In response to a 1934 French competition for a more modern single-seat fighter, Herbemont designed the Blériot-SPAD S.710, based on the 510. The SPAD 710, while still a biplane, had a retractable undercarriage and an enclosed cockpit and was fitted with a V-tail. It was powered by a 860 hp (640 kW) Hispano-Suiza 12Ycrs engine, which was estimated to give a speed of 470 km/h (290 mph; 250 kn). A prototype flew for the first time in April 1937, but crashed on 15 June that year due to tail flutter, killing the pilot. This caused further development to be abandoned.

== Operational history ==
Blériot-SPAD S.510

Deliveries of the SPAD 510 to the Armée de l'Air (i.e. the French Air Force) began in early 1936, with the new fighters replacing the Morane-Saulnier M.S.225s of Groupe de Chasse 1/7 (GC 1/7) from May 1937, and the Nieuport-Delage NiD 62s and NiD 629s of Groupe de Chasse II/7 (GC II/7) from July 1937. In 1937, SPAD 510s were used to equip the Weiser circus aerobatic team, named after the commander of 7^{e} Escadre (7th Wing, the parent unit of the two Groupes), which displayed around France that year. In 1938, with increasing tensions between France and Germany, the two Groupe's SPADs were fitted with radios, allowing them to be declared as fit for combat, with some aircraft being fitted with revised exhausts to aid night flying. From January 1939, GC I/7 began to re-equip with modern Morane-Saulnier M.S.406 fighter monoplanes, with the last SPAD 510 discarded in February, while GC II/7 replaced its SPAD 510s by M.S.406s later that year, completing its re-equipment just before its mobilisation at the start of the Second World War.

In August 1939, obsolete fighters held in storage in France after being replaced in the front line units were used to equip Escadrilles Régionales de Chasse (ERC - regional fighter flights) to train reservists, with two flights formed in mainland France with a mixture of SPAD 510s and older NiD-622s, ERC 3/561 at Saint-Inglevert Airfield and ERC 4/561 at Villacoublay. In October, the two ERCs joined together to form Groupe Aėrien Régional de Chasse II/561 (GARC II/561) based at Havre-Oteville. On 18 January 1940 GARC II/561 was redesignated as GC III/10, which received Bloch MB.151s over the next few weeks to allow the unit to transition to a front-line fighter role. The displaced S.510s returned to their training role where they served until the Armistice of 22 June 1940. Approximately ten S.510s were sent to French North Africa in 1939 to join ERCs at Oran and Rabat. In May 1940, the ERCs based in French North Africa were combined to form a new fighter group, GC III/5, with equipment including SPAD 510s, but these were replaced by Morane-Saulnier M.S.406s by the end of May.

Reports that it may have served in the Spanish Republican Air Force during the Spanish Civil War are doubtful. There is no evidence that S.510 were ever actually sent and they may have been confused with the Blériot-SPAD S.91 or with the Dewoitine D.510 that were delivered to the Escuadrilla Internacional.

== Variants ==
S.510.01
First prototype aircraft.
S.510
Production aircraft powered by 510 kW (690 hp) Hispano-Suiza 12Xbrs engines, armed with 4 x 7.5 mm (0.30 in) MAC 1934 machine guns, (60 built).
S.710
One prototype only with a butterfly tail, powered by a single 640 kW (860 hp) Hispano-Suiza 12Ycrs V-12 engine, armed with a 20 mm (0.79 in) HS.404 cannon firing through the propeller hub in addition to the MAC 1934 machine guns in the wings.

== Operators ==
France

- Armée de l'Air

== Specifications (S.510) ==
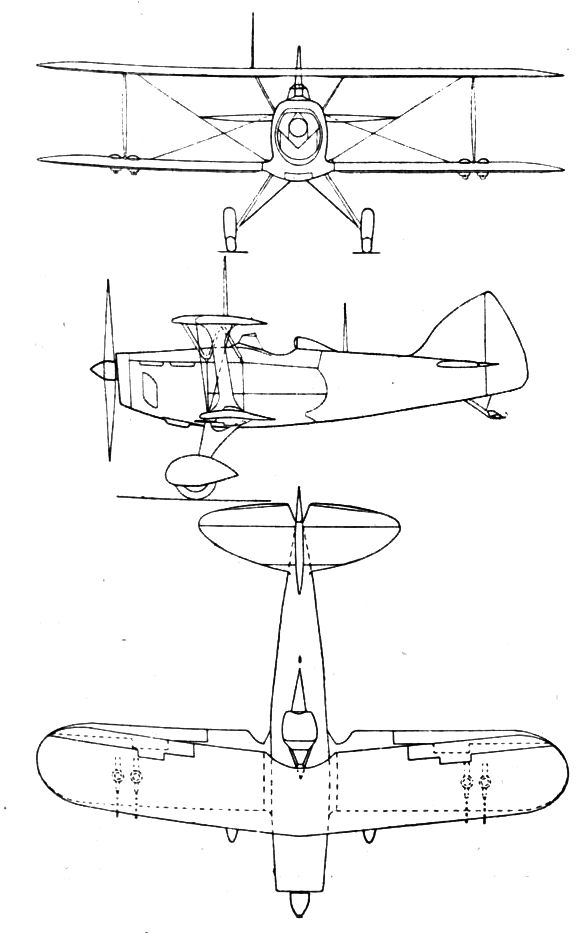
SPAD 510 3-view drawing from L'Aerophile January 1938

Data from The Complete Book of Fighters

General characteristics

- Crew: 1
- Length: 7.46 m (24 ft 6 in)
- Wingspan: 8.84 m (29 ft 0 in)
- Height: 3.72 m (12 ft 2 in)
- Wing area: 22.0 m^{2} (237 sq ft)
- Empty weight: 1,250 kg (2,756 lb)
- Gross weight: 1,650 kg (3,638 lb)
- Max takeoff weight: 1,830 kg (4,034 lb)
- Powerplant: 1 × Hispano-Suiza 12Xbrs V-12 liquid-cooled piston engine, 510 kW (690 hp)

Performance

- Maximum speed: 370 km/h (230 mph, 200 kn) at 5,000 m (16,400 ft)
- Range: 875 km (544 mi, 472 nmi)
- Service ceiling: 10,100 m (33,100 ft)
- Time to altitude: 3 min 22 sec

Armament

- Guns: 4 × 7.5 mm MAC 1934 machine guns

== See also ==
Aircraft of comparable role, configuration, and era

- Arado Ar 68
- Avia B-534
- Dewoitine D.500
- Fiat CR.32
- Gloster Gladiator
- Hawker Fury
- Heinkel He 51
- Polikarpov I-15

Related lists

- List of aircraft of the French Air Force during World War II
- List of fighter aircraft
- List of interwar military aircraft
- List of military aircraft of France
