= Aviméta 88 =

General information
- Type: Two seat reconnaissance fighter
- National origin: France
- Manufacturer: Aviméta (Société pour la Construction d'Avions Métallique)
- Designer: George Lapère
- Number built: 1

History
- First flight: c.1927

The Aviméta 88 was an all-metal French two-seat reconnaissance-fighter or heavy fighter tested in 1927.

== Design and development ==
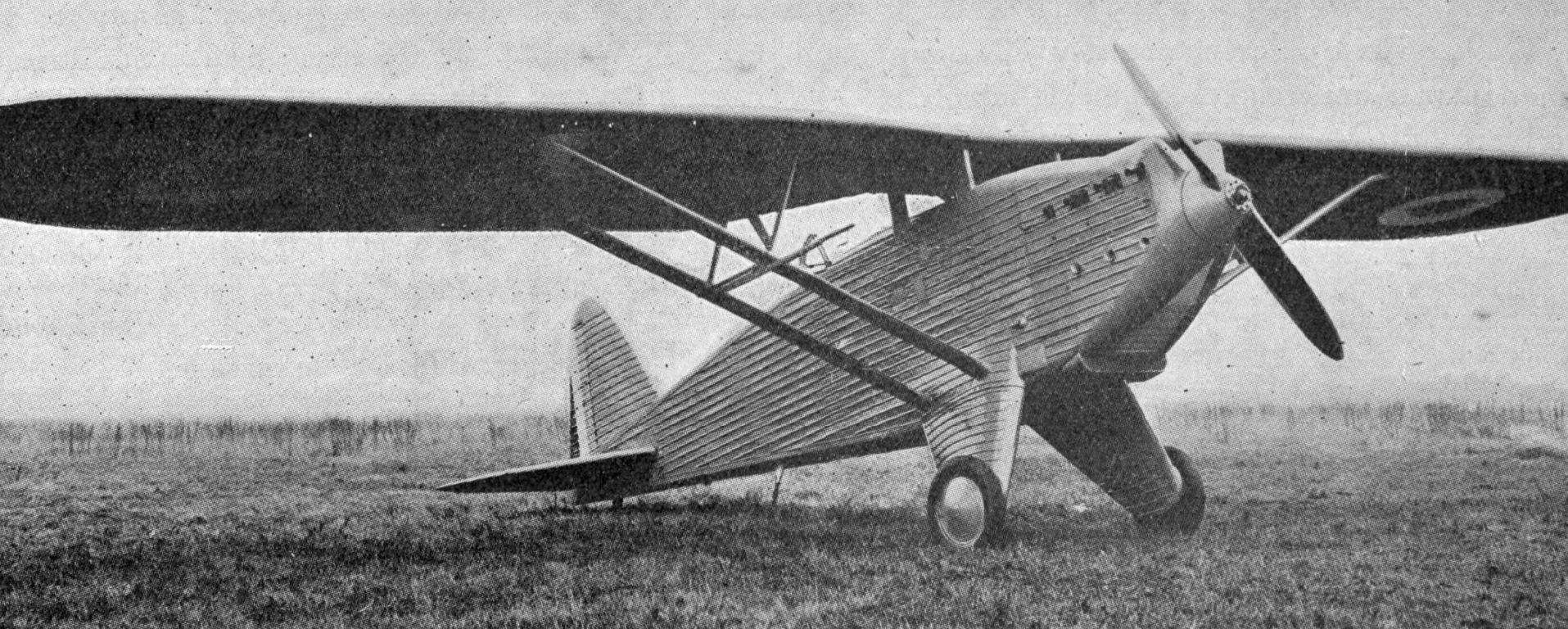
Aviméta 88 photo from L'Aéronautique August,1927

Aviméta, (Société pour la Construction d'Avions Métallique)‚ grew out of the Aeronautical Department of the Schneider-Creusot arms manufacturer. Both the frame and the corrugated covering of the Aviméta 88 were made from Alferium, an aluminium-iron alloy developed by Schneiders.

It was a parasol aircraft, with wings of constant chord and with slightly pointed, semi-elliptical tips. The thin-airfoil-section wings were built around two lattice girder spars and had a skin thickness of 300 μm. There was a large, trapezoidal cut-out in the trailing edge to improve the view from the cockpits. Its aileron hinges were set at a shallow angle to the trailing edge.

The wings were braced to the fuselage with a parallel pair of struts from the lower longerons to the spars at about mid-span assisted by N-form, cross-braced jury struts at right angles. Four very short struts from the upper fuselage longerons to the wing centre section formed a low cabane.

The square-section, rounded-cornered fuselage was built around these four longerons and a set of diagonally braced formers. The Aviméta's 444 kW (595 hp) Hispano-Suiza 12Hb water-cooled V-12 engine was in a pointed nose, driving a two-blade propeller. There were two open cockpits, with the pilot forward at mid-chord and the gunner/observer behind in line with the trailing edge. Behind the cockpits the fuselage tapered rapidly in profile to a conventional empennage, with the tailplane mounted at mid-fuselage. Both horizontal and vertical surfaces were strongly tapered, particularly on the leading edges, with a broad tailplane and fin but with small, inset elevators and rudder. The Aviméta 88 had independent bungee-sprung wheels on legs enclosed in tapered trouser fairings attached to the lower longerons at the bottom of the wing struts.

The Aviméta 88 was on show at the December 1926 Paris Aero Salon. It may not have flown by that date, and rather little is known about its later history, though it gave a "pretty impressive" display at Villacoublay in September 1927. Development was terminated when the official call for a two-seat fighter-reconnaissance aircraft was rescinded.

== Specifications ==
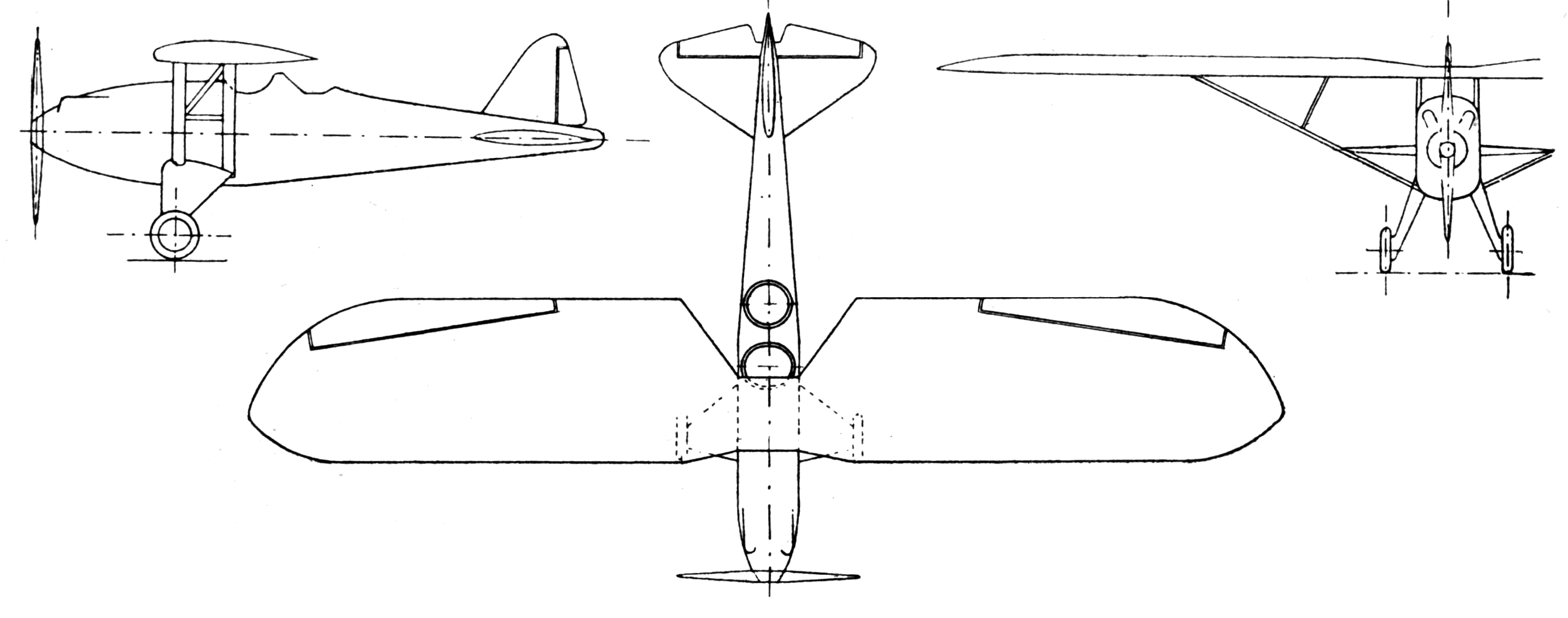
Aviméta 88 3-view drawing from L'Aéronautique December,1926

Data from Flight (2 December 1926)

General characteristics

- Crew: two
- Length: 9.76 m (32 ft 0 in)
- Wingspan: 17.00 m (55 ft 9 in)
- Height: 3.55 m (11 ft 8 in)
- Wing area: 40 m^{2} (430 sq ft)
- Empty weight: 1,550 kg (3,417 lb)
- Gross weight: 2,400 kg (5,291 lb)
- Fuel capacity: 310 kg (680 lb) (420 L (92 imp gal; 110 US gal)) in crash proof and in-flight jettisonable tank
- Powerplant: 1 × Hispano-Suiza 12Hb water-cooled V-12, 444 kW (595 hp)
- Propellers: 2-bladed

Performance

- Maximum speed: 240 km/h (150 mph, 130 kn) at sea level, 220 km/h (140 mph) at 5,000 m (16,000 ft)
- Service ceiling: 7,500 m (24,600 ft)
- Time to altitude: 16 min to 5,000 m (16,000 ft)

Armament

- two fixed, synchronised 7.7 mm (0.303 in) Vickers machine guns firing through propeller disc and two more mounted on the wing.
- pair of Lewis guns on flexible mounting in rear cockpit.
