= Nieuport-Delage NiD 43 =

NiD 43
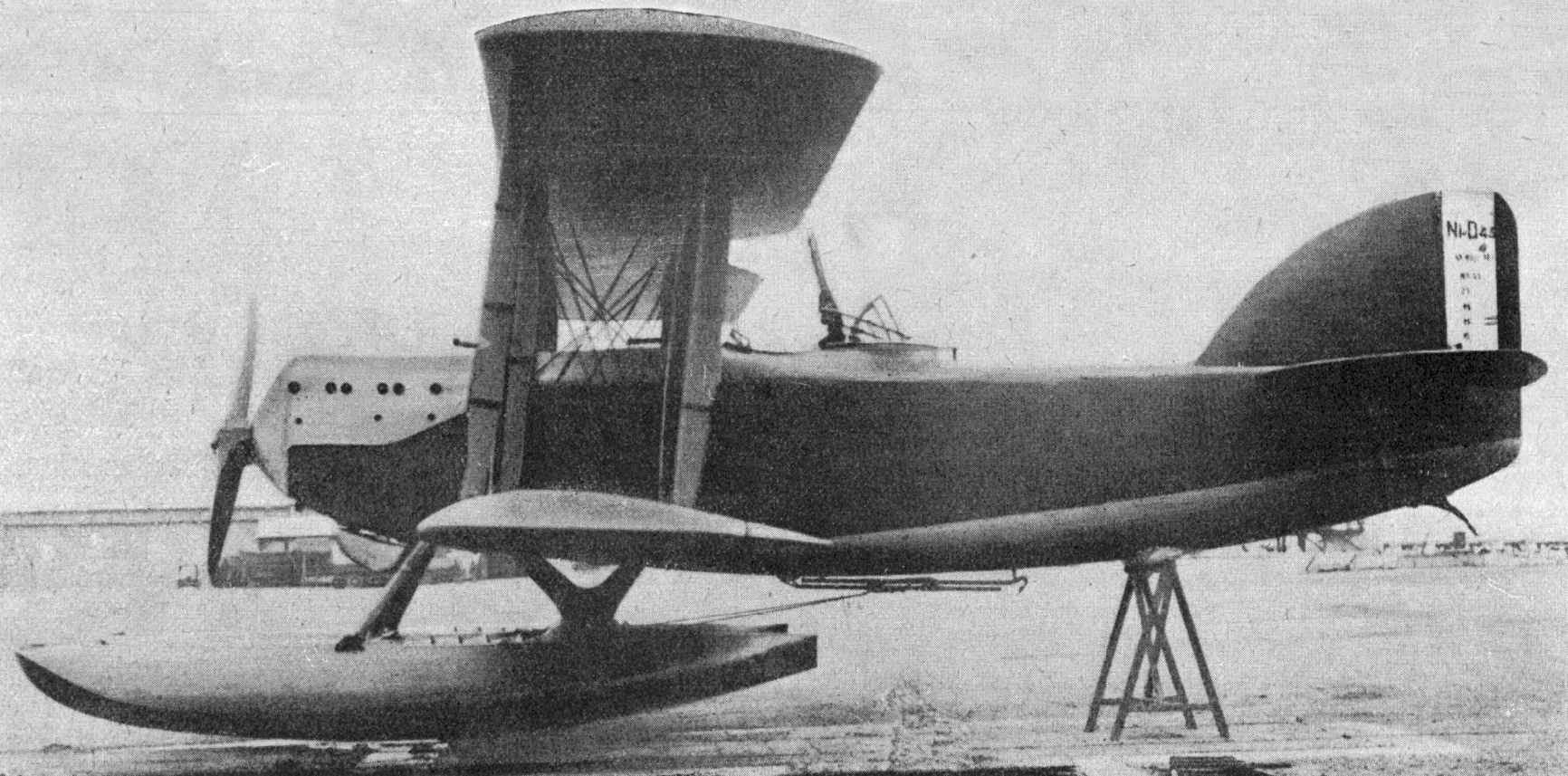

General information
- Type: Two seat shipborn fighter aircraft
- National origin: France
- Manufacturer: Nieuport-Delage
- Designer: Robert Duhamel, Albert Mary and Bonnemaison
- Number built: 1

History
- First flight: 1924

The Nieuport-Delage NiD 43 was a single-engine, two-seat biplane fighter aircraft designed and built for shipboard use in France in 1924.

== Design and development ==
The NiD 43 was designed to meet a naval requirement for a two-seat shipborne fighter. It was a two bay biplane, with unswept, constant chord, unstaggered wings braced by parallel pairs of interplane struts. There were ailerons on the lower wings alone. Its fuselage was flat sided, with two open cockpits. The pilot sat in the forward one under the wing trailing edge, where there was a cut-out to enhance his upward view, and the gunner was positioned close behind with a pair of Lewis machine guns mounted on a prominent ring. The tail was conventional, with a tailplane mounted on top of the fuselage and braced with two parallel struts on each side, a broad fin with a curved leading edge and a deep, straight edged rudder.

The NiD 43 was powered by a 373 kW (500 hp) Hispano-Suiza 12Hb water cooled upright V-12 engine in the nose, which drove a four blade propeller. The undercarriage was unusual; although it was expected that the aircraft would fly from an aircraft carrier, the probability of emergency water landings was recognised. Consequently, the NiD 43 was fitted with both wheels and floats. The latter were short and stepless, each attached to the aircraft by two short pairs of N-form struts. They reached well ahead of the wing leading edge but ended just aft of the trailing edge, too short to support the rear fuselage which instead was made watertight and floated the machine in a tail down traditional landing position. This allowed surface taxiing with the propeller clear of the water. There were fixed wheels recessed into the floats below the wing mid-chord, which on ship formed a conventional undercarriage, tail down again, with the short floats clearing the deck.

The NiD 43 began flight testing in 1924 and went the following year to Saint-Raphaël, Var for competitive evaluation by the Aéronavale. At the end of the assessment the Levasseur PL.5 was preferred and ordered, when development of the Nieuport ceased.

== Specifications ==
Data from Green and Swanborough

General characteristics

- Crew: Two
- Length: 10.00 m (32 ft 10 in)
- Wingspan: 12.80 m (42 ft 0 in)
- Height: 3.85 m (12 ft 8 in)
- Wing area: 44.30 m^{2} (476.8 sq ft)
- Empty weight: 1,680 kg (3,704 lb)
- Gross weight: 2,320 kg (5,115 lb)
- Powerplant: 1 × Hispano-Suiza 12Hb water cooled upright V-12, 370 kW (500 hp)
- Propellers: 4-bladed fixed pitch

Performance

- Maximum speed: 200 km/h (120 mph, 110 kn) at sea level
- Endurance: 2.5 h
- Time to altitude: 40 min to 6,000 m (19,685 ft)

Armament

- 2 × 7.7 mm (0.303 in) synchronised Vickers machine guns firing through propeller and 2 × 7.7 mm (0.303 in) Lewis machine guns on ring mount in rear cockpit.
