= Dewoitine D.560 =

General information
- Type: Single-seat fighter prototype
- National origin: France
- Manufacturer: Dewoitine
- Number built: 1

History
- First flight: 1932

The Dewoitine D.560 was a prototype French single-seat fighter developed by Dewoitine as an alternate to the Dewoitine D.500. The design failed to better the performance and only one aircraft was built.

== Development ==
To provide an alternate design in the competition to supply the French Air Force with a successor to the Nieuport 62. Rather than the low-wing monoplane design of the D.500 the D.560 had a shoulder-mounted gull wing. During test flying the D.560 was found to be slower than the D.500 and had stability problems. The aircraft was rebuilt with a parasol wing and redesignated the D.570. Performance was even worse than the gull wing design, and following a crash of the prototype development was abandoned.

== Variants ==
D.560 Prototype gull wing fighter, one built. D.570 The D.560 rebuilt with a parasol wing.

== Specifications (D.560) ==
Data from

General characteristics

- Crew: one
- Length: 8.48 m (27 ft 10 in)
- Wingspan: 12.73 m (40 ft 7 in)
- Height: 3.43 m (11 ft 3 in)
- Wing area: 17.30 m^{2} (186.22 sq ft)
- Empty weight: 1,270 kg (2,800 lb)
- Gross weight: 1,698 kg (3,743 lb)
- Powerplant: 1 × Hispano-Suiza 12Xbrs inline piston engine , 515 kW (690 hp)

Performance

- Maximum speed: 345 km/h (214 mph, 186 kn)
- Service ceiling: 10,300 m (33,790 ft)
