= Hispano-Suiza 12M =

12M
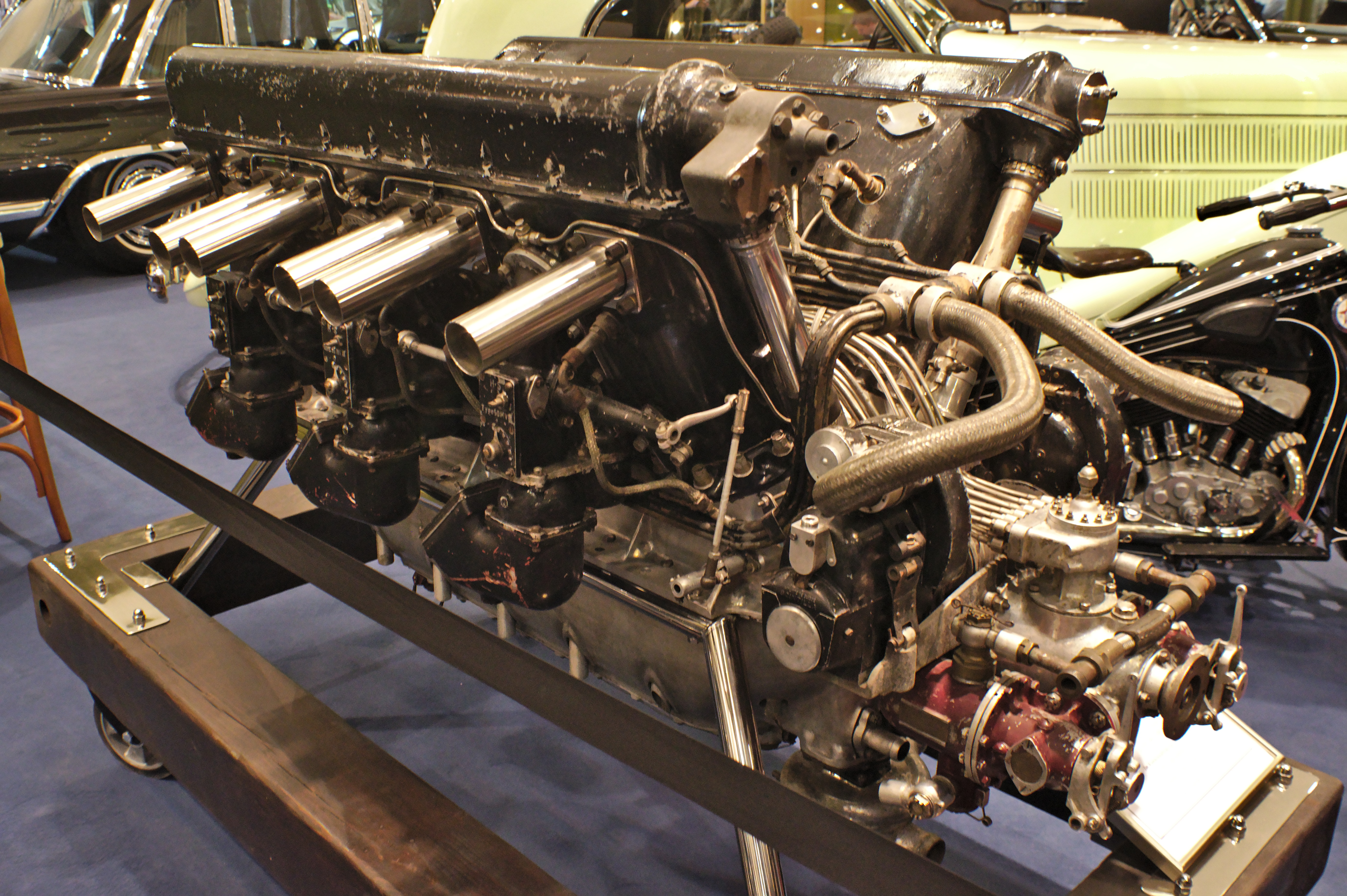
- Type: V-12
- National origin: France
- Manufacturer: Société Francaise Hispano-Suiza
- Designer: Marc Birkigt
- First run: 1927

The Hispano-Suiza 12M was one of two new V-12 engine designs first run in 1927–1928. It produced about 375 kW (500 hp), was the first to use gas nitride hardening and introduced wet cylinder liners into Hispano-Suiza's aircraft engine range.

== Design and development ==
Up to 1927, Hispano-Suiza's many engine types, of various layouts and cylinder numbers, were all recognisable developments of the World War I V-8 Hispano-Suiza 8. 1927-8 saw the introduction of four completely new engines, two V-12s and two with six cylinders inline. The Hispano-Suiza 12M, known by the manufacturers as the Type 57, was the smaller of the V-12s, with a displacement of 27.0 L (1,648 cu in), the other being the 36.0 L (2,197 cu in) 12N. Apart from capacity and power, these two engines had much in common. The 12M first ran in 1927 and the 12N a year later.

Both 12M and 12N were 60° V engines with carburettors, inlets and exhausts on the outer faces. There were three carburettors per bank, each charging a pair of cylinders. Much of the new technology was in the cylinder design: these types introduced wet liners, an Hispano automobile engine innovation which brought the cooling water into direct contact with the steel cylinder barrel rather than by screwing it into an aluminium water jacket. This improved cooling, simplified assembly and allowed larger cylinder bores without increasing their separation. The cylinder barrels were open at top and bottom and threaded for screwing into the block only near the top, with valve seats ground into the aluminium cylinder head. The lower end of the barrel extended into the crankcase, simplifying both manufacture and assembly. Block and crankcase were bolted together.

The 12M and 12N engines were the first to use the gas nitriding surface hardening process on the cylinder walls, which reduced both wear and oil consumption. They also used a novel, complicated but effective method of main bearing cooling, enhancing the local lubricant flow without requiring high overall oil pump speeds.

Both types were designed so that epicyclic gearing could be added or removed quickly; some earlier Hispano-Suiza engines offered gearing but as a permanent fixture on a specific sub-type. The Farman gears added 45 kg (99 lb) to the weight.

The first commercial version of the 12M was the 12Mb of 1929. This had a compression ratio of 6.2 and a maximum power output of 432 kW (580 hp) at a speed of 2,100 rpm. In geared-down form it became the 12Mbr. These both had aluminium crankcases but the next model, the 12Mc of 1930, replaced the aluminium with Elektron metal both there and in other previously aluminium components. Though rather brittle, Elektron metal has only 2/3 the density of aluminium and the result was a 20 kg (44 lb) weight reduction from the 12Mb to the 12Mc. The 12Mc also had an increased compression ratio of 7.0, raising the power from the nominal 478 kW (575 hp) of the 12Mb to 477 kW (640 hp). The model 12Md retained the Elektron metal components but returned to the 6.2 compression ratio of the 12Mb. Both 12Mc and 12Md had geared down versions, the 12Mcr and 12Mdr respectively.

The 12Mc was an early example of an attempt to solve the problem of falling engine power with increasing altitude; it was "undercharged", running lean at sea level and only developing its maximum power at 2,000 m (6,490 ft). A final 12M variant, the 12Mdsh run in 1932, addressed this problem differently; it was the first Hispano-Suiza engine to be supercharged, blown by a Rateau turbine. It produced 477 kW (640 hp) at 2,250 rpm at an altitude 2,950 m (9,678 ft). Test flown in a Dewoitine D.32, it maintained power up to 5,500 m (18,000 ft). The 12M series was developed into the 12X (Type 72) supercharged engine, first run in 1931.

== Operational history ==
The Swiss government, in the form of the KTA (Kriegstechnischen Abteilung or War Technical Department) purchased construction licences for the 12Mb and in 1932 sixty units were built at the Schweizerische Lokomotiv- und Maschinenfabrik factory.

A Blériot-SPAD S.91-7, powered by a 12Mc engine, set a 500 km closed-circuit record of 308.78 km/h (191.91 mph) on 2 June 1932.

== Variants ==
List from Hispano Suiza in Aeronautics.

12Mb/500
Compression ratio 6.2. Nominal power 428 kW (575 hp) at 2,000 rpm.
12Mbr/500
Compression ratio 6.2. Nominal power 421 kW (565 hp) at 2,000 rpm. As 12Mb but with Farman reducer.
12Mc/500
Compression ratio 7.0. Nominal power 477 kW (640 hp) at 2,200 rpm. Elektron crankcase and other components.
12Mcr/500
As 12Mc but with Farman reducer.
12Md
Compression ratio 6.2. Nominal power 428 kW (575 hp) at 2,100 rpm. Elektron crankcase and other components.
12Mdr
As 12Md but with Farman reducer.
12Mdsh
Nominal power 477 kW (640 hp) at 2,250 rpm and altitude 2,950 m (9,678 ft). First supercharged version.

== Applications ==
- Blériot-SPAD 91-7
- Dewoitine D.32
- Lioré et Olivier LeO 252, 235, 234, 236
- Nieuport-Delage 622 and 629

== Specifications (12Mbr/500) ==
Data from Hispano-Suiza in Aeronautics.

=== General characteristics ===
- Type: V-12, water cooled
- Bore: 130 mm (5.12 in)
- Stroke: 170 mm (6.69 in)
- Displacement: 27.0 L (1,648 cu in)
- Dry weight: 455 kg (1,003 lb)

=== Components ===
- Reduction gear: 2:1

=== Performance ===
- Power output: (normal) 421 kW (565 hp) at 2,000 rpm
- Compression ratio: 6.2

== See also ==
Related lists

- List of aircraft engines
