= Nieuport-Delage NiD 62 =

French sesquiplane fighter

NiD.62
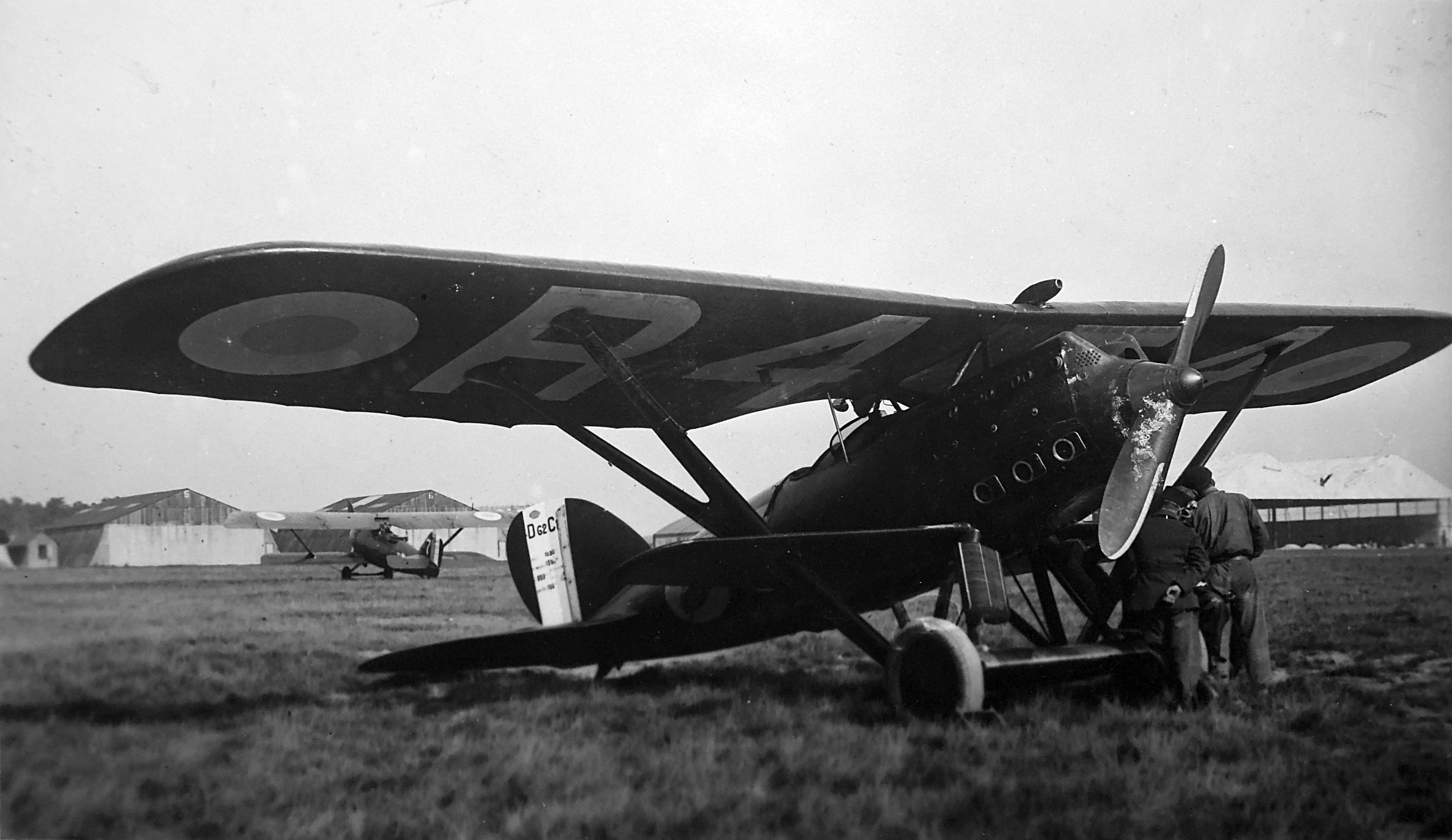
- Nieuport-Delage NiD.62 C1

General information
- Type: Fighter, later fighter trainer
- Manufacturer: Nieuport-Delage
- Status: retired
- Primary user: Armée de l'Air

History
- Introduction date: 1931
- First flight: January 1928

The Nieuport-Delage NiD.62 was a French sesquiplane fighter from the early 1930s. This machine was a descendant of a long line of Nieuport-Delage fighters that were designed and built during the years immediately after World War I. The NiD.62 was built in 1931 as a fighter for the Armée de l'Air. It served until the late 1930s, when it was replaced by more modern monoplane fighters. By the time of the outbreak of World War II in September 1939, all of the NiD.62s had been withdrawn from front-line fighter escadrilles but were used as trainers in French flight schools. A few aircraft were employed as target tugs. After the French German Armistice and German occupation of North and West part of France in June 1940, the German Luftwaffe had no interest in the NiD.62s and they were scrapped. None survived the war.

== Variants ==
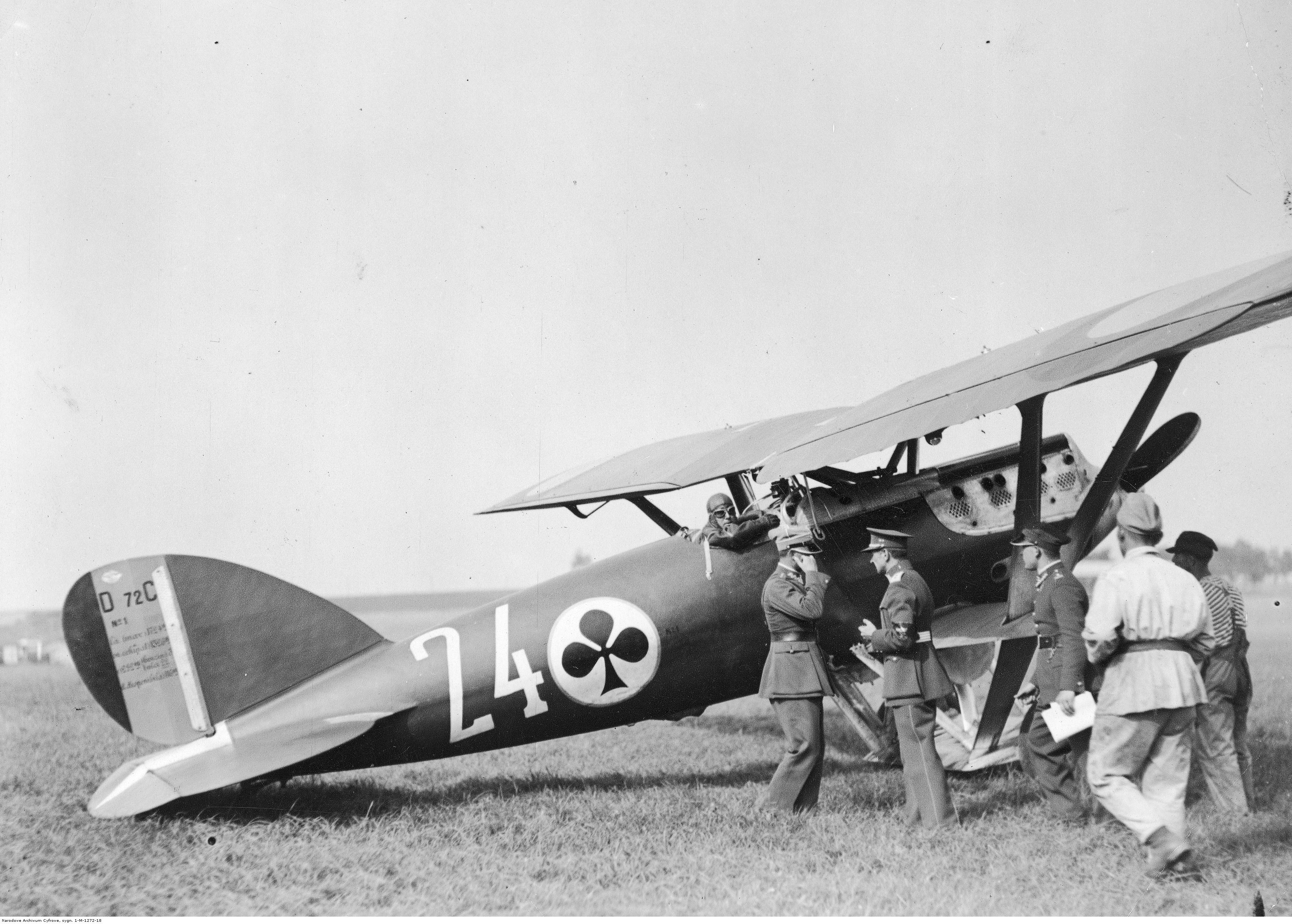
A Romanian NiD.72 in 1929

Nieuport-Delage NiD.62
Single-seat fighter aircraft, powered by a 500 hp (370 kW) Hispano-Suiza 12Hb.
Nieuport-Delage NiD.621
Twin-float fighter-trainer, powered by a 500 hp (370 kW) Hispano-Suiza 12Hb; Three built.
Nieuport-Delage NiD.622
Single-seat fighter aircraft, powered by a 500 hp (370 kW) Hispano-Suiza 12Mdsh piston engine.
Nieuport-Delage NiD.623
One NiD.622 converted for speed records, powered by a 600 hp (450 kW) Lorraine 12Fd Courlis.
Nieuport-Delage NiD.624
One NiD.622 converted for racing, powered by a 600 hp (450 kW) Lorraine 12Fd Courlis.
Nieuport-Delage NiD.625
One NiD.622 converted for parachute experiments.
Nieuport-Delage NiD.626
Export NiD.622, 12 ordered by Peru in 1933 but Nieuport-Delage NiD.123s delivered instead, powered by 500 hp (370 kW) Lorraine 12Hdr engines.
Nieuport-Delage NiD.628
2 prototypes powered by a 500 hp (370 kW) Hispano-Suiza 12Mc engine.
Nieuport-Delage NiD.629
50 built with modified wing and ailerons, powered by a 500 hp (370 kW) Hispano-Suiza 12Mdsh engine.
Nieuport-Delage NiD.72
All-metal version powered by a 600 hp (450 kW) Hispano-Suiza 12Lb engine. Aside from the prototype, three were built for Belgium for evaluation, four went to Brazil which saw action, and three were built for Romania with wooden fuselages.
Nieuport-Delage NiD.82
Single all-metal prototype powered by a 500 hp (370 kW) Lorraine 12Ha.

== Operators ==
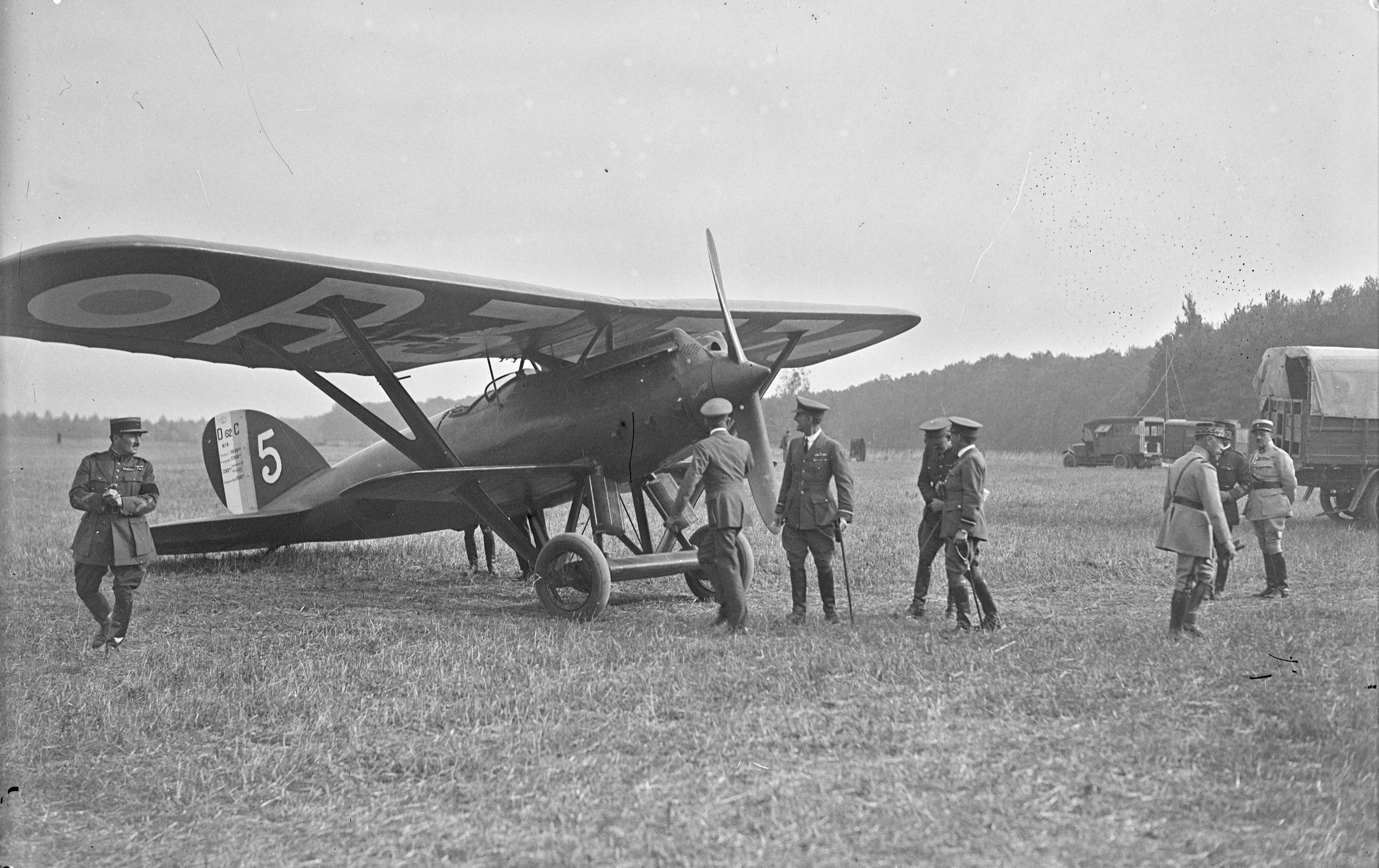
A French NiD 62 in 1928

Brazil

- Brazilian Air Force
- Paulista rebels

France

- French Air Force
- French Aéronavale

Peru

- Peruvian Air Force

Romania

- Royal Romanian Air Force

Turkey

- Turkish Air Force

== Specifications (NiD.622) ==
Data from Aviafrance, and A Gallic Rarity...The 'One-and-a-Half' Nieuport-Delage

General characteristics

- Crew: 1
- Length: 7.64 m (25 ft 1 in)
- Wingspan: 12 m (39 ft 4 in)
- Height: 3 m (9 ft 10 in)
- Wing area: 28.95 m^{2} (311.6 sq ft)
- Empty weight: 1,324 kg (2,919 lb)
- Gross weight: 1,831 kg (4,037 lb)
- Max takeoff weight: 1,880 kg (4,145 lb)
- Powerplant: 1 × Hispano-Suiza 12Hb V-12 liquid-cooled piston engine, 373 kW (500 hp)
- Propellers: 2-bladed fixed-pitch propeller

Performance

- Maximum speed: 270 km/h (170 mph, 150 kn) at sea level
- Range: 900 km (560 mi, 490 nmi)
- Service ceiling: 8,200 m (26,900 ft)
- Time to altitude:

- 3,000 m (9,800 ft) in 5 minutes 18 seconds
- 4,000 m (13,000 ft) 7 minutes 30 seconds

Armament

- Guns: 2 × fixed forward-firing 7.7 mm (0.303 in) machine guns in forward fuselage

== See also ==
Related lists

- List of Interwar military aircraft

== Bibliography ==
- Bruner, Georges (1977). "Fighters a la Francaise, Part One". Air Enthusiast (3): 85–95. ISSN 0143-5450.
- Green, William and Gordon Swanborough. "A Gallic Rarity...The 'One-and-a-Half' Nieuport-Delage". Air International, February 1990, Vol 38 No 2. pp. 75–83, 92–93, 97. ISSN 0306-5634
- Green, William and Gordon Swanborough. The Complete Book of Fighters. New York: Smithmark, 1994. ISBN 0-8317-3939-8
