= S60 =

S60 or S-60 may refer to:

== Automobiles ==
- S-60 (tractor), a Soviet tractor
- Toyota Crown (S60), a sedan
- Volvo S60, a compact executive car

== Aviation ==
- Blériot-SPAD S.60, a French biplane fighter
- Kenmore Air Harbor, in Kenmore, Washington, United States
- Sikorsky S-60, a prototype American flying crane

== Consumer electronics ==
- S60 (software platform), for mobile devices
- Canon PowerShot S60, a digital camera
- Cat S60, a mobile phone
- Pentax Optio S60, a digital camera

== Rail and transit ==
- S60 (Long Island bus), United States
- S60 (RER Fribourg), a railway line in Switzerland
- S60, a regional railway service operating over the Lugano–Ponte Tresa Railway in Ticino, Switzerland
- S60, a line of the Stuttgart S-Bahn in Germany
- S60, a line of the Vienna S-Bahn in Austria

== Other uses ==
- AZP S-60, a Soviet anti-aircraft gun
- INS Sindhukesari (S60), a submarine of the Indian Navy
- S60: This material and its container must be disposed of as hazardous waste, a safety phrase
- S60-class submarine, of the Spanish Navy
- S60 Shangqiu–Dengfeng Expressway, in China
- S60, a postcode district Rotherham, England
