= Pentax Optio =

Series of digital cameras

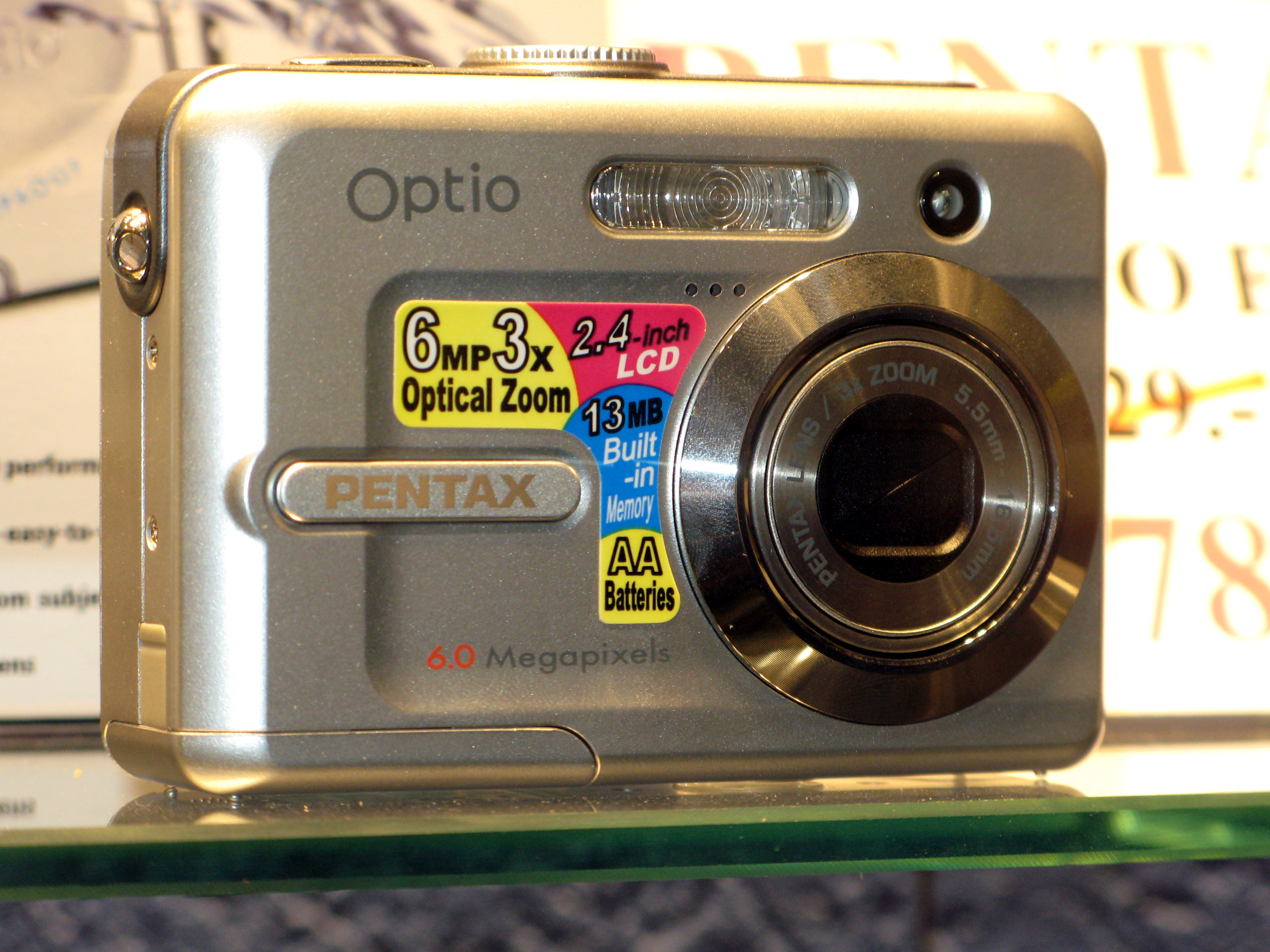
The Pentax Optio E20

The Pentax Optio series is a line of consumer digital cameras manufactured by Pentax Corporation. It consists mostly of point-and-shoot cameras, and encompasses the bulk of Pentax's lower-end camera models. These products typically range in cost from US$200-US$500, with specific "W" models targeted for underwater and outdoor use.

== Models ==
Model	Image Sensor (MP)	Zoom	LCD	Waterproof	Other
Pentax Optio 230	2.0	3x	1.6"	No	optical viewfinder, 3D mode
Pentax Optio 30	3.2	3x	1.6"	No	optical viewfinder, 16 MB internal storage
Pentax Optio 330				No	
Pentax Optio 330GS	3.2		1.6"	No	
Pentax Optio 330RS				No	
Pentax Optio 33L	3.2			No	
Pentax Optio 33LF				No	
Pentax Optio 33WR	3.2	2.8x	1.6"	No	water resistant, optical viewfinder
Pentax Optio 430				No	
Pentax Optio 430RS				No	
Pentax Optio 43WR	4	2.8x	1.6"	No	water resistant, optical viewfinder
Pentax Optio 450	4	5x	1.5"	No	
Pentax Optio 50	5	3x	1.8"	No	
Pentax Optio 50L				No	
Pentax Optio 550	5	5x	1.5"	No	
Pentax Optio 555	5	5x		No	
Pentax Optio 60	6	3x		No	
Pentax Optio 750Z	7	5x		No	
Pentax Optio A10	8	3x	2.5"	No	Shake reduction
Pentax Optio A20	10	3x		No	Released Oct 2006 @ US$309
Pentax Optio A30	10	3x	2.5"	No	
Pentax Optio A40	12	3x	2.5"	No	
Pentax Optio E10				No	
Pentax Optio E20				No	
Pentax Optio E30	7.1	3x	2.4"	No	
Pentax Optio E40	8	3x	2.4"	No	
Pentax Optio E50	8.1	3x		No	
Pentax Optio E60				No	
Pentax Optio E70				No	
Pentax Optio E70L				No	
Pentax Optio E80	10	3x	2.7"	No	
Pentax Optio E85				No	
Pentax Optio E90	10.1	3x	2.7"	No	
Pentax Optio H90	12.1	5x	2.7"	No	
Pentax Optio I-10	12.1	5x	2.7"	No	
Pentax Optio LS465				No	
Pentax Optio M10				No	
Pentax Optio M20	7	3x	2.5"	No	
Pentax Optio M30	7.1	3x	1.6"	No	
Pentax Optio M40	8	3x	2.5"	No	
Pentax Optio M50	8	5x		No	
Pentax Optio MX				No	
Pentax Optio MX4				No	
Pentax Optio NB1000				No	
Pentax Optio P70				No	
Pentax Optio P80	12	4x	2.7"	No	
Pentax Optio RS1000	14.1	4x	3.0"	No	
Pentax Optio RS1500				No	
Pentax Optio RZ10	14.1	10x	2.7"	No	
Pentax Optio RZ18	16	18x	3.0"	No	
Pentax Optio S				No	
Pentax Optio S1				No	
Pentax Optio S10	8	3x	2.5"	No	
Pentax Optio S12				No	
Pentax Optio S4	4	3×	1.6"	No	CCD Sensor 1/2,5" 5.8 × 4.3 mm
Pentax Optio S40	4	3x	1.6"	No	
Pentax Optio S45				No	
Pentax Optio S4i	4	3x	1.8"	No / 130' w/housing	+optical viewfinder; O-WP2 dive housing
Pentax Optio S50				No	
Pentax Optio S55	5	3x		No	
Pentax Optio S5i	5	3x	1.8"	No / 130' w/housing	+optical viewfinder; O-WP2 dive housing
Pentax Optio S5n				No	
Pentax Optio S5z				No	
Pentax Optio S6				No	
Pentax Optio S60	6.0	3.0x	2.5"	No	
Pentax Optio S7				No	
Pentax Optio SV	5	5x		No	
Pentax Optio T10	6.4	3×	3.0"	No	CCD Sensor 1/2.5" 5.8 × 4.3 mm
Pentax Optio T20				No	
Pentax Optio T30				No	
Pentax Optio V10	6	3x	3.0"	No	
Pentax Optio V20				No	
Pentax Optio VS20	16	20x	3.0"	No	Digital zoom 7.2x, no optical viewfinder
Pentax Optio W10	6	3x	2.5"	Yes	
Pentax Optio W20				Yes	
Pentax Optio W30	7	3x	2.5"	Yes	
Pentax Optio W60	10	5x	2.5"	Yes 13 feet (4.0 m)	
Pentax Optio W80	12.1	5x	2.5"	Yes	
Pentax Optio W90	12.1	5x	2.7"	Yes	
Pentax Optio WG-1	14			Yes	GPS version available
Pentax Optio WG-2	16	5x	3"	Yes	GPS version available
Pentax WG-3	16	4x	3"	Yes up to 45'	GPS version available
Pentax Optio WP				Yes	
Pentax Optio WPi	6	3x	2.0"	Yes	
Pentax Optio WS80	10	5x	2.7"	Yes	
Pentax Optio X				No	
Pentax Optio X70				No	
Pentax Optio X90	12.1	26x	2.7"	No	
Pentax Optio Z10	8	7x	2.5"	No	

Note: current models are highlighted in blue.

== Gallery ==
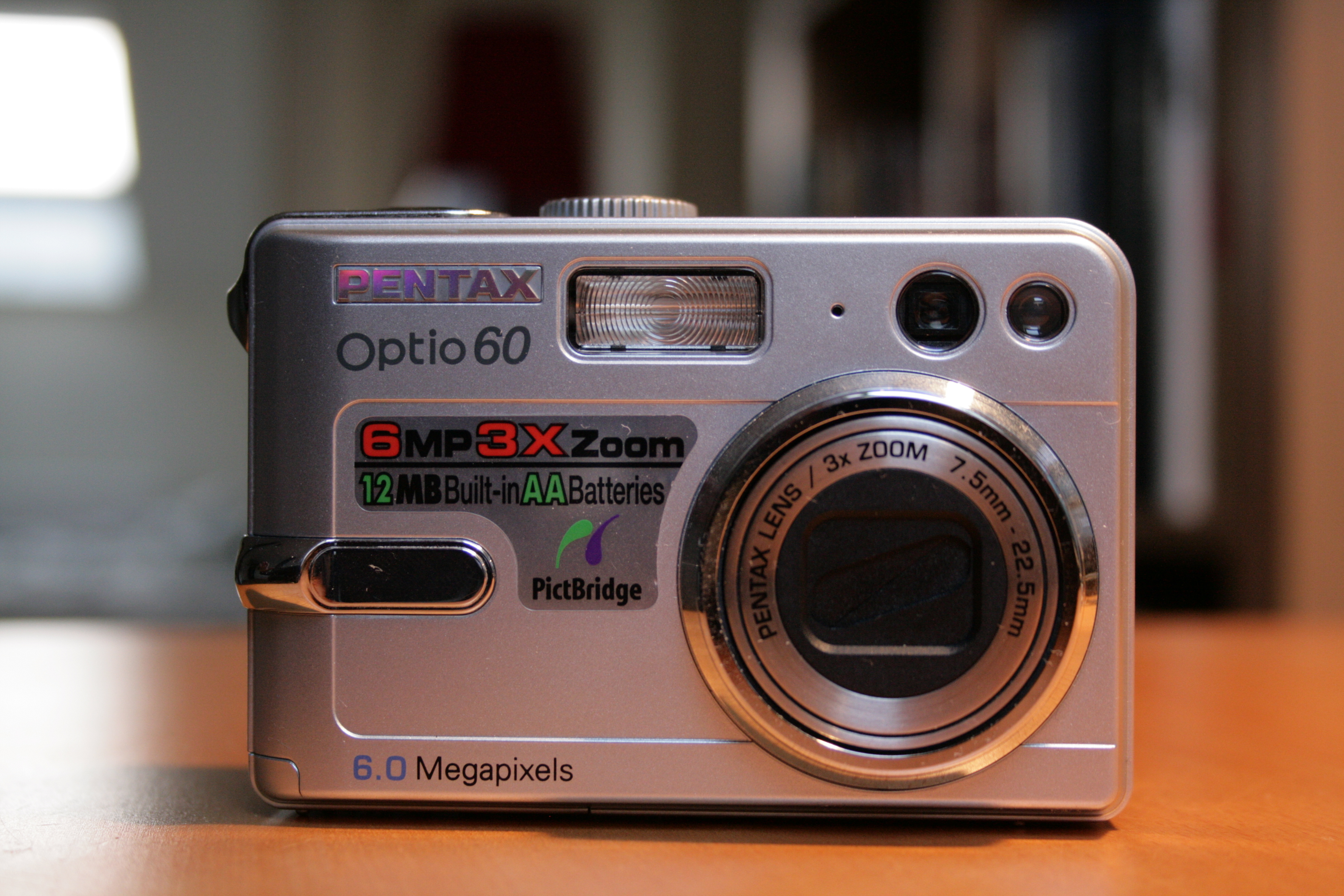
Pentax Optio 60

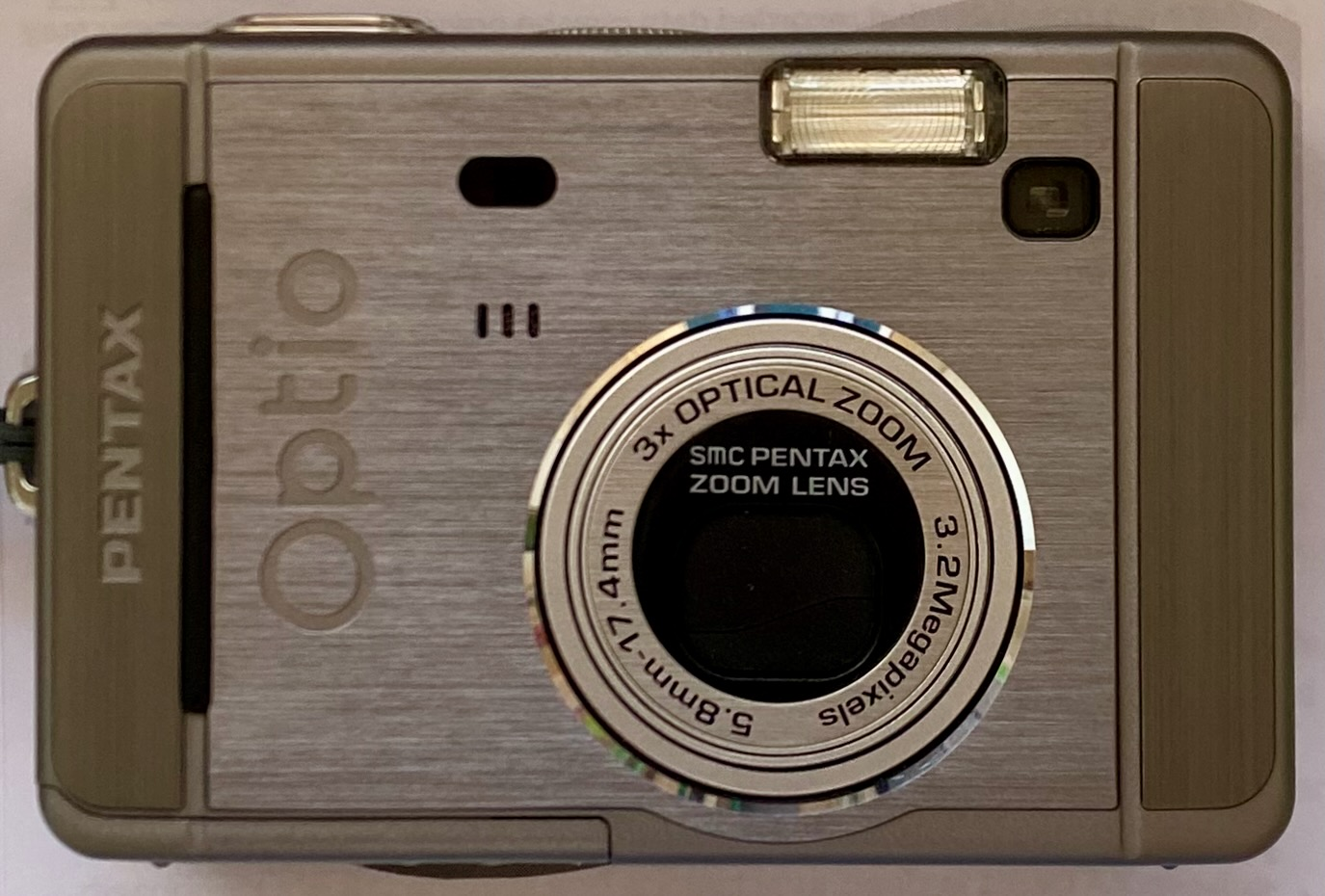
Pentax Optio S30

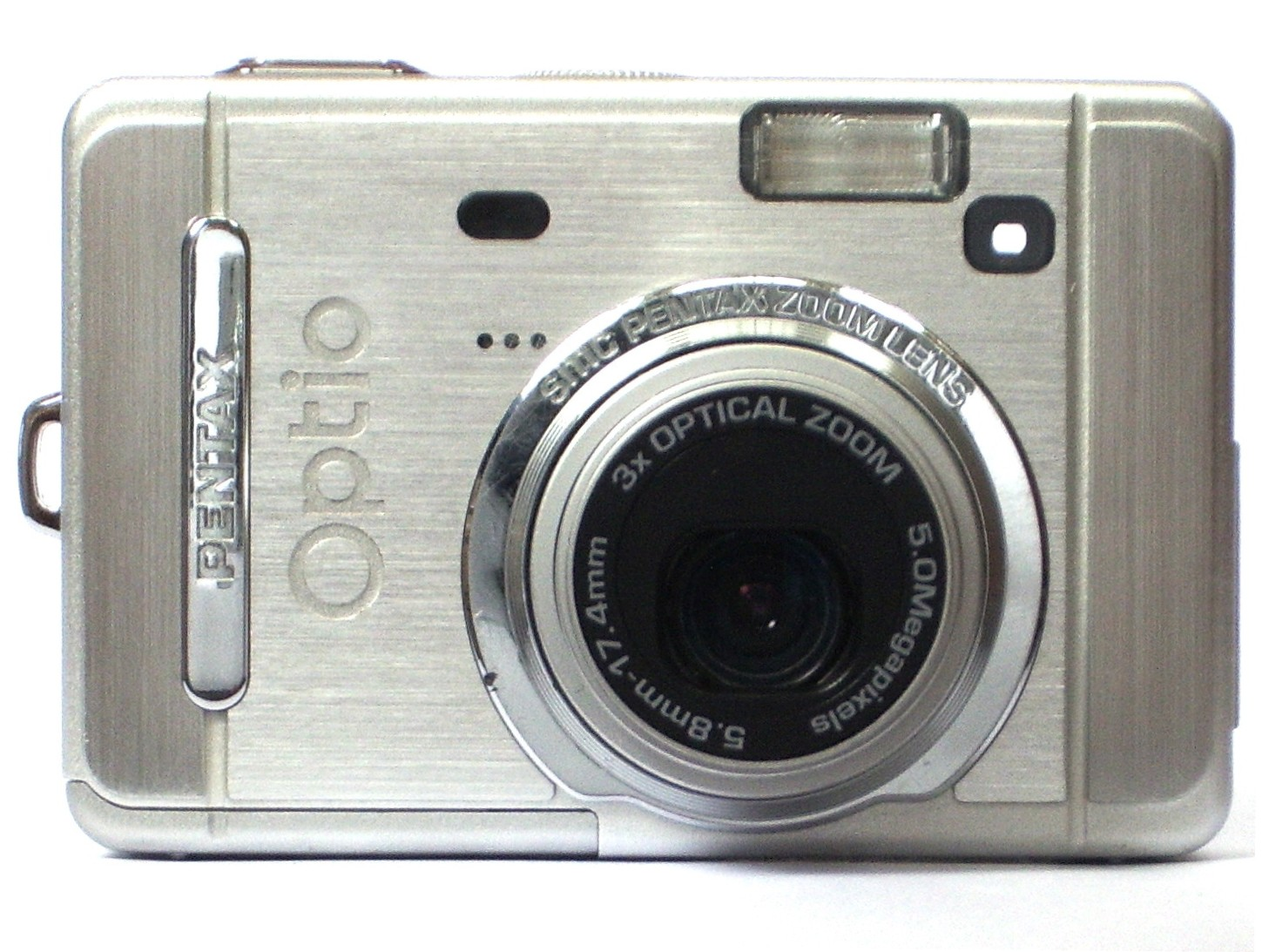
Pentax Optio S50

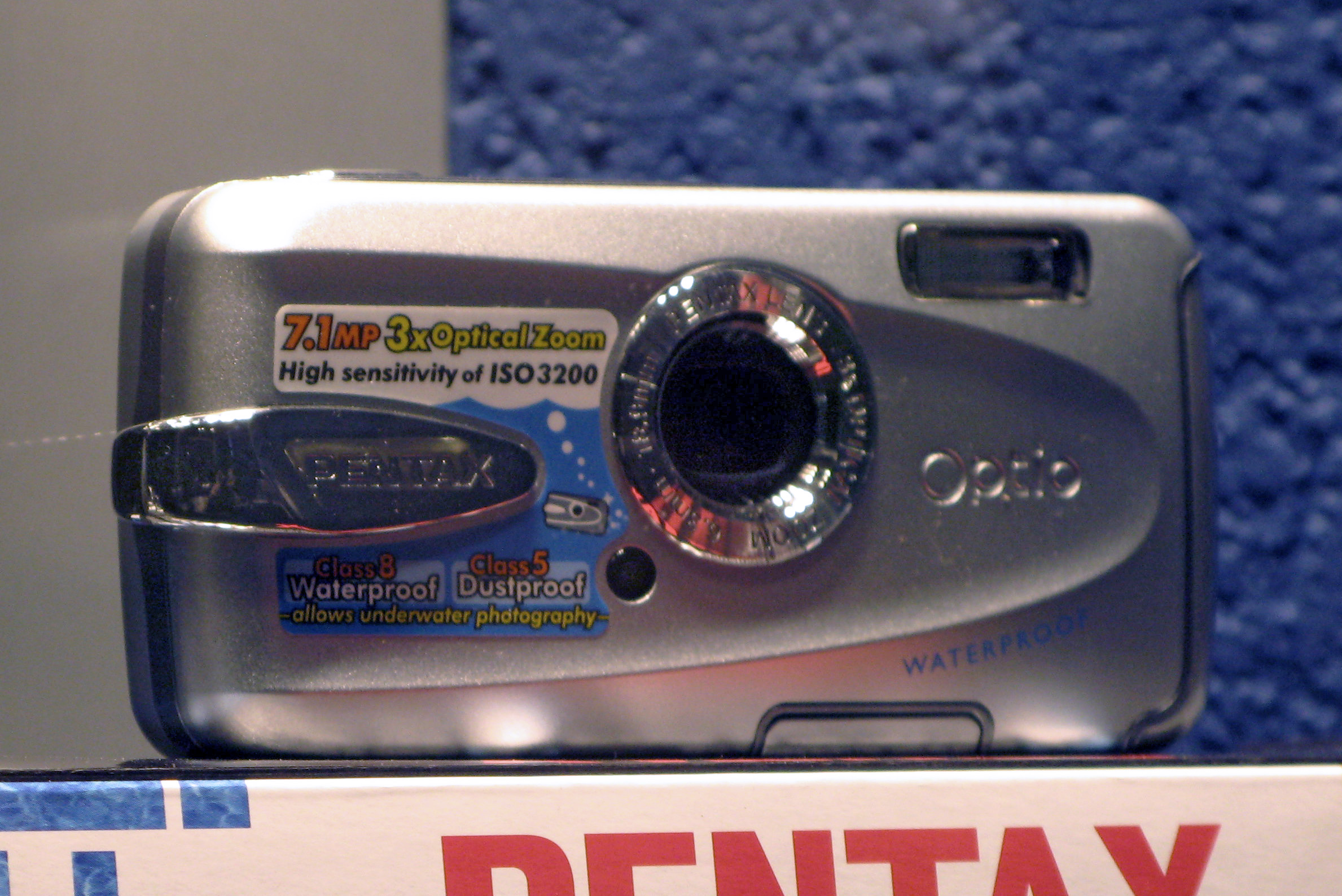
Pentax Optio W30

== See also ==
- Fujifilm FinePix T-series
- List of Pentax products
- Olympus VR-310
