= Potez 230 =

General information
- Type: Fighter aircraft
- National origin: France
- Manufacturer: Société Nationale de Constructions Aéronautiques du Nord (SNCAN)
- Status: Prototype
- Number built: 1

History
- First flight: 30 March 1940
- Developed from: ANF Les Mureaux 190

The Potez 230 was a French lightweight single-seat, single-engined fighter aircraft. One prototype was built and flew in 1940, but no production followed, with the prototype being captured and shipped to Germany for study.

== Design and development ==
In 1936, ANF Les Mureaux designed and flew the ANF Les Mureaux 190, a lightweight single-engined fighter aircraft powered by a 340 kW (450 hp) ANF Les Mureaux 190 engine and with a fixed undercarriage. The unreliability of the engine caused the 190 to be abandoned in 1937. Despite this setback, and the nationalisation of ANF Les Mureaux to form part of the state-owned SNCAN combine, the former design team of Les Mureaux, René Lemaitre and Hubert led by André Brunet, did not abandon the concept of lightweight fighters, and in 1938, began work on the Potez 230, (Note: All SNCAN designs, no matter what part of the conglomerate they originated from, were named as Potez aircraft owing to the prestige associated with the name.) a more advanced development of the Les Mureaux 190.

Like the earlier aircraft, the Potez 230 was a low-wing cantilever monoplane, with a similar elliptical wing. The wings were built around an integral torsion box, the first example of this structure to have flown, and were fitted with split trailing-edge flaps. The aircraft's fuselage was of oval cross-section, with the pilot accommodated in an enclosed cockpit. The aircraft was powered by a 500 kW (670 hp) Hispano-Suiza 12Xcrs V12 engine driving a three-bladed Ratier propeller in a tractor configuration. Armament was planned to be a single Hispano-Suiza 20 mm cannon mounted between the engine cylinder banks and firing through the propeller, with four 7.5 mm machine guns to be mounted in the wings.

The unarmed prototype made its maiden flight at Villacoublay on 30 March 1940. Testing was relatively trouble-free, with the aircraft reaching a speed of 439 km/h (273 mph) at sea level and 560 km/h (348 mph) at 5,000 m (16,400 ft), with it being planned to fit a more powerful Hispano-Suiza 12Y engine. The German invasion of France disrupted testing, however, with the prototype captured by the Germans when they seized Villacoublay airfield in June 1940. The Germans were interested in the novel wing torsion box, and the prototype, together with all available drawings and data, was shipped to Germany for closer study.

== Specifications ==
Data from The Complete Book of Fighters

General characteristics

- Crew: 1
- Length: 7.57 m (24 ft 10 in)
- Wingspan: 8.74 m (28 ft 8 in)
- Height: 2.18 m (7 ft 2 in)
- Wing area: 10.97 m^{2} (118.1 sq ft)
- Gross weight: 1,800 kg (3,968 lb)
- Powerplant: 1 × Hispano-Suiza 12Xcrs liquid-cooled V12 engine, 500 kW (670 hp)

Performance

- Maximum speed: 560 km/h (350 mph, 300 kn) at 5,000 m (16,400 ft)
- Endurance: 1.5 hr

Armament
(planned)

- 1× 20 mm cannon and four 7.5 mm machine guns

== See also ==
Related development

- ANF Les Mureaux 190

Aircraft of comparable role, configuration, and era

- Arsenal VG-30
- Caudron C.714
