= Levasseur PL.6 =

PL.6
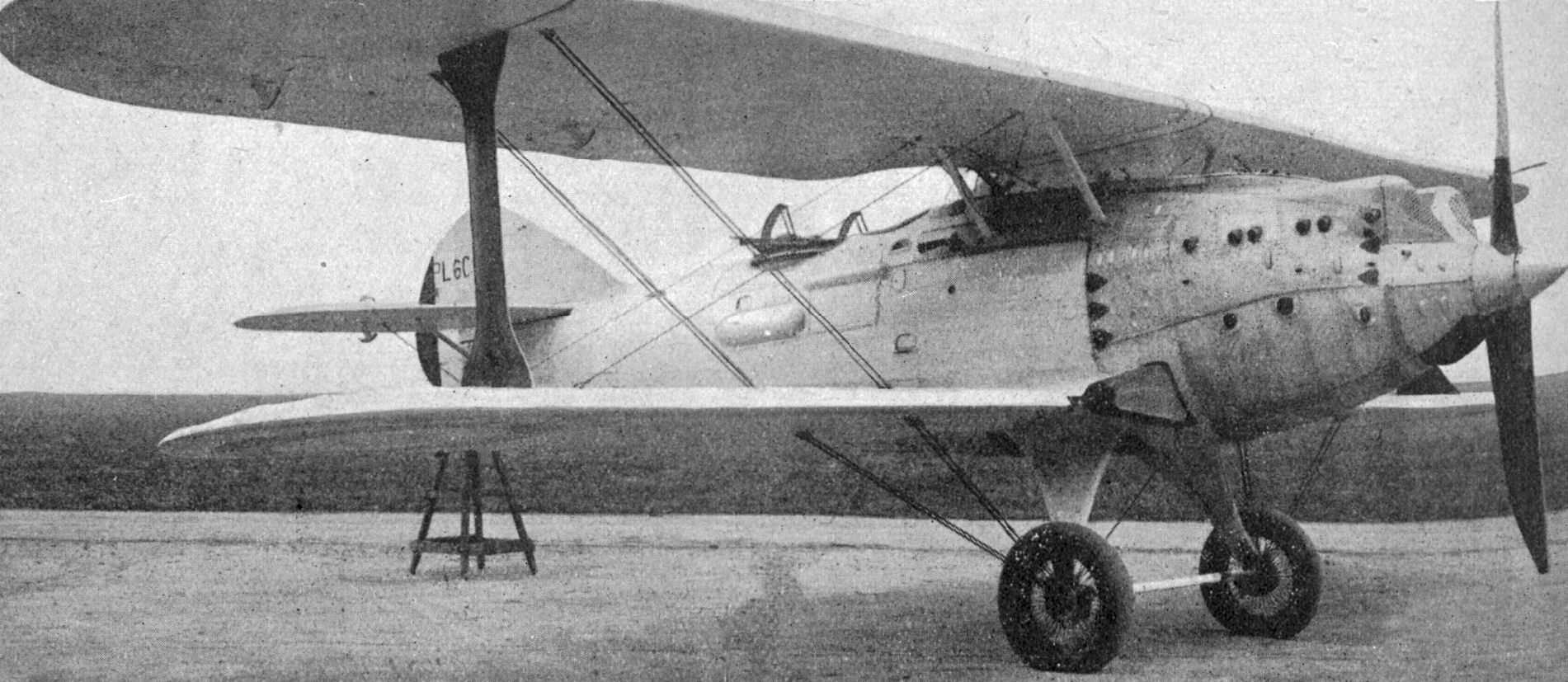

General information
- Type: Fighter
- National origin: France
- Manufacturer: Levasseur
- Number built: 1

History
- First flight: 1924

The Levasseur PL.6 C.2, also known as Levasseur VI C.2, was a two-seat fighter aircraft built in France in 1926 in order to meet a 1925 C.2 Service Technique de l'Aéronautique (STAé) specification, (C.2 - Chasseur 2 seat). Constructed along the same lines as Levasseur's naval aircraft of the same era, it was a conventional, single-bay biplane with seating for the pilot and tail gunner in separate, open cockpits. Flight testing of the prototype commenced in 1926, and it was exhibited at the Salon de l'Aéronautique at the end of the year.

The PL.6 was evaluated against the Aviméta 88, Les Mureaux 3, Les Mureaux 4, Blériot-SPAD S.60, Villiers XXIV and Wibault 12 Sirocco. However, before any one of these was selected for production, the requirement was cancelled. No further PL.6s were built.

== Specifications ==
Data from Jane's all the World's Aircraft 1928, Aviafrance:Levasseur PL 6

General characteristics

- Crew: 2
- Length: 8.75 m (28 ft 8 in)
- Wingspan: 12.2 m (40 ft 0 in)
- Height: 3.1 m (10 ft 2 in)
- Wing area: 40 m^{2} (430 sq ft)
- Empty weight: 1,350 kg (2,976 lb)
- Gross weight: 2,175 kg (4,795 lb)
- Powerplant: 1 × Hispano-Suiza 12Hb V-12 water-cooled piston engine, 370 kW (500 hp)
- Propellers: 2-bladed fixed pitch propeller

Performance

- Maximum speed: 215 km/h (134 mph, 116 kn) at 5,000 m (16,000 ft)
- Range: 700 km (430 mi, 380 nmi)
- Endurance: 3 hours 30 minutes
- Service ceiling: 7,000 m (23,000 ft)
- Wing loading: 54 kg/m^{2} (11 lb/sq ft)
- Power/mass: 0.1731 kW/kg (0.1053 hp/lb)

Armament

- 2 × fixed, forward-firing 7.7 mm (0.303 in) Vickers machine guns in the forward fuselage
- 2 × trainable, rearward-firing 7.7 mm (0.303 in) Lewis guns in the rear cockpit
