= S50 =

S50 may refer to:

== Automobiles ==
- BMW S50, an automobile engine
- Changan Ruixing S50, a Chinese MPV
- Daihatsu New Line (S50), a Japanese pickup truck
- Forthing Jingyi S50, a Chinese sedan
- Levdeo S50, a Chinese SUV
- Prince Skyline (S50), a Japanese sedan
- Suzuki Boulevard S50 a Japanese motorcycle
- Toyota Crown (S50), a Japanese luxury car
- Weiwang S50, a Chinese SUV

== Aviation ==
- Auburn Municipal Airport (Washington), in King County, Washington, United States
- Blériot-SPAD S.50, a French biplane airliner
- Letov Š-50, a prototype Czechoslovak military aircraft
- SIAI S.50, an Italian biplane fighter
- Sikorsky S-50, an American helicopter

== Electronics ==
- Canon PowerShot S50, a digital camera
- Cat S50, a mobile phone
- Nikon Coolpix S50, a digital camera
- Pentax Optio S50, a digital camera
- Roland S-50, a sampling keyboard
- Sirius S50, a satellite radio receiver
- ThinkCentre S50, a personal computer

== Naval vessels ==
- HMS Courageous (S50), a submarine of the Royal Navy
- SMS S50, a torpedo boat of the Imperial German Navy
- USS S-50 (SS-161), a submarine of the United States Navy

== Rail ==
- S50 (RER Fribourg), an S-Bahn line in Switzerland
- S50 (TILO), a rail service between Ticino, Switzerland, and Lombardy, Italy
- S50, a line of Vienna S-Bahn in Austria

== Other uses ==
- S-50 (Manhattan Project), a uranium enrichment effort
- 5th Ring Road, an expressway in Beijing, China
- Expressway S50 (Poland)
- S50: Do not mix with ... (to be specified by the manufacturer), a safety phrase
- Toyota S50, a Toyota S transmission
