= W80 =

W80 or W-80 may refer to:

- W80 (nuclear warhead)
- Ditrigonal dodecadodecahedron
- DSC-W80, a digital camera made by Sony
- PENTAX Optio W80, a digital camera
- Wakkanai Station, in Hokkaio, Japan
- Westland W-80, an American helicopter design
- W80, a classification in masters athletics
