= S-65 Stalinets =

Soviet tracked tractor

Stalinets S-65
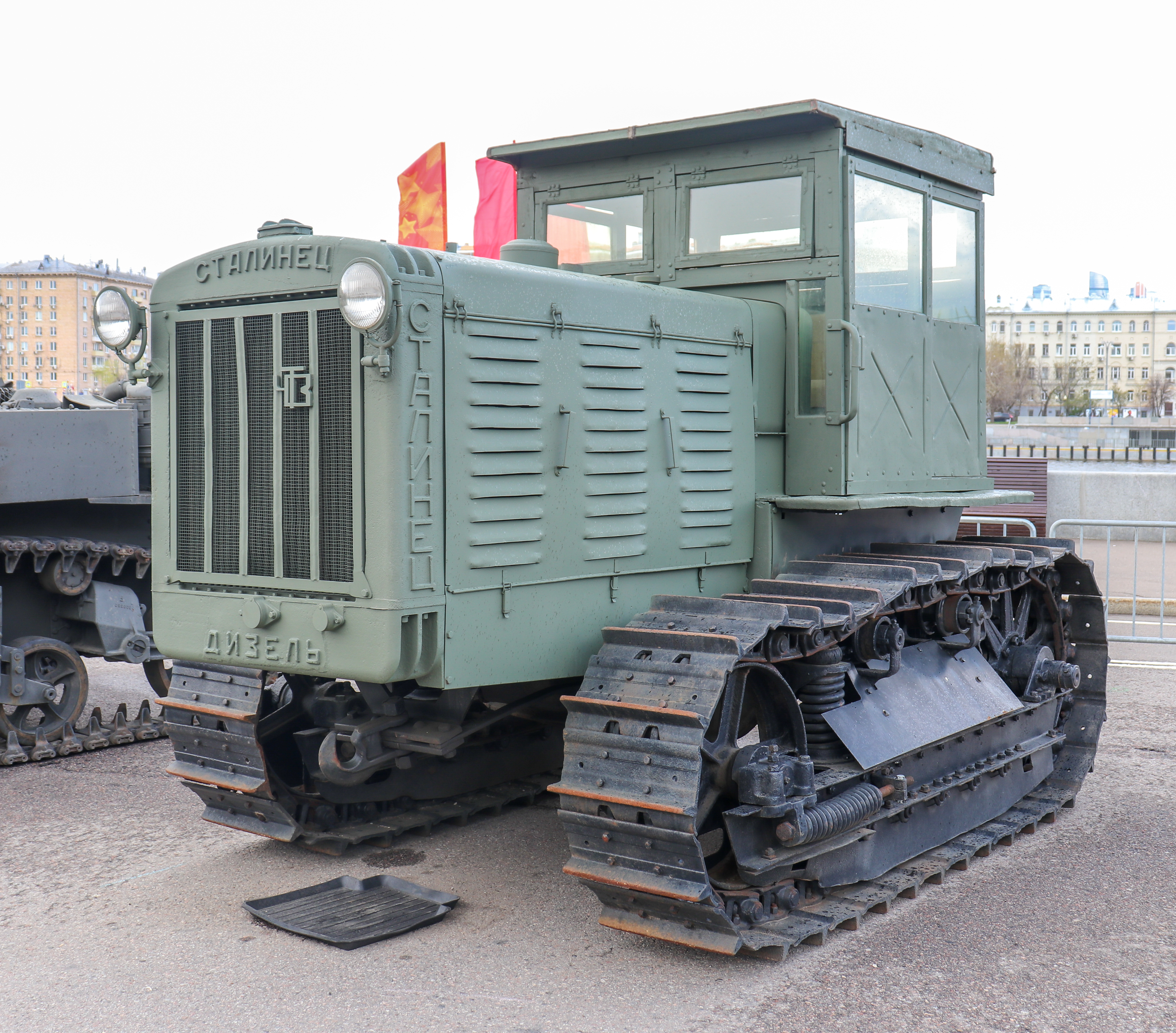
- The S-65 tractor
- Type: Agricultural, Military
- Manufacturer: Chelyabinsk Tractor Plant
- Production: 1937–1941
- Weight: 11 tonne
- Propulsion: Tracks

The S-65 tractor or Stalinets S-65 was an agricultural tractor built by the Chelyabinsk Tractor Factory (Chelyabinskii Traktornyi Zavod – ChTZ) from 1937 until 1941. These tractors were used in military service as they were widely available and capable of towing heavy guns.

== Description ==
This 11 tonne tractor features a large (13,540cc) four cylinder M-17 diesel engine in a prominent rectangular housing. The operator’s station was either open or enclosed and was designed for up to two crew. There were two common enclosures. One, made of wood was very rectangular while the second is an adapted cabin from a ZIS truck. The engine produced 65 horsepower and it had a top speed of 7 km/h. It is estimated it had an endurance/range of about 80 km.

== Development ==
In 1932, the Chelyabinsk tractor factory commenced operations and its first product was the S-60 tractor, a copy of the Caterpillar Sixty, which started production on 1 June, 1933. The following product, the S-65, featured the M-17 diesel engine generating 49-56 kW (60-72 hp). From 1937 until 1941, approximately 37,600 S-65s were produced.

== Operational notes ==
The Stalinets-60 and 65 tractors were typically assigned to heavy division and corps level weapons such as the 152mm ML-20 and even the much heavier 203mm B-4 howitzer. These tractors were also commonly used by tank recovery teams to extract damaged tanks and by engineer units to tow special equipment. The slow speed of these tractors (3–5 km/h when towing) meant that many were captured by the rapid moving Germans in the early part of the war. S-65 tractors were also used by North Korean forces (supplied by the Soviet Union) during the Korean War.

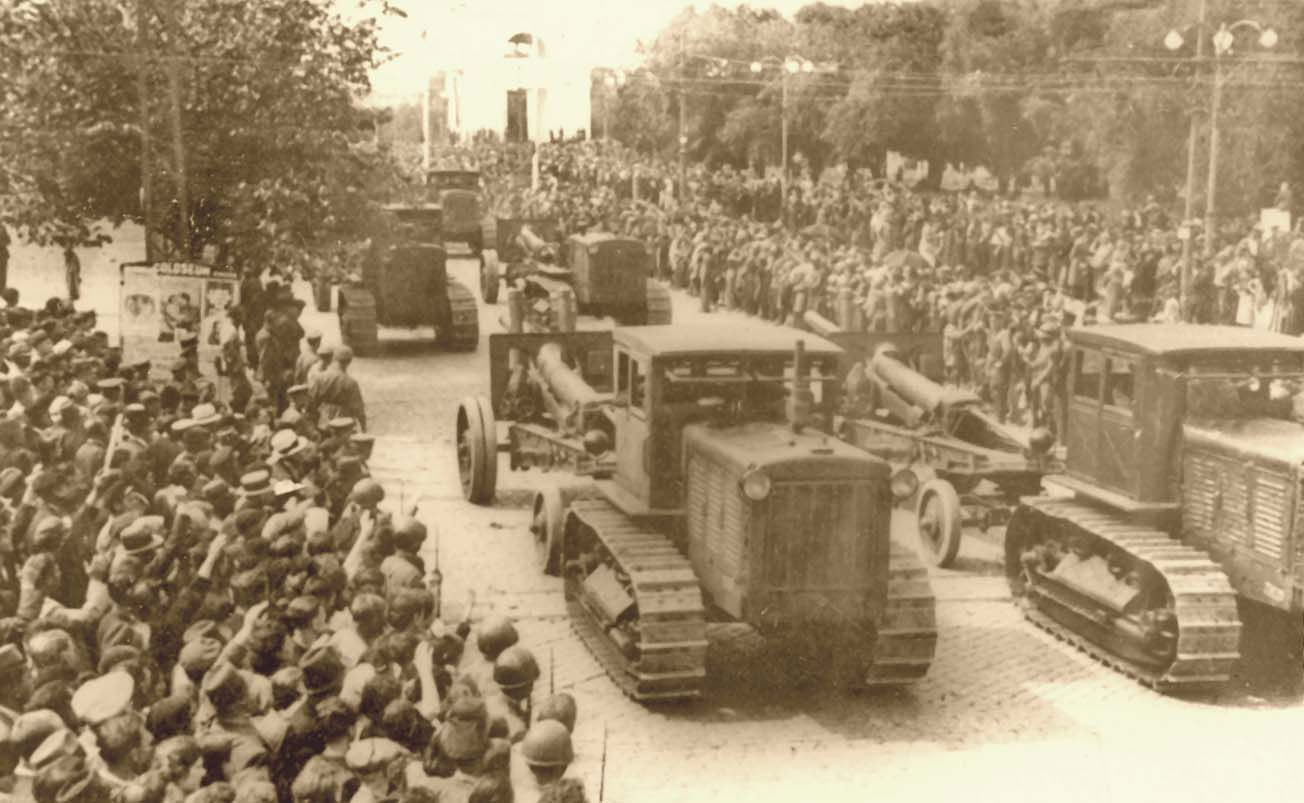
Several S-65 with heavy guns during a military parade in Chișinău, taken after the Soviet invasion of the Republic of Moldova (1940)
