= ANF Les Mureaux 170 =

1932 fighter aircraft by ANF Les Mureaux

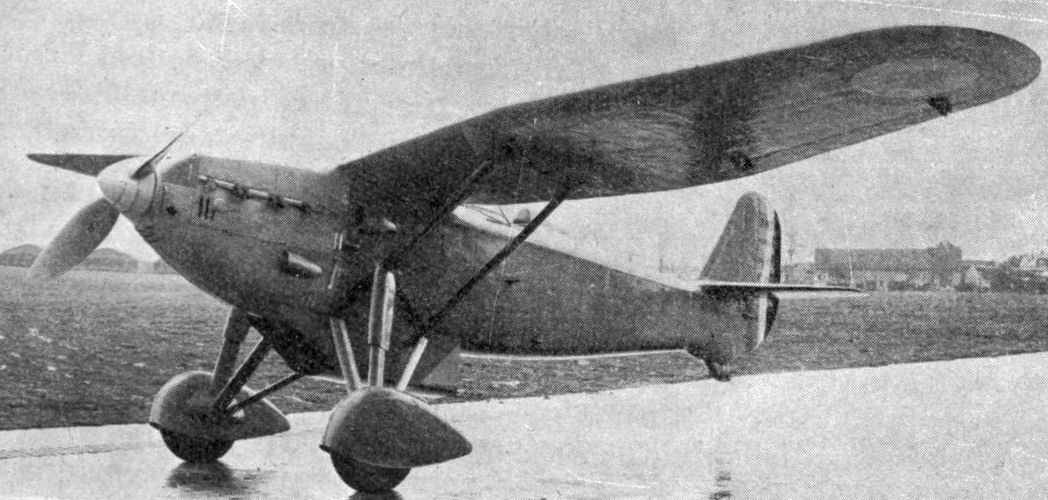

General information
- Type: Fighter aircraft
- National origin: France
- Manufacturer: ANF Les Mureaux
- Number built: 2

History
- First flight: 19 November 1932
- Variant: ANF Les Mureaux 180

The ANF Les Mureaux 170 was a prototype French fighter aircraft of the 1930s. It was a single-engined, single-seat parasol monoplane, but only two were built, the type being rejected for service by the French Air Force.

== Design and development ==
In 1930, the French Air Ministry issued a C.1 specification for a single-seat fighter, with the ability to reach 350 km/h (217 mph) and to be fitted with a supercharged engine. ANF Les Mureaux produced the ANF Les Mureaux 170, a parasol winged monoplane of all-metal construction powered by a single Hispano-Suiza 12Xbrs V12 engine. Its wings were slightly gulled and tapered out to give maximum chord and thickness midway along the wing, near where they were braced by struts to the fuselage. A fixed tailwheel undercarriage was fitted. The pilot sat in an open cockpit, and was armed by two Vickers machine guns mounted in the wings.

The first prototype flew on 19 November 1932, Although it demonstrated good performance, being described as the "fastest French service aircraft", it had a poor view from the cockpit when landing the aircraft, and despite a second prototype being flown in March 1934, the type was not chosen for production, with orders instead being placed for the Dewoitine D.500 and Blériot-SPAD S.510. It did, however, form the basis of the ANF Les Mureaux 180 two-seat fighter, also unsuccessful.

== Specifications ==
Data from The Complete Book of Fighters

General characteristics

- Crew: 1
- Length: 7.90 m (25 ft 11 in)
- Wingspan: 11.38 m (37 ft 4 in)
- Height: 3.00 m (9 ft 10 in)
- Wing area: 19.56 m^{2} (210.5 sq ft)
- Empty weight: 1,199 kg (2,643 lb)
- Gross weight: 1,670 kg (3,682 lb)
- Powerplant: 1 × Hispano-Suiza 12Xbrs liquid-cooled V12 engine, 510 kW (690 hp)

Performance

- Maximum speed: 380 km/h (240 mph, 210 kn) at 4,500 m (14,765 ft)
- Time to altitude: 23.4 min to 10,000 m (32,800 ft)

Armament

- Guns: 2 × 7.7 mm Vickers machine guns

== See also ==
- Blériot-SPAD S.510
- Dewoitine D.500

Related development

- ANF Les Mureaux 180
