= Olympus VR-310 =

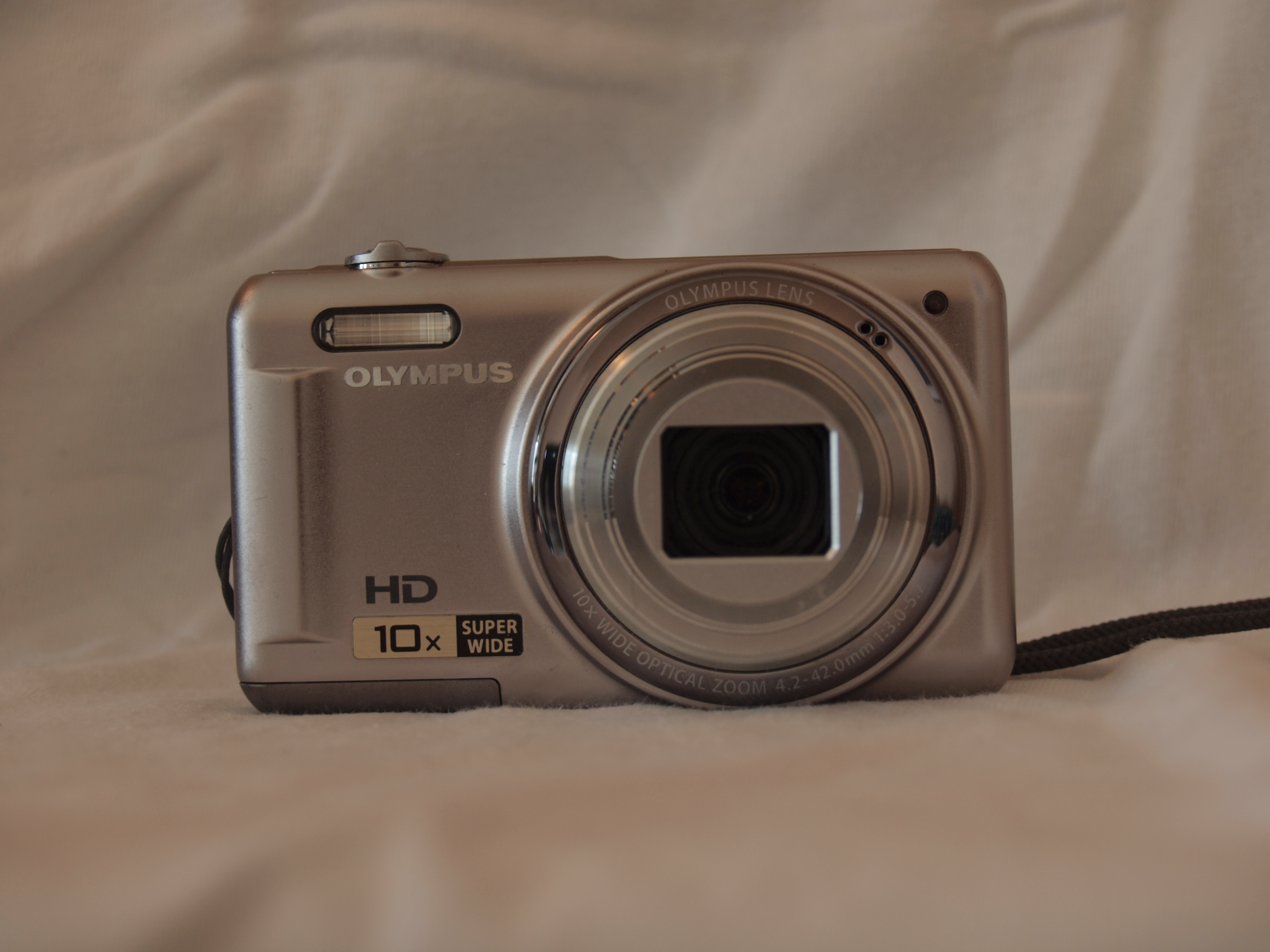

Overview
- Maker: Olympus
- Type: Compact digital camera
- Released: 2011

Lens
- Lens: 24-240 mm (10× optical zoom)

Sensor/medium
- Maximum resolution: 14 million pixels
- Storage media: SD cards, 33 MB internal memory

Focusing
- Focus modes: Auto focus with optional face detection

Exposure/metering
- Exposure metering: Full automatic, program automatic

Flash
- Flash: built-in flash

Viewfinder
- Viewfinder: none

General
- LCD screen: LCD with 230,000 pixels

The Olympus VR-310 is a compact digital camera with 10× optical zoom from Olympus.

It is available in four different colours: purple, silver, black, and red.

== See also ==
- Fujifilm FinePix T-series
- Pentax Optio
