= ANF Les Mureaux 180 =

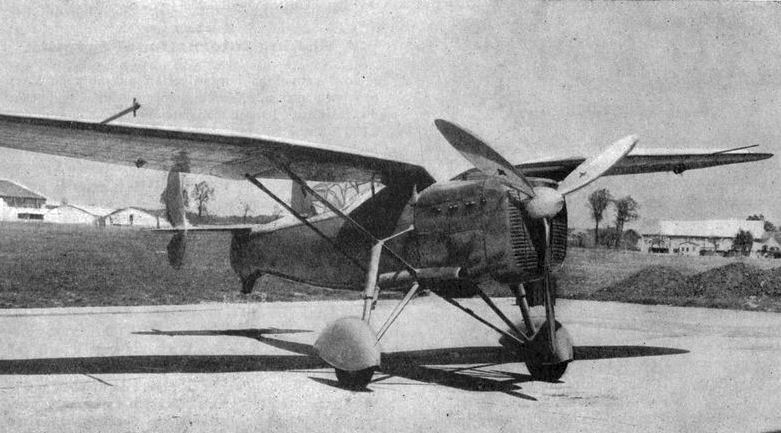

General information
- Type: Fighter aircraft
- National origin: France
- Manufacturer: ANF Les Mureaux
- Number built: 1

History
- First flight: 10 February 1935

The ANF Les Mureaux 180 was a prototype French fighter aircraft of the 1930s. designed and built by Les Ateliers de Construction du Nord de la France et des Mureaux. It was a single-engined, two-seat, gull wing monoplane, only one was built and the programme was abandoned as obsolete.

== Design and development ==
The ANF Les Mureaux 180C.2 first flew on 10 February 1935 with a 690 hp (515 kW) Hispano-Suiza 12Xbrs engine and a single fin and rudder. In April 1935 the 180 was modified with a Hispano-Suiza 12Xcrs motor-canon engine, it had 20mm cannon that fired through the propeller hub. The aircraft was also fitted with two wing-mounted 7.5mm machine guns. The observer also had a machine gun mounted on a flexible mount and the tail unit was changed to two vertical surfaces. It continued to be tested until April 1936 but the project was abandoned when the design was considered to be obsolete.

== Specifications ==
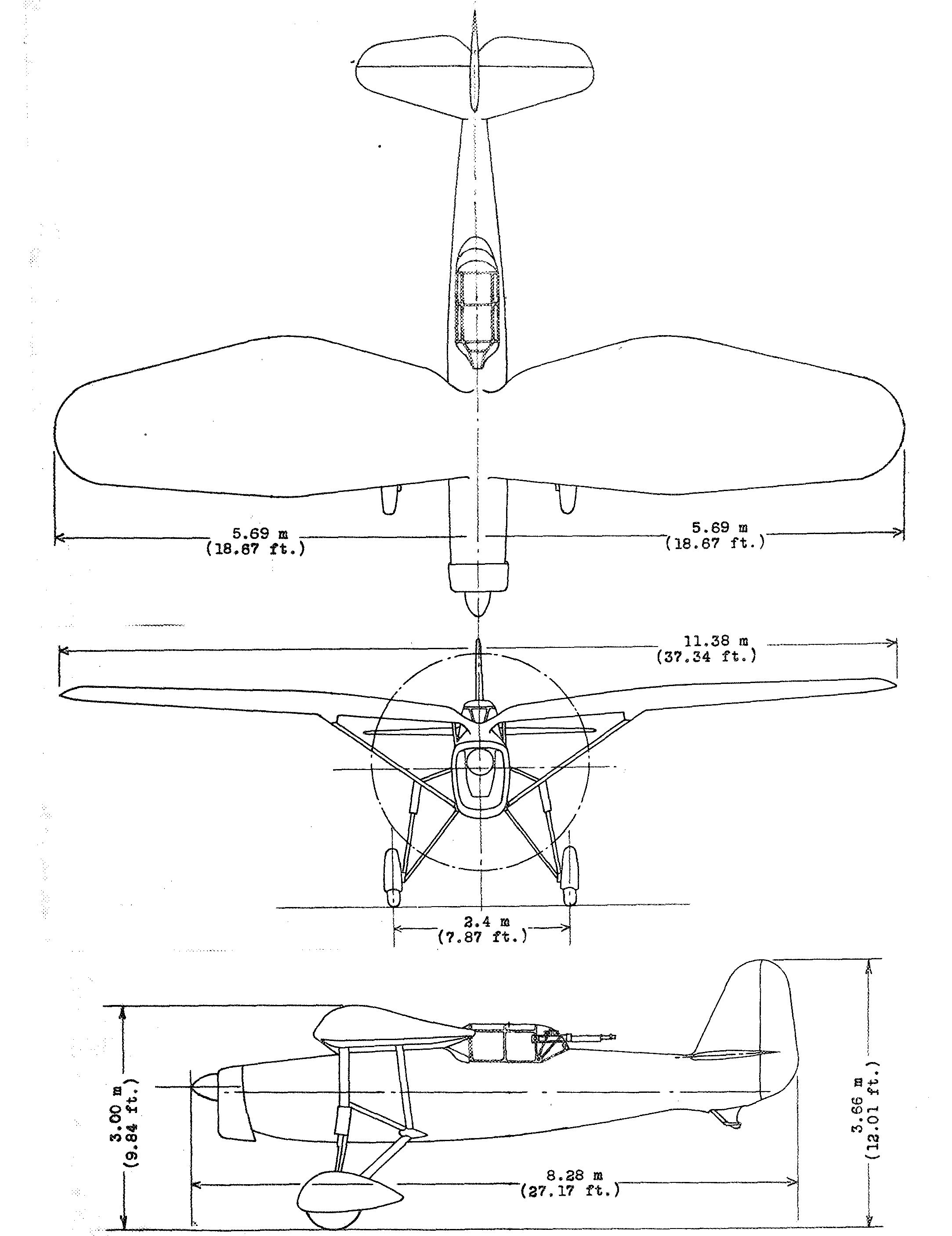
Mureaux 180 3-view drawing from NACA-SR-26

Data from

General characteristics

- Crew: 2 (pilot, observer)
- Length: 7.83 m (25 ft 8 in)
- Wingspan: 11.38 m (37 ft 4 in)
- Height: 3.26 m (10 ft 8 in)
- Wing area: 19.56 m^{2} (210.5 sq ft)
- Empty weight: 1,266 kg (2,791 lb)
- Gross weight: 1,953 kg (4,306 lb)
- Powerplant: 1 × Hispano-Suiza 12Xcrs liquid-cooled V-12 engine, 510 kW (690 hp)

Performance

- Maximum speed: 379 km/h (235 mph, 205 kn)
- Range: 750 km (470 mi, 400 nmi)

Armament

- Guns:
- 2 × 7.7 mm (0.303 in) wing-mounted machine guns
- 1 × 7.7 mm (0.303 in) machine gun on a flexible mount in the rear cockpit.
- 1 × 20 mm (0.787 in) cannon firing through the propeller hub.

== See also ==
Related development

- ANF Les Mureaux 170
