= Chelyabinsk Tractor Plant =

Heavy industry plant in Chelyabinsk, Russia

Coordinates: 55°09′20″N 61°28′24″E

- Native name: Челябинский тракторный завод
- Industry: Engineering, industrial vehicle production, defense industry
- Founded: 1 June 1933
- Headquarters: Chelyabinsk, CHE, Russia
- Products: Tractors, bulldozers, diesel engines, armored vehicles other
- Services: Casting and forging, research and development, physical and chemical testing, diesel engine certification, other
- Revenue: 124,700,000 United States dollar (1994)
- Number of employees: >20,000 (2009); 13,000 (2011)
- Parent: Uralvagonzavod
- Subsidiaries: Machine building plant 'Vityaz'
- Website: chtz-uraltrac.ru

Chelyabinsk Tractor Plant (Russian: Челябинский тракторный завод, romanized: Chelyabinskiy traktornyy zavod, abbreviated ЧТЗ, ChTZ) also known as CTZ-Uraltrak (ЧТЗ-УРАЛТРАК) is a tractor construction plant in the Russian city of Chelyabinsk.

== History ==
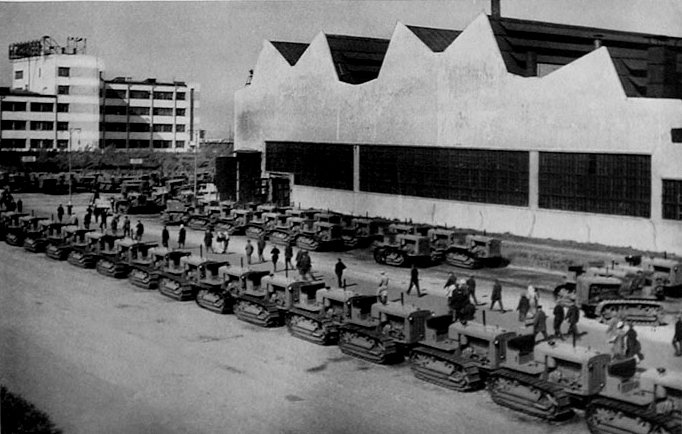
ChTZ in the 1930s

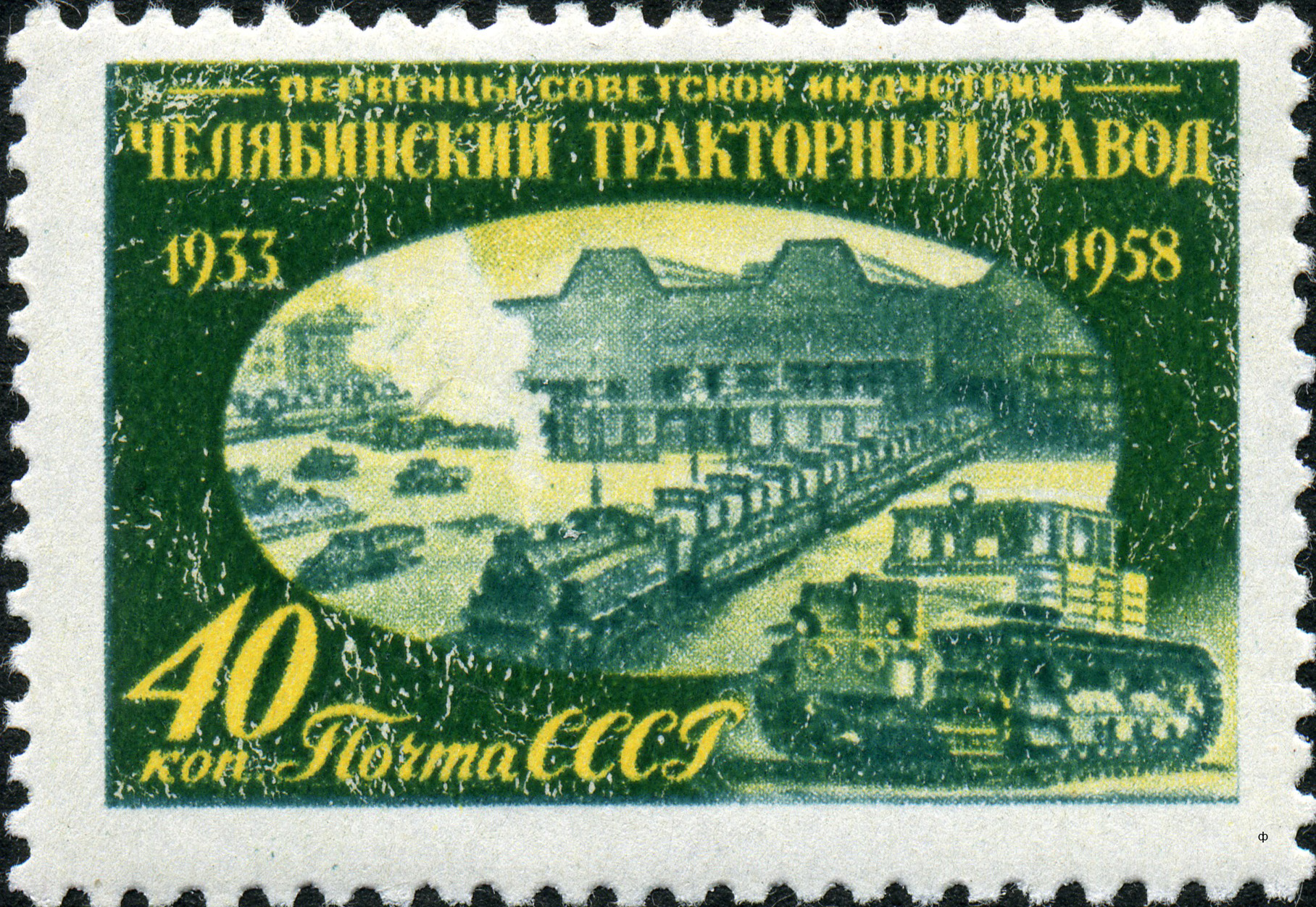
1958 USSR Postage stamp, Firstborn of the Soviet industry

The Chelyabinsk Tractor plant was a project of the first five-year plan. The plant was founded in 1933; the first product was a 60 hp tracked tractor C-60 (Сталинец-60, Stalinets-60) fueled by petroleum ether (Benzine). In 1937 the factory produced its first diesel-powered vehicle C-65 (Сталинец-65, Stalinets-65). By 1940 the plant had produced 100,000 tractors.

During World War II seven other industrial entities (including most of Leningrad's Kirov Plant and 15,000 of its workers) were either wholly or partially relocated to Chelyabinsk, the resulting enterprise commonly known as "Танкоград" ('Tankograd', or 'Tank City'). (Note: The collective tank works has been described in english language sources as being named either "Kirovskiy works No.100", or "Chelyabinsk Heavy Machine Plant No. 100" (ChZTM).) The work force increased to 60,000 workers by 1944, from 25,000 during non-military production; during the conflict the works produced 18,000 tanks, and 48,500 tank diesel engines as well as over 17 million units of ammunition. Production included the KV tank from 1941, T-34 tank from 1942, KV-85 tank and IS tanks from 1943, and T-34/85 tank and SU-85 self-propelled field gun from 1944 By 1945 the plant had been awarded the Order of Kutuzov, 1st Class, the Order of Lenin, the Order of the Red Star, and other honours for its efforts in helping to defeat Nazi Germany.

Post World War II conventional tractor production resumed with the С-80 (Сталинец-80, Stalinets-80) entering serial production in 1946. The plant reverted to its original name of Chelyabinsk Tractor factory in 1958. In 1961 a tractor with diesel electric transmission entered production: DET-250 (ДЭТ-250). The millionth tractor from CTZ was produced in 1984.

In 1990 a tractor with a hydromechanical transmission system entered production (T-10).

In 2008 the company acquired 100% of amphibious tracked machine building company "Vityaz" (Витязь); both are now part of the Uralvagonzavod holding group which Uraltrak established in association with other companies.

By 8 May 2022, due to sanctions imposed after the 2022 Russian invasion of Ukraine, United States officials claimed that Chelyabinsk Tractor Plant's tank production had halted, had been made “idle,” due to a lack of imported parts. However the factory claims to have fulfilled an order for an unspecified number of diesel engines in December 2022.

In 2023, the factory itself was sanctioned by the United States and Ukraine due to its supply of engines to Russian troops for military equipment. On 26 November 2023, an explosion occurred at the plant, causing a "severe fire".

== Operations and products ==
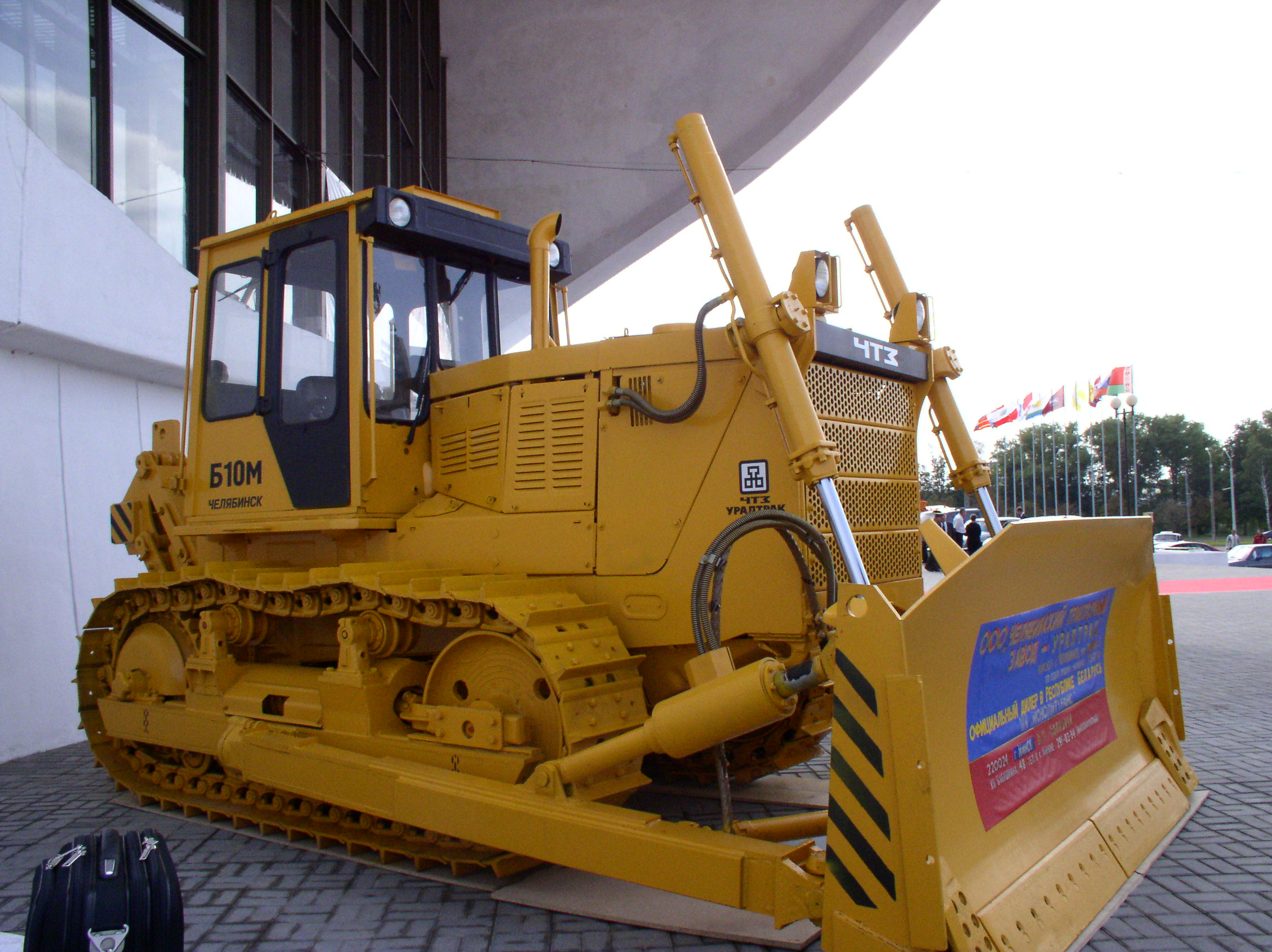
Bulldozer B10M (2004)

The organisation includes foundry and forging facilities, metal engineering facilities (CNC, lathes, heat treatment) as well as construction and assembly workshops.

As of 2011, Chelyabinsk Tractor Plant produces wheeled and tracked tractors and related modified vehicles, and related parts, as well as tractor engines up to ~1,000 hp (750 kW) and tank engines up to 1,500 hp (1,100 kW) like the T-14's 12N360.

Since 2010 the company has manufactured fork lifts under license from Bulgarian company Balkancar Record,

The company also produces road tanker vehicles, semi-trailers and pipe installation road vehicles.

== Subsidiaries ==
Since 2008 Machine engineering company 'Vityaz' (Машиностроительная компания "Витязь") has been a subsidiary of CTZ-Uraltrak. The company produces the Vityaz line of tracked all-terrain vehicles with amphibious capabilities.

== Historical products ==
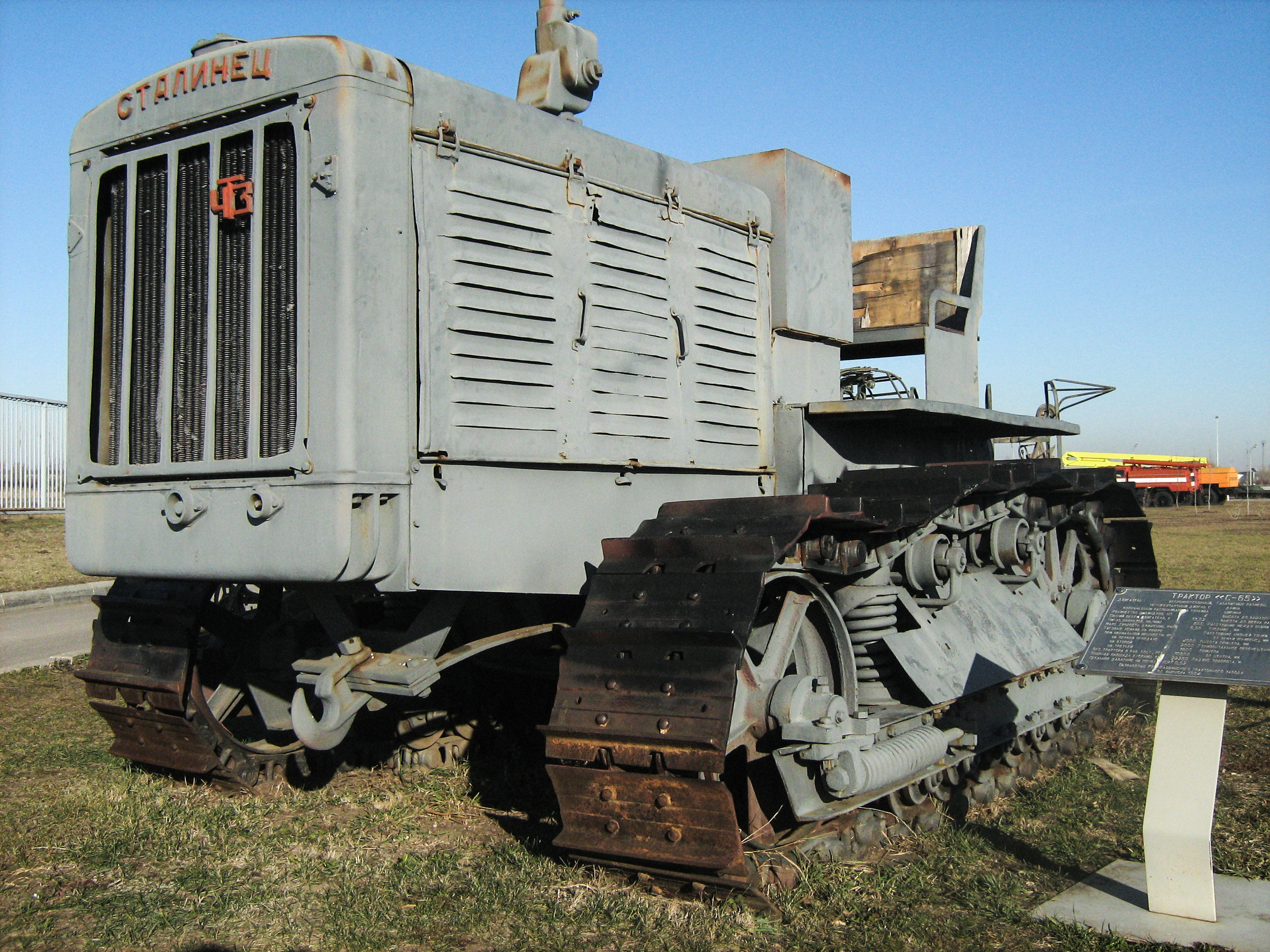
S-65 tractor

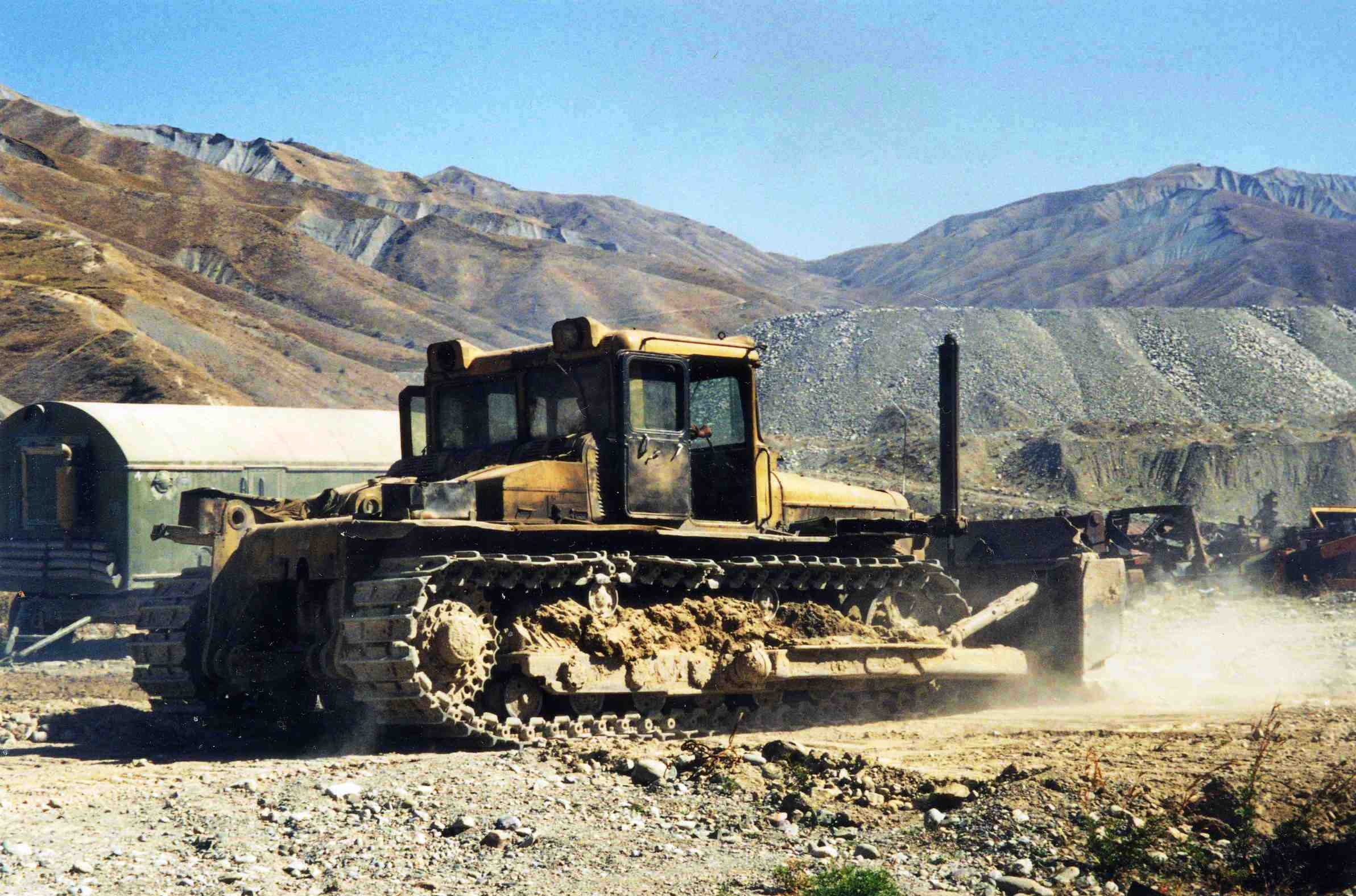
Bulldozer DET-250

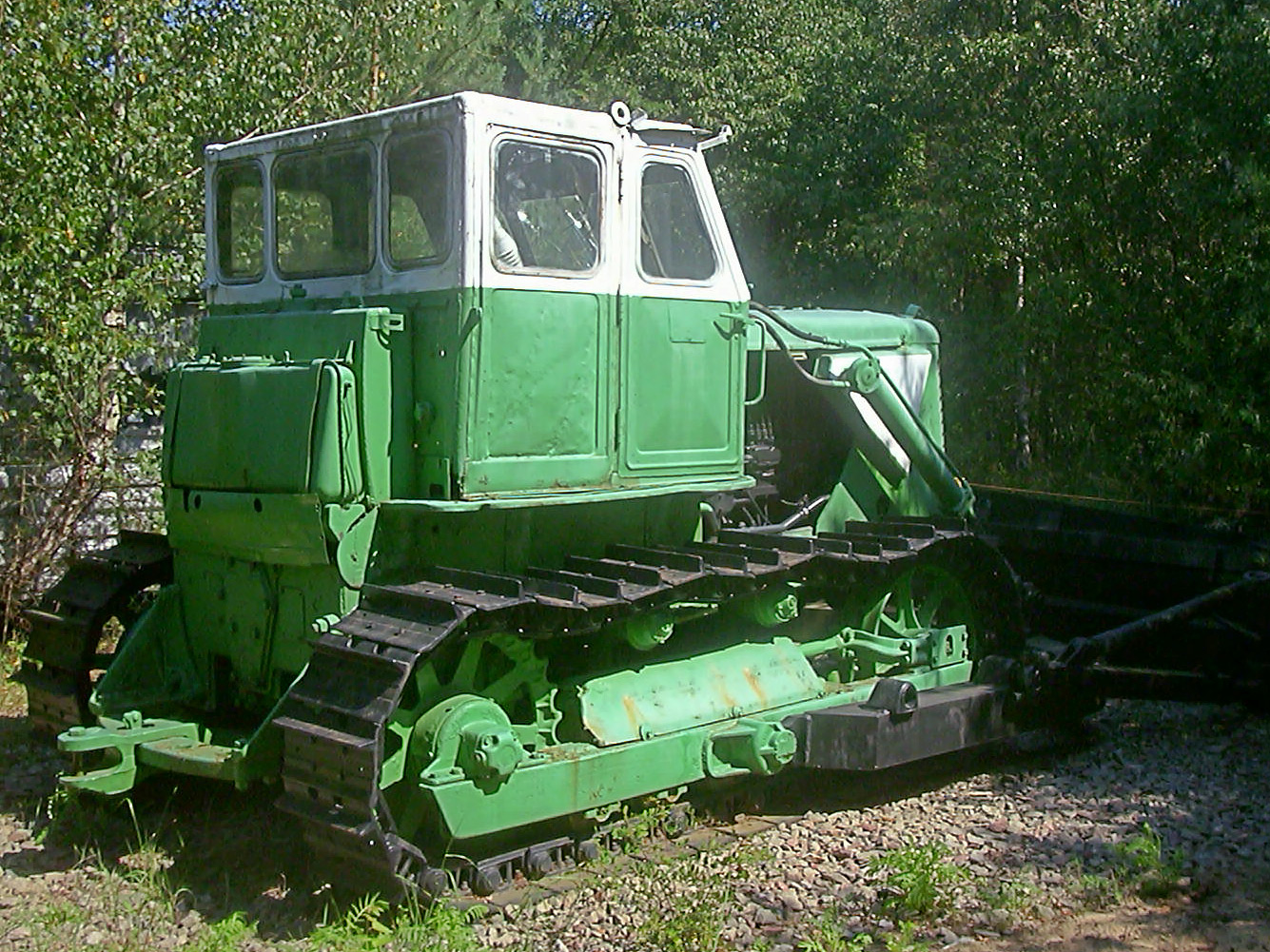
Tractor T-100MGP

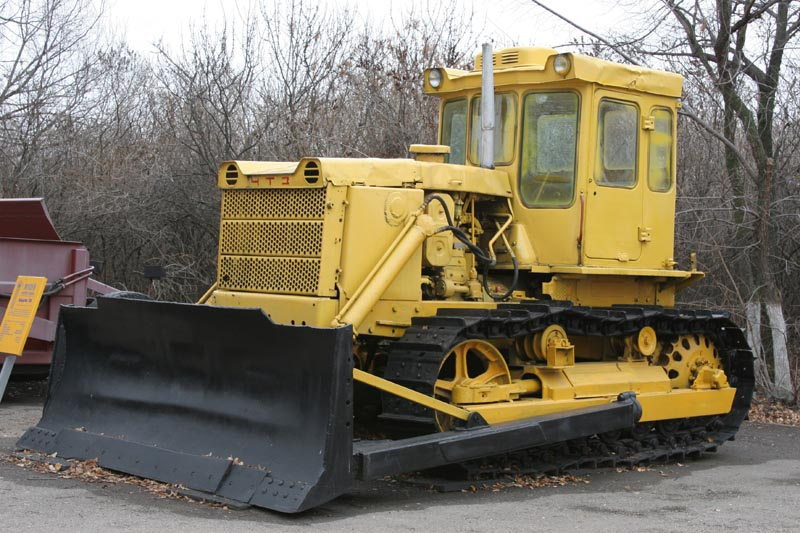
T-130 tractor

== See also ==
- Stalinets-60 – copy of Caterpillar Sixty
- S-65 Stalinets
- Omsktransmash – Russian wheeled tractor manufacturer
- Traktor Chelyabinsk – ice hockey team
- Soviet tank factories
