= Fujifilm FinePix T-series =

The Fujifilm FinePix T-series is a range of compact digital cameras comprising models featuring a wide zoom range. All the models in the T-series feature a 10x optical zoom lens, and with digital zoom its zooming level becomes 67x, which offers the 35 mm equivalent focal length of a 28-280mm zoom FUJINON LENS. Additional functions include Scene Recognition Auto and high-definition video. It supports SDHC memory cards.

== Models ==
- FinePix T200

== See also ==
- Fujifilm FinePix
- Fujifilm cameras
- Fujifilm
- Olympus VR-310
- Pentax Optio
