= ANF Les Mureaux 160T =

1932 design French touring monoplane

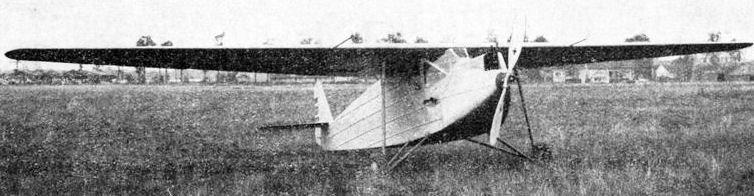

General information
- Type: Touring monoplane
- National origin: France
- Manufacturer: ANF Les Mureaux
- Number built: 1

History
- First flight: October 1932

The ANF Les Mureaux 160T was a French touring monoplane aircraft developed in the early 1930s and flown for the first time in October 1932, designed by the ANF Les Mureaux. It was a two-seat high-wing monoplane powered by a 95 hp (71 kW) Renault 4Pb inline engine, it did not enter production.

Despite its advanced design for such a civilian-adjacent aircraft, the Mureaux 160T was not without its issues. Its engines were known to be underpowered, and it was considered to be somewhat slow and difficult to handle in flight. The flight characteristics of the aircraft turned out to be quite good, but its cost failed - there were no buyers for such a "suburban" aircraft. Only one was produced, and as a result, it was gradually phased out of service in the late 1930s, and it was largely replaced by more advanced aircraft.

== Specification ==
Data from Les Ailes, October 1932

General characteristics

- Crew: one
- Capacity: one passenger
- Length: 8.05 m (26 ft 5 in)
- Wingspan: 13.60 m (44 ft 7 in)
- Height: 2.25 m (7 ft 5 in)
- Wing area: 17 m^{2} (180 sq ft)
- Aspect ratio: 11
- Empty weight: 480 kg (1,058 lb)
- Gross weight: 820 kg (1,808 lb)
- Powerplant: 1 × Renault 4Pb 4-cylinder inline, 71 kW (95 hp)
- Propellers: 2-bladed

Performance

- Maximum speed: 205 km/h (127 mph, 111 kn) at ground level
- Range: 550 km (340 mi, 300 nmi) into 50 km/h (31 mph; 27 kn) headwind
- Service ceiling: 7,200 m (23,600 ft)
- Time to altitude: 12 min to 3,000 m (9,800 ft)
