= Blériot-SPAD S.70 =

1920s French fighter aircraft

S.70

General information
- Type: Fighter
- Manufacturer: Blériot
- Designer: André Herbemont
- Primary user: Aéronautique Militaire
- Number built: 1

History
- First flight: 20 April 1927

The Blériot-SPAD S.70 was a French fighter aircraft developed in the late 1920s.

== Design and development ==
The S.70 was the second prototype of the S.60, being a two-seat biplane fighter of all-wood construction with a canvas coating and a monocoque fuselage.

== Specifications ==
Data from

General characteristics

- Crew: 1
- Length: 7.5 m (24 ft 7 in)
- Wingspan: 11.3 m (37 ft 1 in)
- Wing area: 36.6 m^{2} (394 sq ft)
- Empty weight: 1,331 kg (2,934 lb)
- Gross weight: 1,893 kg (4,173 lb)
- Powerplant: 1 × Lorraine 12Ed 'Courlis' W-12 water-cooled piston engine, 340 kW (450 hp)
- Propellers: 2-bladed fixed-pitch propeller

Performance

- Maximum speed: 210 km/h (130 mph, 110 kn)

== See also ==
Related development

- S.60
