= Caterpillar Sixty =

American tracked tractor produced 1925-1931

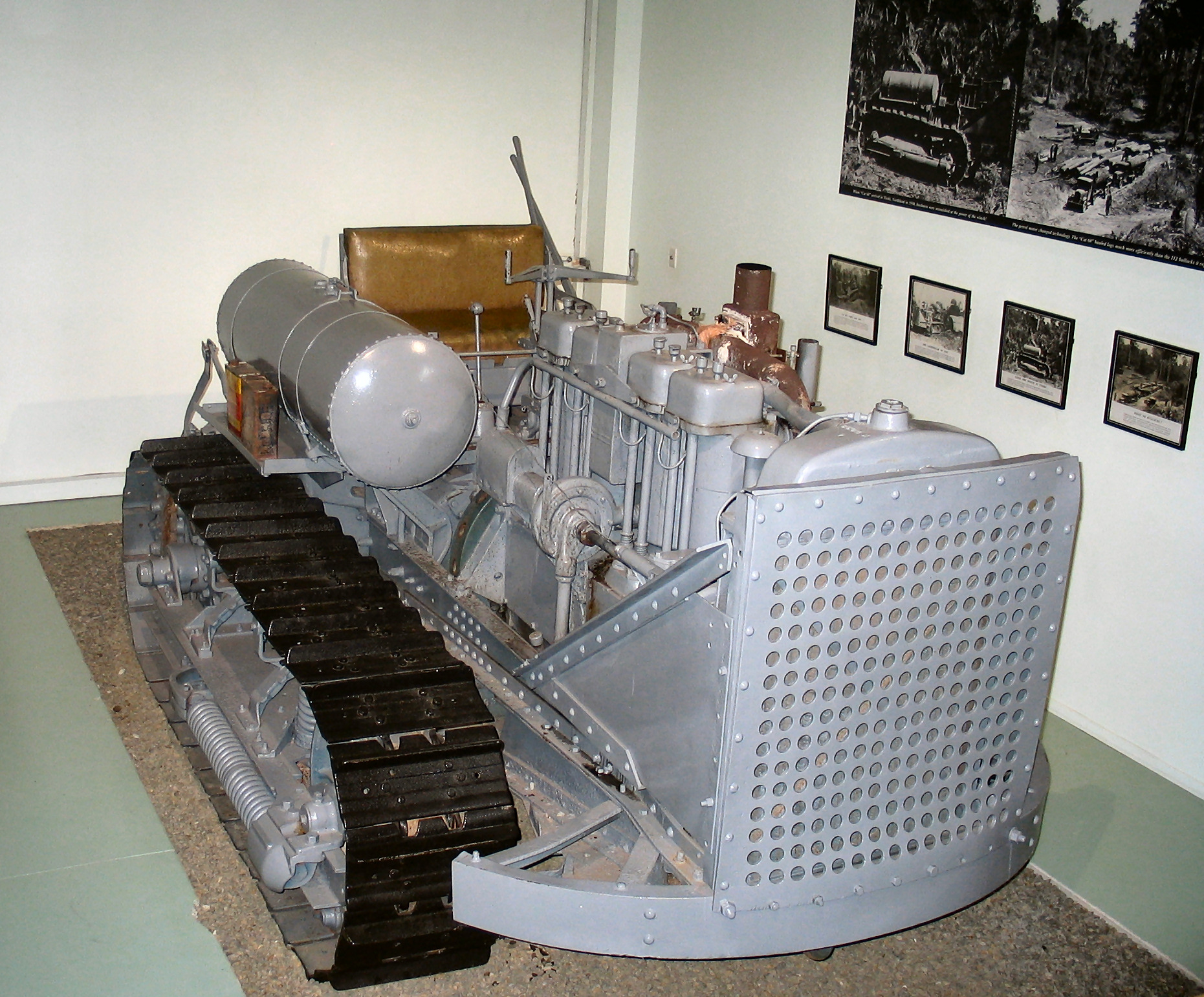
1929 Caterpillar Sixty on display in the Kauri Museum, Matakohe, Northland, New Zealand.

The Caterpillar Sixty is a 60 horsepower (45 kW) crawler tractor manufactured by the Caterpillar Tractor Company from 1925 until 1931. The Sixty was the largest tractor in Caterpillar's product line at that time.

The Caterpillar Sixty was originally introduced for sale beginning in 1919 as the C. L. Best 60 Tracklayer, manufactured by the C. L. Best Tractor Company. The Best 60 was the most successful tractor in the Best model line. After the 1925 merger of the C. L. Best Tractor Company and the Holt Manufacturing Company, that formed the Caterpillar Tractor Company, the Best 60 was renamed the Caterpillar Sixty.

Between 1919 and 1931, 18,948 C. L. Best 60 Tracklayer/Caterpillar Sixty tractors were manufactured.

== Specifications ==
The Caterpillar Sixty was powered by a four-cylinder, overhead valve gasoline engine that produced 60 horsepower (45 kW) at the belt and 35 horsepower (26 kW) at the drawbar. The Sixty was a 72-inch (1.8 m) gauge machine and weighed 20,500 pounds (9,300 kg).

== Numbers produced ==
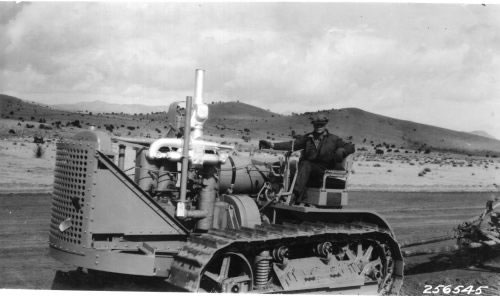
A new Caterpillar Sixty being used for road work in the Cibola National Forest, New Mexico, United States in 1931

Caterpillar produced model Sixty tractors in San Leandro, California through 1930 and in Peoria, Illinois through 1931. In total, 18,948 C. L. Best 60 Tracklayer/Caterpillar Sixty tractors were manufactured during twelve years of production.

== See also ==
- G-numbers, G022 army ordnance tractor.
- Chelyabinsk Tractor Plant, manufactured copy of Caterpillar Sixty as Stalinets-60
