= Pentax Optio H90 =

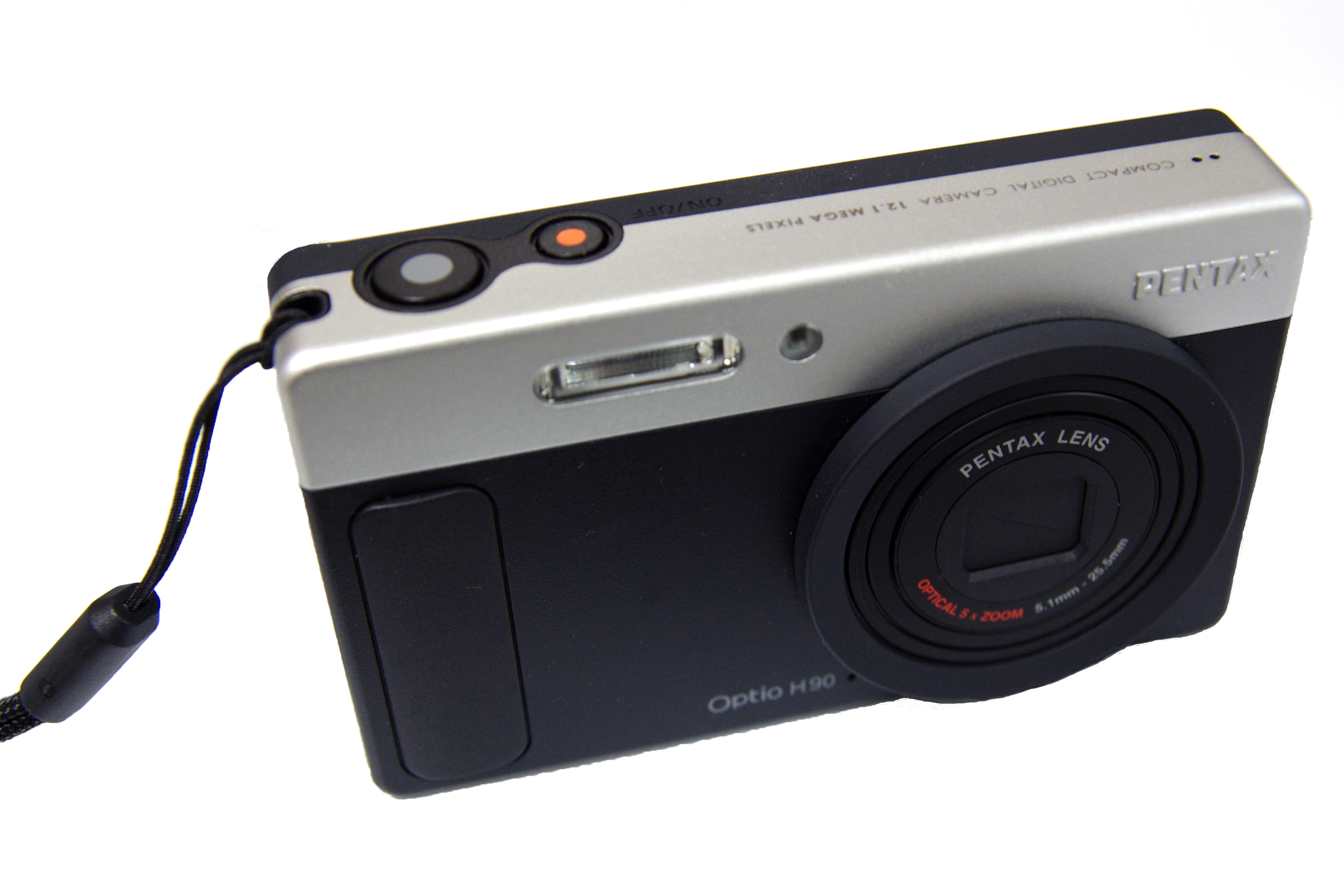

Overview
- Maker: Pentax

Lens
- Lens: 28-140mm equivalent
- F-numbers: f/3.5-f/5.9 at the widest

Sensor/medium
- Sensor type: CCD
- Sensor size: 6.17 x 4.55mm (1/2.3 inch type)
- Maximum resolution: 4000 x 3000 (12 megapixels)
- Recording medium: SD or SDHC memory card; internal memory

Focusing
- Focus areas: 9 focus points

Shutter
- Shutter speeds: 1/2000s to 4s
- Continuous shooting: 1 frame per second

Image processing
- Image processor: Prime
- White balance: Yes

General
- LCD screen: 2.7 inches with 230,000 dots
- Dimensions: 101 x 65 x 28mm (3.98 x 2.56 x 1.1 inches)
- Weight: 153 g (5 oz) including battery

The Pentax Optio H90 is a digital compact camera announced by Pentax on January 25, 2010. It was launched under a new "functional beauty" design paradigm and was described as exhibiting "pleasant minimalism". It is compatible with Eye-Fi wireless SD cards and supports 720p video.
