= Les Mureaux 3 =

1920s French fighter aircraft

Les Mureaux 3 C.2

General information
- Type: two seat fighter aircraft
- National origin: France
- Manufacturer: Ateliers Les Mureaux
- Designer: André Brunet

History
- First flight: Spring 1927

The Les Mureaux 3 C.2 and Les Mureaux 4 C.2 were French two seat, parasol winged fighters, flown in 1927-8, which differed only in their engines. They were developed into near identical army co-operation types, the ANF Les Mureaux 130 A.2 and ANF Les Mureaux 131 A.2, in 1929–31.

== Design ==
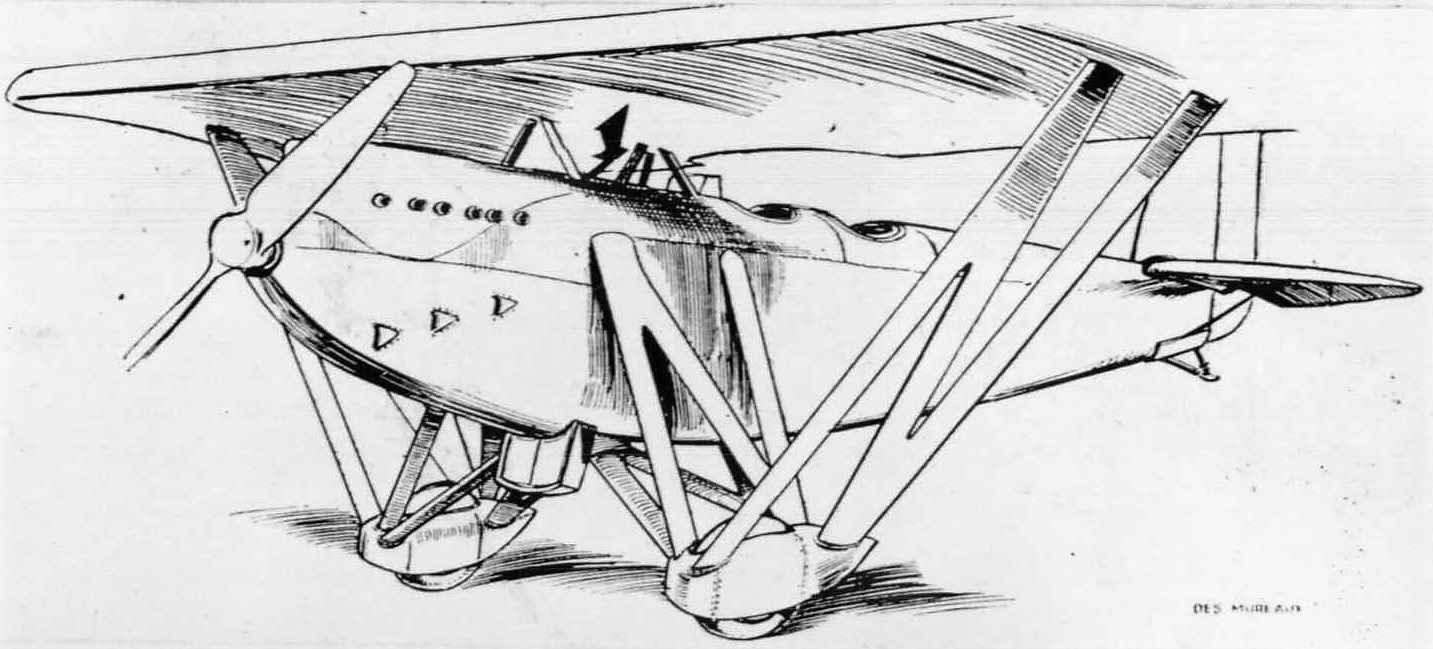
Les Mureaux 3 C.2 perspective drawing from NACA Aircraft Circular No.42

The Les Mureaux 3 C.2 (with C.2 the standard French military designation for a two-seat chasseur or fighter) was designed by André Brunet and his name is often combined with the manufacturer's in the aircraft name. It had an almost entirely duralumin structure and the forward fuselage was also dural covered. The wings and rear fuselage were fabric covered.

Its wing was built around two box spars with Warren girder ribs. The Mureaux was intended to operate at high altitudes, so the wing had a high aspect ratio for its time and used a thin wing section of Brunet's own design. In plan it was unswept, with constant chord, semi-circular tips and a rounded cut-out in the trailing edge over the forward cockpit. Ailerons occupied the whole of the trailing edge; they could be used differentially for roll control or together as camber changing flaps for landing.

The wing mounting was unusual, with airfoil section, N-form struts on each side connecting the wing spars not to the lower fuselage but instead to the frames that carried the independently rubber sprung undercarriage mainwheels. These frames, enclosed in streamlined fairings 2.50 m (8 ft 2 in) apart, were also braced the upper fuselage longerons with shorter N-struts and with inverted V-struts to the central fuselage underside. Short, inverted V-struts attached the wing centre section to the upper fuselage. There were no wing bracing wires.

The fuselage of the Mureaux was built around four duralumin tube longerons, with easily repaired connections to tubular diagonals and with removable panels covering the forward part. Two removable engine mountings allowed either a 440 kW (590 hp) Hispano-Suiza 12Hb V-12, a type often identified at the time as the V-12 500 hp (its officially approved power) Hispano-Suiza, or a water-cooled 370 kW (500 hp) Salmson 18 Cm radial engine to be fitted. Both engine types used an adjustable honeycomb radiator projecting from the fuselage underside and were fed fuel from a jettisonable tank behind the engine and ahead of the engine firewall. The Hispano version was designated the Les Mureaux 3 and the Salmson powered aircraft Les Mureaux 4, the latter 78 kg (172 lb) heavier.

The pilot's open cockpit was under the wing cut-out, with the gunner/observer, equipped with cameras, small bombs and guns, separately behind him. The tail unit was conventional, with a flight-adjustable tailplane mounted on top of the fuselage and braced from below with a single strut on each side. Both it and the fin had straight leading edges which led to rounded tips. Both rudder and elevators were unbalanced; the rudder was rounded and extended to the keel, operating in a notch between the elevators. On the fuselage underside below the tail was a rubber sprung, steel and dural tailskid with a steerable shoe.

== Development ==
The exact date of the Les Mureaux 3 C.2's first flight is not known; it appeared at the Paris Aero Show in December 1926 but did not fly before the following March, though by then it was almost ready. It had certainly been flown before the end of June 1927, when it was being tested at Villacoublay. The Salmson-engined Les Mureaux 4 C2 was on display at the 1928 Paris Show.

Between the 11th and 12th Paris Aero Shows (July 1928 and December 1930) Ateliers Les Mureaux became known as ANF Les Mureaux when they amalgamated with Ateliers de Construction du Nord de la France. They also changed their type designations into three digit numbers. By mid-1931 they had introduced two observation aircraft, almost identical to each other apart from their engines and very similar to the types 3 and 4, designated ANF Les Mureaux 130 A2 and ANF Les Mureaux 131 A2. The types 3 and 130 had the same engine but the type 131 was fitted with a 500 hp (370 kW) Renault 12 Jc water-cooled V-12 engine, which made it slightly longer, heavier and slower than the type 130. Both were heavier than the types 3 and 4 when fully equipped. The Type 130 had a top speed at sea level of 232 km/h (144 mph) and could reach 5,000 m (16,000 ft) in 21 minutes. Externally the types 130 and 131 differed most in the covering of their wings; the 130's was entirely fabric covered, whereas that of the 131 was duralumin covered on the upper surface with fabric on the lower. This mixture made the 131 better suited to outside storage whilst allowing easy assessment of internal wing damage. The type 130 was first reported in November 1929 but the type 131 did not fly until the first half of 1931.

== Variants ==
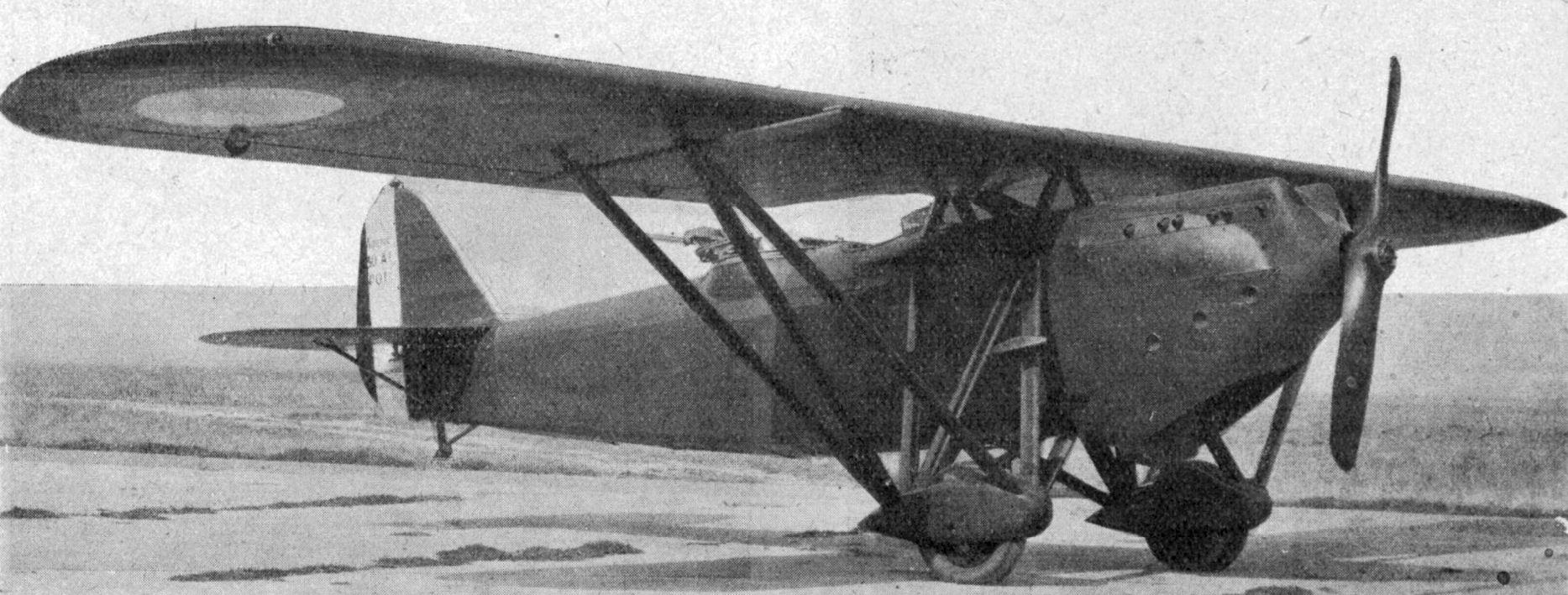
ANF Les Mureaux 130 photo from L'Aérophile November,1929

Les Mureaux 3 C.2
Hispano-Suiza 12Hb engine, fighter
Les Mureaux 4 C.2
Salmson 18 Cm engine, fighter
ANF Les Mureaux 130 A.2
Hispano-Suiza 12Hb engine, reconnaissance
ANF Les Mureaux 131 A.2
Renault 12 Jc engine, reconnaissance

== Specifications (Les Mureaux 3 C.2) ==
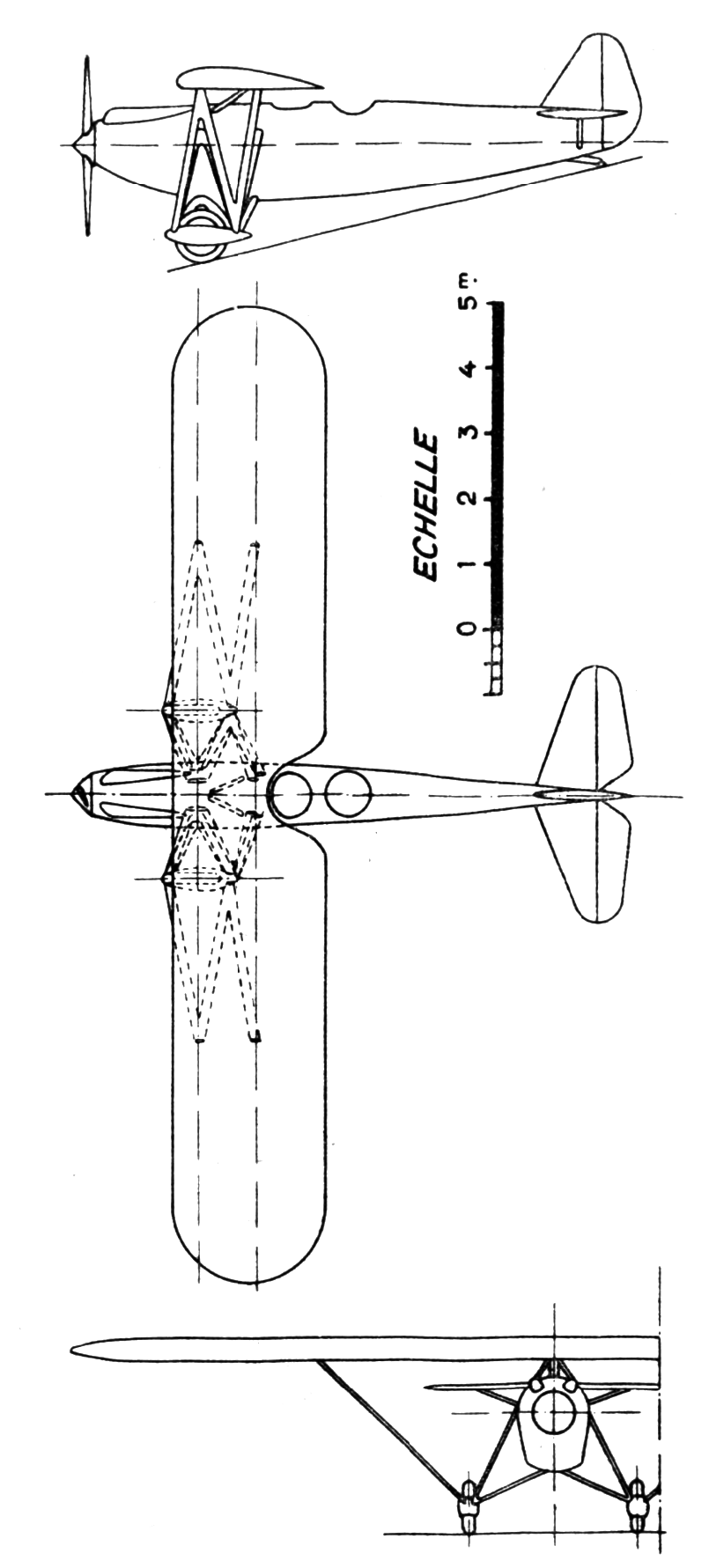
ANF Les Mureaux 130 3-view drawing from L'Aérophile November,1929

Data from Jane's all the World's Aircraft 1928, NACA aircraft circulars no.42 (1927)

General characteristics

- Crew: two
- Length: 8.45 m (27 ft 9 in)
- Wingspan: 15.00 m (49 ft 3 in)
- Height: 3.10 m (10 ft 2 in)
- Wing area: 32.5 m^{2} (350 sq ft)
- Aspect ratio: 6.9
- Empty weight: 1,160 kg (2,557 lb)
- Gross weight: 1,980 kg (4,365 lb)
- Fuel capacity: 300 kg (660 lb)
- Powerplant: 1 × Hispano-Suiza 12Hb water-cooled V-12, 440 kW (590 hp)
- Propellers: 2-bladed fixed pitch propeller

Performance

- Maximum speed: 268 km/h (167 mph, 145 kn) at sea level, 231 km/h (144 mph) at 5,000 m (16,400 ft)
- Stall speed: 102 km/h (63 mph, 55 kn)
- Service ceiling: 8,600 m (28,200 ft)
- Time to altitude: 25 min 16 s to 6,000 m (20,000 ft)
- Wing loading: 61.2 kg/m^{2} (12.5 lb/sq ft)
- Power/mass: 0.1868 kW/kg (0.1136 hp/lb)

Armament

- Guns: 2x fixed forward firing 7.7 mm (0.303 in) Vickers machine-guns; 2x flexibly mounted 7.7 mm (0.303 in) Lewis machine-guns in the rear cockpit

== Bibliography ==
- Lemaire, Jean-Bernard (February 2002). "Courrier des Lecteurs" [Readers' Letters]. Avions: Toute l'Aéronautique et son histoire (in French) (107): 3. ISSN 1243-8650.
