= Pentax Optio E60 =

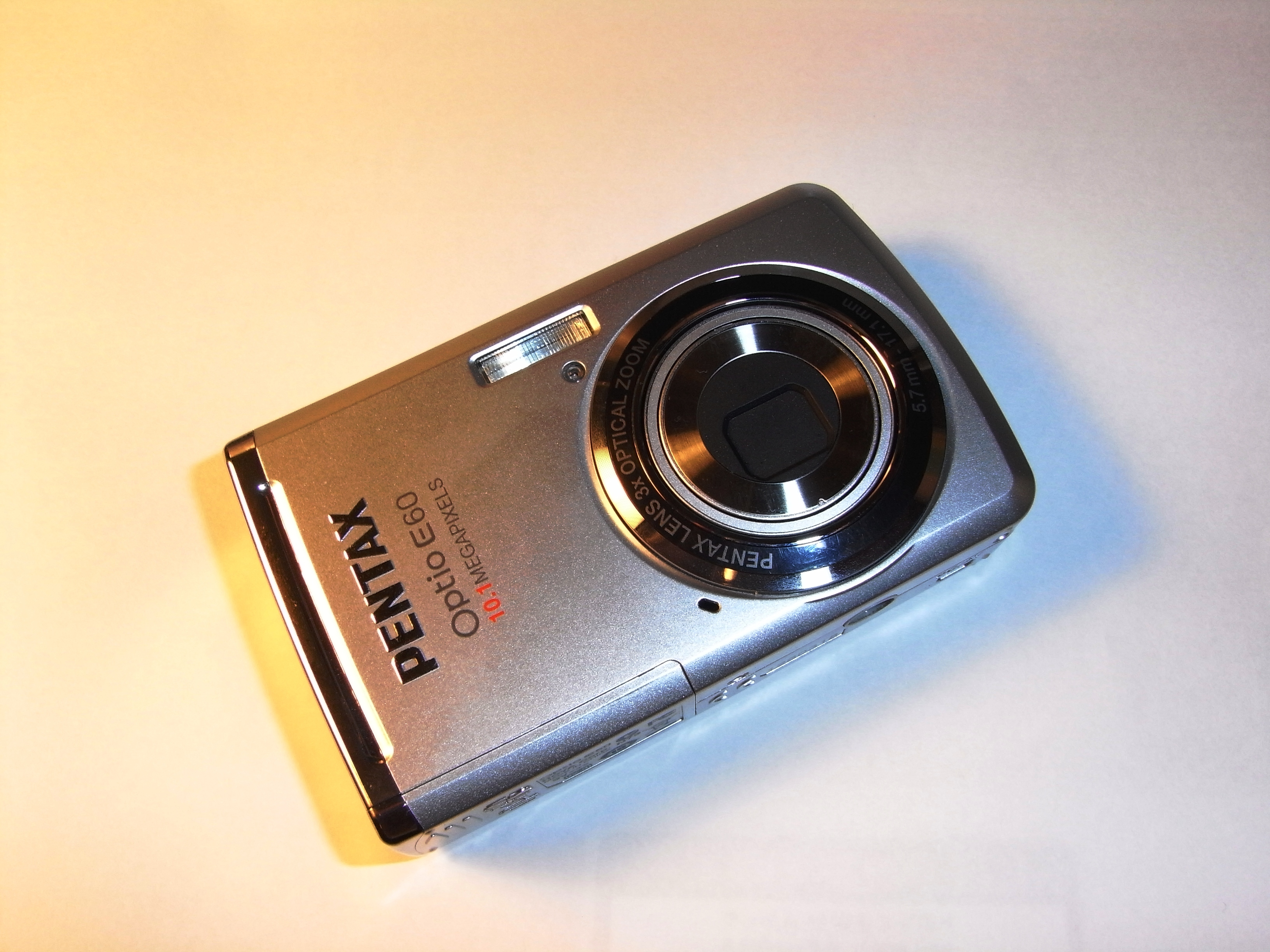

Overview
- Maker: Pentax

Lens
- Lens: 32-96mm equivalent
- F-numbers: f/2.9-f/5.2 at the widest

Sensor/medium
- Sensor type: CCD
- Sensor size: 6.08 x 4.56mm (1/2.33 inch type)
- Maximum resolution: 3648 x 2736 (10 megapixels)
- Recording medium: MMC, SD or SDHC card; internal memory

Focusing
- Focus areas: 3 focus points

Shutter
- Shutter speeds: 1/2000s to 4s

General
- LCD screen: 2.4 inches with 112,000 dots
- Dimensions: 98 x 59 x 25mm (3.86 x 2.32 x 0.98 inches)
- Weight: 175 g (6 oz) including battery

The Pentax Optio E60 is a digital compact camera announced by Pentax on July 31, 2008. It uses AA batteries and therefore does not depend on a proprietary charger.
