= ANF Les Mureaux 190 =

French fighter aircraft

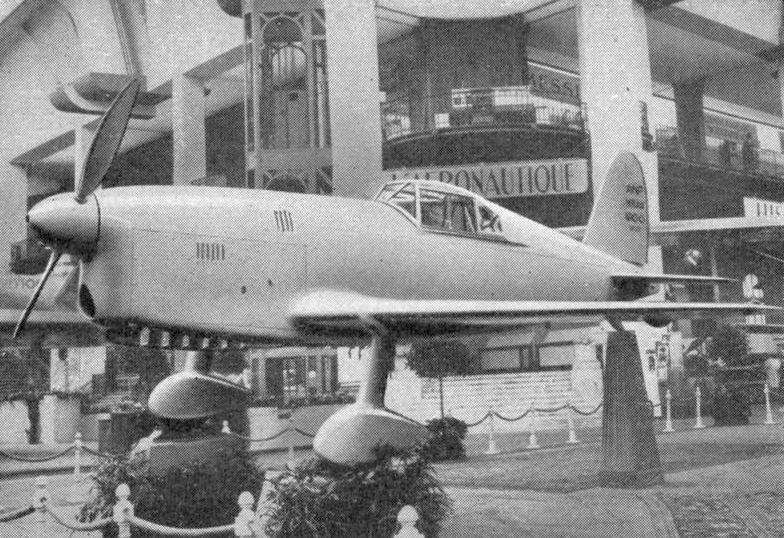

General information
- Type: Light fighter
- National origin: France
- Manufacturer: ANF Les Mureaux
- Number built: 1

History
- First flight: July 1936

The ANF Les Mureaux 190 was a French prototype light fighter aircraft. In response to a program created by the French Minister of Air, the ANF Les Mureaux 190 was designed by André Brunet as a light fighter. The ANF Les Mureaux 190 was an all-metal monoplane, and was first tested in July 1936, then taken to the 15th Paris Air Show in late November, where it was asserted to be very manoeuvrable. However, less than a year later, the project was abandoned due to the poor quality of its engine.

The ANF Les Mureax 190 was powered by a 450 hp Salmson 12 Vars inverted V-12 engine. its proposed armament consisted of a 20 mm (0.79 in) engine-mounted cannon, and two 7.7mm (.30-caliber) wing-mounted machine guns.

== Specifications ==
General characteristics

- Crew: 1
- Length: 7.2 m (23 ft 7 in)
- Wingspan: 8.38 m (27 ft 6 in)
- Height: 3 m (9 ft 10 in)
- Wing area: 10 m^{2} (110 sq ft)
- Empty weight: 850 kg (1,874 lb)
- Gross weight: 1,290 kg (2,844 lb)
- Powerplant: 1 × Salmson 12 Vars 12-cylinder inverted-V air-cooled, 340 kW (450 hp)

Performance

- Maximum speed: 500 km/h (310 mph, 270 kn)

Armament

- Guns: 1 × 20 mm cannon, 2 × 7.7 mm machine guns
