= S-60 (tractor) =

Soviet Tractor

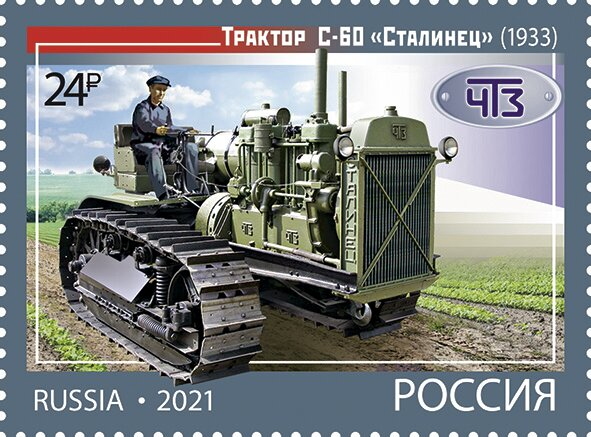
S-60 on a 2021 stamp of Russia

The S-60 or Stalinets-60 (Russian: Сталинец-60, romanized: Stalinets-60) was a Soviet tractor produced at the Chelyabinsk Tractor Plant between 1933 and 1937.

It was based on the American Caterpillar Sixty tractor and was mostly produced for the Red Army, which used them extensively to haul artillery, as the tractor was heavily built and had a powerful engine. The tractor was used extensively in the beginning of World War II, but was gradually replaced by the S-65 tractor powered by a diesel engine. Many were captured and used by the Wehrmacht.

The tractor was originally produced during the Second Five Year Plan (1933–37), produced for kolkhozes (Soviet collective farms). It was intended to serve as state-owned equipment for farmers who would otherwise be too poor to afford it.
