= ANF Les Mureaux =

Historical French aircraft manufacturer

- Industry: Aviation

ANF Les Mureaux (full name: Les Ateliers de Construction du Nord de la France et des Mureaux) was a French aircraft manufacturer founded in Les Mureaux in 1918 as Les Ateliers des Mureaux building aircraft under license. Significant products included Vickers Vimys and Breguet 14s during the 1920s. Under head designer André Brunet, it also produced a few original parasol-winged monoplanes that eventually led to the firm's greatest success, the 113 military reconnaissance aircraft of 1931 and its derivatives.

In 1928, it purchased French seaplane manufacturer Besson and in 1930 amalgamated with Ateliers de Construction du Nord de la France, a railway firm. In 1937, it was nationalized and made part of SNCAN.

== Aircraft built by Les Mureaux and ANF Les Mureaux. ==
Type	First flight	Number built	Role
Les Mureaux 1 C.1 Express-Marin	1924	1	Naval fighter
Les Mureaux 3 C.2	1927	1	Fighter
Les Mureaux 4 C.2	1928	1	Fighter
ANF Les Mureaux 110 Family	1931	285	Reconnaissance
ANF Les Mureaux 120	1931	2	Reconnaissance
ANF Les Mureaux 130	1929	1	Reconnaissance
ANF Les Mureaux 131	1931	1	Reconnaissance
ANF Les Mureaux 140	1932	1	Mail plane
ANF Les Mureaux 160	1932	1	General aviation touring
ANF Les Mureaux 170	1932	1	Fighter
ANF Les Mureaux 180	1935	1	Fighter
ANF Les Mureaux 190	1936	1	Fighter
ANF Les Mureaux 200	1936	1	Reconnaissance
