= Blériot-SPAD S.60 =

1920s French fighter aircraft

S.60
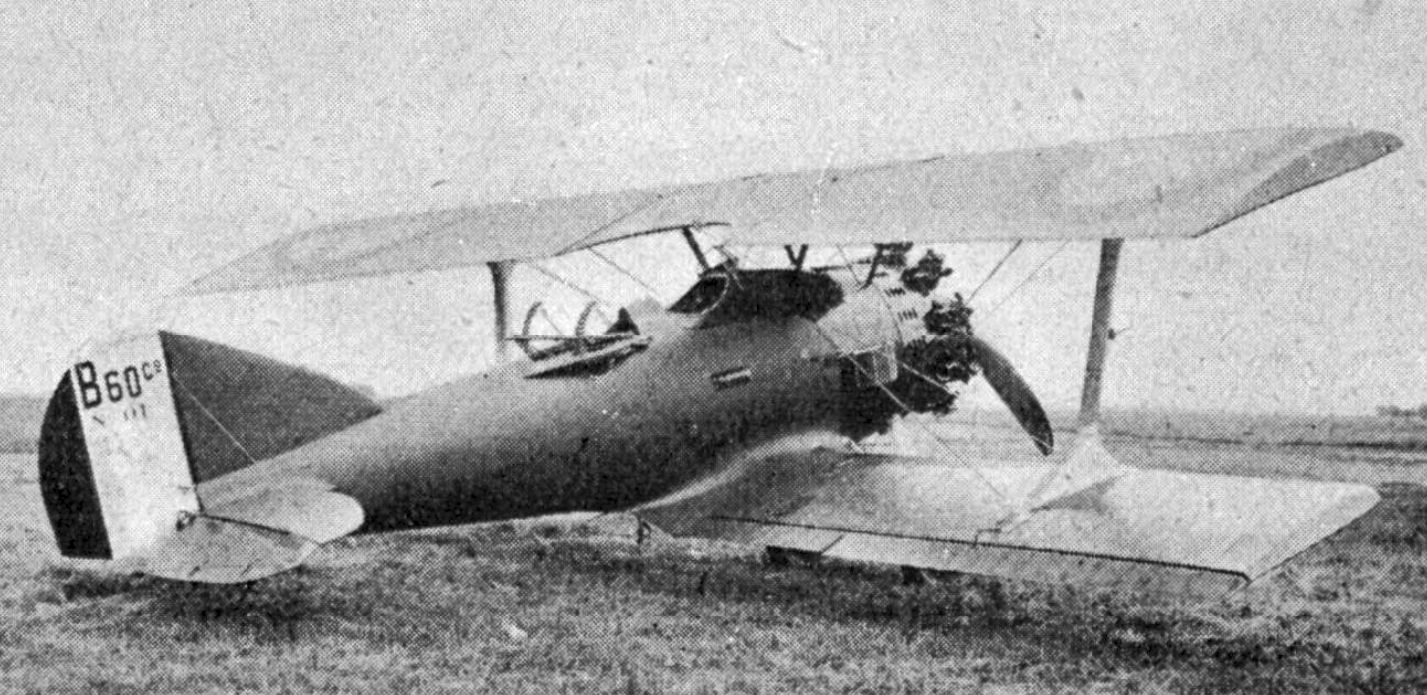

General information
- Type: Fighter
- Manufacturer: Blériot
- Designer: André Herbemont
- Primary user: Aéronautique Militaire
- Number built: 3

History
- First flight: 26 June 1926
- Variant: S.70

The Blériot-SPAD S.60 was a French fighter aircraft developed in the late 1920s.

== Design and development ==
The S.60 was a two-seat biplane fighter of all-wood construction with a canvas coating and a monocoque fuselage. The upper wing was backswept, while the lower wing was unswept. Three prototypes were ordered on December 24, 1925, and the first prototype flew on June 26, 1926, but stability problems meant that the S.60 was rejected for production in favor of the improved S.70.

== Specifications ==
Data from

General characteristics

- Crew: two
- Length: 6.88 m (22 ft 7 in)
- Wingspan: 11.30 m (37 ft 1 in)
- Height: 3.21 m (10 ft 6 in)
- Wing area: 36.60 m^{2} (394.0 sq ft)
- Empty weight: 1,224 kg (2,698 lb)
- Gross weight: 1,803 kg (3,975 lb)
- Powerplant: 1 × Gnome-Rhône Jupiter 9Ab 9-cylinder radial engine , 310 kW (420 hp)

Performance

- Maximum speed: 210 km/h (130 mph, 110 kn)
- Cruise speed: 185 km/h (115 mph, 100 kn)
- Service ceiling: 4,000 m (13,000 ft)
- Rate of climb: 4.3 m/s (850 ft/min)

Armament

- 4 × 7.7 mm machine guns

== See also ==
Related development

- S.70
