= Pentax Optio S50 =

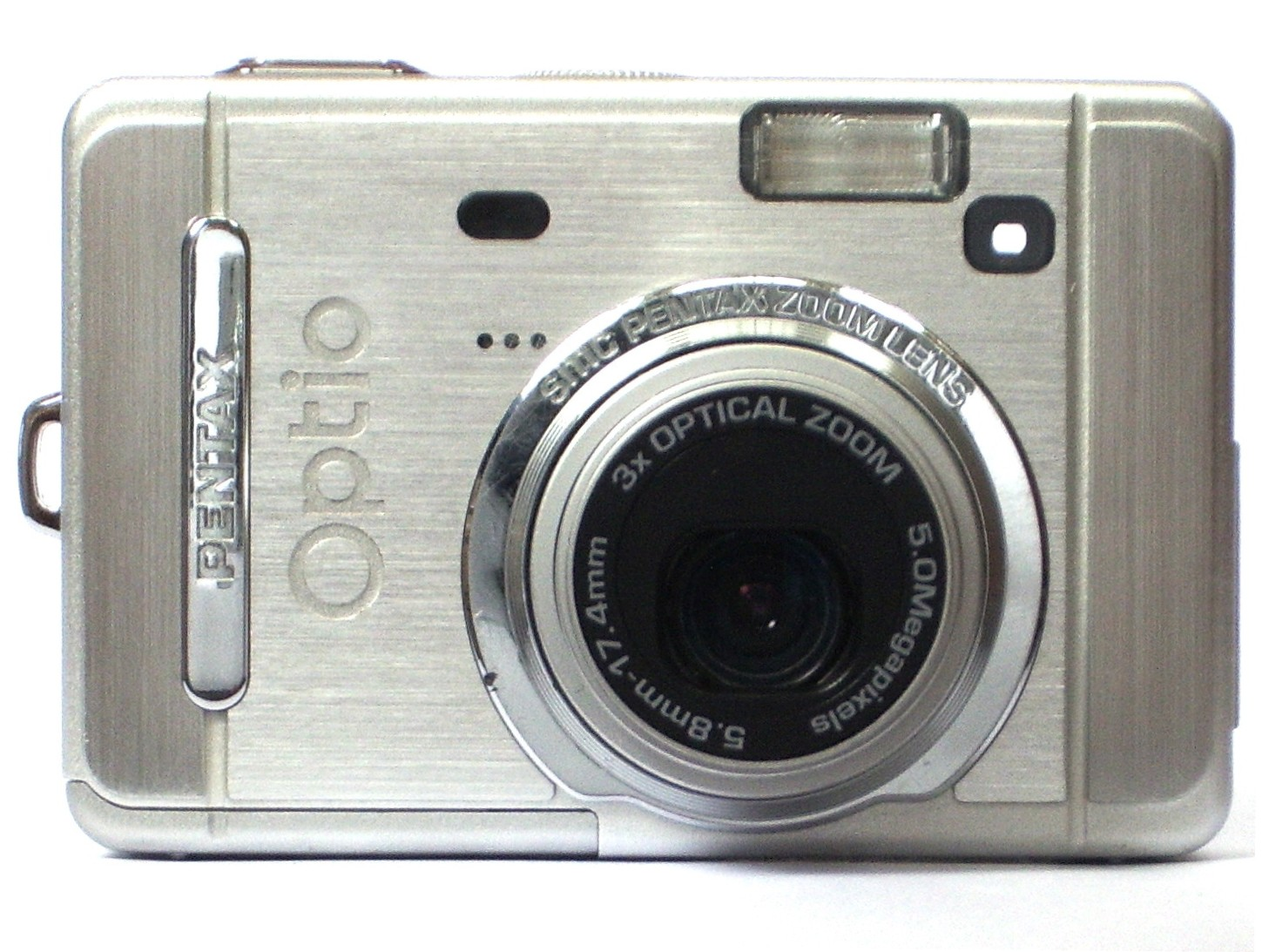

Overview
- Maker: Pentax

Lens
- Lens: 36-107mm equivalent
- F-numbers: f/2.6-f/4.8 at the widest

Sensor/medium
- Sensor type: CCD
- Sensor size: 5.744 x 4.308mm (1/2.5 inch type)
- Maximum resolution: 2560 x 1920 (5 megapixels)
- Recording medium: SD or MMC card; internal memory

Shutter
- Shutter speeds: 1/2000s to 4s

Image processing
- White balance: Yes

General
- LCD screen: 1.8 inches with 85,000 dots
- Dimensions: 89 x 59 x 26mm (3.5 x 2.32 x 1.02 inches)
- Weight: 180 g (6 oz) including battery

The Pentax Optio S50 is a digital compact camera announced by Pentax on August 16, 2004. It contains an early example of a selective colour filter.
