= Pierre Le Gloan =

French flying ace (1913–1943)

- Pierre le Gloan c. 1940
- Born: 6 January 1913; Kergrist-Moëlou, Côtes-d'Armor, France
- Died: 11 September 1943 (aged 30)
- Military career
- Allegiance: France
- Branch: French Air Force
- Service years: 1931–1943
- Conflicts: World War II

Pierre Le Gloan (6 January 1913 – 11 September 1943) was a French flying ace of World War II. Unique in the annals of wartime flying, he scored victories against German, Italian and British forces. Flying in the French and Vichy French air forces, his career has led some to call him the only pilot to become a flying ace on both sides of the war. He was killed in a landing accident in September 1943.

== Early years ==
Pierre Le Gloan was born on 6 January 1913 in Kergrist-Moëlou, Brittany, France. The commune in France where he lived has a street that bears his name. During his teen years, he won a civil aviation scholarship, funded by the French government, which gave him his first real taste of flying. Le Gloan applied to a civilian aviation school, intending to follow a career in aviation.

== Military career ==
At the age of 18, Le Gloan joined the French Air Force. At the outbreak of the war, as part of the air defence of Paris and the lower Seine, he served in the GC III/6 fighter squadron, flying the Morane-Saulnier MS.406 from Chartres. With his wingman, on 23 November 1939, Le Gloan shot down his first German aircraft, a Do 17P reconnaissance bomber. A second Dornier fell to him on 2 March 1940, and during the Battle of France, Le Gloan accounted for two Heinkel He 111 bombers.

During the winter of 1939–1940, GC III/6 was based at Wez-Thuizy near Rheims, but saw little action. In April 1940, the unit was assigned to protect Belgium, but soon moved again to Chissey, near the Alps with the French VIII Army, when a German attack in Belgium necessitated moving back to that theatre, this time to patrol the Lille-Bapaume-Cambrai area.

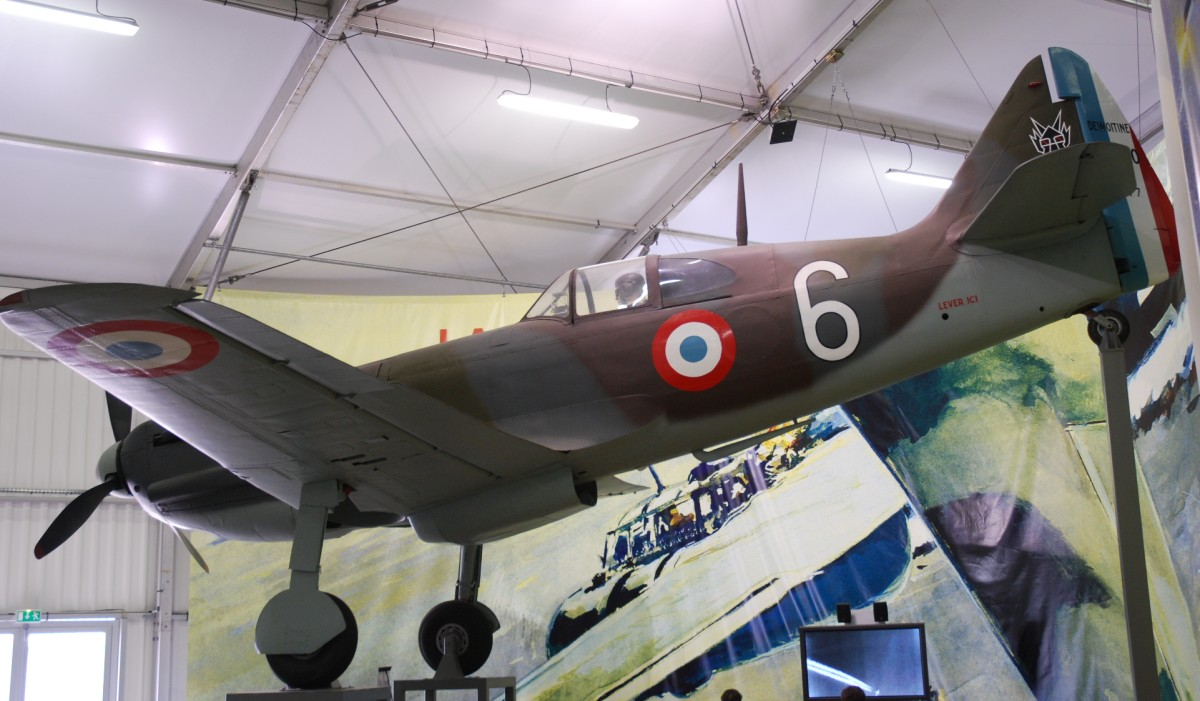
Dewoitine D.520 fighter.

On 1 June 1940, Le Gloan's squadron was moved towards southern France to Le Luc airfield and re-equipped with the new Dewoitine D.520 fighters. Their mission was to protect the port of Toulon.

Following Italy's declaration of war on France and the Italian air force commencing bombing raids, Le Gloan shot down two Fiat BR.20 bombers on 13 June. On 15 June Le Gloan with another pilot attacked 12 Italian Fiat CR.42 fighters. Le Gloan shot down three of them while Cpt. Assolent shot down another. While returning to the airfield Le Gloan shot down another CR.42 and a BR.20 bomber. For this outstanding achievement of destroying five aircraft in one flight he was promoted to 2nd lieutenant.

Due to the military situation of France on 20 June GC III/6 was withdrawn to Algiers in Algeria. After the armistice between France and Germany, and the subsequent British attacks on the French navy, French forces in North Africa, including Le Gloan's unit, became subordinated to the Vichy government.

In May 1941 GC III/6 was moved to the French colony of Syria. In June 1941, Allied forces, including some Free French units, attacked Syria and Lebanon. On 8 June 1941, Le Gloan shot down his first RAF fighter, a Hawker Hurricane. By 5 July he had claimed five Hurricanes and a Gloster Gladiator. Later the depleted GC III/6 was withdrawn back to Algiers.

During Operation Torch, the Allied invasion of North Africa in November 1942, French fighter squadrons based in Algiers, unlike those in Oran or Casablanca, did not oppose the Allied landings. Soon all French forces in North Africa had sided with the Allies. In May 1943 Le Gloan's unit, then renamed GC 3/6 Roussillon, was re-armed with new Bell P-39 Airacobra fighters. In August Le Gloan took the command of 3rd escadrille (flight) of the squadron. The unit's primary task at the time were offshore patrols.

On 11 September 1943, Le Gloan flew on patrol with another pilot. Over the sea smoke started to come out of Le Gloan's engine. He returned towards the shore but the engine stopped. He attempted a forced landing on the shore but, probably forgetting that his Airacobra still had an underbelly fuel tank attached (which were not used on earlier French fighters), the fuel in his plane exploded while trying to land, killing him instantly.

During his complicated combat career Pierre Le Gloan shot down 18 aircraft (four German, seven Italian and seven British), which made him the fourth leading French flying aces of the war.
