= Dewoitine HD.780 =

H.780

General information
- Type: Fighter floatplane
- National origin: France
- Manufacturer: Dewoitine
- Number built: 1

The Dewoitine HD.780 was a prototype French fighter-floatplane designed and built from 1938–40. It was a single-seat, single-engined aircraft based on the Dewoitine D.520 land-based fighter. A single example was built but was abandoned unflown, and was scrapped.

== Design and development ==
In 1938, the French Navy issued a requirement (C1-A75) for a fighter floatplane that could be launched from catapults aboard battleships and cruisers to give fighter protection for the fleet out of range of shore-based fighters. The new fighter would replace the Loire 210, twenty of which had been ordered in 1937, which were yet to enter service. Two designs were evaluated by the French Navy, one from Potez (the Potez-CAMS 170), and one from Émile Dewoitine's design bureau, (Note: While Dewoitine's aircraft factories had been nationalised in 1937, becoming part of SNCAM, Dewoitine maintained an independent design bureau.) the Dewoitine HD.780. The Potez design progressed no further than a full-scale mock-up, but construction of a prototype of the Dewoitine fighter started at the Bagnères-de-Bigorre factory of the railway engine manufacturer Soulé in November 1939.

The HD.780 was based on Dewoitine's D.520 landplane fighter. Its fuselage closely resembled that of the D.520, with the radiator moved from the ventral position of the D.520 to under the nose, to avoid spray from the aircraft's floats during take-off and landing. The inverted gull wings were entirely new, and were fitted with full-span slotted fowler flaps, which extended under the fuselage. The wings were designed to fold for storage aboard ship, with the wing-folding mechanism powered by compressed air. Two floats were attached to the wings by streamlined pylons. The HD.580 had an enlarged horizontal tail and fin compared with the D.520. A Hispano-Suiza 12Y-51 engine, slightly more powerful than the 12Y-31 of the D.520 and fitted with a supercharger rated to give more power at low altitude, powered the HD.580. Armament was a single engine-mounted 20 mm Hispano-Suiza HS.9 cannon, with two 7.5 mm Darne machine guns mounted in the wings.

The prototype was completed in April 1940, but did not fly, with the French Navy now wanting carrier-based fighters, ordering two prototypes of a carrier-based landplane derivative, the HD.790 and adopting the D.520 as a land-based fighter, while the Soulé factory concentrated on the D.550 derivative of the D.520. The unflown HD.780 prototype was scrapped after the Armistice of 22 June 1940 when France surrendered to Germany. The two HD.790 prototypes were unbuilt.

== Specifications (performance estimated) ==
Data from Le Dewoitine H.D.780

General characteristics

- Crew: 1
- Length: 9.70 m (31 ft 10 in)
- Wingspan: 12.00 m (39 ft 4 in)
- Height: 3.69 m (12 ft 1 in)
- Wing area: 20.15 m^{2} (216.9 sq ft)
- Empty weight: 2,091 kg (4,610 lb)
- Gross weight: 2,430 kg (5,357 lb)
- Powerplant: 1 × Hispano-Suiza HS 12Y51 liquid-cooled V12 engine, 750 kW (1,000 hp)
- Propellers: 3-bladed

Performance

- Maximum speed: 442 km/h (275 mph, 239 kn) at 2,000 m (6,600 ft)
- Stall speed: 103 km/h (64 mph, 56 kn)
- Range: 650 km (400 mi, 350 nmi)
- Service ceiling: 10,000 m (33,000 ft)

Armament

- Guns:
  - 1× 20mm Hispano-Suiza HS.9
  - 2× 7.7 mm Darne machine guns
