= Calvary at Kergrist-Moëlou =

Coordinates: 48.309937°N 3.317900°W

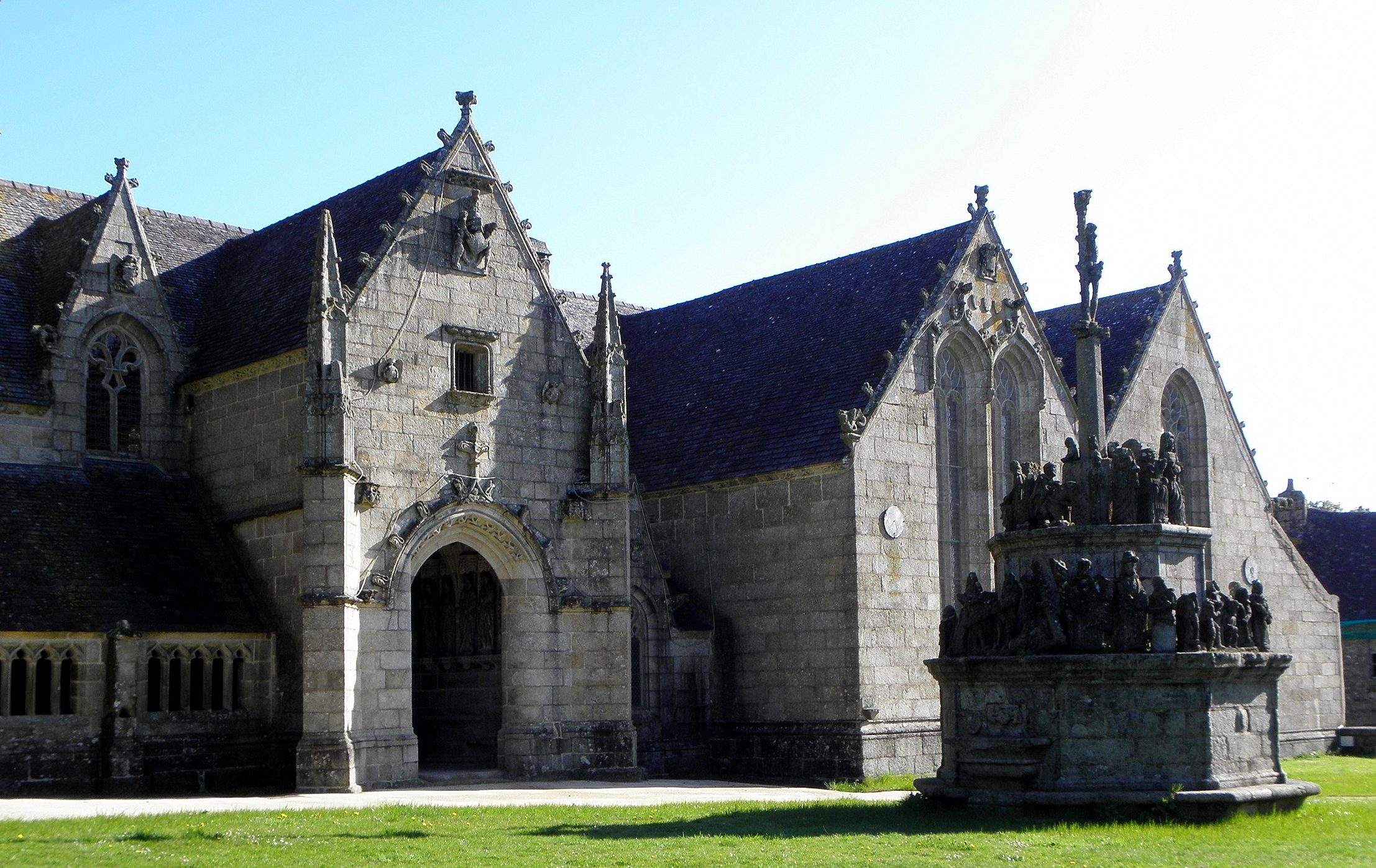
Kergrist-Moelou parish church with calvary to the right

The Calvary at Kergrist-Moëlou in the Arrondissement of Guingamp in Brittany, France, dates back to 1578. It was the work of the sculptor Guillaume Jézéquel except for the crucifix which was the work of the sculptor Yves Hernot de Lannion and was remounted on the calvary in 1896. Kergrist-Moëlou is located in the Côtes-d'Armor region, the ancient diocese of Cornouaille. Jézéquel had worked alongside his brother on the Kergrist-Moëlou church in 1554. Originally the calvary's sculpture was substantial, with records showing that it was decorated with almost one hundred statues telling the story of the life and death of Jesus Christ, but the calvary was vandalized during the 1793 French Revolution leaving many statues broken and decapitated with others disappearing completely. What is now left of the calvary stands on a large octagonal granite base and fragments of the mutilated figures are placed around the cross itself. This article gives some of the history of the calvary and describes its constituent parts.

== Brief history ==
The Notre-Dame church at Kergrist-Moëlou dates back to the early 16th Century and was built by the brothers Guillaume and Pierre Jézéquel. The calvary dates to 1578 and the sculptural work involved is attributed to Guillaume Jézéquel. It was commissioned by the Baron de Pont-l'Abbé to celebrate the recovery of his daughter who was dying but recovered after he had made a pilgrimage to Kergrist to pray for help. In style the calvary is thought to have been inspired by that at Plougonven. It stands in the churchyard and there is an inscription on the west face reading "EN L AN 1578 G. JEZEQUEL." It was restored in the 19th Century but the original order in which the pieces had been arranged was not kept to. The 1922 restoration was carried out after the calvary was declared a "Monument Historique" in 1921, becoming the only calvary in Côtes d'Armor to be given such protection. and another restoration was carried out in 1960. In the Breton language "Kergrist" means the "village of Christ". Several of the statues that survived the 1793 attack are arranged on the upper surface of the pedestal and the others stand on a ledge which runs around the pedestal's lower part.

== Statues on the calvary's upper surface ==
On the upper surface we have a depiction of a Jew thought to have been part of the original scene depicting Jesus appearing before Pontius Pilate and a man on a horse which was probably part of the original scene showing the procession involving Jesus carrying the cross to Golgotha. The horse on which the cavalier is sitting has lost part of its legs. We then have a statue depicting Saint Veronica but this is broken and faces the wrong way around, a statue of John the Evangelist of which the head is broken and a seated Saint Yves which has also suffered damage. Then comes a statue of the Virgin Mary with two devils one of which is the devil of the temptation of Eve. Next is a scene depicting the resurrection although Jesus has lost his head. He is stepping from the tomb and is surrounded by two sleeping soldiers. We also have a scene showing the mouth of hell and the descent into limbo and a depiction of the Virgin Mary with child accompanied by one magi.

== Statues on the calvary's lower ledge ==
On the lower surface we have a depictions of the Virgin of the Annunciation next to Mary Magdalene in tears. This is followed by depictions of Jesus carrying of the cross. Jesus is brought to his knees by the weight of the cross and is accompanied by two soldiers. Next we see a scene showing Jesus being crowned with a crown of thorns, Pontius Pilate washing his hands, his servant holding a bowl of water and the flagellation. Next is another scene showing Christ being crowned with a crown of thorns but of a more recent vintage. There is then a depiction of Saint Peter with sword and the arrest of Jesus. Next is the "mise au tombeau", this attended by six people. Nicodemus stands at Jesus' head but there is no statue of Joseph of Arimathea at Jesus' feet. Jesus is laying on a shroud with fringed edges that forms a semi- circle. Finally we have a scene depicting Jesus in discussion with the two lawyers, although Jesus' figure is missing. the Flight into Egypt and a scene depicting the Nativity of Jesus. In the nativity scene the Virgin Mary has lost her head whilst Joseph is shown kneeling behind the ass and the cow. A winged angel, a shepherd and two magi surround the child Jesus who is shown as a boy rather than a new-born baby.

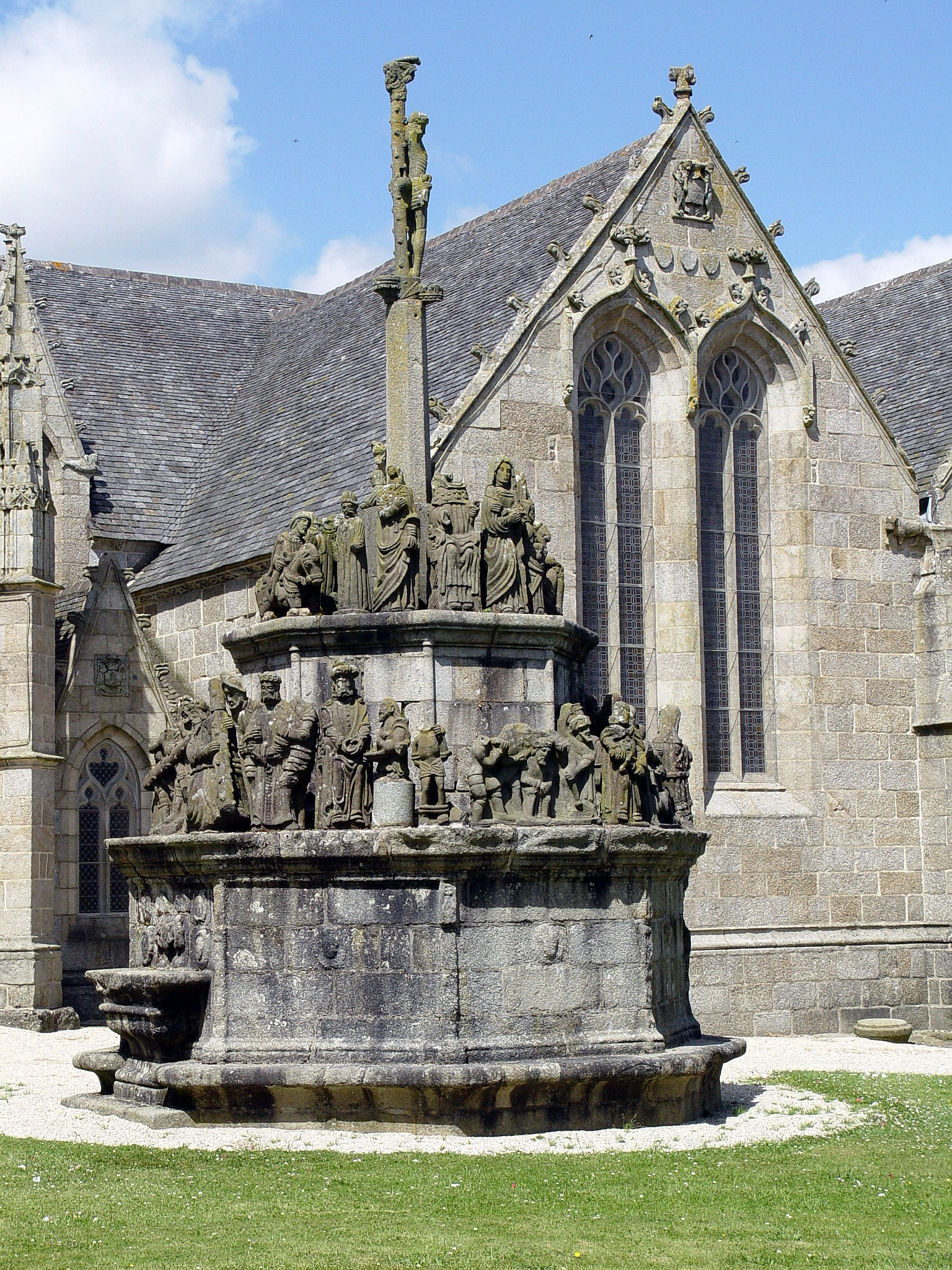
On the lower level we see Pontius Pilate washing his hands whilst a servant stands to his right with a bowl of water. Then we see what would have been part of the flagellation scene with Jesus, his feet bound and tied to a column, although Jesus has lost his head. Then we see a scene showing Jesus being crowned with thorns. To the left of Pontius Pilate, Jesus stands held by two soldiers and wearing the crown of thorns and before that we see the group including Jesus carrying the cross. On the upper surface and to the left we see the cavalier riding a horse which has lost most of its legs and on the far right the Angel of the Annunciaton

== Views of the Kergrist-Moëlou calvary ==
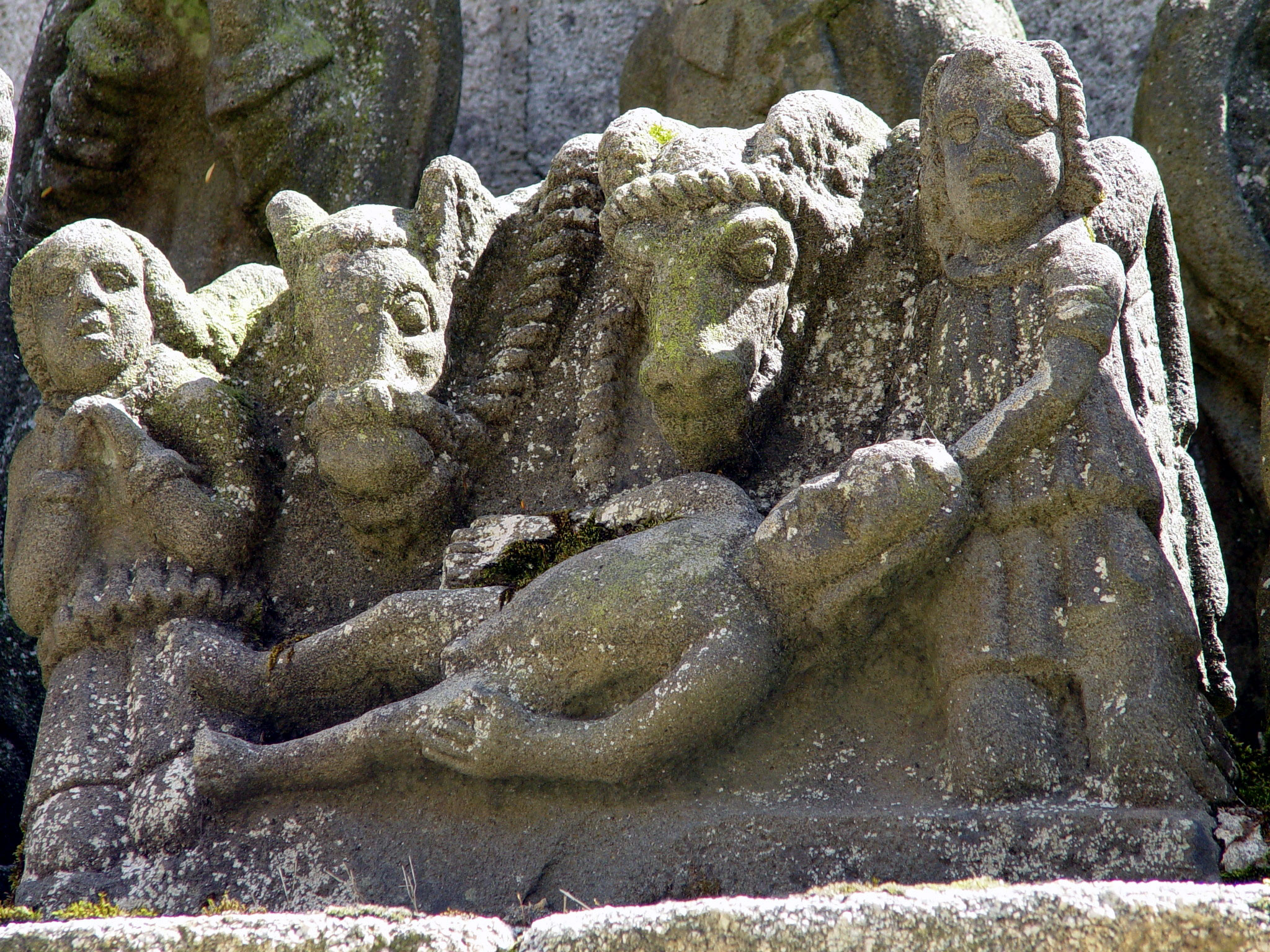
Sculpture depicting the nativity on the calvary's north face. Jesus lies between two magi whilst the heads of two cattle loom above him

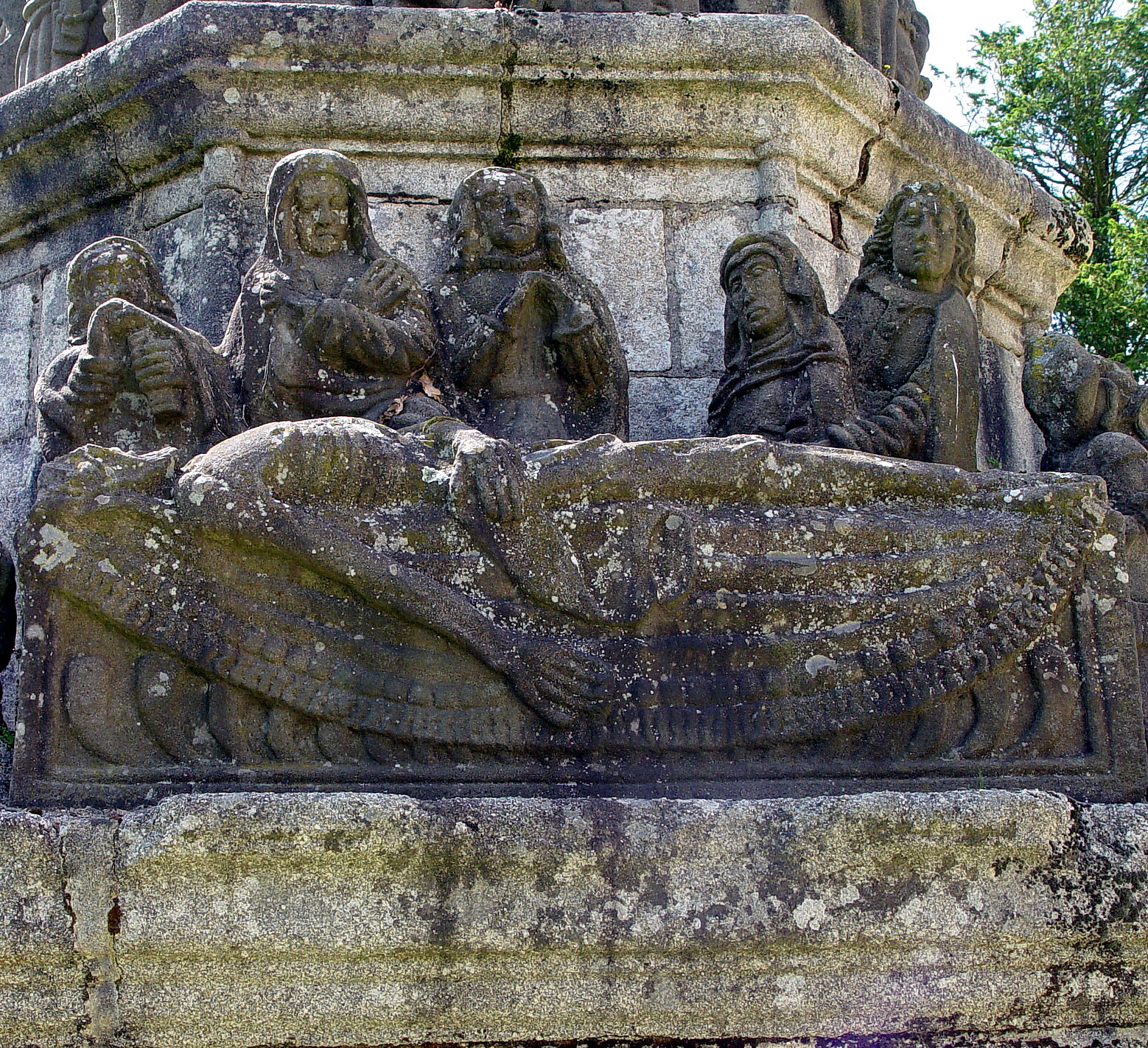
The "mise au tombeau". Jesus' body is prepared for burial. On the right Saint John is comforting the Virgin Mary

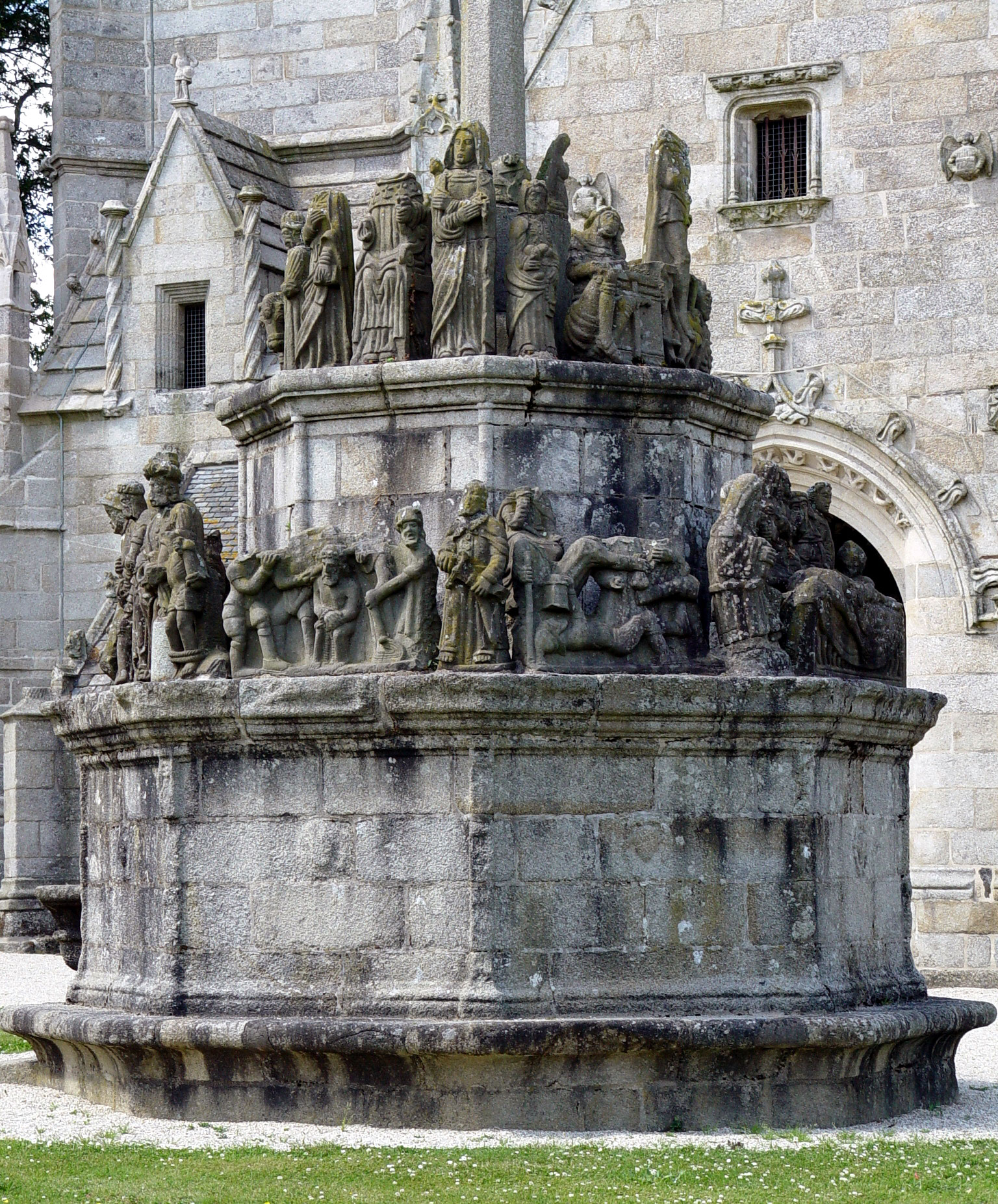
On the lower level left we see Jesus having the crown of thorns pushed onto his head. Next we see Saint Peter putting his sword back in its sheath whilst to his right are the remains of the scene which depicted Peter removing Malchus' ear and Jesus' arrest after betrayal by Judas, who stands clutching his purse. The damage to the group between Peter and Judas is very bad and the sculpture is difficult to interpret. On the upper level we see the horned devil on the right of the statue of a female saint. On her left are the two figures without heads one of whom was thought to be Saint Yves

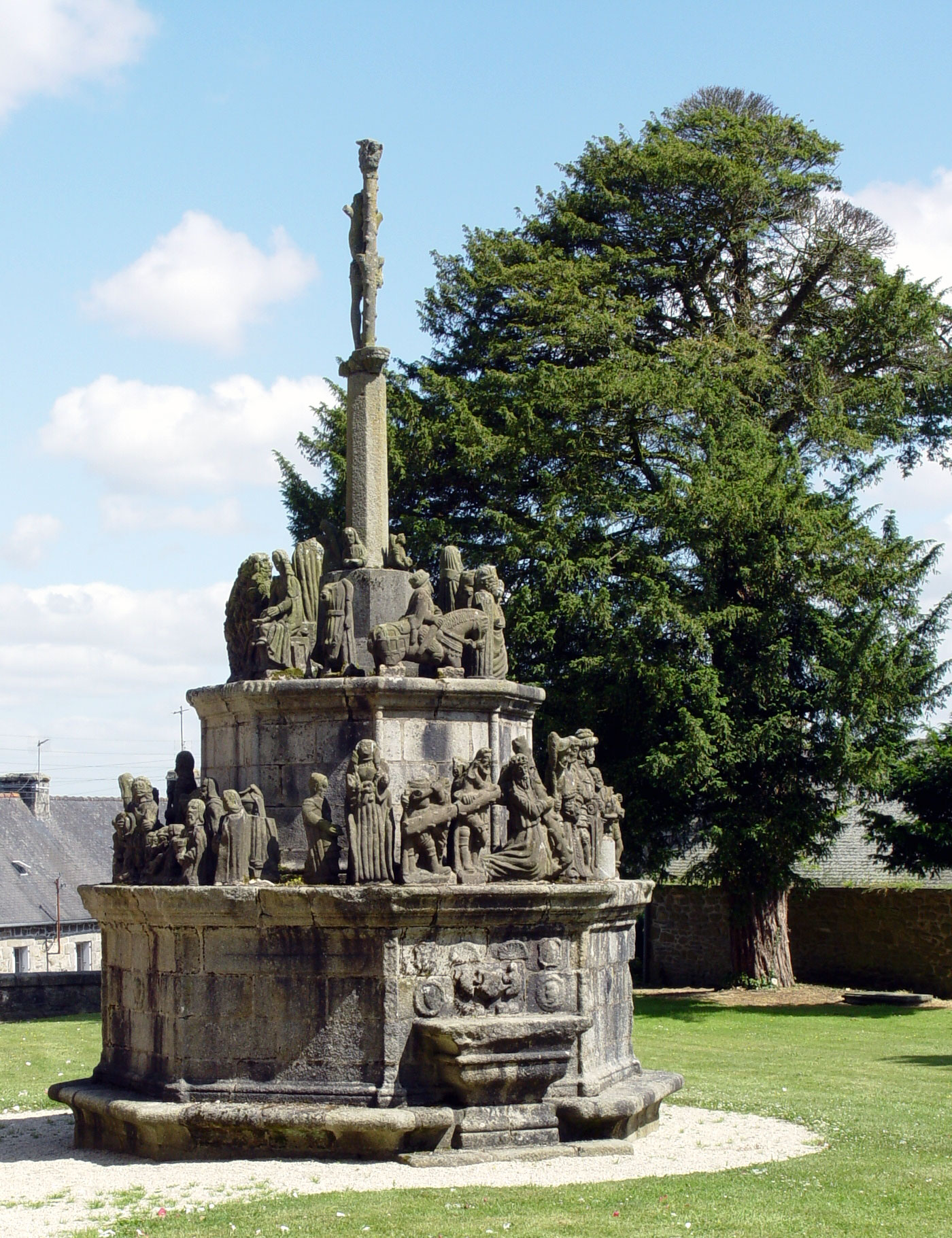
View of Kergrist-Moelou calvary. On the upper level we see the cavalier on horseback. The horse's legs are broken. To his left are two headless figures. On the lower level and from left to right we see the nativity, then Mary Magdalene in tears before the Virgin Mary whose hands are raised in blessing, followed by the group en route to Golgotha, Jesus shown carrying the cross

== Recommended reading ==
"Sculpteurs sur pierre en Basse-Bretagne. Les Ateliers du XVe au XVIIe Siècle" by Emmanuelle LeSeac'h. Published by Presses Universitaires de Rennes. ISBN 978-2-7535-3309-7. Victor-Henri Debidour. "Grands Calvaires de Bretagne". Éditions d'Art Jos Le Doaré. 1998. ISBN 2-855-43-191-3.
