= Dewoitine D.520 =

1938 fighter aircraft family by Dewoitine

D.520
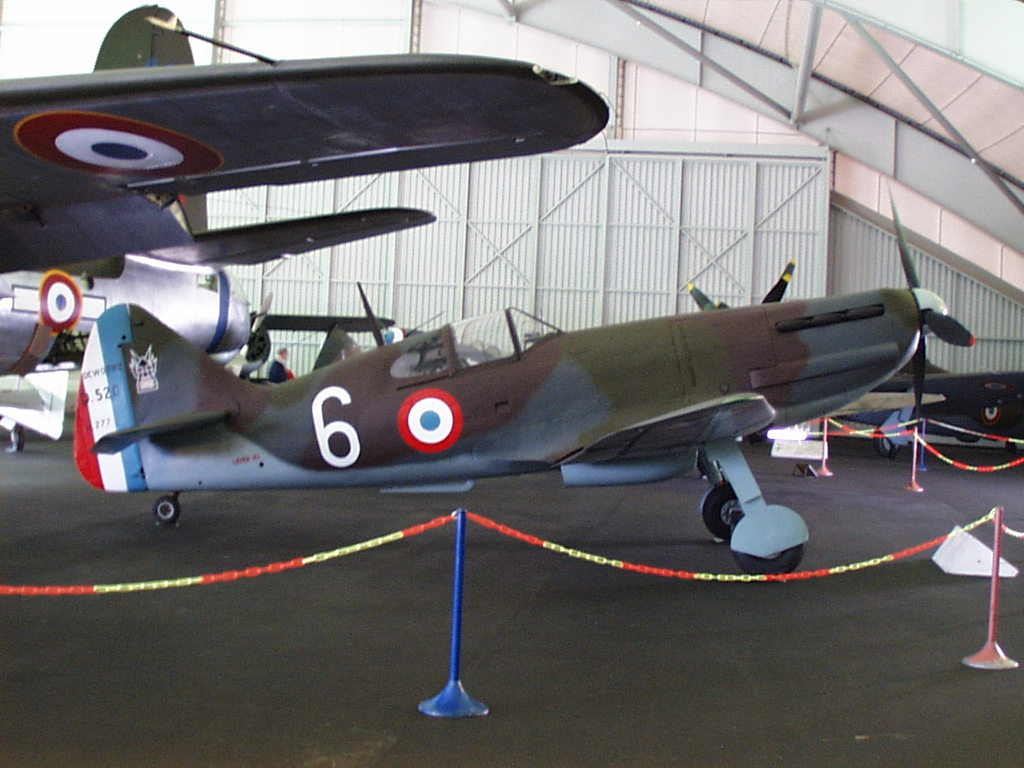

General information
- Type: Fighter aircraft
- Manufacturer: SNCAM / SNCASE
- Primary users: French Air Force Luftwaffe; Regia Aeronautica Italiana; Bulgarian Air Force
- Number built: c.900

History
- Introduction date: January 1940
- First flight: 2 October 1938
- Retired: 1953

The Dewoitine D.520 is a French fighter aircraft that entered service in early 1940, shortly after the beginning of the Second World War.

The D.520 was designed in response to a 1936 requirement from the French Air Force for a fast, modern fighter with a good climbing speed and an armament centred on a 20 mm cannon. At the time the most powerful V-12 liquid-cooled engine available in France was the Hispano-Suiza 12Y, which was less powerful, but lighter than contemporary engines such as the Rolls-Royce Merlin and Daimler-Benz DB 601. Other fighters were designed to meet the specifications but none of them entered service, or entered service in small numbers, too late to play a significant role during the Battle of France.

Unlike the Morane-Saulnier M.S.406, which was at that time the most numerous fighter in the French Air Force, the Dewoitine D.520 came close to being a match for the latest German types, such as the Messerschmitt Bf 109. It was slower than the Bf 109E but superior in manoeuvrability. Because of production delays, only a small number were available for combat against the Luftwaffe. The D.520 proved to be relatively capable as a dogfighter against the Luftwaffe's inventory, but lacked sufficient numbers to make a difference.

Following the armistice of 1940, the D.520 continued to be used, being operated by both the Free French Air Force and the Vichy French Air Force. The type was also returned to production during 1942, although it was manufactured at a lower rate than it had been during 1940. Additional examples were operated by the Luftwaffe, Regia Aeronautica Italiana, and the Bulgarian Air Force. The D.520 saw combat service in North Africa, Bulgaria, and the Eastern Front, as well as use in France and Germany for training and defence purposes. During the type's later life, it was used as a trainer aircraft. On 3 September 1953, the last D.520s were finally withdrawn from service.

== Development ==
=== Background ===
On 13 July 1934, the French Air Force launched a new technical programme, under which the development of improved fighter aircraft to improve upon the Dewoitine D.510, which was yet to enter service at that point but was already considered to be obsolete in the face of rapid advances being made in several European nations. While French aircraft company Dewoitine initially responded with an improved design based on the D.510, designated as the D.513, this quickly proved to be inferior to the in-development Morane-Saulnier M.S.405, a domestic competitor.

In response to a specification for a new fighter promulgated by the French Air Ministry on 15 June 1936, Émile Dewoitine, owner and founder of Dewoitine, formed a new private design office and ordered the firm's chief engineer, Robert Castello, to immediately study the development of a new fighter. The envisioned aircraft would be as affordable as possible, be powered by the new 670 kW (900 hp) Hispano-Suiza 12Y21 liquid-cooled engine, and be capable of attaining 500 km/h (310 mph). However, the corresponding design was promptly rejected by the Air Ministry. The design had been rejected by the French Air Ministry, which, after being impressed by the British Hawker Hurricane and Supermarine Spitfire, had decided to respond by uprating the specifications to include a maximum speed requirement of 500 km/h (310 mph).

Accordingly, work on what would become the D.520 commenced in September 1936; according to aviation author Raymond Danel, the D.520 designation was a deliberate reference to the required speed of the aircraft. During January 1937, this revised design proposal was submitted to the Service Technique Aeronautique (STA); while the STAe found the design to be likely to conform with the specified requirements, no order for prototypes to be built was immediately forthcoming. By this point, official attention was oriented towards the MS.405, which had already been selected for the re-equipment effort.

=== Specification and rivals ===
On 12 January 1937, the A.23 technical programme was launched by the Air Ministry. The specifications called for a maximum speed of 520 km/h (320 mph) at 4,000 m (13,000 ft), the ability to climb to 8,000 m (26,000 ft) in less than fifteen minutes, with takeoff and landing runs not exceeding 400 m (1,300 ft). The armament was to be two 7.5 mm (0.295 in) machine guns and one 20 mm (0.787 in) Hispano-Suiza HS.9 cannon, or two HS.9 cannons.

Other aircraft designed to the same specification included the Morane-Saulnier M.S.450, the Loire-Nieuport 60 (later C.A.O 200), and the Caudron-Renault C.770, none of which either left the drawing board or entered service. Two other concurrent French designs, the Bloch MB.152.01 and Bloch MB.155.C1 series and the Arsenal VG-33 entered service in small numbers with the French Air Force during the Battle of France, but too late to play a significant role.

In addition to the lack of a prototype order, Dewoitine was absorbed into the larger Société nationale des constructions aéronautiques du Midi (SNCAM) state-owned manufacturing consortium. As a result of this organisational restricting, along with continued alterations within the French Air Force's established manufacturing programmes, work on the design of the D.520 was suspended throughout much of 1937, and it was not until January 1938 that a small number of draughtsmen started work on the first detailed drawings for the prototype.

However, Émile Dewoitine, now the deputy managing director of SNCAM, was keen to proceed with the project and decided to proceed to the detail design drawing phase with the aim of producing a pair of prototypes and a single structural test frame, confident that official interest would be found for the type. On 3 April 1938, this private initiative was rewarded with the issuing of Air Ministry contract No. 513/8, which regularised the programme; by this point, the first prototype had almost been completed.

=== Modifications and first prototypes ===
On 2 October 1938, the first prototype aircraft, D.520-01, powered by a Hispano-Suiza 12Y-21 engine that temporarily drove a fixed-pitch, two-bladed wooden propeller, performed its maiden flight. Completion of the prototype had been delayed somewhat by the need to incorporate modifications requested by the STAe following their examination of a wooden mock-up of the type. During early flight tests, the first prototype managed to reach only 480 km/h (300 mph), and suffered from dangerously high engine temperatures.

A large portion of responsibility for the encountered temperature issue was judged to have been a product of greater than expected drag resulting from the underwing radiators, which exhausted across the upper wing surface and were relatively inefficient; this arrangement was replaced with a single radiator unit housed under the fuselage in a streamlined fairing. Other aerodynamic improvements were made around this time, such as the minor enlargement of the fin and rudder, for greater lateral stability.

After sustaining minor damage in a landing accident on 27 November 1938, caused by the failure to deploy the undercarriage, further modifications were made to the prototype. These included changing the engine to a newer -29 model and incorporating exhaust ejectors which provided added thrust, along with a three-blade variable-pitch propeller. These changes were enough to allow the aircraft to reach its design speed, achieving 530 km/h (330 mph). The maximum diving speed was 825 km/h (513 mph), as reached on 6 February 1939.

=== Additional prototypes ===
During 1939, the first prototype was followed by two further examples: the D.520-02 and the 03, these were first flown on 9 January 1939 and 5 May 1939, respectively. The major differences between the first prototype and the second and third were the adoption of a new sliding canopy, the fitting of a re-designed and larger tail unit, and longer Oleo-manufactured undercarriage legs; they also omitted the Handley Page slats fitted to the outer wings on 01.

These prototypes were also armed with a single 20 mm (0.787 in) Hispano-Suiza HS.9 cannon with the barrel was in a sleeve between the cylinder banks and fired through the propeller spinner. (Note: This was a feature introduced by Hispano-Suiza during the First World War and later found on many German designs (as the Motorkanone), as well as on Russian derivatives of the 12Y engine.) and a pair of MAC 1934 7.5 mm (0.295 in) machine guns, each initially with 300 rounds per gun, housed in small pods under the wing. The third prototype also introduced a small tailwheel instead of the original skid. The second prototype was later fitted with a Hispano-Suiza 12Y-31 engine and achieved a maximum speed of 550 km/h (340 mph) and reached 8,000 m (26,000 ft) in 12 minutes 53 seconds.

In response to Belgian interest in the D.520, who were at one stage preparing to negotiate for a licence to produce the type, several evaluation flights of the third prototype were flown by Belgian test pilot Captain Arendt. During late September 1939, CEMA took charge of the third prototype to conduct armament trials. Overall, flight tests had proceeded successfully, and resulted in the issuing of a contract in March 1939 for 200 production machines to be powered by the newer -31 engine (later replaced by the -45). A contract for an additional 600 aircraft was issued in June, albeit reduced to 510 in July 1939.

=== Production ===
In April 1939, the rate of production of fighter aircraft throughout France was far beneath official expectations. With the outbreak of war, a new contract brought the total of D.520s on order to 1,280, with the production rate to be 200 aircraft per month from May 1940. During January 1940, the Aéronautique Navale placed its own order for 120 aircraft. Another French Air Force order in April 1940 brought the total to 2,250 and increased production quotas to 350 a month. In addition to domestic orders, Poland was interested in acquiring around 160 D.520s in order.

On 2 November 1939, the first-production D.520 conducted its first flight. On this and the other aircraft, the rear fuselage was extended by 51 cm (20 in), the engine cowling panels were redesigned, the curved, one-piece windscreen was replaced by one containing an optically flat panel and armour plate was fitted behind the pilot's seat. Most production examples were powered by the 935 CV (688 kW; 922 hp) Hispano-Suiza 12Y-45 with the new Szydlowski-Planiol supercharger, although later production versions used the 960 CV (710 kW; 950 hp) Hispano-Suiza 12Y-49. The production standard armament was a 20 mm (0.787 in) HS.404 cannon firing through the propeller hub and four belt-fed MAC 1934 M39 7.5 mm (0.295 in) machine guns in the wings.

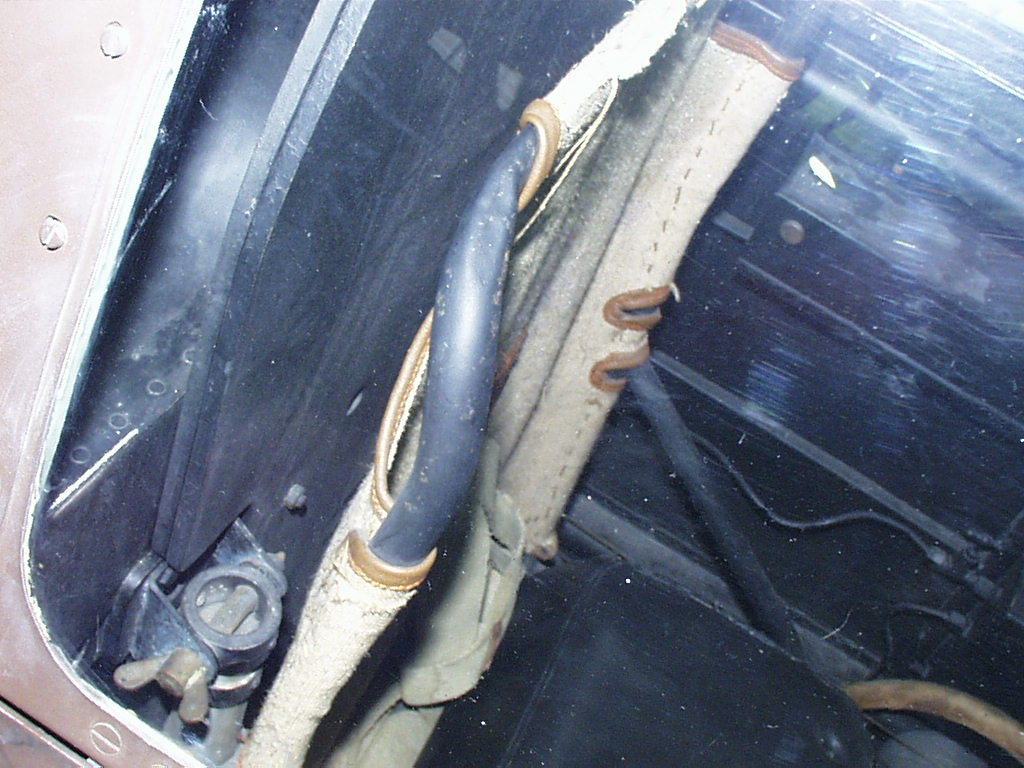
The D.520 on display at Le Bourget showing the pilot's seat and armour plate

As the first batch of D.520s rolled off the production line, they failed acceptance tests due to insufficient top speed and troublesome cooling. Redesigned compressor intakes, a modified cooling circuit and propulsive exhaust pipes proved to be effective remedies of these shortcomings, but as early examples had to be retrofitted with these improvements, the type was not declared combat ready until April 1940, at which point the D.520's operational standards had been defined. In order to speed up the redesign process, a total of four production aircraft were handed back to SNCAM to serve as special test machines.

The manufacturing process was deliberately optimized, each aircraft consumed a reduced 7,000 man-hours each to produce, roughly half the time compared to the previous D.510 and MS.406, and far less than many other fighters of the time, such as the MC.200/202 (21,000 hours), but around 50% greater than a Bf 109E (4,500 hours). The French Air Ministry planned for over 300 aircraft a month to be built and managed to reach this goal, especially in June 1940, but it was too late to affect the tide of battle. The armistice greatly curtailed production of D.520, which would have otherwise been a fighter aircraft produced in far greater numbers and with improved models.

Additional plans had included another manufacturing line at Asnières-sur-Seine, Paris, for a lightened version of the aircraft, known as the D.521. An initial batch of 18 pre-production D.521s had been produced at Bagnères-de-Bigorre, Occitanie and had been prepared for their maiden flight when the armistice came into effect. During 1940, negotiations with American manufacturer Ford had been underway with the aim of establishing the licensed production of an Americanised version of the type, designated as the D.522. This model was anticipated to have been powered by an Allison V-1710-C15 engine, capable of generating 780 kW (1,040 hp), instead.

In April 1941, during the aftermath of the armistice with Germany, a new programme was launched in which the production of 1,074 new aircraft were to be manufactured in the unoccupied zone of Vichy France. Of these, 550 were to be D.520s, which were confirmed as ordered under contract No. 157/41 on 8 August 1941. The intention was for the type to replace all other single-engine fighters that remained in service with the Vichy French Air Force and to eventually equip additional units that were to be reformed from September 1942 onwards. An initial batch of 22 D.520s were delivered during August 1941. In total, a further 180 machines were constructed, bringing the production total to 905.

== Design ==
=== Overview ===
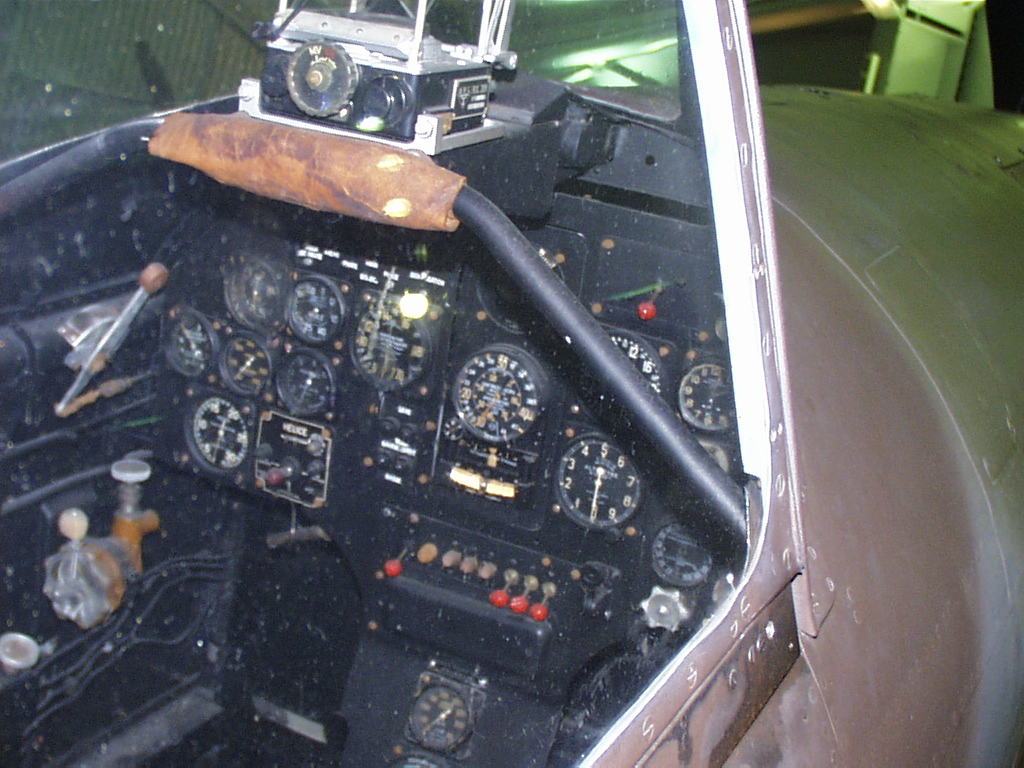
Gunsight and instrument panel from the D.520 on display at Le Bourget

The Dewoitine D.520 was a French fighter aircraft, intended to be a capable contemporary of types such as the Messerschmitt Bf 109 and Supermarine Spitfire. An all-metal structure was used, except for fabric-covered ailerons and tail surfaces. The wing, even if single-spar, was a solid and rigid unit with a secondary spar and many reinforced parts. The inwardly retracting undercarriage had a broad 2.83 m (9 ft 3 in) track, and was fitted with wide, low-pressure tyres.

The D.520 was designed to be maintained easily with many inspection panels, a rare feature for its time. Recharging the D.520 ammunition was swift and easy; the machine gun magazines required five minutes each and three minutes for the 20 mm (0.787 in) cannon. To fill the machine gun ammunition boxes took 15 minutes, while five minutes were needed to empty it as the cartridges were not expelled. The D.520's cockpit was set well back in the fuselage, aft of the trailing edge of the wings. This gave the pilot good downward visibility, but the long nose in front of him was a drawback when taxiing on the ground.

A self-sealing fuel tank with a capacity of 396 L (87 imp gal; 105 US gal) was mounted between the engine and cockpit, along with two wing tanks which, combined, carried another 240 L (53 imp gal; 63 US gal), for a total of 636 L (140 imp gal; 168 US gal); this was considerably more than the contemporary Bf 109E, Spitfire I and early Italian fighters, each with about 400 L (88 imp gal; 110 US gal) fuel capacity. The ferry range was from 1,300 to 1,500 km (810 to 930 mi) at 450 km/h (280 mph) which, from June 1940, allowed D.520s to escape to North Africa when France fell.

=== Engine ===
The Hispano-Suiza 12Y-45 engine was an underpowered, older design, with 850 CV (630 kW; 840 hp) at takeoff at 2,400 rpm, or 935 CV (688 kW; 922 hp) emergency power at 2,520 rpm and at a height of 1,900 m (6,200 ft). The Hispano engine had some advantages over some later engines; for example, its weight was only 515 kg (1,135 lb), compared to the 620 kg (1,370 lb) of the Rolls-Royce Merlin III. Development of the engine had not been straightforward, and had delayed production. According to an aviation author, it was alleged by American aviator Charles Lindbergh that secret negotiations were conducted between Dewoitine and Daimler-Benz during 1939 to obtain the DB.601 engine for the D.520, but that these did not come to fruition due to the war.

Fuel was fed via six Solex S.V. 56 carburettors mounted on an inlet manifold which directed compressed air from the supercharger to the engine cylinders; the 12Y-45 and -49s fitted to production D.520s used either 92 or 100 octane fuel. The -45 drove an electrically operated Ratier Type 1606M three-bladed, 3-metre-diameter (9.8 ft), variable-pitch propeller, while D.520s from No. 351 were fitted with the 12Y-49 960 CV (710 kW; 950 hp) engine driving a Chauvière type 3918 pneumatically operated propeller, 3 m (9.8 ft) in diameter.

By 1940 a version of the 520D was flying with a Rolls-Royce Merlin X engine. Ernest Hives stated that agreement had been reached with the French Government for the manufacture of the Merlin in France. ("The Merlin in perspective" - A Harvey-Bailey -Rolls-Royce Heritage Trust, p130)

=== Cockpit, control and fire suppression systems ===
The D.520 had a fire-suppression system with a fire extinguisher activated from the cockpit. The engine was started by a simple but effective system, operating with compressed air. A Viet 250 air compressor charged several air bottles (one with a 12-litre capacity, as well as another eight litre tank, three smaller one litre units were matched to the weapons). The 12-litre air bottle was used for the brakes and later, for the Chauvière propeller's constant speed adjustment. The small air bottles provided up to 12 seconds at 9,000 m (30,000 ft) or 20 seconds at low level, before the Viet air compressor recharged them. The pilot had a complete set of cockpit instruments, and a ten-litre oxygen bottle located in the fuselage just behind his seat, with either a Munerelle or Gourdou oxygen regulator system mounted on the right instrument panel. Equipment included a Radio Industrie Type Rl 537 radio-receiver set, an OPL RX 39 reflector sight (less effective than the Revi system), a height-adjustable seat, and a sliding canopy with large, clear panels. Except over the long nose, the pilot's view was good, since he was seated quite high over the forward fuselage; however, no rear-facing mirrors were fitted.

=== Armament ===
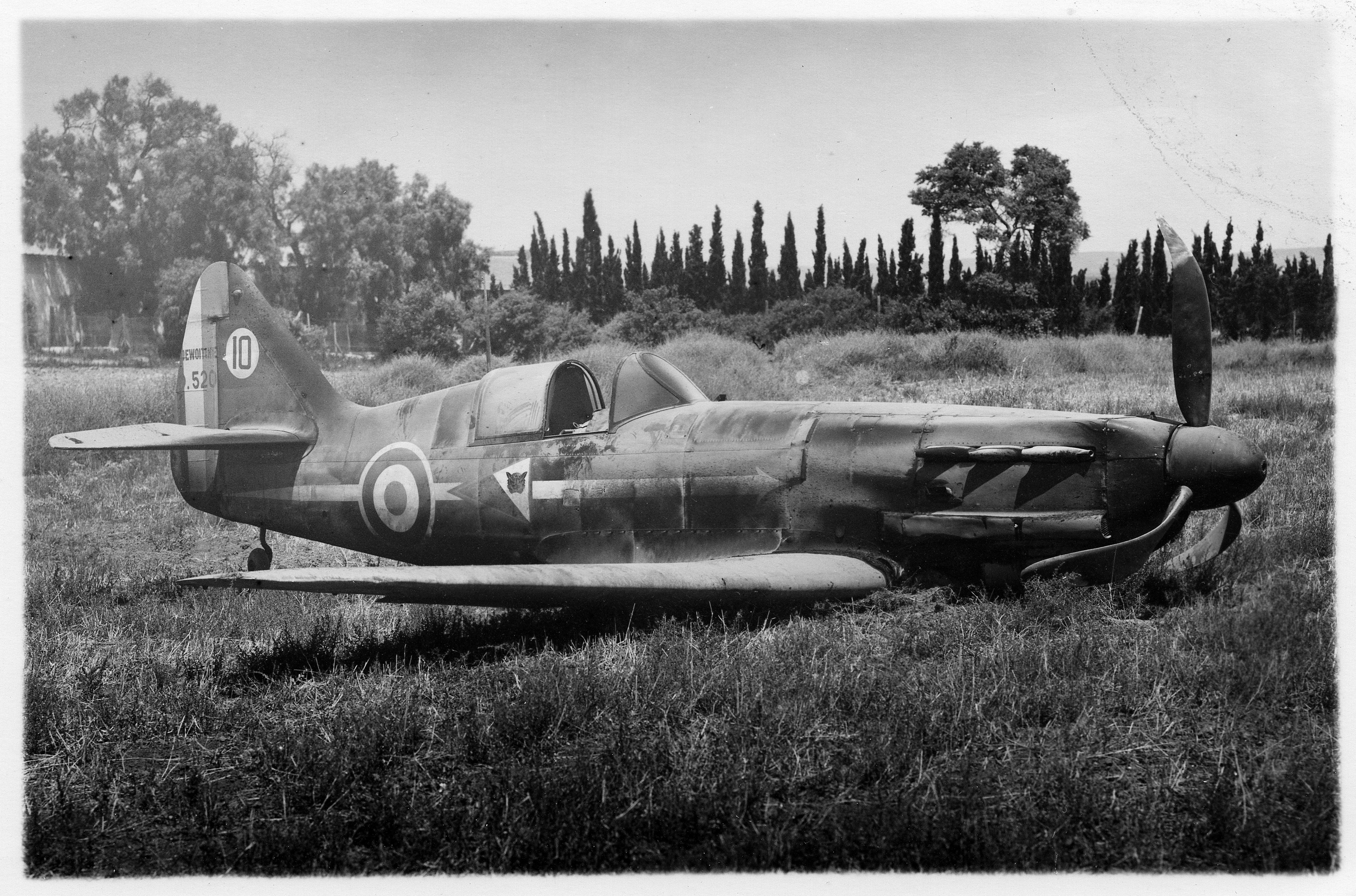
A D.520 after crash landing

Production-standard armament consisted of a 20 mm (0.787 in) HS.404, which had an ammunition capacity of 60 rounds, firing through the propeller hub, and four belt-fed MAC 1934 M39 7.5 mm (0.295 in) machine guns in the wings, with 675 rounds per gun. The MAC 1934 machine guns had a high rate of fire of 1,200 rounds per minute (rpm), while the HS.404 had an effective rate of fire of 600 rpm and was accurate up to 500 m (1,600 ft); the ammunition capacity meant that the machine guns could be fired for a total of 30 seconds, while the cannon had ten seconds' worth of ammunition.

In combat, the MS.406 had only a pair of 7.5 mm (0.295 in) machine guns and was, therefore, at a disadvantage when the HS.404 had used up its ammunition, while a D.520 could continue to fight effectively because it had four fast-firing machine guns (over 80 rounds/sec), with 20-plus seconds of ammunition still available. The D.520 had provisions for two BE33 "illuminating bombs", useful for nocturnal interception missions, but these were seldom used because French fighters rarely flew nighttime missions.

=== Flight performance ===
Although employing a modern design philosophy for its time, the D.520 was considered more difficult to fly than the older MS.406. Captain Eric Brown, commanding officer of the Royal Aircraft Establishment's Captured Enemy Aircraft Flight, tested the D.520 at RAE Farnborough, saying that "It was a nasty little brute. Looked beautiful but didn't fly beautifully. Once you get it on the ground, I was told not to leave the controls until it was in the hangar and the engine stopped. You could be taxiing toward the hangar and sit back when suddenly it would go in a right angle."

The handling changed according to the amount of fuel carried; using the fuselage tank alone, fuel consumption had no appreciable effect on handling because the tank was at the centre of gravity, but with full wing tanks, directional control was compromised, especially in a dive. The flight controls were well harmonized and the aircraft was easy to control at high speed. The maximum dive speed tested was 830 km/h (520 mph) with no buffeting and excellent stability both in the dive (depending on fuel load) and as a gun platform.

== Operational history ==
=== France ===
==== Battle of France ====
The Groupe de Chasse I/3 was the first unit to get the D.520, receiving its first aircraft in January 1940. These initial examples were unarmed and used for pilot training. In April and May 1940, operational units received 34 'war-capable' production D.520s; the type quickly proved to be highly popular with pilots and ground crew. During comparative trials on 21 April 1940 at CEMA at Orleans-Bricy against a captured Bf 109E-3, the German aircraft had a 32 km/h (20 mph) speed advantage owing to its more powerful engine. However, the D.520 had superior maneuverability, matching its turning circle, although displaying nasty characteristics when departing and spinning out of the turn repeatedly during the tests. The Bf 109, owing to its slats, could easily sustain the turn on the edge of a stall.

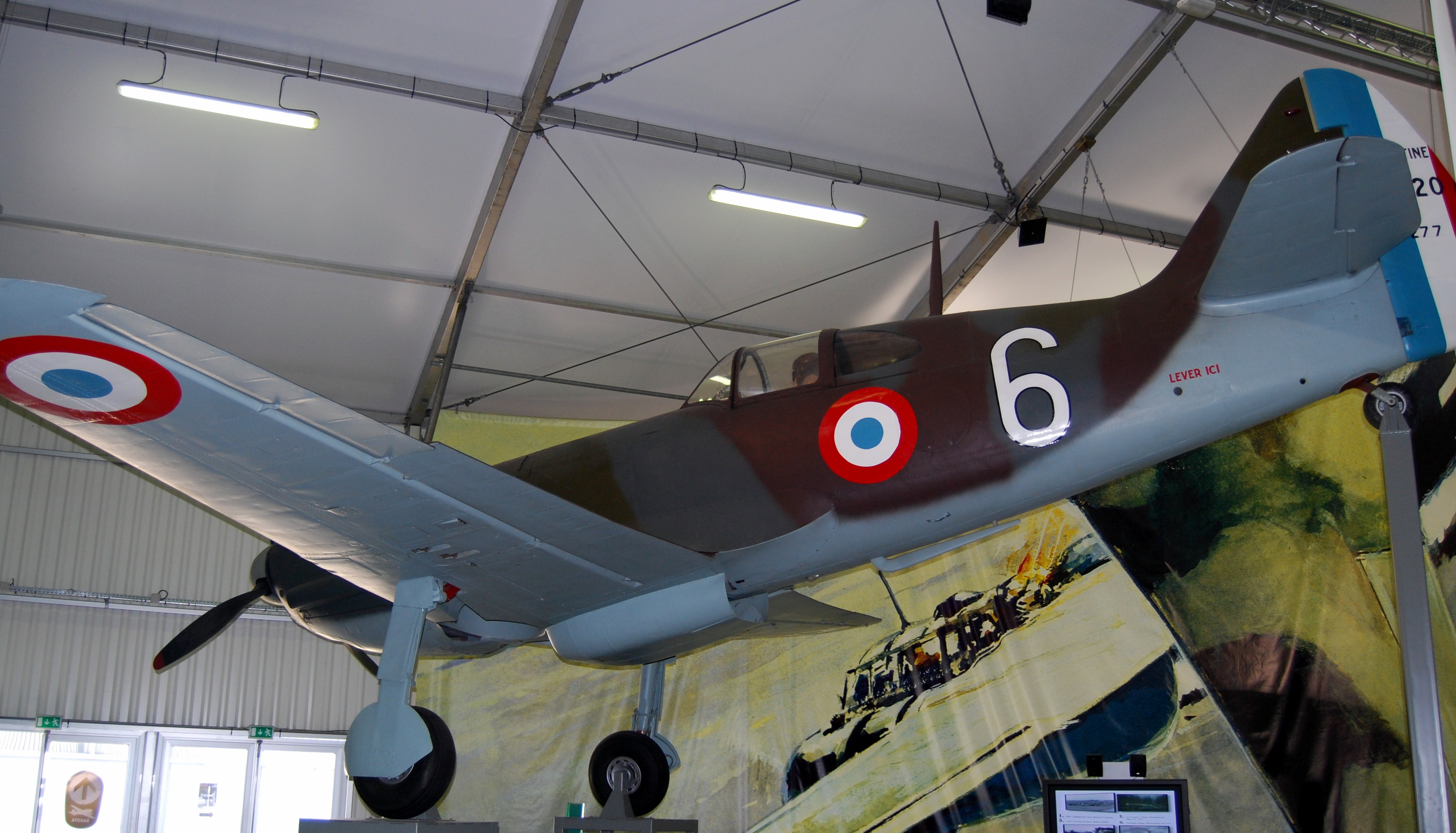
Dewoitine D.520 on display at Le Bourget

By 10 May 1940, when the Phoney War came to an end as Germany launched the invasion of France and the Low Countries, a total of 246 D.520s had been manufactured, but the French Air Force had accepted only 79 of these, as most others had been sent back to the factory to be retrofitted to the new standard. As a result, only GC I/3 was fully equipped, possessing a force of 36 aircraft. These met the Luftwaffe on 13 May, shooting down three Henschel Hs 126s and one Heinkel He 111 without suffering any losses. The next day, two D.520s were lost while a total of ten Luftwaffe aircraft (4 Messerschmitt Bf 110s, 2 Bf 109Es, 2 Dornier Do 17s, and 2 He 111s) were confirmed to be destroyed.

Four more Groupes de Chasse and three naval Escadrilles rearmed with the type before France's surrender. GC II/3, GC III/3, GC III/6 and GC II/7 later completed conversion on the D.520. A naval unit, the 1^{er} Flotille de Chasse, was also equipped with the Dewoitine. However, only GC I/3, II/7, II/6 and the naval AC 1 saw any action in the Battle of France. GC III/7 converted to the D.520 too late to be involved in any action. In addition, several aircraft were flown by non-operational units, such as the special patrol of the École de l'air military school, as well as a handful flown by Polish and civilian pilots in defence of airstrips and production facilities in the vicinity of Toulouse.

In air combat, mostly against the Italians, the Dewoitine 520s claimed 114 air victories, plus 39 probables. Eighty five D.520s were lost. By the armistice at the end of June 1940, 437 D.520s had been constructed, 351 of these having been delivered. After the armistice, 165 D.520s were evacuated to North Africa. GC I/3, II/3, III/3, III/6 and II/7 flew their aircraft to Algeria to avoid capture. Three more, from GC III/7, escaped to Britain and were delivered to the Free French. A total of 153 D.520s remained in unoccupied mainland France.

One of the most successful D.520 pilots was Pierre Le Gloan, who shot 18 aircraft down (four Germans, seven Italian and seven British), scoring all but two of his kills with the D.520, and ranked as the fourth-highest French ace of the war.

==== Under Vichy ====
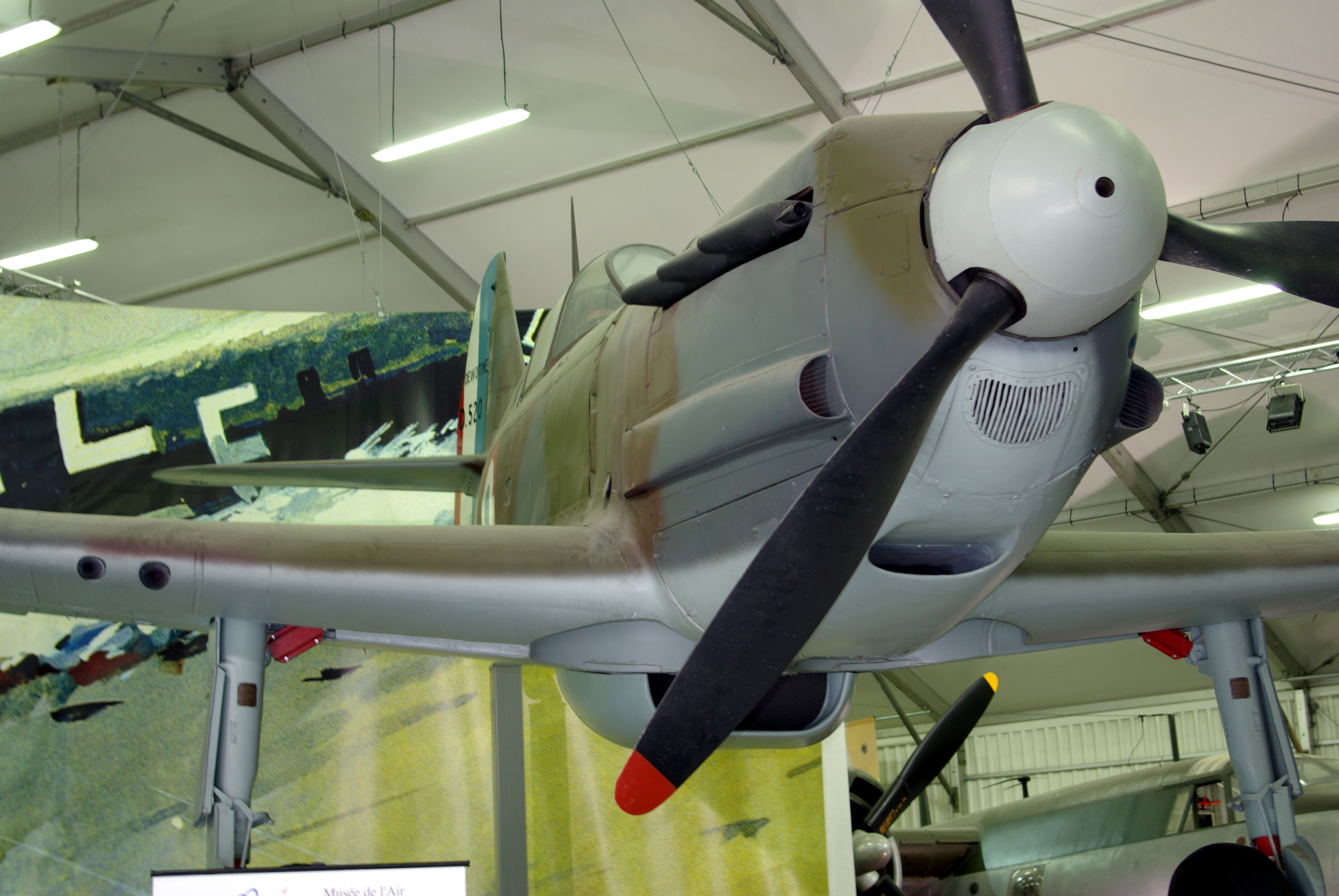
Dewoitine D.520 exhibited at the Air & Space Museum at Le Bourget

In April 1941, the German armistice commission authorized Vichy authorities to resume production of a batch of 1,000 military aircraft for their own use, under the condition that 2,000 German-designed aircraft would later be manufactured in France and delivered to Germany. As part of this agreement, 550 examples of the D.520 were ordered to replace all other single-seat fighters in service. However, no D.520 units were to be stationed on the French mainland, thus individual aircraft were instead stored or dispatched to units overseas, such as in North Africa.

The plan was to have the Dewoitine eventually equip a total of 17 Groupes with 442 aircraft, three escadrilles of the Aéronautique navale with 37 aircraft each, plus three training units with 13 aircraft. The agreement stated that aircraft of this new batch were to be similar to the ones already in service. From serial number 543 on, however, D.520s used the 12Y-49 engine that had a slightly higher rated performance than the 12Y-45, although the German Armistice Commission explicitly prohibited replacing the original power plants with the more powerful 12Y51 or 12Z engines.

In 1941, D.520s of GC III/6, II/3 and naval escadrille 1AC fought the Allies during the Syria–Lebanon campaign. The Vichy French Air Force was already relatively strong, but several units were sent to reinforce it. D.520s were the only French single-seat fighters capable of making the trip to Syria. The GC III/6 was sent first. The ferry trip was very difficult for a 1940 interceptor and the pilots pushed their planes as far as their fuel tanks would allow them to. They flew from France to Syria with intermediate stops at Rome, Brindisi or Catania. Another route was available through Germany and Greece (Athens), but it was seldom used. The trip always included a stopover in Rhodes (which had an Italian base at the time), before the final flight to Syria. This meant several thousand kilometers were flown over mountains and sea. The most demanding part was Catania-Rhodes, which entailed no less than 1,200 km (750 mi) flown over water. Even the trip from Rhodes to Syria was 800 km (500 mi). LeO 451s and Martin 167F bombers had few problems, but D.520s were forced to fly a strenuous and dangerous mission, without any help or external assistance. Of the 168 French aircraft (of all types) sent to Syria, 155 accomplished their mission and arrived successfully. The Vichy Air force was numerically strong, but with very few ground crew and spare parts, which meant that the operational flying time for the D.520s was very limited. D.520s of GC III/6 first saw action against British aircraft on 8 June 1941, when they shot down three Fairey Fulmars, losing one D.520 (its pilot was taken prisoner). Over the following days several escort missions were flown to protect Martin, LeO and Bloch 200 (3/39 Esc) bombers from British Royal Navy fighters. Two Hurricanes were shot down (with another D.520 lost) on 9 June.

During the Syria campaign, a total of 266 missions were conducted by the Vichy French Air Force: 99 of them were carried out by D.520s, nine by MS.406s, 46 by Martin 167s and 31 by LeO 451s. On 10 July, five D.520s attacked Bristol Blenheim bombers from No. 45 Squadron RAF that were being escorted by seven Curtiss Tomahawks from No. 3 Squadron RAAF (3 Sqn). The French pilots claimed three Blenheims, but at least four of the D.520s were destroyed by the Australian escorts, including two by flying officer Peter Turnbull. The following day, a Dewoitine pilot shot a P-40 down from 3 Sqn, the only Tomahawk lost during the campaign. This Dewoitine was in turn shot down by F/O Bobby Gibbes. The initial advantage that the Vichy French Air Force enjoyed did not last long, and they lost most of their aircraft during the campaign. The majority of them were destroyed on the ground where the flat terrain, absence of infrastructure and absence of modern anti-aircraft (AA) artillery made them vulnerable to air attacks. On 26 June, a strafing run by Tomahawks of 3 Sqn, on Homs airfield, destroyed five D.520s of Fighter Squadron II/3 (Groupe de Chasse II/3) and damaged six more.

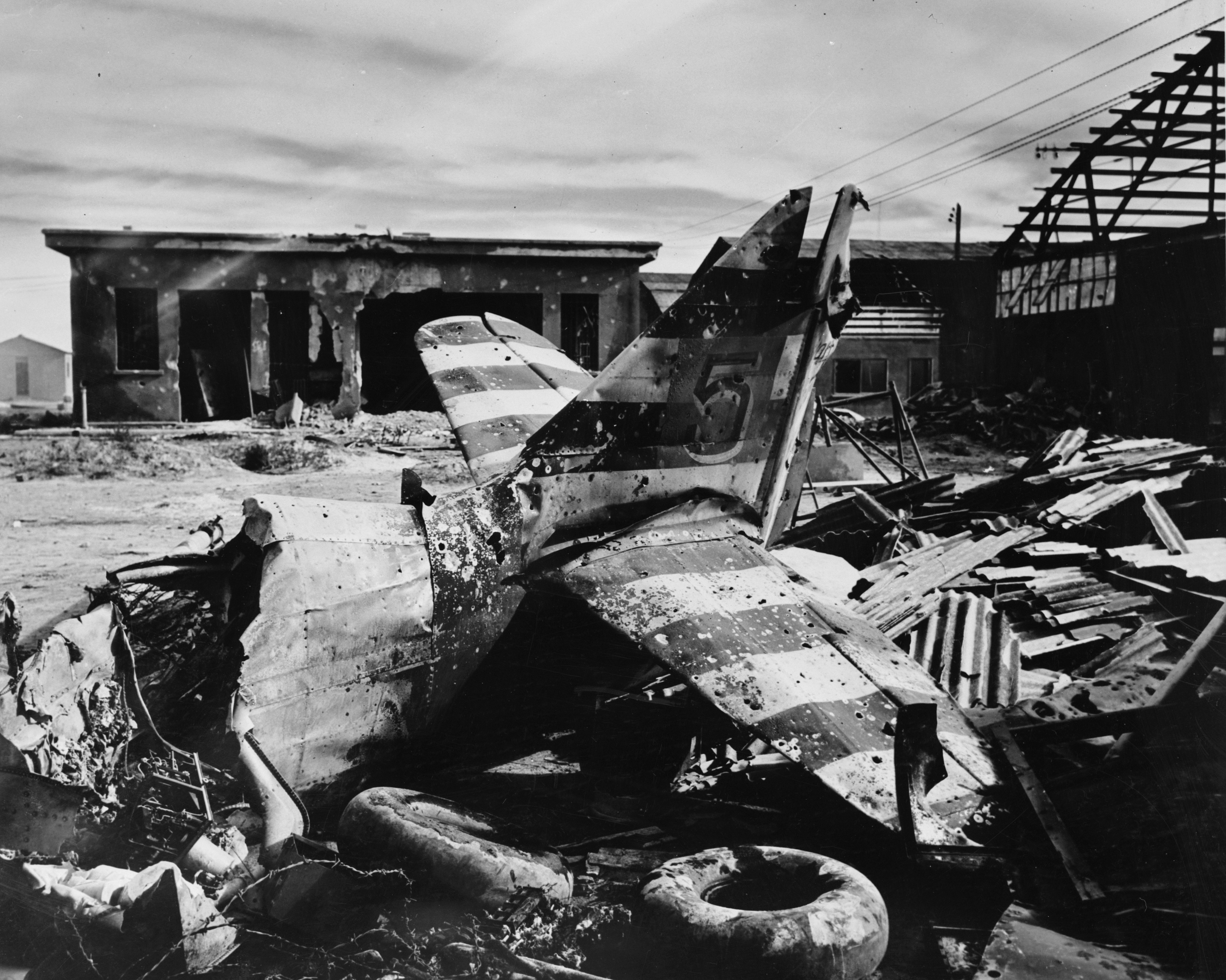
Tail section of a burned Vichy D.520 at an airbase in North Africa, 1943

By the end of the campaign, Vichy forces had lost 179 aircraft from the approximately 289 committed to the Levant. The remaining aircraft with the range to do so, evacuated to Rhodes. The known French losses of fighter aircraft were 26 in air combat and 45 in strafing and bombing actions. The Allies lost 41 planes, 27 of those shot down by French fighters. During Operation Torch (the invasion of North Africa), GC III/3 (previously known as GC I/3), was engaged in combat with the Allies over Oran. Flotille 1F saw action against the United States Navy Grumman F4F Wildcat squadron VF-41 (from the carrier USS Ranger), over Casablanca. One D.520 was among fourteen US victory claims; the only Allied losses were due to ground and friendly fire. Other Dewoitine-equipped units in North Africa such as GC II/7 or GC II/3 did not take part in the fighting. Overall, the known D.520 air strength in North Africa was 173 D.520s (143 combat ready) of GC II/3, III/3, III/6, II/7 and II/5; another 30 were in Senegal with GC II/6. The Navy had Esc 1AC and 2AC. Many D.520s were destroyed on the ground by Allied bombing. The French Air Force lost 56 aircraft, among them 13 D.520s. The Navy lost 19 D.520s. Among the 44 kills that the French scored overall, there were five losses from fighters and flak out of a squadron of eight Fairey Albacores from HMS Furious, some of which were shot down by D.520s of GC III/3.

==== Free French Dewoitines ====
A very small number of D.520s were briefly operated by Free French Forces for training purposes. Along with the three examples that had flown to Britain in June 1940, two other Dewoitines were recovered from retreating Vichy forces in Rayak, Lebanon. These D.520s were flown by pilots of the Normandie-Niemen unit before it was sent to the USSR, where they flew the Yakovlev Yak-1 that had many similarities with the French aircraft.

=== With the Allies ===
In December 1942, as French forces formerly under Vichy sided with the Allies, there were 153 D.520s left in French hands in North Africa. They flew a few patrols during the Tunisia campaign, but were considered obsolete, and their radio sets were incompatible with Allied equipment. From early 1943 on, they were relegated to training duties at the fighter school in Meknes, and progressively replaced by Supermarine Spitfires and Bell P-39 Airacobras in combat units.

During the liberation of France, a few D.520s abandoned by the Germans, were used by ad hoc units in ground attacks against the isolated German pockets of resistance on the Western coast. Around 55 such aircraft were recovered from the Luftwaffe by the rapid advance of the Allies. Commanded by former test pilot Marcel Doret, one such unit attacked German forces at Royan and Pointe de Grave, performing strafing runs upon enemy artillery positions, as well as providing air cover for Allied bombers. After 1 December 1944, the date on which the French Air Force was officially reformed, Doret's unit became G.C.II/18; it continued to operate D.520s for several months before being reequipped with Spitfires on 1 March 1945.

=== Regia Aeronautica Dewoitines ===
About 60 D.520s were acquired by the Regia Aeronautica (the Italian Air Force or RA). Italian pilots appreciated the aircraft's capabilities and Hispano-Suiza HS.404 cannon, at least by 1940–1941 standards. The first three D.520s were assigned to 2° Stormo based at the Turin-Caselle airfield, where they were used for the defence of Turin's industrial area. Other D.520s were captured in Montélimar, Orange, Istres and Aix-en-Provence.

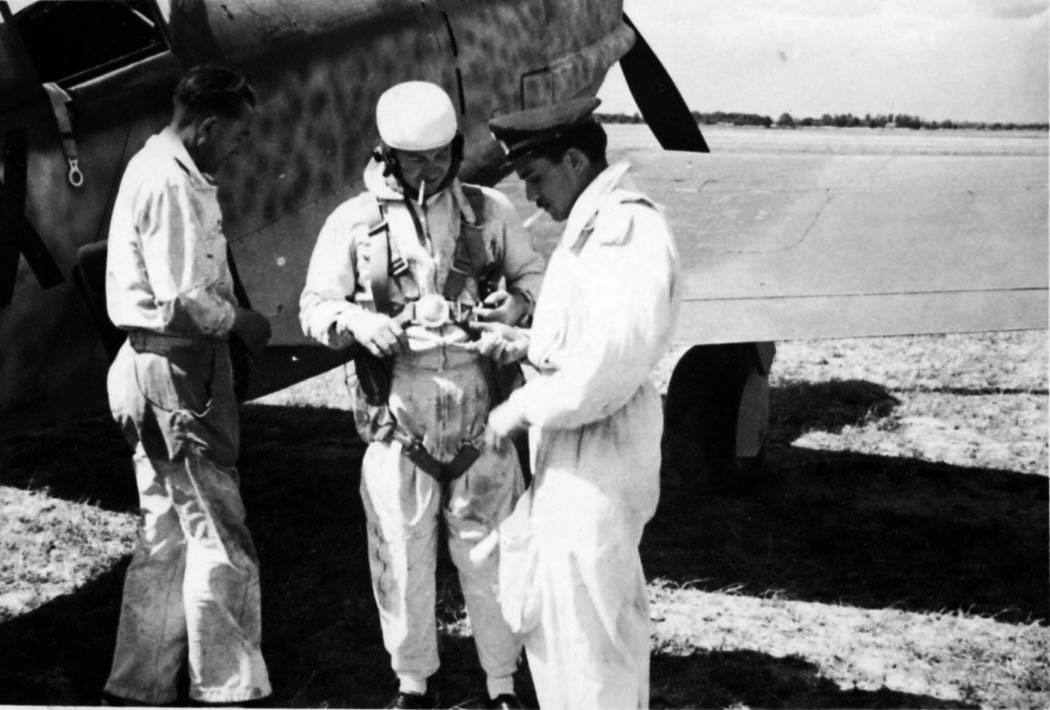
Italian ace Guido Fibbia (right) with a Regia Aeronautica D.520 c. 1943

At the beginning of 1943, the Italian ace Luigi Gorrini ferried D.520s taken as prizes of war to Italy to be used for defence. "I have collected several dozen Dewoitines from various French airfields and the Toulouse factory", he recalled later. "At the time, when we were still flying the Macchi C.200, it was a good, if not very good, machine. Compared to the Macchi 200, it was superior only in one point: its armament of the Hispano-Suiza HS 404 20 mm (0.787 in) cannon." Italian pilots liked the 20 mm (0.787 in) gun, the modern cockpit, the excellent radio set and the easy recovery from a spin but they also complained about the weak undercarriage and the small [cannon] ammunition drum capability; the ammunition was not available in quantities (the HS.404 was not compatible with Breda and Scotti 20 mm (0.787 in) guns, so everything depended on France's depots). At the end of February the 359a Squadriglia (22° Gruppo), led by Major Vittorio Minguzzi, received eight Dewoitine D.520. At that time, American B-24s frequently bombed Naples, so an effective interceptor was badly needed, and D.520s were all that were available in early 1943. The 359a Squadriglia pilots used Dewoitines with some success.

On 1 March 1943, Maggiore Minguzzi claimed a B-24 while flying a D.520. This claim was initially only claimed as a probable but was later upgraded to a confirmed. This was probably the first Italian claim using this aircraft. On 21 May 1943, the Regia Aeronautica and the Luftwaffe agreed to exchange 39 Lioré et Olivier LeO 451s, captured by the Italians at the SNCASE factory in Ambérieu-en-Bugey (Lyon), with a stock of 30 D.520s. Subsequently, in the spring and summer of 1943, the Dewoitines were used by 161° Gruppo Autonomo, based in southern Italy with 163a Squadriglia in Grottaglie, 162a Squadriglia in Crotone and 164a Squadriglia in Reggio Calabria. On 31 July 1943, the Regia Aeronautica still had 47 Dewoitines in service. After the armistice of 8 September 1943, three D.520s, previously in service with 24° Gruppo, were used by the Aeronautica Nazionale Repubblicana of the Italian Social Republic for training.

=== Other foreign users ===
German forces invading Vichy's so-called "free zone" in November 1942, captured 246 D.520s; additionally, a batch of 62 was completed under German occupation. The captured Dewoitines were to be delivered to the Axis Balkan Front, although some were used by the Luftwaffe for training purposes while 60 were transferred to Italy and 96, or 120, to the Bulgarian Air Force for use in combat. However, D.520s reached Bulgaria only in August 1943, as the fighter pilots of that country were still training on the type at Nancy with JG 107.

The following month, the first 48 Dewoitines were taken over in a ceremony on Karlovo airfield. Two months later, on 24 November, the D.520s were used in combat, when 17 out of the 60 B-24 Liberators of the 15th USAAF arrived over the capital, Sofia, to bomb it. Twenty four Dewoitines took off from Vrazhdebna base (along with 16 Bf 109G-2s from Bojourishte) and attacked the bombers and their 35 escorting P-38 Lightnings. The Bulgarian pilots claimed four American aircraft for the loss of one fighter, three more had to force land. American bombers attacked Sofia again, on 10 December 1943. That day, 31 B-24s escorted by P-38s, were intercepted by six Dewoitines of the II/6th Fighter Regiment from Vrazhdebna and 16 D.520s of the I/6th Fighter Regiment from Karlovo (along with 17 Bf 109G-2s). The Americans claimed 11 D.520s for the loss of only one P-38. The later examination of records showed that only one Dewoitine was lost during that air battle.

The Bulgarian Air Force D.520s were again up in force, to face the massive Allied air raid of 30 March 1944. To intercept the 450 bombers (B-17 Flying Fortresses, B-24s and Handley Page Halifaxes) escorted by 150 P-38s, the Bulgarians scrambled 28 Dewoitines from I./6th at Karlovo, six D.520s from II/6th at Vrazhdebna (together with 39 Bf 109G-6s and even Avia 135s). At least ten Allied aircraft (eight bombers and two P-38s) were shot down, while the Bulgarian Air Force lost five fighters and three pilots. Two more Bulgarian aircraft had to force land. During the last Allied raid on Sofia, on 17 April, the II./6th fighter scrambled seven Dewoitines (plus 16 Bf 109s), against 350 B-17s and B-24s escorted by 100 P-51 Mustangs. Bulgarian pilots, who up to that time had encountered only P-38s, mistook the P-51s for their own Bf 109s and before they realized their mistake, seven Bf 109G-6s had been shot down. That day the Bulgarian Air Force suffered the heaviest losses since the beginning of the war: nine fighters shot down and three that had to crash land. Six pilots lost their lives. By 28 September 1944, twenty days after Bulgaria joined the Allies, Dewoitines still equipped an Orlyak (Group) of the 6th Fighter regiment: I Group had a total of 17 D.520s, five under repair and 12 operational, for its three Jato (Squadrons).

Numerous sources have mentioned use of the D.520 by the Romanian Air Force, but no evidence has ever been provided. One source claims the so-called Romanian Dewoitines were, in fact, in transit to Bulgaria and only flew over Romania in order to get to their final destination. This seems the most reliable explanation, viewed against the numbers of Dewoitines actually available. Romania did however use the French Bloch MB.150.

=== Postwar service ===
After the war, the D.520s that remained in France were used as trainers; on 1 June 1945, the school base No. 704 was formed at Tours for the purpose of training pilot instructors operating, amongst other types, 17 D.520s. At the encouragement of No. 704's commanding office, one D.520 was field-modified into a two-seater configuration in late 1945, which was subsequently designated as the D.520 DC. In March 1946, after further experiments, the French Air Force ordered a further batch of 20 D.520s to be likewise converted; however, only 13 of these D.520 DC conversions were completed.

The last unit to fly the D.520 was the EPAA (Équipes de présentation de l'armée de l'air), No. 58. In their final years, the remaining examples were often unserviceable due to general wear and tear. The last flight of an operational D.520 was made on 3 September 1953 with EPAA (Équipes de présentation de l'armée de l'air). Initially, this unit had flown Yak-3s, formerly of the Normandie-Niemen fighter squadron; these were later replaced with seven D.520s, three of them being two-seaters.

== Variants ==
D.520
The main production version, sometimes designated the D.520 S (for série – production) or the D.520 C1 (for chasseur – fighter, single-seat).

=== Direct derivatives ===
In 1940, SNCAM had several projects to fit the D.520 airframe with more powerful engines. These developments were halted by the June armistice.

D.521
engine replaced by a Rolls-Royce Merlin III, one example was built, but the project was cancelled.
D.522
engine replaced by an Allison V-1710 C-1, project abandoned after the armistice (22 June 1940).
D.523
engine replaced by slightly different sub-variants of the 820 kW (1,100 hp) Hispano-Suiza 12Y-51, with Szydlowski-Planiol supercharger. D.523 Prototype was completing pre-production trials in June 1940.
D.524
Version powered by Hispano-Suiza 12Y-89ter engine. One prototype built, but it never flew.
D.525
development version of the D.523
D.530
planned version with a 1,044 kW (1,400 hp) Rolls-Royce Merlin or a 1,342 kW (1,800 hp) Hispano-Suiza 12Y.

=== Related prewar projects ===
HD.780
Floatplane derivative of the D.520, one prototype built, but it never flew, the development was cancelled with the armistice.
D.790
Carrier-borne derivative project, none built.
D.550
Unarmed aircraft built for speed record attempt, with an airframe loosely based on the D.520, but using weight-saving construction techniques. One example was built.
D.551 and D.552
Military developments of the D.550. 12 examples were built, but none flew. The development was resumed in 1941, but was quickly terminated by the Germans.

=== Post-armistice developments ===
Several projects were initiated after the June 1940 armistice. They were all terminated with the German occupation of Southern France in November 1942.

D.520 amélioré
Single production D.520 experimentally fitted with minor improvements to improve top speed with an unchanged engine.
D.520 Z
D.520 airframe with 12Z engine and minor improvements. One example was built. The development resumed after the war (as SE.520Z), but was eventually cancelled in 1949.
M.520 T
Different airframe loosely based on the D.520. None built.

=== Postwar derivative ===
D.520 DC (double commande – dual control)
Two-seat trainer conversion, at least 13 built.

== Markings ==
Apart from the first prototype and postwar examples, D.520s sported the usual French camouflage of dark blue-grey, khaki, and dark brown with light blue-grey undersurfaces. The camouflage pattern was not standardized. National markings were the standard light-blue-white-red roundels on the wingtips, as well as on the rear fuselage, and the rudder flag.

Specific markings were applied during the Vichy era, consisting of white outlined fuselage roundels with a white fuselage stripe, and from mid-1941 on, the infamous "slave's pajamas" with red and yellow stripes on the engine cowling and tail surfaces.

== Operators ==
Main operators

Kingdom of Bulgaria

- Bulgarian Air Force

France

- French Air Force
- Aéronautique navale

Vichy France

- Vichy French Air Force

Free France

- Free French Air Force

Nazi Germany

- Luftwaffe

Kingdom of Italy

- Regia Aeronautica

Intended operators

Kingdom of Romania

Royal Romanian Air Force

== Surviving aircraft ==
- n°603 – D.520 on display at the Conservatoire de l’air et de l’espace d'Aquitaine in Bordeaux–Mérignac.
- n°650 – D.520 under restoration at the Musée National de la Marine in Rochefort.
- n°862 – D.520 on display at the Musée de l’air et de l’espace. It is painted as n°277, which was used by GC III/6 in June 1940.

== Specifications (Dewoitine D.520C.1) ==
3-view drawing of Dewoitine D.520

Data from Le Dewoitine D.520, The Dewoitine D.520

General characteristics

- Crew: One
- Length: 8.6 m (28 ft 3 in)
- Wingspan: 10.2 m (33 ft 6 in)
- Height: 2.57 m (8 ft 5 in)
- Wing area: 15.87 m^{2} (170.8 sq ft)
- Empty weight: 2,123 kg (4,680 lb)
- Gross weight: 2,677 kg (5,902 lb)
- Max takeoff weight: 2,785 kg (6,140 lb)
- Powerplant: 1 × Hispano-Suiza 12Y-49 V-12 liquid-cooled piston engine, 710 kW (950 hp)
- Propellers: 3-bladed Chauvière type 3918, 3 m (9 ft 10 in) diameter pneumatically operated variable-pitch propeller

Performance

- Maximum speed: 560 km/h (350 mph, 300 kn)
- Range: 1,250 km (780 mi, 670 nmi)
- Service ceiling: 10,000 m (33,000 ft)
- Rate of climb: 14.3 m/s (2,810 ft/min)
- Wing loading: 167 kg/m^{2} (34 lb/sq ft)
- Power/mass: 0.257 kW/kg (0.156 hp/lb)

Armament

- Guns:
  - 1 × 20 mm (0.787 in) Hispano-Suiza HS.404 (60-round drum) cannon
  - 4 × 7.5 mm (0.295 in) MAC 1934 (675 rpg) machine guns

== See also ==
Aircraft of comparable role, configuration, and era

- Arsenal VG.33
- Curtiss P-40
- Hawker Hurricane
- Heinkel He 100
- Lavochkin LaGG-3
- Kawasaki Ki-61 Hien
- Macchi C.202 Folgore
- Messerschmitt Bf 109
- Mikoyan-Gurevich MiG-3
- Reggiane Re.2001 Falco II
- Rogožarski IK-3
- Supermarine Spitfire
- Yakovlev Yak-1

Related lists

- List of aircraft of the French Air Force
- List of aircraft of World War II

== Bibliography ==
- Angelucci, Enzo and Paolo Matricardi. World Aircraft: World War II, Volume I (Sampson Low Guides). Maidenhead, UK: Sampson Low, 1978. ISBN 0-562-00096-8.
- L'aviazione encyclopedia (The Illustrated Encyclopedia of Aircraft). London: Aerospace Publishing /De Agostini, 1986.
- Avions Militaires 1919–1939 – Profiles et Histoire. Paris: Connaissance de l’Histoire Hachette, 1979.
- Bączkowski, W. Dewoitine D.520 (in Polish). Warsaw, Poland: Books International, 1998.
- Belcarz, Bartłomiej. Dewoitine D 520. Sandomierz, Poland/Redbourn, UK: Mushroom Model Publications, 2005. ISBN 83-89450-09-7.
- Botquin, Gérard (November 1976). "Un Dewoitine 520: revolera-t-il?" [Dewoitine D 520: Will it Revolve?]. Le Fana de l'Aviation (in French) (84): 14–16. ISSN 0757-4169.
- Breffort, Dominique and André Jouineau. French Aircraft from 1939 to 1942, Volume 2: From Dewoitine to Potez. Paris: Histoire & Collections, 2005. ISBN 2-915239-49-5.
- Brindley, John F. French Fighters of World War Two, Volume One. Windsor, UK: Hylton Lacy Publishers Ltd., 1971. ISBN 0-85064-015-6.
- Brown, J. D. (1968). Carrier Operations in World War II: The Royal Navy. London: Ian Allan.
- Brown, Russell. Desert Warriors: Australian P-40 Pilots at War in the Middle East and North Africa, 1941–1943. Maryborough, Australia: Banner Books, 1983. ISBN 1-875593-22-5.
- "Caccia Assalto 5." Dimensione Cielo Aerei italiani nella 2° guerra mondiale (in Italian). Rome: Edizioni Bizzarri, 1972.
- Caruana, Richard. "Allez le Gosse: The Dewoitine D.520." Scale Aviation Modeller International, Volume 4, Issue 11, October 1998.
- Danel, Raymond. The Dewoitine 520 (Aircraft in Profile number 135). Windsor, Berkshire, UK: Profile Publications Ltd., 1971 (reprint from 1966).
- Danel, Raymond and Jean Cuny. Docavia n°4: le Dewoitine D.520 (in French with English translation). Paris: Editions Larivière, 1966.
- Dewoitine D 520 (bilingual French/English: various authors). Brussels, Belgium: DTU, 1997. ISBN 2-912749-00-X.
- Ehrengardt, Christian-Jacques. Les avions français au combat: le Dewoitine D.520 (in French). Paris: Aéro-Editions, 2004.
- Garello, Giancarlo (June 1999). "Les Dewoitine D.520 italiens" [Italian Dewoitine D.520s]. Avions: Toute l'aéronautique et son histoire (in French) (75): 16–23. ISSN 1243-8650.
- Garello, Giancarlo (July 1999). "Les Dewoitine D.520 italiens au combat" [Italian Dewoitine D.520s in Combat]. Avions: Toute l'Aéronautique et son histoire (in French) (76): 18–29. ISSN 1243-8650.
- Garello, Giancarlo (December 1999). "Courrier des Lecteurs" [Readers' Letters]. Avions: Toute l'Aéronautique et son histoire (in French) (81): 4. ISSN 1243-8650.
- Green, William. War Planes of the Second World War, Volume One; Fighters. London: Macdonald & Co.(Publishers) Ltd., 1960 (10th impression 1972). ISBN 0-356-01445-2.
- Herington, John. Second World War Volume III – Air War Against Germany and Italy, 1939–1943 Canberra: Australian War Memorial (Australian official history), First edition, 1954.
- Jackson, Robert. Aircraft of World War II: Development – Weaponry – Specifications. Enderby, Leicester, UK: Amber Books, 2003. ISBN 1-85605-751-8.
- Marchand, Patrick. Dewoitine D.520 (Ailes de Gloire nr. 8) (in French). Le Muy, France: Les éditions Along, 2002. ISBN 2-914403-11-9.
- Mombeek, Eric (May 2001). "Les trésors de Cazaux" [The Treasures of Cazaux]. Avions: Toute l'Aéronautique et son histoire (in French) (98): 44–47. ISSN 1243-8650.
- Neulen, Hans Werner. In the Skies of Europe. Ramsbury, Marlborough, UK: The Crowood Press, 2000. ISBN 1-86126-799-1.
- Osché, Philippe (June 2000). "In mémoriam" [In Memory]. Avions: Toute l'Aéronautique et son histoire (in French) (87): 8–12. ISSN 1243-8650.
- Pelletier, Alain. French Fighters of World War II in Action (Aircraft Number 180). Carrollton, TX: Squadron/Signal Publications, Inc., 2002. ISBN 0-89747-440-6.
- Tillman, Barrett. Wildcat Aces of World War 2. Oxford, UK: Osprey Publishing. 1995. ISBN 1-85532-486-5.
- Thompson, J. Steve with Peter C. Smith. Air Combat Manoeuvres. Hersham, Surrey, UK: Ian Allan Publishing, 2008. ISBN 978-1-903223-98-7.
- Winchester, Jim. "Dewoitine D.520." Fighters: The World's Finest Combat Aircraft: 1914 to the Present Day. Bath, UK: Parragon Publishing, 2003. ISBN 1-4054-3843-6.
