= SNCAM =

Société nationale des constructions aéronautiques du Midi
- Industry: Aerospace, defence
- Predecessor: Dewoitine
- Founded: France (c. April 1, 1937)
- Defunct: 1941
- Fate: Acquired
- Successor: SNCASE
- Headquarters: Toulouse, France
- Products: Aircraft

Société nationale des constructions aéronautiques du Midi (abbreviated SNCAM) was a state-owned French aircraft manufacturer. The company was formed following the resolution of the 1936 general strike of French heavy industry, when the government of Léon Blum introduced an act to nationalize the French war industry on or before April 1, 1937. The former Dewoitine aircraft company was placed under government control, and renamed SNCAM. The company had been formed as one of six state-owned Société Nationales in the 1936 nationalistation of military industries, in late 1940 these were re-organised and SNCAM was absorbed by SNCASE. SNCASE later merged with SNCASO to form Sud Aviation. Through subsequent mergers, SNCAM's former holdings are now part of the Airbus group.

== Products ==
- Dewoitine D.520
