= Kergrist-Moëlou =

Kergrist-Moëlou Kergrist-Moeloù
- Commune
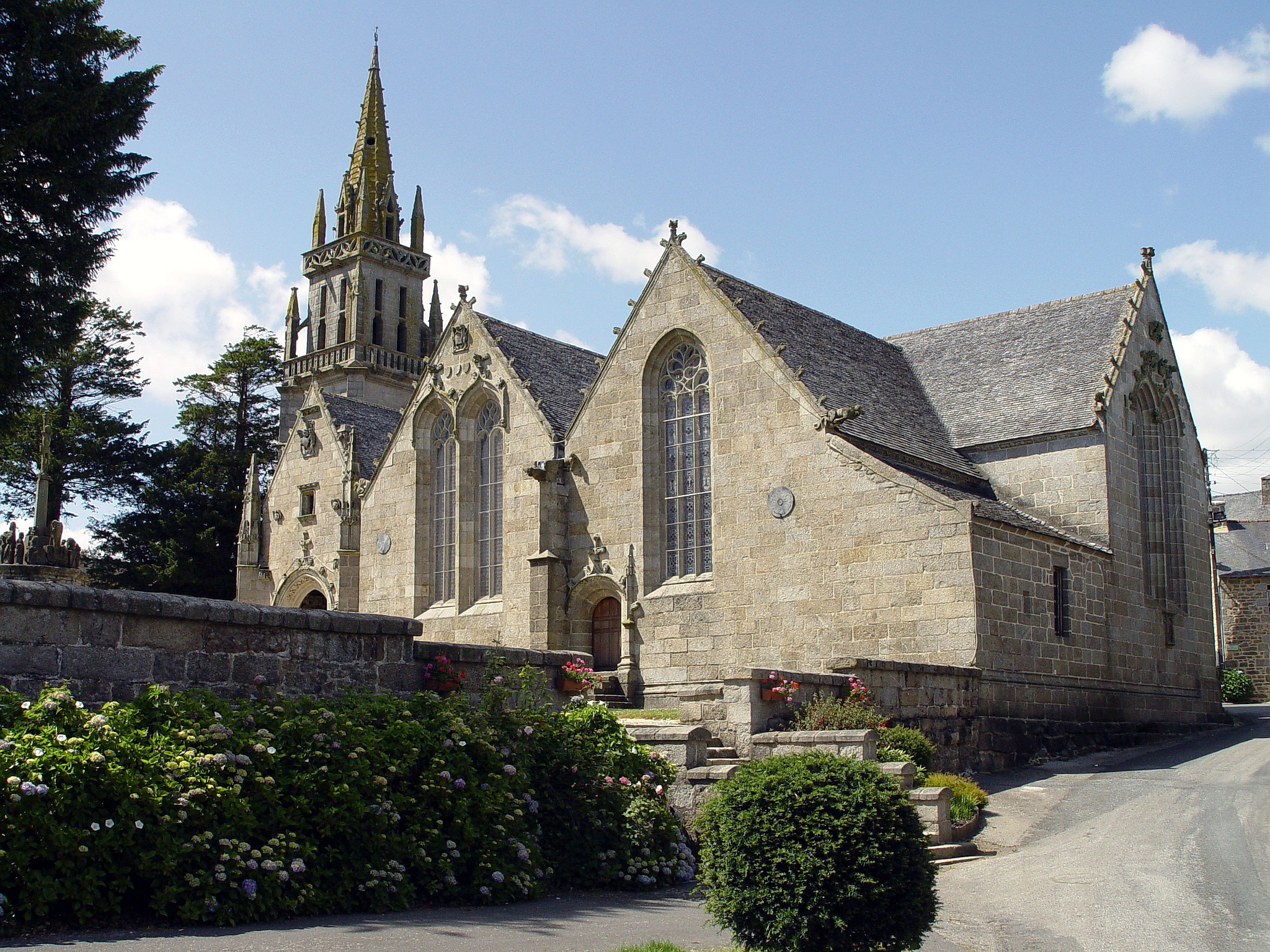
- The church of Kergrist-Moëlou
- Location of Kergrist-Moëlou
- Location within France Location within Brittany
- Coordinates: 48°18′37″N 3°18′59″W
- Country: France
- Region: Brittany
- Department: Côtes-d'Armor
- Arrondissement: Guingamp
- Canton: Rostrenen
- Intercommunality: Kreiz-Breizh

Government
  - Mayor (2020–2026): Alain Cupcic
- Area^{1}: 47.16 km^{2} (18.21 sq mi)
- Highest elevation: 302 m (991 ft)
- Lowest elevation: 153 m (502 ft)
- Population (2023): 629
  - Density: 13.3/km^{2} (34.5/sq mi)
- Time zone: UTC+01:00 (CET)
  - Summer (DST): UTC+02:00 (CEST)
- INSEE/Postal code: 22087 /22110
- ^{1} French Land Register data, which excludes lakes, ponds, glaciers > 1 km^{2} (0.386 sq mi or 247 acres) and river estuaries.

Kergrist-Moëlou (French pronunciation: [kɛʁɡʁist mwelu]; Breton: Kergrist-Moeloù) is a commune in the Côtes-d'Armor department of Brittany in northwestern France.

== Population ==
Historical population
Year	Pop.	±% p.a.
1968	1,092	—
1975	854	−3.45%
1982	722	−2.37%
1990	685	−0.66%
1999	692	+0.11%
2007	663	−0.53%
2012	652	−0.33%
2017	657	+0.15%
2023	629	−0.72%
Source: INSEE

Inhabitants of Kergrist-Moëlou are called kergristois in French.

== See also ==
- Communes of the Côtes-d'Armor department
- The Calvary at Kergrist-Moëlou
