= Latham E-5 =

General information
- Type: Marine patrol biplane flying boat
- National origin: France
- Manufacturer: Société Industrielle de Caudebec-en-Caux
- Designer: Jean Latham with Weber and Levavasseur
- Number built: 1

History
- First flight: Before 14 August 1925

The Latham E-5 was a large French Naval four engine biplane flying boat, flown in 1925. It was successfully tested but only one was built.

== Design ==
The Latham E-5 was the largest of Latham's three big biplane flying boats. The earlier Trimotor and rather similar HB.5 both had only slightly shorter span upper wing spans but much smaller lower wings; the E-5 was an equal span biplane and as a result had over 40% more wing area. It also had 60% more power, allowing a 50% increase in gross weight. It was developed by Jean Latham together with Weber and Levavasseur.

Its wooden framed, two spar, rectangular plan wings had the same airfoil section along the span; the upper and lower planes had the same span and chord. They formed an unstaggered, 3.5 m (11 ft 6 in) interplane gap, two bay structure braced with two parallel pairs of vertical interplane struts on each side. These struts had wooden box cores and were enclosed in duralumin sheet, airfoil section fairings. The E-5 had a 6.4 m (21 ft 0 in) span centre section without dihedral and outer sections with about 2° of dihedral. Inverted V-struts braced the centre of the upper wing to the upper fuselage and the engine mounting frames joined the upper and lower wings at the ends of the centre sections. Ailerons were fitted only on the upper wing and occupied about one third of the span.

The E-5 was powered by four 400 hp (300 kW) Lorraine 12D water-cooled V-12 engines, mounted as two push-pull pairs in two single nacelles. Each was positioned midway between the wings; the front ends of the nacelles projected well beyond the wing leading edge but the pusher configuration members of the pair drove their propellers between the wings a little aft of mid-chord.

The wooden, flat sided fuselage of the E-5 was 20 m (65 ft 7 in) long and, at its maximum, 3.4 m (11 ft 2 in) wide and 2.3 m (7 ft 7 in) deep, with a single step, soft chine planing hull. On water, the E-5 was laterally stabilized by a pair of flat bottomed floats, wing mounted on struts below the outer interplane struts. The open, side-by-side cockpit was some 4 m (13 ft 1 in) forward of the wing and close to the gunner/bombardier's position in the extreme nose. There were two more cockpits, separate though side-by-side and just behind the trailing edge, for the navigator and another gunner/bombardier.

The end of the fuselage curved up to a low, curved step which supported a biplane, constant chord horizontal tail with balanced elevators on its upper and lower planes. The lower elevator was in two parts with a central V-shaped cut-out. Between the planes there was a central fin which carried a rounded rudder that reached down to the keel and worked in the elevator gap, together with two mid-span, finless rudders, which were approximately trapezoidal in shape to allow elevator movement.

== Development ==
The precise date of the E-5's first flight is not known but on 14 August 1925 tests at Caudebec-en-Caux were successfully conducted in the presence of officials from the Service technique de l'aéronautique (STAé). Robert Duhamel was the test pilot, assisted by his brother Amédé who was chief engineer at Latham's works. The later history of the sole E-5 is not recorded in the major French aviation journals of the time.

== Specifications ==
Data from Les Ailes, 27 August 1925 All performance figures recorded at the gross weight below

General characteristics

- Length: 21 m (68 ft 11 in)
- Wingspan: 33.50 m (109 ft 11 in)
- Height: 6.82 m (22 ft 5 in)
- Wing area: 255 m^{2} (2,740 sq ft)
- Empty weight: 7,800 kg (17,196 lb)
- Gross weight: 10,950 kg (24,141 lb)
- Powerplant: 4 × Lorraine 12D water-cooled V-12, 300 kW (400 hp) each
- Propellers: 2-bladed

Performance

- Maximum speed: 160 km/h (99 mph, 86 kn)
- Service ceiling: 3,300 m (10,800 ft)
- Time to altitude: 2,000 m (6,600 ft) in 21 min

== Bibliography ==
- Passingham, Malcolm (November–December 1999). "Latham's 'Boats: Pictorial History of the Designs of Jean Latham". Air Enthusiast (84): 22–27. ISSN 0143-5450.
