= Potez IX =

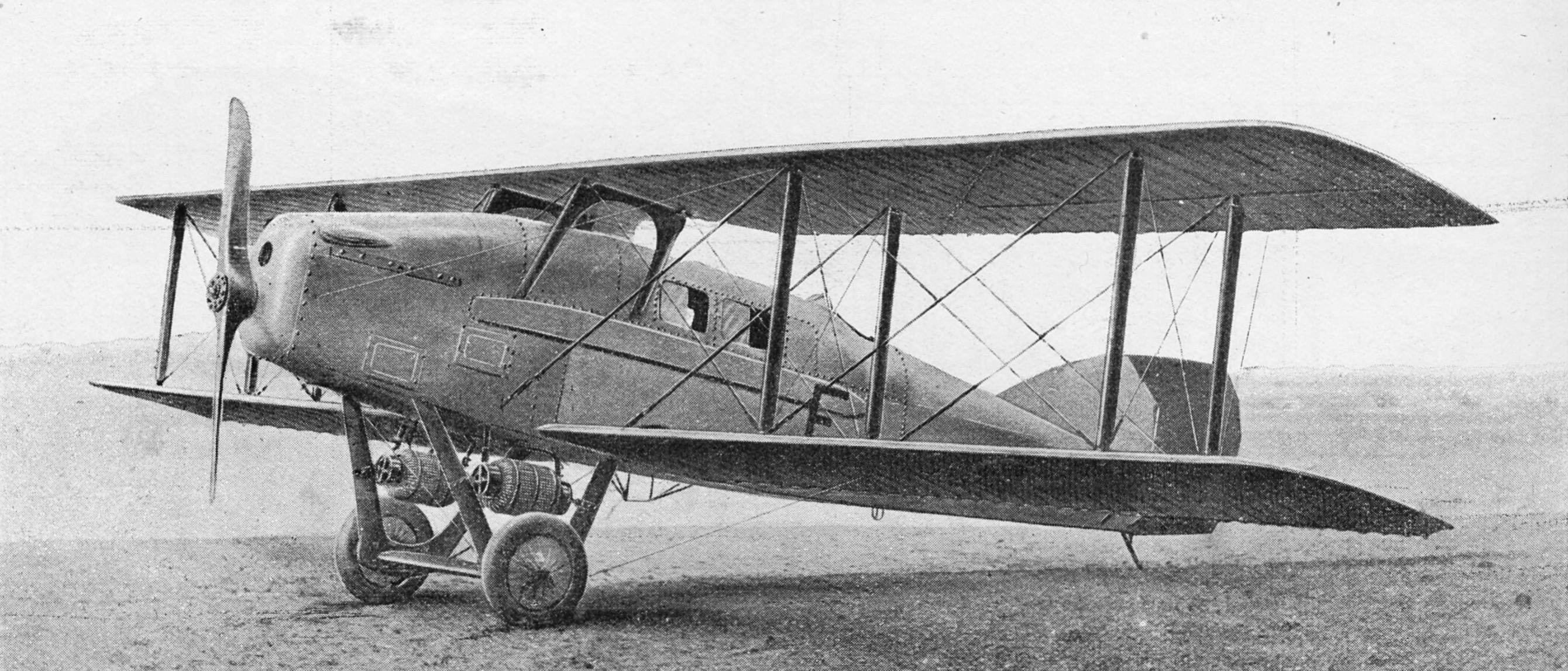

General information
- Type: Airliner
- National origin: France
- Manufacturer: Potez
- Number built: 30

History
- First flight: 1920
- Developed from: SEA IV

The Potez IX was an early airliner produced in France in the 1920s, a further development of the SEA IV that Henry Potez had co-designed during the First World War.

== Design and development ==
The design mated an entirely new fuselage to the wing and tail structures of the earlier military aircraft. This fuselage was very deep, nearly filling the interplane gap, and carried within it a fully enclosed cabin with seating for four passengers. The nose area was carefully streamlined with curved aluminium, but other aspects of the construction were conventional for the day; wooden structures skinned in plywood (the passenger cabin) or fabric (the rest of the aircraft). The pilot sat in an open cockpit aft of the cabin.

The prototype flew in 1920, and was followed by around thirty production examples that differed from it in having a larger tail fin and rudder. The Compagnie générale transaérienne operated Potez IXs on cross-channel air services between Paris and London. The Compagnie Franco-Roumaine de Navigation Aérienne flew these on routes linking Paris to Warsaw via Strasbourg and Prague, and from Paris to Budapest via Strasbourg and Vienna, later extending its services to Bucharest and Constantinople. Franco-Roumaine, and its successor airline CIDNA operated the Potez IX until 1928.

The Potez IX S, a one-off modified version with wings of larger area, flew in the Grand Prix de l'Aéro Club de France in June 1921 with Gustave Douchy at the controls. Douchy was disqualified in the third stage of the competition.

== Specifications ==
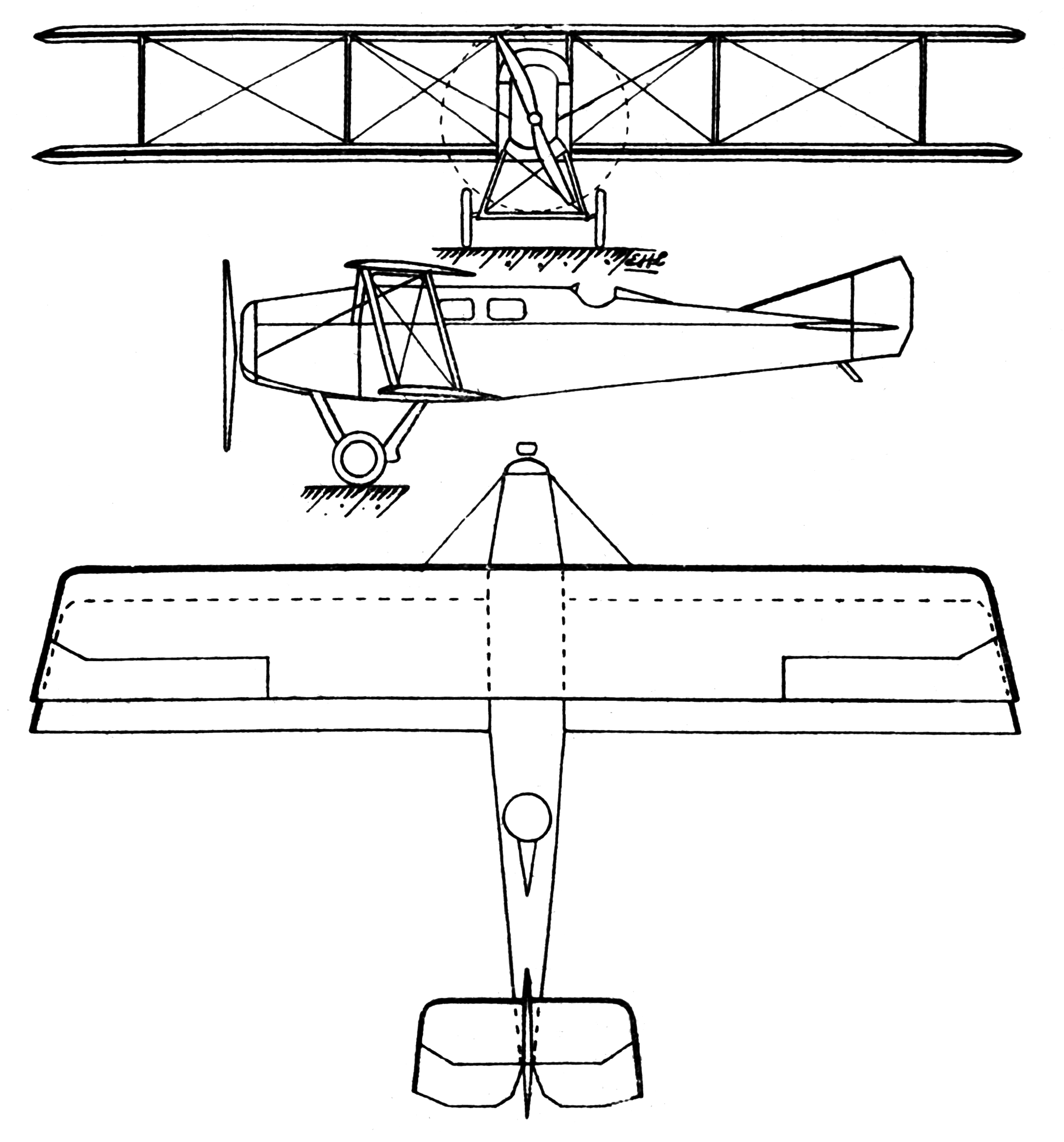
Potez IX 3-view Drawing from Les Ailes December 29,1921

Data from "The Paris Aero Show 1921" 22 December 1921, p.842

General characteristics

- Crew: One pilot
- Capacity: 4 passengers
- Length: 9.80 m (32 ft 2 in)
- Wingspan: 14.00 m (46 ft 0 in)
- Height: 3.12 m (10 ft 3 in)
- Wing area: 46.0 m^{2} (495 sq ft)
- Empty weight: 1,250 kg (2,750 lb)
- Gross weight: 2,050 kg (2,511 lb)
- Powerplant: 1 × Lorraine-Dietrich 12Da , 280 kW (370 hp)

Performance

- Maximum speed: 200 km/h (125 mph, 109 kn)
- Service ceiling: 6,100 m (20,000 ft)
- Rate of climb: 4.2 m/s (820 ft/min)
