= Latham L.1 =

General information
- Type: Schneider Trophy racing aircraft
- National origin: France
- Manufacturer: Société Latham
- Number built: 2

History
- First flight: 1923

The Latham L.1 was a French competitor in the 1923 Schneider Trophy race. It was a twin engine, biplane flying boat, built by Société Latham.

== Design and development ==
The Latham L.1 was a single bay biplane with a single, faired interplane strut on each side. There was slight stagger. The gap between the upper and lower wings was large, about 2.5 m (8.2 ft) or 20% of the span. This allowed the engines, a pair of 220 kW (300 hp) Lorraine 12D V-12s mounted in push-pull configuration, to be mounted between the wings. Enclosed in a continuous, streamlined cowling, they were strut-mounted from below on four pairs of longitudinal V-struts and another four smaller pairs of inverted V-struts from their upper side formed a cabane which braced the upper wing centre-section. The engines were cooled with cylindrical Lamblin radiators on each forward engine support strut. The lower wing was mounted on top of the fuselage.

The upper and lower wings were rectangular in plan and the same size, both set with slight dihedral. Rectangular plan ailerons, extending to the tips, were fitted on both wings and were externally connected. Stabilising floats were fitted directly to the lower wing underside below the interplane struts.

The L.1 had a single-step hull, built entirely of duralumin and with a slightly concave V-section planing bottom. The fuselage sides were a little rounded, flatter than the upper decking. The pilot's open cockpit was ahead of the wing leading edges but below the forward engine. At the rear the upper fuselage swept upwards into the fin, which carried the horizontal tail at its top. The latter was straight-edged with angled tips, its tailplane braced to the fuselage with a rearward-leaning strut on each side. The rudder, which worked in a cut-out between the elevators, was rounded and had a comma-style balance that operated above the tailplane.

== Operational history ==
The 1923 Schneider Cup race was held off Portsmouth over the Solent between Cowes and Selsey and flown on 28 September after taxiing and mooring tests the day before. They French team had two Latham L.1s (the second was not termed L.2 in contemporary reports, despite the accounts in some modern sources), one (race no. 11, F-ESEJ) to compete with Duhamel as pilot and the other as a reserve. They also had a pair of CAMS 38s. Latham L.1 No.11 passed the 27 September tests without incident but engine problems prevented it reaching the starting line the next day and the only French competitor was one of the CAMS 38s, which dropped out after one lap. The race was won by the US with their Curtiss CR-3 floatplanes in first and second places.

== Specifications ==
Data from Les Ailes, November 1923

General characteristics

- Crew: One
- Length: 11 m (36 ft 1 in)
- Wingspan: 12.40 m (40 ft 8 in)
- Height: 4.27 m (14 ft 0 in)
- Wing area: 50 m^{2} (540 sq ft)
- Airfoil: Göttingen 416
- Empty weight: 2,200 kg (4,850 lb)
- Gross weight: 2,700 kg (5,952 lb)
- Powerplant: 2 × Lorraine 12D water-cooled V12, 300 kW (400 hp) each
- Propellers: 2-bladed

Performance

- Maximum speed: 260 km/h (160 mph, 140 kn)
- Time to altitude: 20 min to 4,000 m (13,000 ft)

== Bibliography ==
- Passingham, Malcolm (November–December 1999). "Latham's 'Boats: Pictorial History of the Designs of Jean Latham". Air Enthusiast (84): 22–27. ISSN 0143-5450.
