= CA71 =

CA71 or CA-71 may refer to:

- California State Route 71, a highway in the US state of California
- Caproni Ca.71, an Italian fighter
- Dongfeng CA71, a midsize goldteeth car
- Inazawa Station, a railway station in Inazawa, Aichi, Japan (station code CA71)
