= SEA IV =

World War I era French aircraft

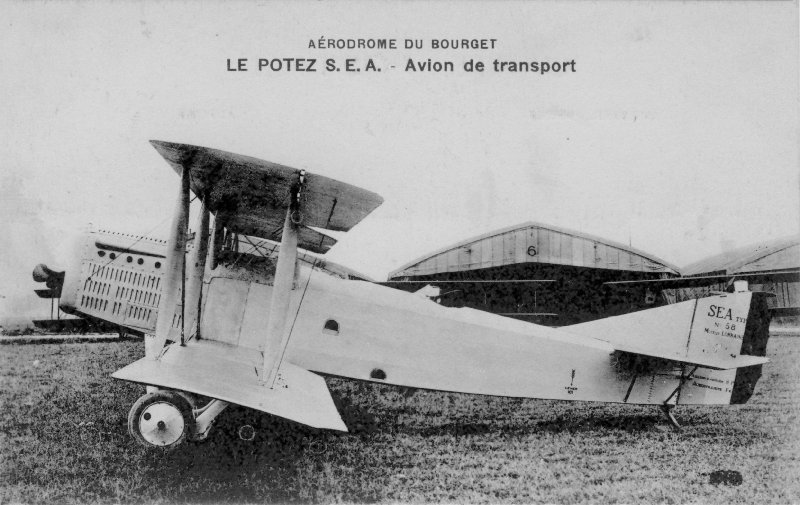

General information
- Type: Fighter
- Manufacturer: Société d'Etudes Aéronautiques (SEA)
- Designer: Henry Potez, Louis Coroller, and Marcel Bloch
- Number built: 115

History
- First flight: 1918

The SEA IV was a French two-seat military aircraft of World War I and the immediate post-war era.

== Development ==
The SEA IV was designed and built in 1917 by Henry Potez, Louis Coroller, and Marcel Bloch. It was a derivative of their previous SEA II design, equipped with a more powerful Lorraine engine of 261 kW (350 hp). It made its first flight during the first quarter of 1918, probably near Plessis-Belleville. It was initially tested by Gustave Douchy, a flying ace of 9 victories, then by the pilots of the Centre d'essais en Vol at Villacoublay. The "Ministère de l'Armement et des Fabrications de guerre" (Ministry of Armament and War Production) soon placed an order for 1,000 machines, making the SEA IV the first Dassault-designed aircraft to reach production.

== Operational history ==
On August 24, 1918, General Duval, commander of Aéronautique at General Headquarters foresaw the need for two variants to equip the escadrilles at the beginning of 1919: the SEA IV A2 for observation and the SEA IV C2 for fighting. In October, General Headquarters ordered the commissioning of a flotilla to operate these aircraft, and therefore required production to reach 200 planes per month during the first quarter of 1919, to have a force of 400 on hand by April 1.

The Armistice, however, meant that the initial order of 1,000 was cancelled, and in the end, only 115 examples were built. These C2s were used for a number of years by several escadrilles in the "Regiments d'Aviation" at Le Bourget.

A further 25 were built by Aéroplanes Henry Potez as the Potez VII, a luxury touring aircraft, and one further example formed the basis of a racing aircraft.

== Variants ==
SEA IV
Basic production variant
SEA IV P.M.
A long-distance aircraft with additional fuel tanks giving an endurance of 6 hours.
SEA IV floatplane
Under construction at the time of the Armistice in November 1918

== Operators ==
France

== Specifications (SEA IV C2) ==
Data from French aircraft of the First World War, Aviafrance:SEA IV

General characteristics

- Crew: 2
- Length: 8.5 m (27 ft 11 in)
- Wingspan: 12 m (39 ft 4 in)
- Height: 3 m (9 ft 10 in)
- Wing area: 36.8 m^{2} (396 sq ft)
- Empty weight: 1,040 kg (2,293 lb)
- Gross weight: 1,620 kg (3,571 lb)
- Powerplant: 1 × Lorraine-Dietrich 12Da V-12 water-cooled piston engine, 280 kW (370 hp)
- Propellers: 2-bladed wooden fixed-pitch propeller

Performance

- Maximum speed: 218 km/h (135 mph, 118 kn) at sea level

215 km/h (134 mph; 116 kn) at 1,000 m (3,300 ft)
210 km/h (130 mph; 110 kn) at 2,000 m (6,600 ft)
206 km/h (128 mph; 111 kn) at 3,000 m (9,800 ft)
203 km/h (126 mph; 110 kn) at 4,000 m (13,000 ft)
197 km/h (122 mph; 106 kn) at 5,000 m (16,000 ft)

- Range: 700 km (430 mi, 380 nmi)
- Endurance: 2.25 hours
- Service ceiling: 7,400 m (24,300 ft)
- Time to altitude: 1,000 m (3,300 ft) in 3 minutes 1 second

2,000 m (6,600 ft) in 6 minutes 18 seconds
3,000 m (9,800 ft) in 10 minutes 45 seconds
4,000 m (13,000 ft) in 16 minutes
5,000 m (16,000 ft) in 23 minutes 29 seconds

Armament

- 1 × fixed forward-firing synchronised 7.70 mm (.303 in) Vickers machine gun
- 2 × 7.70 mm (.303 in) Lewis guns on a flexible T.O.3 mount for the observer

== See also ==
Related lists

- List of military aircraft of France
- List of fighter aircraft

== Bibliography ==
- Coroller, Jean-Louis (December 1997). "Les Avions S.E.A.: ou la préhistoire des Avions Marcel Bloch et des Avions Henry Potez" [The Aircraft of S.E.A., or the Prehistory of the Marcel Bloch and Henry Potez Aircraft Companies]. Avions: Toute l'aéronautique et son histoire (in French) (57): 35–41. ISSN 1243-8650.
