= CA70 =

CA70 or CA-70 may refer to:

- California State Route 70, a highway in the US state of California
- Kiyosu Station, a railway station in Inazawa, Aichi, Japan (station code CA70)
- Caproni Ca.70, an Italian biplane
