= Potez SEA VII =

1910s French airliner

SEA VII
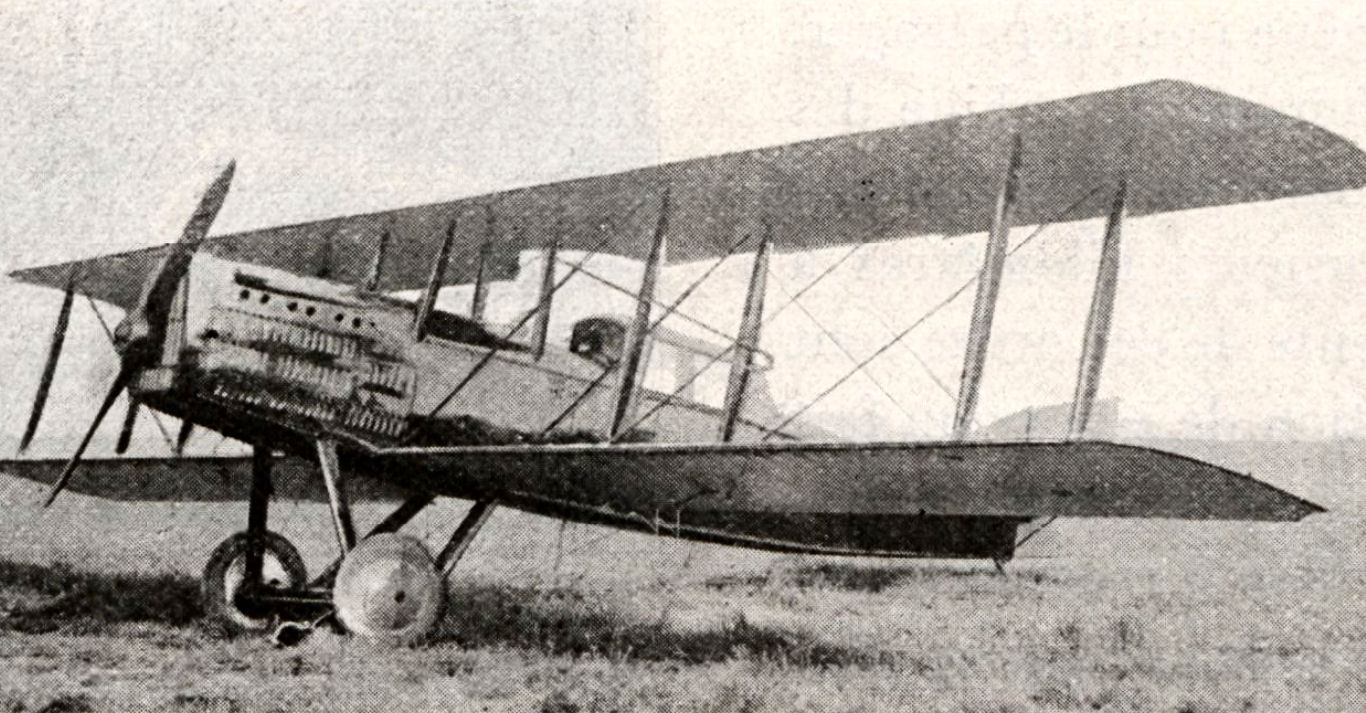

General information
- Type: Airliner
- National origin: France
- Manufacturer: Potez
- Primary user: Cie Franco-Roumaine
- Number built: ca. 25

History
- First flight: 1919
- Developed from: SEA IV

The Potez SEA VII, otherwise known simply as the Potez VII, was an early airliner developed in France shortly after the First World War.

== Design and development ==
The SEA VII was a civil version of the SEA IV military aircraft that Henry Potez had developed with Louis Coroller and Marcel Bloch as the Société d'Etudes Aéronautiques. With the end of hostilities, the French military cancelled its orders for the SEA IV and the company dissolved. Potez, however, believed that the design had potential in peacetime and founded Aéroplanes Henry Potez in 1919 to refurbish war-surplus machines for civil use. This soon led to a revision of the design as the SEA VII. This differed from its predecessor in having an enclosed cabin for two passengers occupying the rear fuselage. The wings were enlarged to reduce their loading and therefore to allow for slower, gentler landings than the military aircraft had been capable of making.

Cie Franco-Roumaine purchased twenty-five examples to use on services to Eastern European destinations during the 1920s.

== Operators ==
Iran

- Imperial Iranian Air Force

== Specifications ==
Data from aviafrance.com

General characteristics

- Crew: 1 pilot
- Capacity: 2 passengers
- Length: 8.50 m (27 ft 11 in)
- Wingspan: 14.00 m (45 ft 11 in)
- Height: 3.00 m (9 ft 10 in)
- Wing area: 44.0 m^{2} (473 sq ft)
- Empty weight: 1,050 kg (2,310 lb)
- Gross weight: 1,650 kg (3,630 lb)
- Powerplant: 1 × Lorraine-Dietrich 12Da , 280 kW (370 hp)

Performance

- Cruise speed: 170 km/h (110 mph, 96 kn)
