= Robert Delandre =

French sculptor

Robert Delandre (6 October 1879, Elbeuf - 2 June 1961, Paris) was a French sculptor. He was a student of Alexandre Falguière and Denys Puech.

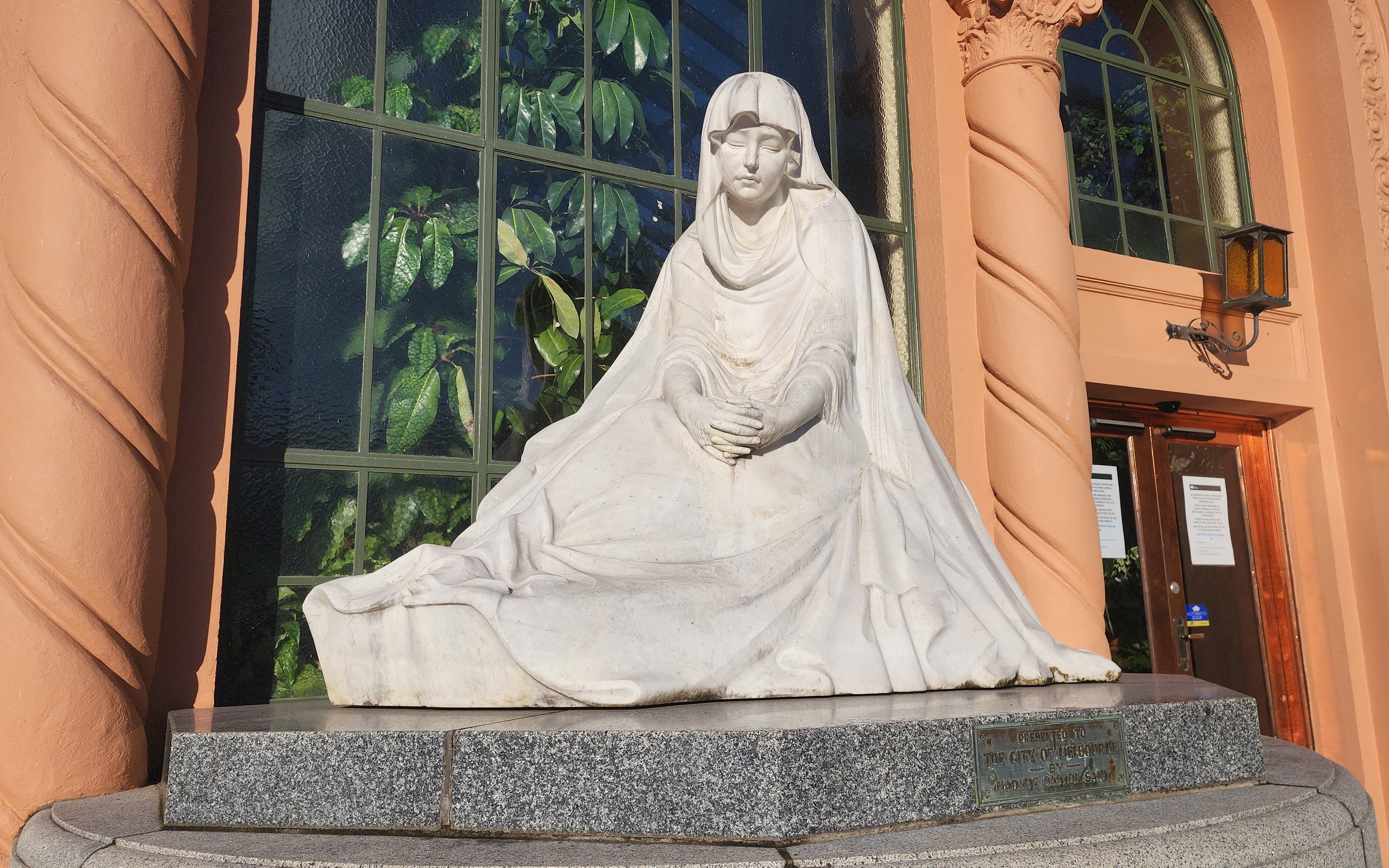
Statue of Meditation at the Conservatory, Fitzroy Gardens, Melbourne

== Works ==
- Le Vent et la feuille (The Wind and the Leaf, exhibited at the Salon des artistes français of 1912)
- Monuments to the dead of Fère-Champenoise, Oissel, Saint-Étienne-du-Rouvray, Cutry...
- Monument To those lost in Latham 47 at Caudebec-en-Caux (1931)
- Monument of Neuf-Marché
- Meditation, Fitzroy Gardens, Melbourne (Australia)
- Bust of Alexis Ballot-Beaupré, Cour de cassation, Palais de justice, Paris
