= Société d'Études Aéronautiques =

Early French military aircraft manufacturer

- Romanized name: Society for Aeronautical Studies
- Industry: Aerospace manufacturer
- Founded: 1916 in Suresnes, Paris, France
- Founders: Henry Potez, Marcel Bloch, and Louis Coroller
- Defunct: 1919
- Areas served: Worldwide
- Products: Aircraft

The Société d'Études Aéronautiques (SEA) (French pronunciation: [sɔsjete detyd(z‿)aeʁɔnotik], "Society for Aeronautical Studies") was a French aircraft manufacturer founded in 1916 by Henry Potez, Marcel Bloch, and Louis Coroller at Suresnes.

Having been established amid the First World War, the company was from its onset focused upon the manufacture of military aircraft. It quickly found work producing large numbers of combat aircraft on behalf of the French military. However, following the end of the conflict, a major glut in surplus aircraft and the cancellation of many outstanding orders rapidly pushed the company into dire straights. Some officials, like Bloch, decided to withdraw from the aviation sector entirely in light of the poor economic prospects of the early 1920s aviation market.

== History ==
The formation of the Société d’Etudes Aéronautiques (SEA) can be largely attributed to the undertakings of two French engineers, Henry Potez and Marcel Bloch. Prior to SEA, Potez and Bloch had been talented aeronautical engineers that decided to form a partnership to development and manufacture of their original design of propellers, establishing the Société des Hélices Éclair. However, they soon sought to go beyond just manufacturing components, but to undertake the design and construction of whole aircraft, thus, they both joined forces with another friend, Louis Coroller, to establish SEA. Its founding coincided with the First World War, and thus much of its activity was heavily influenced by the demands and lack thereof from this conflict.

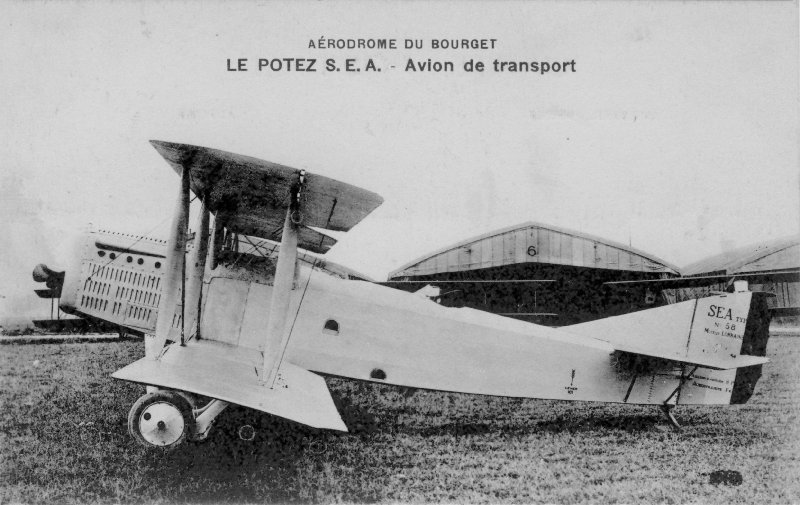
The SEA IV fighter

The company was originally engaged to manufacture the SPAD VII fighter under licence. However, it soon developed its original designs and put those into production as well. Several early aircraft, starting with the SEA I, proved somewhat unsatisfactory and requiring further development. However, one such aircraft, the SEA IV, was selected for production for the French military. The "Ministère de l'Armement et des Fabrications de guerre" (Ministry of Armament and War Production) opted to place an order for 1,000 aircraft, which were intended to be produced at a rate of 200 per month and to be fulfilled by early 1919. To meet this rapid demand, Potez and Bloch founded a separate company, the Compagnie Anjou Aéronautique ("Anjou Aeronautical Company"), to undertake their production. This entity was established at Angers with a new partner Julien Bessonneau. However, the outstanding production order would ultimately be cancelled, causing fatal economic hardship for both companies.

However, the company's fortune quickly reversed following the Armistice of 11 November 1918 that marked the end of the conflict. Without a major ongoing war driving demand, peace quickly led to a major downturn in the sale and production of aircraft, pushing many aviation companies to the brink. The French Government's aircraft manufacturing department allegedly lacked interest in providing support to any of the nation's manufacturers. Accordingly, many companies and individuals alike decided to withdraw from the aviation sector during the late 1910s and early 1920s in favour of other endeavours.

SEA was wound up shortly after the conflict's end. However, Potez and Bloch went on to found their own separate and highly successful companies shortly thereafter. The Société d'Etudes Aéronautiques, a Belgian firm of the same name established in 1936 was entirely unrelated to the earlier French company.

== Aircraft ==
- SEA IV
- Potez SEA VII

== Bibliography ==
- Coroller, Jean-Louis (December 1997). "Les Avions S.E.A.: ou la préhistoire des Avions Marcel Bloch et des Avions Henry Potez" [The Aircraft of S.E.A., or the Prehistory of the Marcel Bloch and Henry Potez Aircraft Companies]. Avions: Toute l'aéronautique et son histoire (in French) (57): 35–41. ISSN 1243-8650.
