= Latham 43 =

Latham 42 and 43
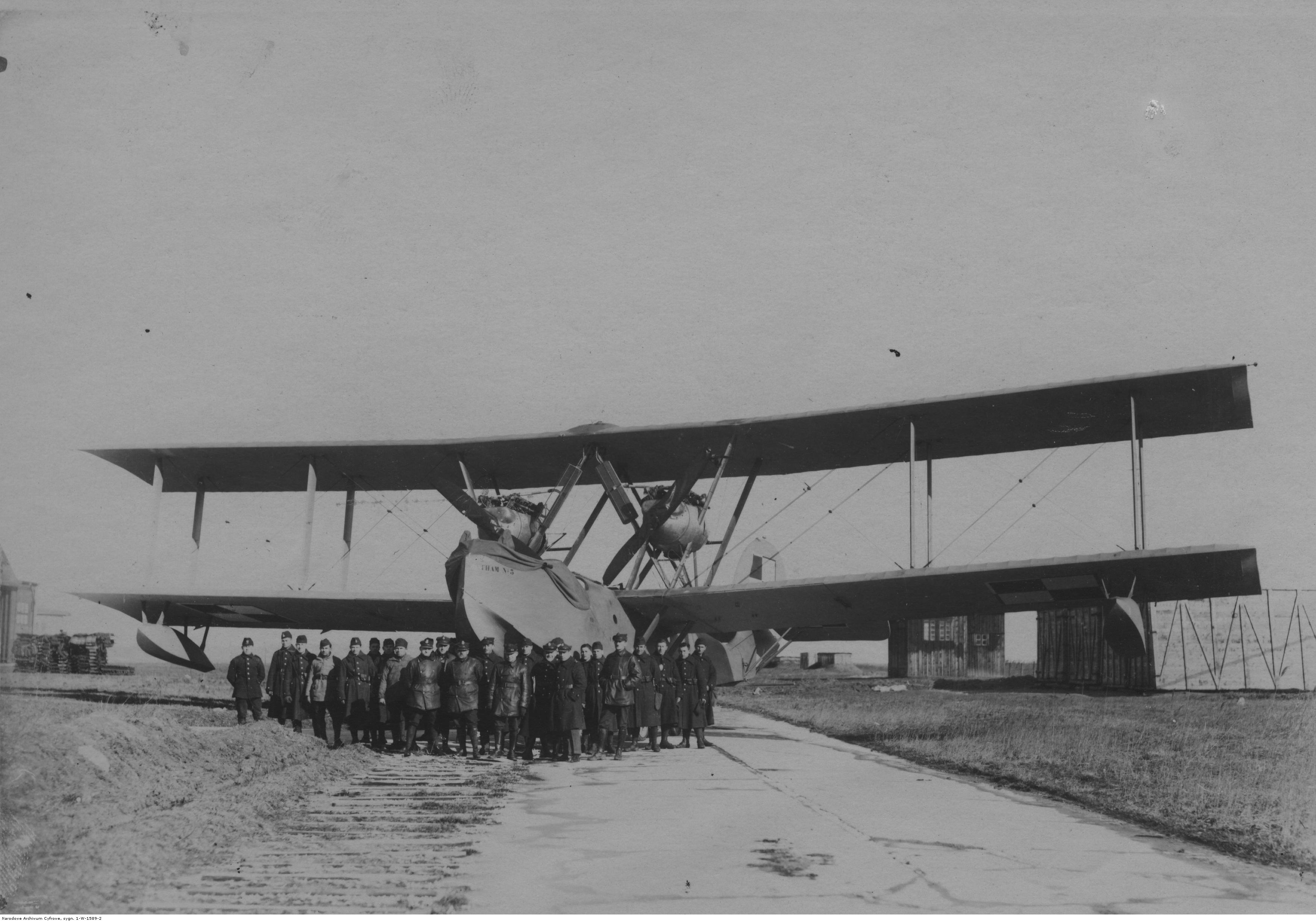

General information
- Type: Flying boat bomber
- National origin: France
- Manufacturer: Latham
- Primary user: Aéronavale
- Number built: 28

History
- First flight: 1924

The Latham 43 was a flying boat bomber built in France in the 1920s for service with the French Navy. It was a conventional design for its day - a two-bay biplane with unstaggered wings, and engines mounted tractor-fashion on struts in the interplane gap. The pilot sat in an open cockpit, with a gunner in an open bow position, and another in an open position amidships.

Two examples, designated Latham 42 powered by liquid-cooled Vee engines were evaluated by the navy in 1924, leading to a contract for 18 aircraft powered by air-cooled radial engines instead. Designated Latham 43 by the manufacturer and HB.3 in naval service (for Hydravion de bombardement - "Seaplane-bomber", 3 seats), they remained in service between 1926 and 1929.

Eight other machines with the original liquid-cooled engine were sold to Poland.

== Variants ==
- prototypes with Lorraine 12Da engines (2 built)
- production version for France with Gnome et Rhône 9Aa engines (18 built)
- production version for Poland with Lorraine engines (8 built)

== Operators ==
France

- Aéronavale
  - Escadrille 4R1
  - Escadrille 5R1

Poland

- Polish Naval Aviation
  - Morski Dywizjon Lotniczy based at Puck

== Specifications (French production version) ==
General characteristics

- Crew: Three
- Length: 15.60 m (61 ft 2 in)
- Wingspan: 22.50 m (73 ft 10 in)
- Height: 5.40 m (17 ft 9 in)
- Wing area: 125 m^{2} (1,345 sq ft)
- Empty weight: 3,460 kg (7,610 lb)
- Gross weight: 5,390 kg (11,860 lb)
- Powerplant: 2 × Gnome et Rhône 9Aa , 280 kW (380 hp) each

Performance

- Maximum speed: 160 km/h (100 mph, 87 kn)
- Range: 800 km (500 mi, 430 nmi)
- Service ceiling: 4,600 m (15,100 ft)

Armament

- 1 × trainable .303 machine gun in open position in bow
- 1 × trainable .303 machine gun in open position amidships
- 400 kg (880 lb) of bombs

== See also ==
Related lists

- List of Interwar military aircraft

== Bibliography ==
- Nelcarz, Bartolomiej & Peczkowski, Robert (2001). White Eagles: The Aircraft, Men and Operations of the Polish Air Force 1918–1939. Ottringham, UK: Hikoki Publications. ISBN 1-902109-73-2.
- Passingham, Malcolm (November–December 1999). "Latham's 'Boats: Pictorial History of the Designs of Jean Latham". Air Enthusiast (84): 22–27. ISSN 0143-5450.
