= Lorraine 12D =

1910s French piston aircraft engine

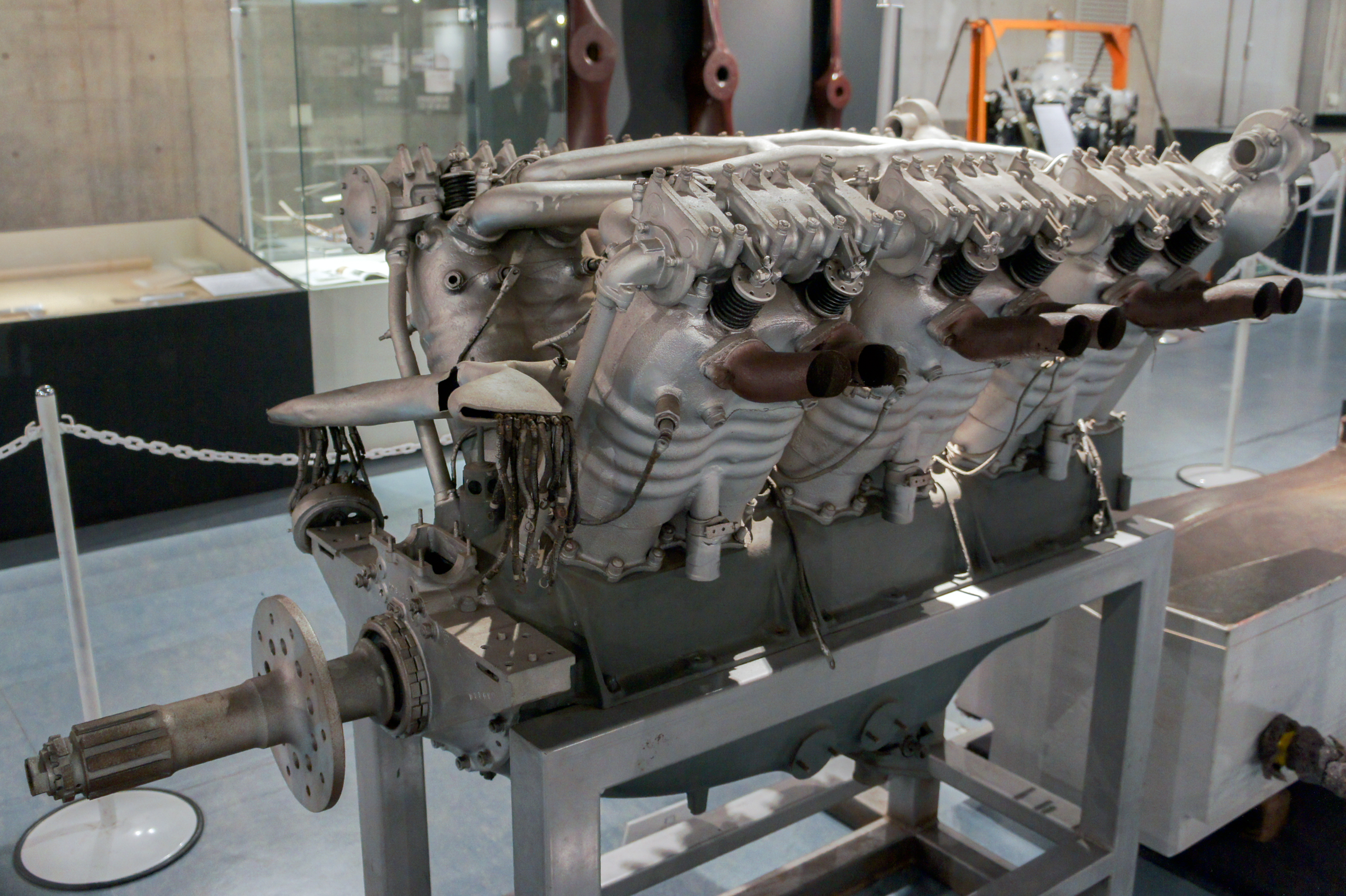
- A Lorraine 12D on display at the National Museum of Nature and Science in Tokyo, Japan
- National origin: France
- Manufacturer: Lorraine-Dietrich
- Designer: Marius Barbarou
- Manufactured: 1917–1925

The Lorraine 12D, also referred to as Lorraine-Dietrich 12D, was a series of water-cooled V12 engines produced by the French company Lorraine-Dietrich. The first variant began production in 1917, and the engines were used to power bombers for the French Navy during World War I. The Lorraine 12Da variant was the most powerful French engine at the time. After the war, the engines were licensed and produced by the Italian firm Isotta Fraschini until 1925.

== Design and development ==
In 1916, French engineer Marius Barbarou began working a new V12 engine oriented at a 60-degree angle and a 120 mm (4.7 in) bore, to improve on the existing Lorraine-Dietrich 8B engine by adding two cylinders on each side. The Lorraine 12D was approved in January 1917 at 350 hp (260 kW). Lorraine produced 50 of the 12D engines. In 1917, the Lorraine 12Da was produced with an increase to 400 hp (300 kW) and 400 units produced. The Lorraine 12Da variant became the most powerful French airplane engine at the time of World War I. The more powerful design resulted in a heavier powertrain due to added radiators for cooling. The extra weight meant that the planes could operate for two hours on the available fuel supply. The engines continued to be used by the military, but were unsuitable for commercial use due to the limited travel range.

The engines were mass produced at a factory in Argenteuil, to meet demands of the French Navy for bombers. At the time of the armistice of 11 November 1918, Lorraine had hundreds of surplus engines which were later used in French Navy prototypes. New models were not developed during this time, and Lorraine halted production of the 12D engines in 1922. In 1924 the Italian company Isotta Fraschini bought the rights for the engine under the license of the 12Db, and later marketed the engine under its own company name, Isotta Fraschini 12Db until 1925.

== Variants ==
The Lorraine 12D had several variants produced which included:

Year	Model	Power	Design	Displacement	Production
1916	12D	370 hp (280 kW)	V12 at 60°, water cooled	24.4L (1489 cu.in.)	50 units
1917	12Da	400 hp (300 kW)	V12 at 60°, water cooled	24.4L (1489 cu.in.)	400 units
1918	12Db	400 hp (300 kW)	V12 at 60°, water cooled	24.4L (1489 cu.in.)	850 units
1919	12Dc	370 hp (280 kW)	V12, water cooled	24.4L (1489 cu.in.)	100 units

== Applications ==
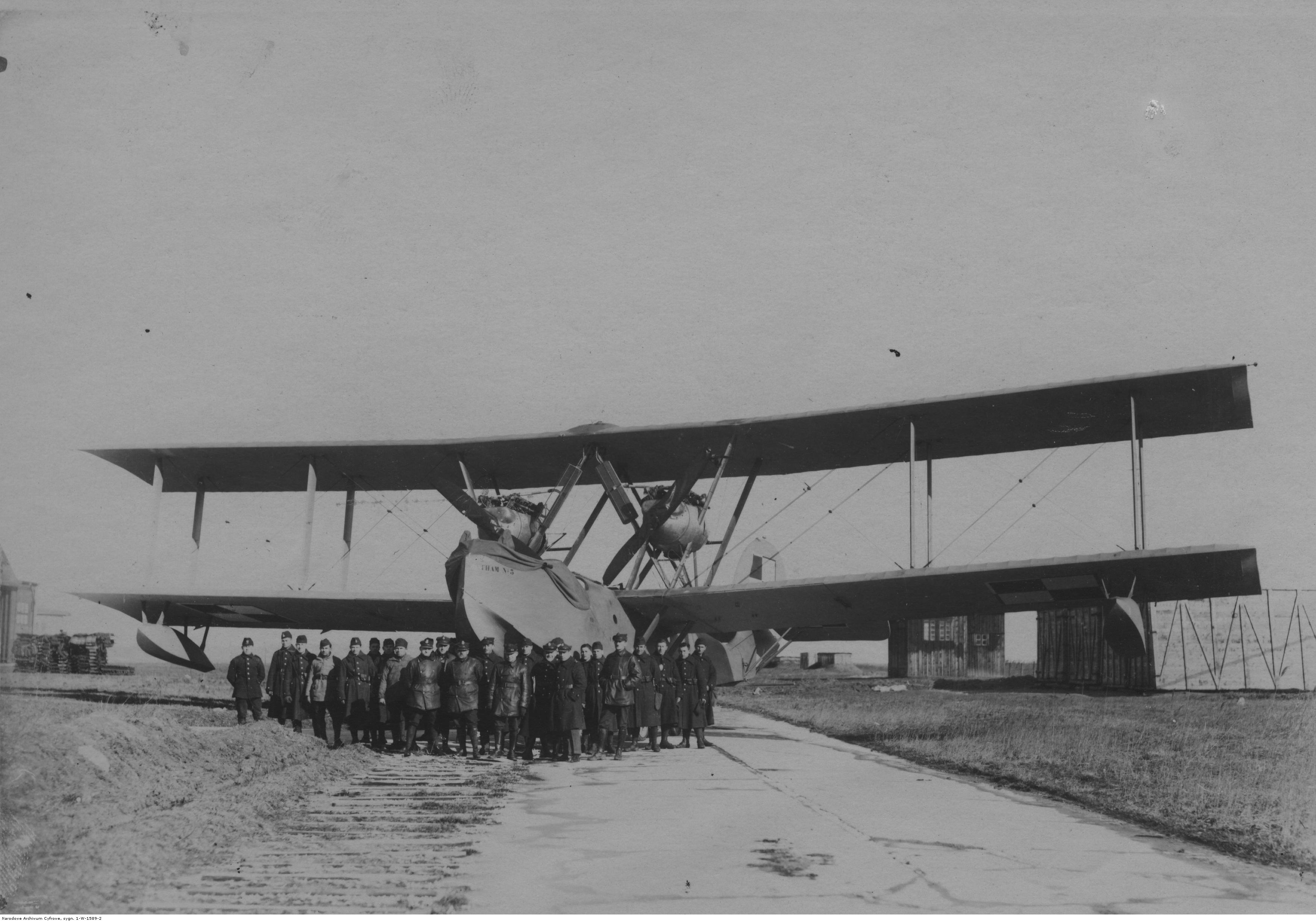
The Latham 43 (pictured) was powered by the Lorraine 12Da.

The Lorraine 12D powered the first Groupe Latécoère planes. The 12Da was mounted on the CAMS 37 prototype seaplane, and later used on the first Potez planes. The successor 12Db engine was used mostly by the Farman Aviation Works, and the Société Latham. Isotta Fraschini 12Db used the Lorraine engines to power Italian aircraft including the Macchi M.7, Macchi M.24bis and Caproni Ca.73bis.

Complete list of planes powered by the Lorraine 12D:

12D

- Halbronn H.T.2, Latécoère 5, Latécoère 16

12Da

- CAMS 37 (prototype), Latham 43, Lioré et Olivier LeO H-10, SEA IV, Potez SEA VII, Potez IX, Potez XII, Farman F.120, Percheron 18

12Db

- Besson MB.26, Latham E-5, Lioré et Olivier LeO 12, Levasseur PL.3, Potez XI, Potez XV, Potez XVII, Potez 23, Potez 27, Farman F.60 Goliath, Farman F.62, Farman F.63bis, Farman F.122, Farman F.140 Super Goliath, Farman F.150bis, Breda A.7 L.D., Breda A.8, CANT 6ter, CANT 10ter, Caproni Ca.71, Caproni Ca.73bis, Macchi M.7, Macchi M.24bis, Savoia-Marchetti S.59, Yokosuka E1Y

12Dc

- Farman F.72, Lioré et Olivier LeO H-10

== Specifications (12Da) ==
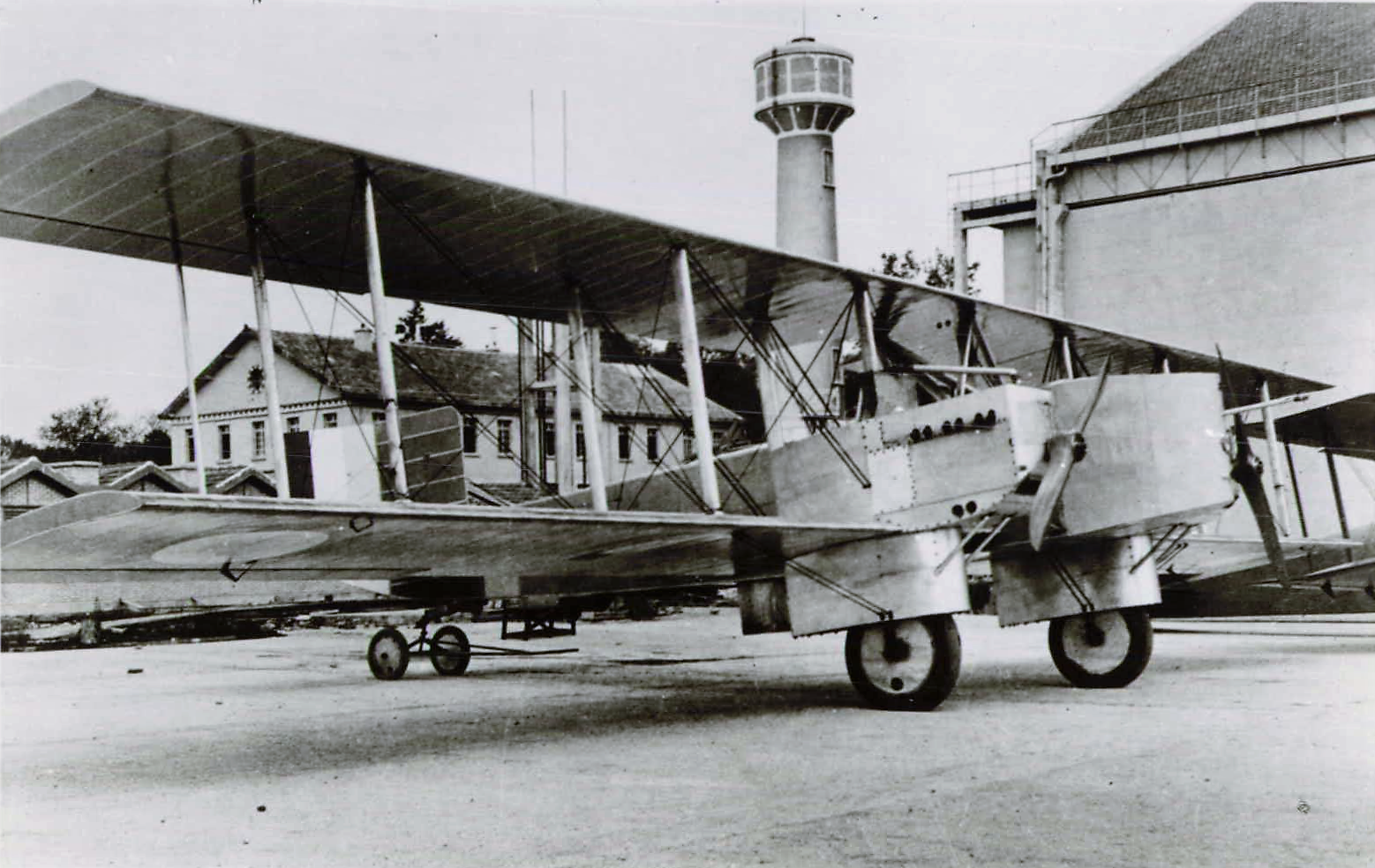
The Lioré et Olivier LeO 12 (pictured) was powered by the Lorraine 12Db.

Data from Les moteurs d'aviation Lorraine

=== General characteristics ===
- Bore: 120 mm (4.7 in)
- Stroke: 180 mm (7.1 in)
- Displacement: 24.4 L (1,490 cu in)
- Dry weight: 420 kg (930 lb)

=== Components ===
- Fuel type: Benzene

=== Performance ===
- Power output: 400 hp (300 kW) at 1700 rpm

== See also ==
- List of aircraft engines
