= Latham HB.5 =

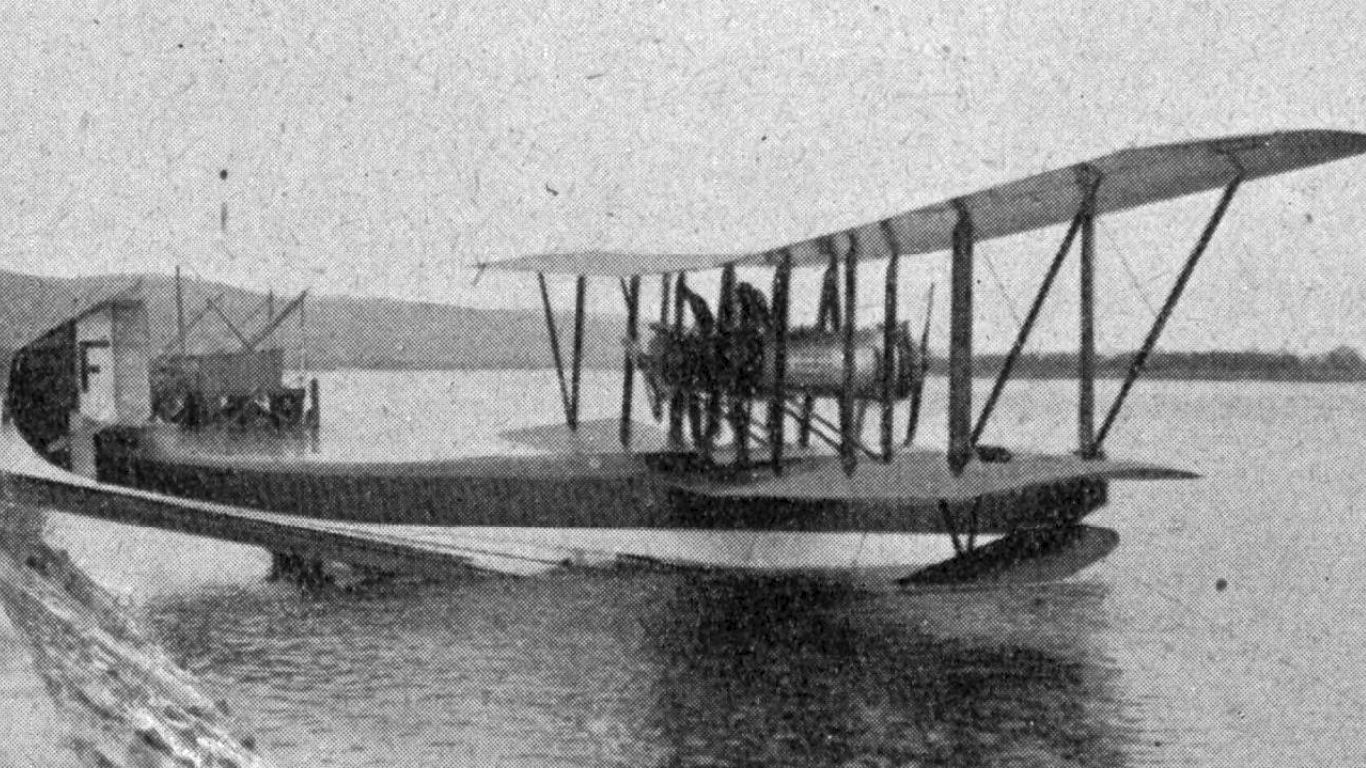

General information
- Type: Flying boat bomber or 10 passenger transport aircraft
- National origin: France
- Manufacturer: Latham
- Number built: 10

History
- First flight: 2 July 1921
- Developed from: Latham Trimotor

The Latham HB.5 was a French biplane flying boat with four engines in push-pull configuration pairs. Ten were used by the French Navy.

== Design and development ==
Despite its military designation as an HB.5 or five-crew flying boat bomber, this four-engine aircraft was designed as a civil version of the Latham Trimoteur of 1919. The main design change was to move from three engines to four whilst retaining a total power of about 750 kW (1,000 hp). Its original Latham type number is not known.

It was a large biplane, with unequal span wings of high aspect ratio for the day. In plan the wings, mounted with very slight stagger, were rectangular out to straight-angled tips. There were three parts, a central section attached to the upper hull which contained the engines and had no dihedral and outer sections with about 2° of dihedral. Each outer section was divided into two bays with three vertical pairs of interplane struts, the innermost at the junction with the central section. Outboard, the overhangs of the upper wing were supported by outward-leaning pairs of struts from the feet of the outer interplane pairs; below these points flat-bottomed floats which provided lateral stability on water were mounted on short struts. The upper centre section was supported over the fuselage with a pair of transverse pair of inverted V-struts. Balanced, short-span, broad-chord ailerons were mounted at the tips of the upper wing only.

The HB.5's four water-cooled, nine-cylinder Salmson 9Z radial engines were mounted as push-pill pairs, with each pair sharing a single nacelle placed midway between the centre section wings on a frame of horizontal members and diagonal struts, tied to the inner interplane struts and the centre section V-struts. The 3.40 m (11.2 ft) interplane gap allowed the rear propellers to turn between the wings; the tractor pairs were just ahead of the wing leading edge. 1,000 L (220 imp gal; 260 US gal) of fuel was equally distributed between four fuselage tanks.

The hull of the HB.5 was 17 m (56 ft) long and had a maximum width of 2.80 m (9.2 ft). The forward planing hull had soft chine, ending at a single step under the wings. Entirely mahogany-covered, the hull was divided internally into seven compartments. The bow compartment contained mooring gear, and the pilot and co-pilot sat side by side in an open cockpit in the second. The flight engineer sat in another open cockpit in the third compartment, just behind the pilots. The fourth compartment contained the passenger cabin, "luxuriously furnished" for ten passengers and provided two large, glazed portholes for viewing. Cabin access was via a starboard side gangplank and the engineer's position. Their baggage, together with sacks of air-mail, was stored in the sixth compartment and the wireless operator housed in the seventh.

The hull became slender towards the rear and curved upwards to support a biplane, constant-chord horizontal tail with balanced elevators on its upper and lower planes. Between the planes were three fins, each carrying a rudder; their trapezoidal shape allowed for elevator movement.

== Operational history ==
The HB.5 first flew on 2 July 1921. Ten were bought by the French Navy. Rather little is known about their activities though in 1923 they took part in torpedo-dropping trials. Because of their flying boat hull, they could not carry the weapon in the normal central position but only asymmetrically. There was no intention to use them operationally as torpedo bombers, but release of the single off-set device provided an insight into the possibilities and difficulties for aircraft which carried more than one torpedo underwing, released sequentially.

== Specifications ==
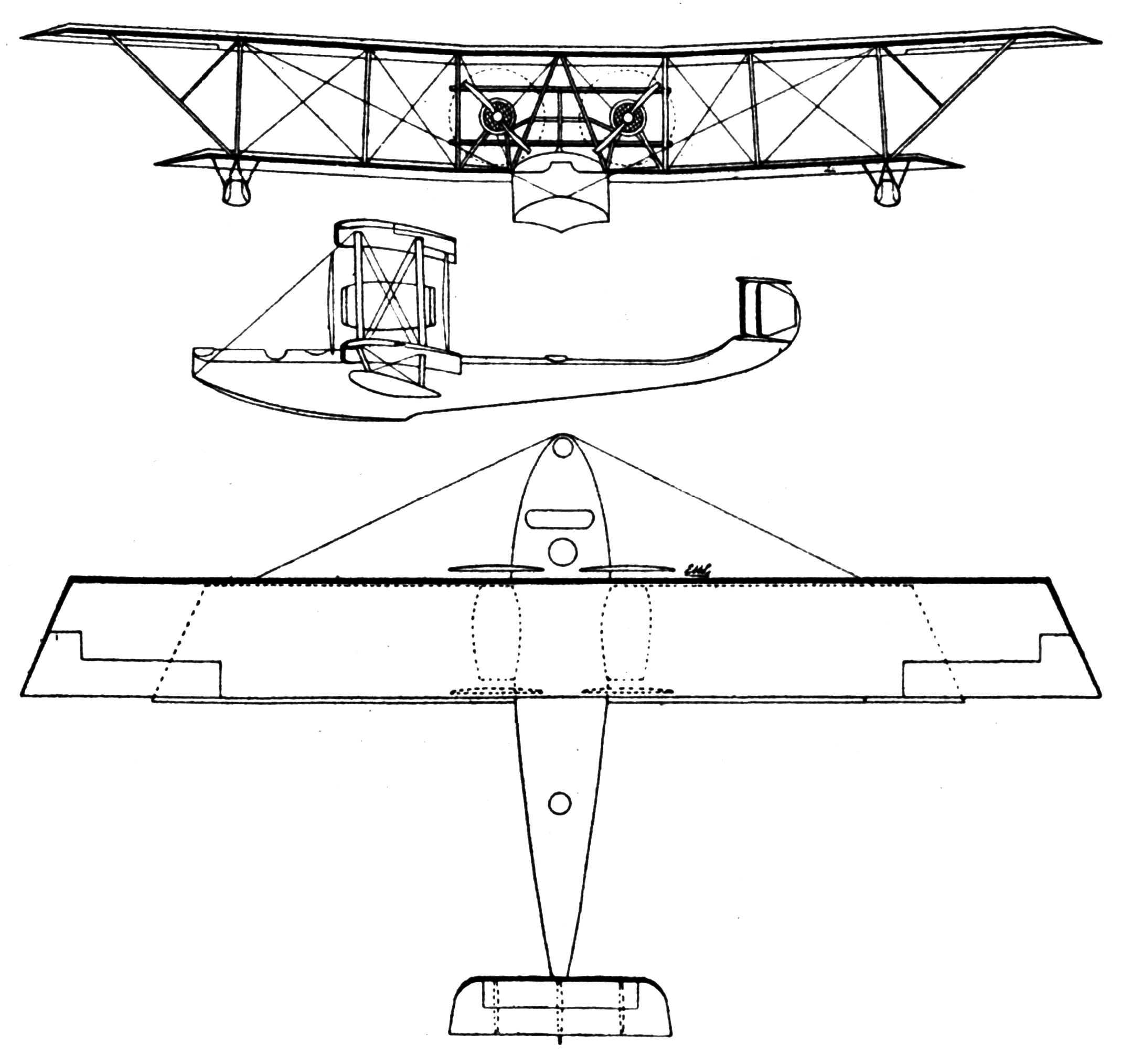
Latham HB.5 3-view drawing from Les Ailes July 28, 1921

Data from Les Ailes August 1921 unless indicated

General characteristics

- Crew: Five
- Capacity: Ten passengers
- Length: 18.2 m (59 ft 9 in)
- Upper wingspan: 32.0 m (105 ft 0 in)
- Lower wingspan: 24.0 m (78 ft 9 in)
- Height: 6.0 m (19 ft 8 in)
- Wing area: 180 m^{2} (1,900 sq ft)
- Aspect ratio: 9.1 (upper wing), 6.9 (lower wing)
- Empty weight: 4,450 kg (9,811 lb)
- Gross weight: 7,200 kg (15,873 lb)
- Fuel capacity: fuel and oil 1,300 kg (2,900 lb)
- Useful load: 1,160 kg (2,560 lb)
- Powerplant: 4 × Salmson 9Z water-cooled 9-cylinder radial, 190 kW (250 hp) each
- Propellers: 2-bladed

Performance

- Maximum speed: 164 km/h (102 mph, 89 kn) at ground level.
- Cruise speed: 130 km/h (81 mph, 70 kn) economic
- Range: 1,000 km (620 mi, 540 nmi)
- Service ceiling: 3,500 m (11,500 ft)

== Bibliography ==
- Philippe Busch, L'épopée des hydravions Latham : L'Aéronautique maritime
- Passingham, Malcolm (November–December 1999). "Latham's 'Boats: Pictorial History of the Designs of Jean Latham". Air Enthusiast (84): 22–27. ISSN 0143-5450.
