= Hippolyte Sebron =

French painter

Hippolyte Victor Valentin Sebron
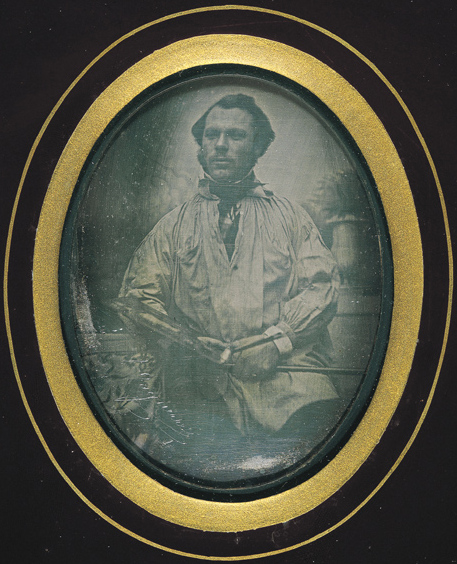
- Photograph by Louis Daguerre identified as Hippolyte Sebron.
- Born: August 21, 1801; Caudebec-en-Caux, France
- Died: September 1, 1879 (aged 78); Paris, France
- Education: École des Beaux-Arts

Hippolyte Victor Valentin Sebron (21 August 1801 - 1 September 1879) was a French landscape, cityscape and portrait painter. He was also a photographer and worked in pastels.

== Biography ==
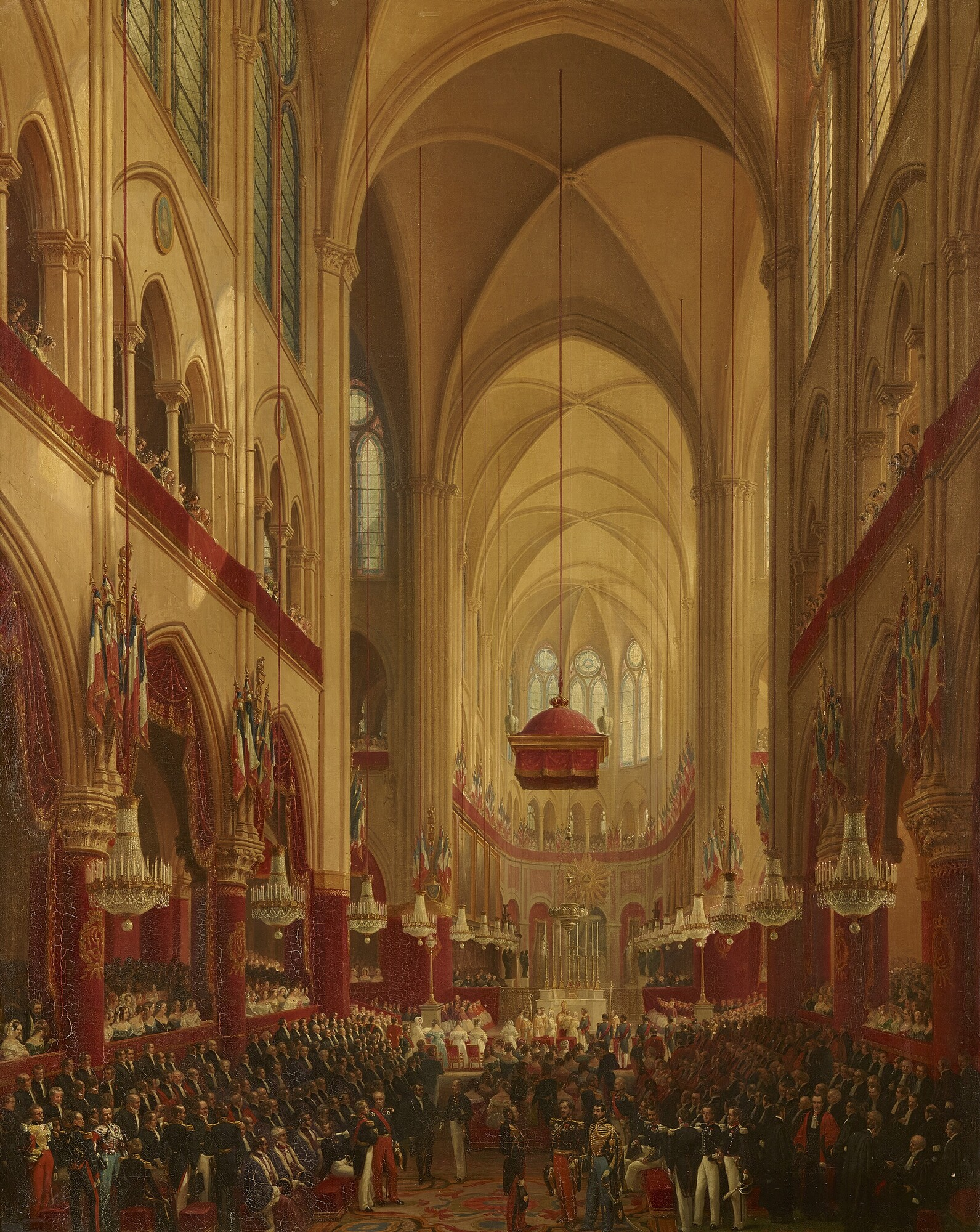
Baptism of Prince Philippe, Count of Paris (1841), commissioned by King Louis-Philippe.

Sebron was born 21 August 1801 in Caudebec-en-Caux, France. He studied at the École des Beaux-arts. At first, he worked as a decorative painter. His first exhibition at the Salon came in 1825. Soon, he gained a reputation as a painter of interior portraits. Later, he became a student of Léon Cogniet.

In 1827, while decorating the new Théâtre de l'Ambigu-Comique, he was taken as a student by Louis Daguerre and became a collaborator on Daguerre's popular theatre dioramas.

After some time, he began to feel that he was not getting proper recognition, but chose to remain in the partnership, despite offers of permanent work in London during a trip to England. The break-up came when the French government awarded Daguerre an annual pension of 2,000 Francs for devising new techniques that Sebron felt were his ideas. He also claimed to have been entirely responsible for fourteen of the thirty dioramas created during his time with Daguerre.

He quit making dioramas entirely, although his style would always reflect that experience. In 1830, he made a visit to Italy where he created over 150 views of cities and monuments. That, however, proved to be just the beginning of his travels. In 1838, he went to Spain, Portugal and North Africa with Baron Isidore Justin Séverin Taylor to create an illustrated album. After executing a commission from King Louis-Philippe I for the historical museum at Versailles, he spent some time in England. This was followed by another trip to Spain and Morocco.

During the Revolution of 1848, over twenty of his works were destroyed in the burning of the Château de Neuilly. Soon after, he began planning a trip to North America. He left in 1849 and would spend the next six years travelling throughout Canada and the United States, with stays in Louisiana and New York, where he participated in the Exhibition of the Industry of All Nations. In New York, he painted numerous scenes of Niagara Falls as well as several New York City landmarks including City Hall Park and Broadway. He also painted more than 60 portraits during this time.

He lived in Louisiana from 1850 to 1854. New Orleans Museum of Art curator Estill Curtis Pennington called Sebron's "Giant Steamboats on the Levee at New Orleans" "one of the first genuinely luminescent works to be painted in Louisiana," and praised the "masterful manipulation of luminism" in his painting "Crocodile Lake, Louisiana."

Nevertheless, he found that the demand for art in America was much less than in Europe and turned to painting portraits to make a living.

Upon returning to France in 1855, he still found himself unable to settle down, wandering throughout Europe and the Mediterranean, as far as Egypt, Istanbul and Syria, where he toured the ruins in 1870. He died in Paris on 1 September 1879.

== Selected paintings ==
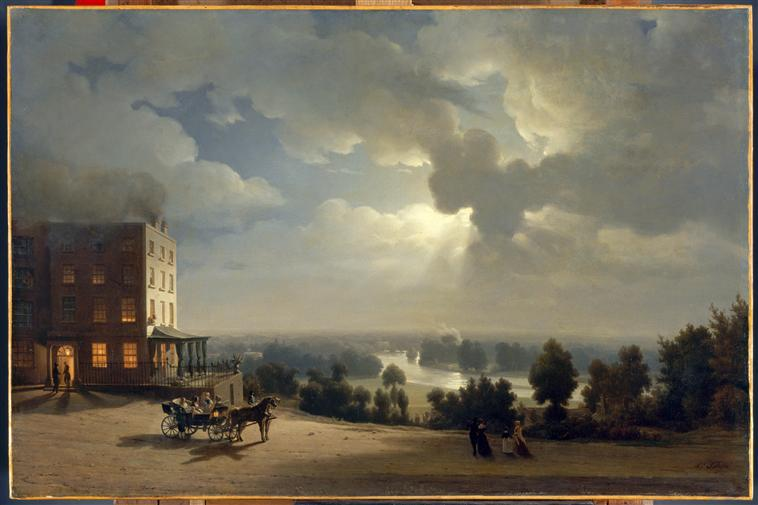
Moonlight in Richmond, North Yorkshire (1845)

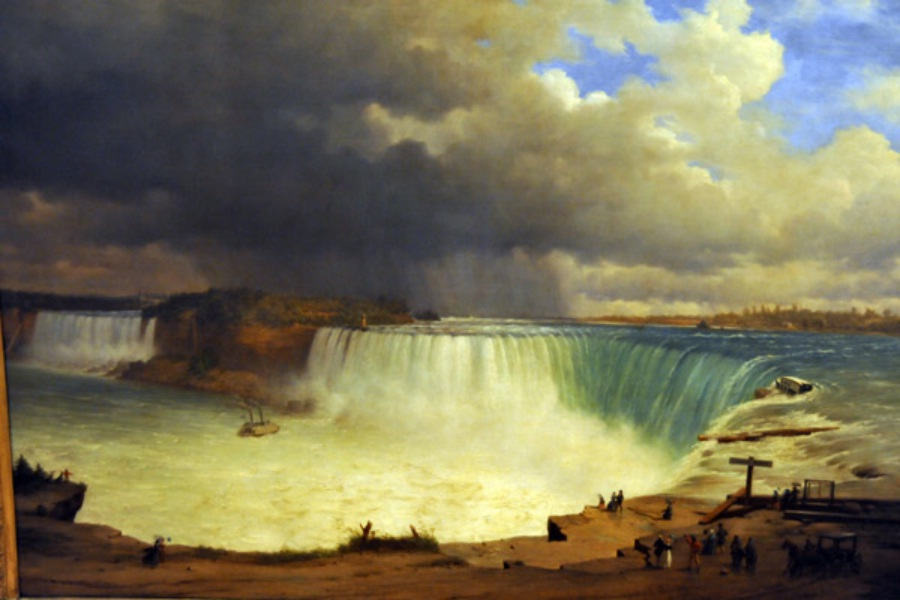
Table Rock, Niagara Falls (1850)

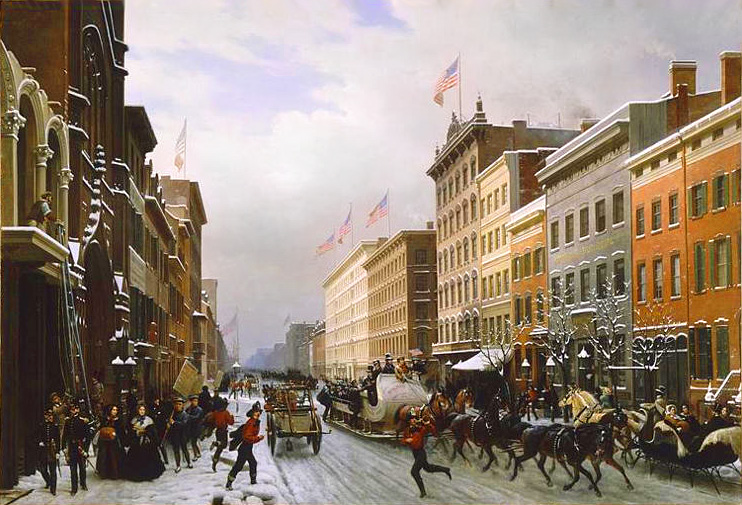
Broadway in Winter (1855)

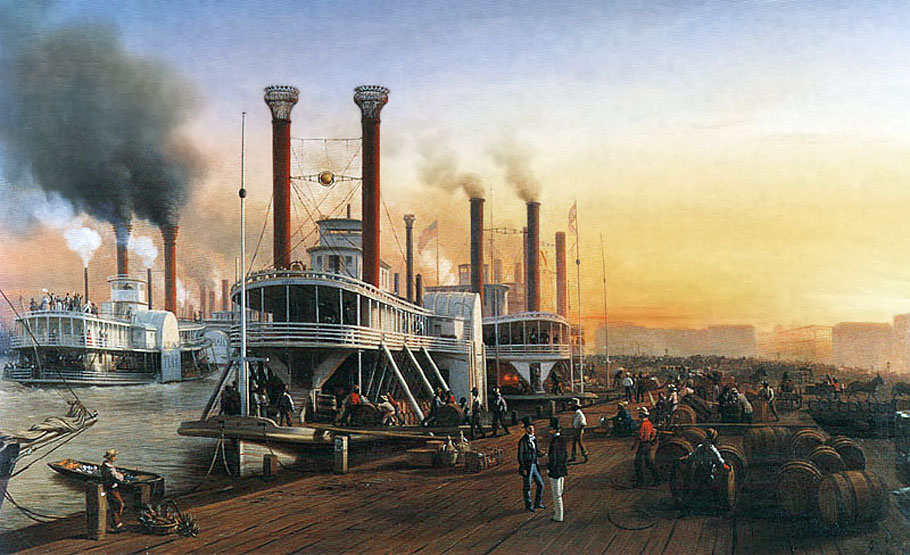
Steamboats in New Orleans (1853)

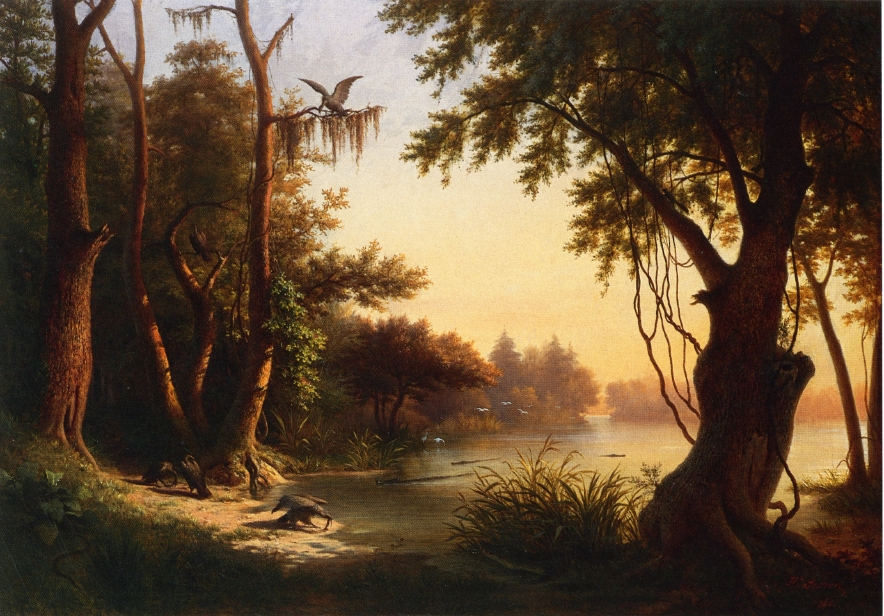
Crocodile Lake, Louisiana (1861)

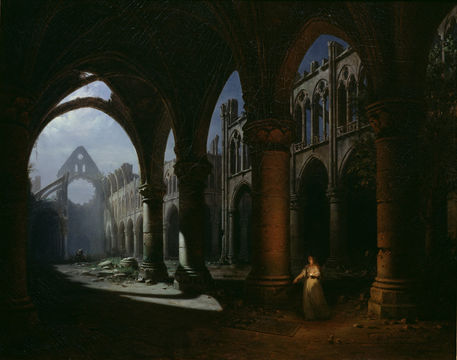
Intérieur d'une abbaye en ruines (1848)

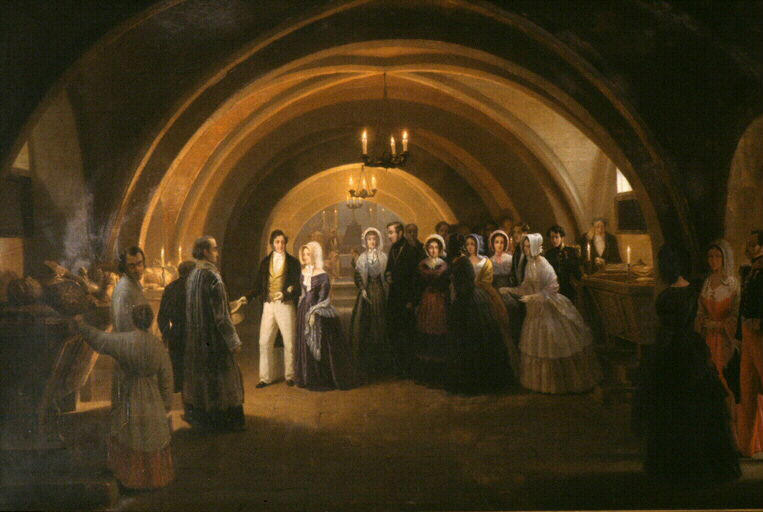
La Reine Victoria au bras de Louis-Philippe visite les tombeaux des comtes d'Eu le 5 septembre 1843 (1845)

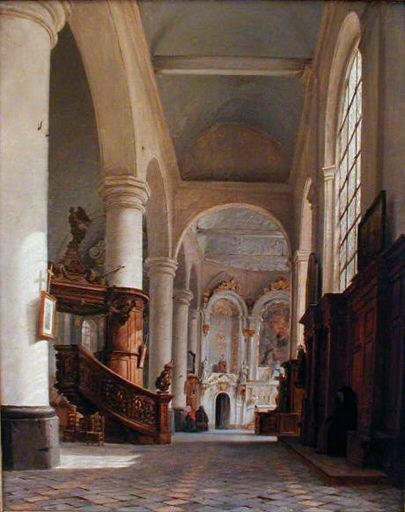
Intérieur de l'église Saint-Denis à Saint-Omer (1835)

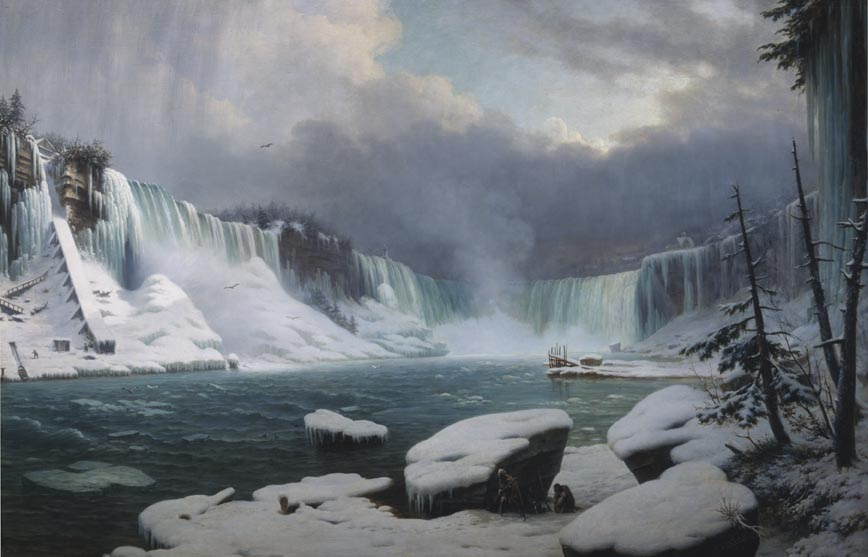
Chutes du Niagara en hiver (1856)
