= Besson MB.26 =

MB.26
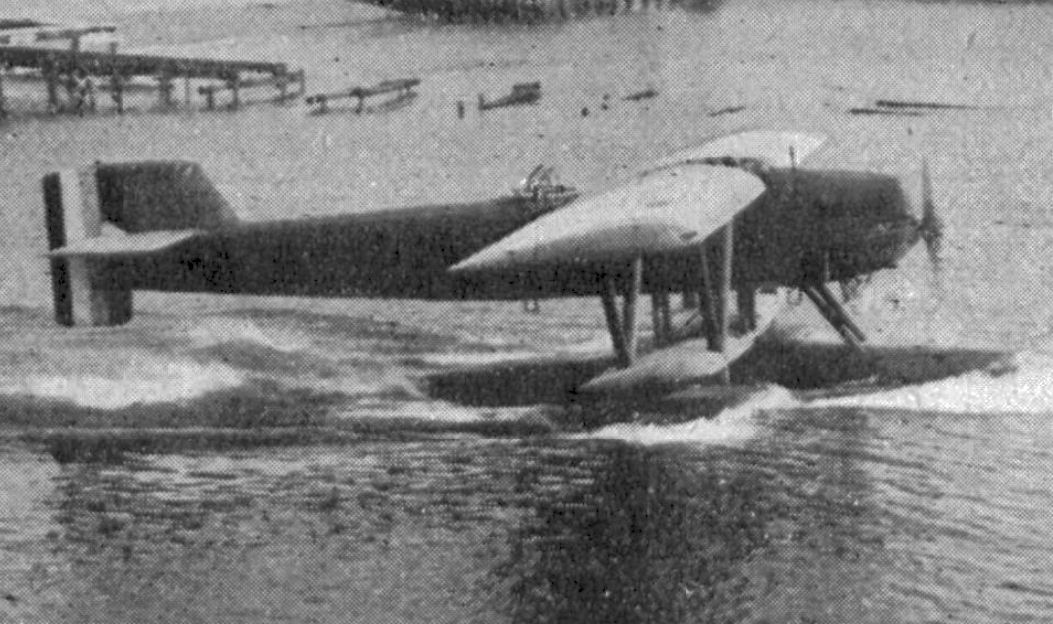

General information
- Type: Reconnaissance or fighter floatplane
- National origin: France
- Manufacturer: Besson
- Designer: Marcel Besson

History
- First flight: 1925

The Beeson MB.26 was a French sesquiplane floatplane designed by Marcel Besson as a shipborne two-seat reconnaissance aircraft for the French Navy, but it was not ordered into production.

== Design and development ==
The MB.26 was a W-strut wing braced sesquiplane, the upper wing was attached at the top of the fuselage and the lower was below the fuselage. It had one main float under the lower wing and two stabilizing floats on the wingtips. This HB.2 variant was followed by a modified C.2 configuration to turn it into a two-seat fighter seaplane. The C.2 had a new round-sided fuselage, the HB.2 had a slab-sided fuselage, and a new tailplane. Neither variant was ordered or entered production.

== Variants ==
MB.26 HB.2
Two-seat reconnaissance seaplane variant.
MB.26 C.2
Two-seat fighter seaplane variant.

== Operators ==
France

- French Navy

== Specifications (HB.2) ==
Data from The Illustrated Encyclopedia of Aircraft

General characteristics

- Crew: 2
- Length: 12.10 m (39 ft 8.25 in)
- Wingspan: 15.00 m (49 ft 2.5 in)
- Height: 3.70 m (12 ft 1.25 in)
- Wing area: 52.00 m^{2} (559.74 sq ft)
- Empty weight: 1,665 kg (3,671 lb)
- Gross weight: 2,415 kg (5,324 lb)
- Powerplant: 1 × Lorraine 12Db inline piston engine , 298 kW (400 hp)

Performance

- Maximum speed: 180 km/h (112 mph, 97 kn)
- Service ceiling: 5,200 m (17,060 ft)

Armament

- One fixed forward-firing 7.7mm (0.303in) machine-gun
- Twin 7.7mm (0.303in) machine-guns on ring-mount at observers cockpit

== See also ==
Related lists

- List of flying boats and floatplanes
