= Levasseur PL.3 =

PL.3 AM3

General information
- Type: Carrier-based reconnaissance aircraft
- National origin: France
- Manufacturer: Levasseur
- Number built: 1

History
- First flight: March 1924

The Levasseur PL.3 AM3 was a carrier-based reconnaissance aircraft produced in France in the 1920s to fulfill a specification for a three-seat carrier-borne reconnaissance aircraft. The PL.3 AM3, a biplane of all-wood construction did not enter production and only the prototype was built.

== Specifications ==
Data from Aviafrance: Levasseur PL.3 AM3

General characteristics

- Crew: 3
- Length: 9.40 m (30 ft 10 in)
- Wingspan: 14.50 m (47 ft 7 in)
- Height: 3.80 m (12 ft 6 in)
- Wing area: 59 m^{2} (640 sq ft)
- Empty weight: 1,435 kg (3,164 lb)
- Gross weight: 2,200 kg (4,850 lb)
- Powerplant: 1 × Lorraine-Dietrich 12Db V-12 water-cooled piston engine, 300 kW (400 hp)
- Propellers: 2-bladed fixed pitchpropeller

Performance

- Maximum speed: 180 km/h (110 mph, 97 kn)
- Range: 600 km (370 mi, 320 nmi)
- Endurance: 5 hours
- Service ceiling: 5,300 m (17,400 ft)

== See also ==
Related lists

- List of Interwar military aircraft
