= Latham Trimotor =

General information
- Type: Military trimotor flying boat
- National origin: France
- Manufacturer: Latham et Cie
- Primary user: Marine française (French Navy air service)
- Number built: 4

History
- First flight: 1919
- Developed into: Latham HB.5

The Latham Trimotor was a large French trimotor biplane built just after World War I and used in small numbers by the French Navy. It had three engines, the outer two in tractor configuration and the central one in pusher configuration. They could carry four "large" bombs and mounted forward and dorsal machine guns. Four aircraft were produced for service with the Marine française.

== Design and development ==
The Latham Trimotor (its Latham type number is not known) was a large biplane, with unequal span, blunted rectangular plan wings with high aspect ratio for the time. The wings were built around a pair of spars constructed from spruce and poplar plywood. They were fabric covered and in three parts, a central section attached to the upper hull and two outer sections divided into two bays with three vertical pairs of parallel interplane struts, the innermost at the junction with the central section. The upper wing centre section was supported over the fuselage by a transverse inverted V-strut to the forward longeron and by two vertical struts to the rear longeron. Outboard, the overhangs of the upper wing were supported by outward leaning pairs of struts from the feet of the outer interplane pairs; below these points small, flat bottomed floats which provided lateral stability on water were mounted. Its ailerons were balanced and mounted only on the upper wing; they were short, reaching outwards from the outer interplane struts.

All three 250 kW (340 hp) Panhard-Levassor 12Cb V-12 engines were mounted midway between the wings in the central section on steel frames. The outer two were in tractor configuration and the central one, mounted above the fuselage, was a pusher. They had rectangular radiators in front of them. Each drove a four blade propeller. In order for the central propeller to clear the fuselage the central engine was mounted higher than the others and the chord of the upper wing reduced to provide a trailing edge cut-away for propeller clearance. Their three 530 L (120 imp gal; 140 US gal) fuel tanks were in the fuselage forward and aft of the space for bombs, passengers or cargo; fuel was pumped from these to a feeder tank in the upper wing so that the engines could be gravity fed.

The hull of the Trimotor was ash framed and covered with poplar or birch plywood. The forward planing hull had soft chine, ending at a single, shallow step under the wings. Ii was divided internally into seven inter-accessible compartments. The first held a machine gunner's post in the extreme nose and the second a side-by-side open pilot's cockpit with dual controls midway between the nose and the leading edge of the wing. The flight engineer shared the third compartment with the two forward fuel tanks, with access through a dorsal hatch and lit by a porthole in the roof. The fourth and fifth compartments housed useful load and fuel respectively. In the more slender fuselage aft of the step the sixth compartment was empty but in the seventh housed the dorsal gunner's cockpit and the radio operator's cabin, lit by side portholes.

The hull became slender towards the rear and curved upwards to support a biplane, constant chord horizontal tail with balanced elevators on its upper and lower planes. The lower elevator was in two parts with a central V-shaped cut-out. Between the planes were three fins, each carrying a rudder; the outer pair were trapezoidal in shape to allow elevator movement but the central one was rounded and deeper, moving in the elevator cut-out.

== Operational history ==
The date of the Trimotor's first flight is not known. Though a contemporary report in August 1920 noting the satisfactory completion of tests at the Latham factory at Caudebec-en-Caux and describing it as the new "High Seas" flying boat suggests a date around the spring of 1920, a modern account gives 1919.

Four Trimotors were ordered by the Marine française. When the first was tested the Navy complained that alighting contact was very hard and so Latham revised the planing surface, giving it harder chine (a steeper V) and used this on the other three Naval Trimotors, giving then gentle landing characteristics. They could carry four "large" bombs".

The Latham HB.5 of 1921 was intended as a civil development, similar but not identical in detail and powered by four, rather than three, slightly less powerful engines whilst maintaining the total power of 750 kW (1,000 hp). No civil sales were made but ten were bought for military use.

== Specifications ==
Data from L'Aéronautique, November 1920

General characteristics

- Crew: 5
- Length: 18.20 m (59 ft 9 in)
- Upper wingspan: 31.70 m (104 ft 0 in)
- Lower wingspan: 24 m (78 ft 9 in)
- Height: 6 m (19 ft 8 in)
- Wing area: 180 m^{2} (1,900 sq ft)
- Aspect ratio: 9.1 upper wing, 6.9 lower wing
- Empty weight: 470 kg (1,036 lb)
- Gross weight: 7,200 kg (15,873 lb)
- Fuel capacity: 1,590 L (350 imp gal; 420 US gal)
- Powerplant: 3 × Panhard-Levassor 12Cb water-cooled V-12, 250 kW (340 hp) each
- Propellers: 4-bladed

Performance

- Maximum speed: 150 km/h (93 mph, 81 kn) at 500 m (1,600 ft)
- Cruise speed: 120 km/h (75 mph, 65 kn)
- Range: 950 km (590 mi, 510 nmi) at cruising speed
- Time to altitude: 19 min to 2,000 m (6,600 ft)
- take-off distance and time at maximum load: 220 m (720 ft); 25 sec

Armament

- Guns: Machine guns in nose and dorsal positions

== Bibliography ==
- Passingham, Malcolm (November–December 1999). "Latham's 'Boats: Pictorial History of the Designs of Jean Latham". Air Enthusiast (84): 22–27. ISSN 0143-5450.
