= Neuf-Marché =

- Commune
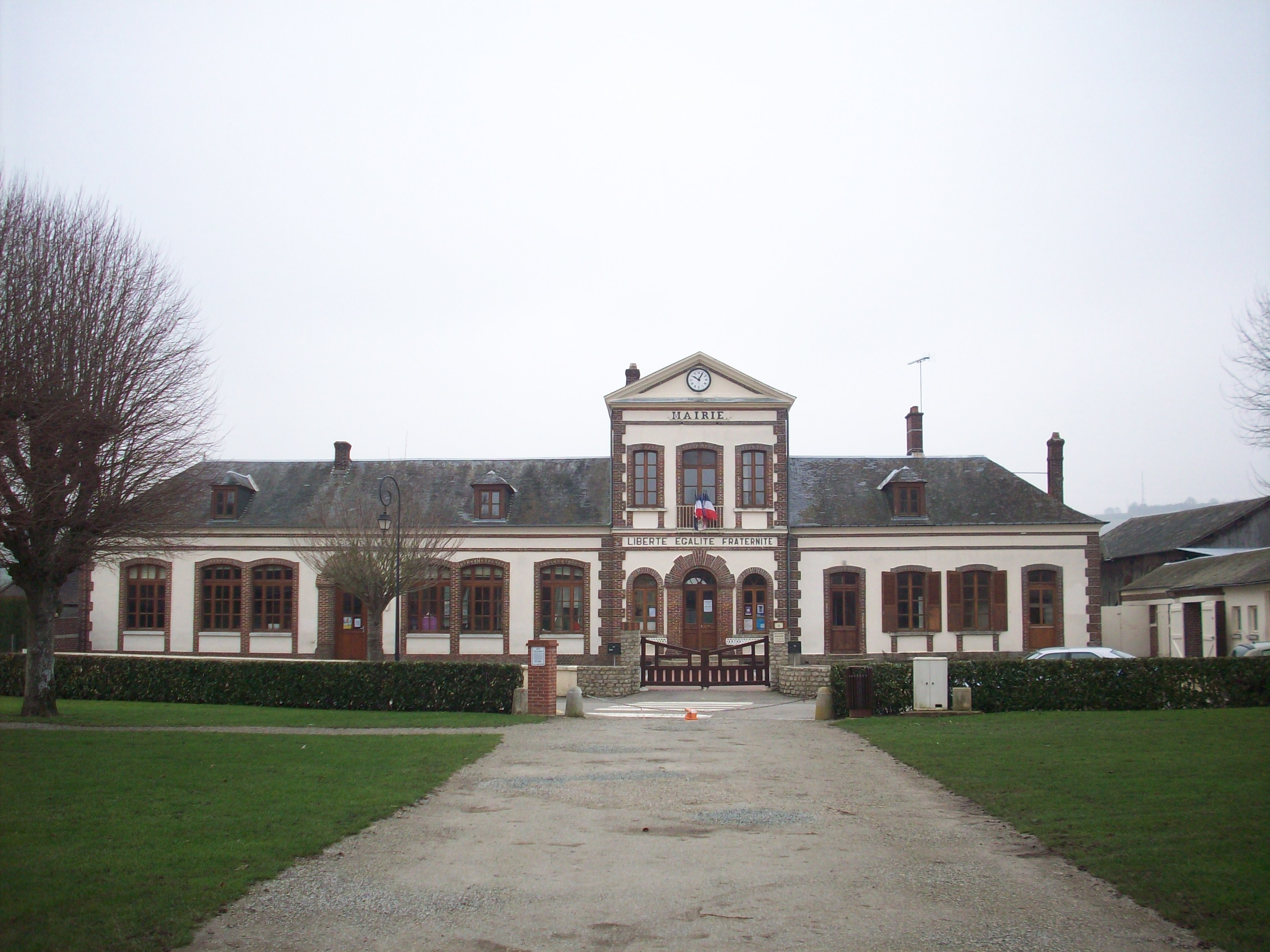
- The town hall in Neuf-Marché

- Coat of arms
- Location of Neuf-Marché
- Location within France Location within Normandy
- Coordinates: 49°25′28″N 1°42′59″E
- Country: France
- Region: Normandy
- Department: Seine-Maritime
- Arrondissement: Dieppe
- Canton: Gournay-en-Bray
- Intercommunality: CC 4 rivières

Government
  - Mayor (2026–32): Dominique But
- Area^{1}: 17.71 km^{2} (6.84 sq mi)
- Elevation: 85 m (279 ft)
- Highest elevation: 210 m (690 ft)
- Lowest elevation: 77 m (253 ft)
- Population (2023): 639
  - Density: 36.1/km^{2} (93.5/sq mi)
- Time zone: UTC+01:00 (CET)
  - Summer (DST): UTC+02:00 (CEST)
- INSEE/Postal code: 76463 /76220
- ^{1} French Land Register data, which excludes lakes, ponds, glaciers > 1 km^{2} (0.386 sq mi or 247 acres) and river estuaries.

Neuf-Marché is a commune in the Seine-Maritime department in the Normandy region in north-western France.

== Geography ==
A forestry and farming village situated by the banks of the river Epte in the Pays de Bray, some 26 miles (42 km) east of Rouen at the junction of the D 915 with the D 1 and D 19 roads. This commune is the furthest southeast within the department and borders both the Eure and Oise departments.

== Population ==
Historical population
Year	Pop.	±% p.a.
1968	569	—
1975	536	−0.85%
1982	514	−0.60%
1990	568	+1.26%
1999	635	+1.25%
2007	676	+0.79%
2012	696	+0.58%
2017	667	−0.85%
2023	639	−0.71%
Source: INSEE

== Places of interest ==
- The church of St. Pierre, dating from the tenth century.
- Traces of a feudal castle.
- Two eighteenth-century presbyteries.
- A sixteenth-century manorhouse.
- The nineteenth-century château of Vardes.
- A monument in the forest of Lyons by Robert Delandre.

== People ==
- Béatrix Beck, author.
- Robert Delandre, sculptor.
- Bernard de Neufmarché, Norman lord active in the conquest of Wales 1088–1095.

== See also ==
- Communes of the Seine-Maritime department
