= Thomas Basin =

French bishop (1412–1491)

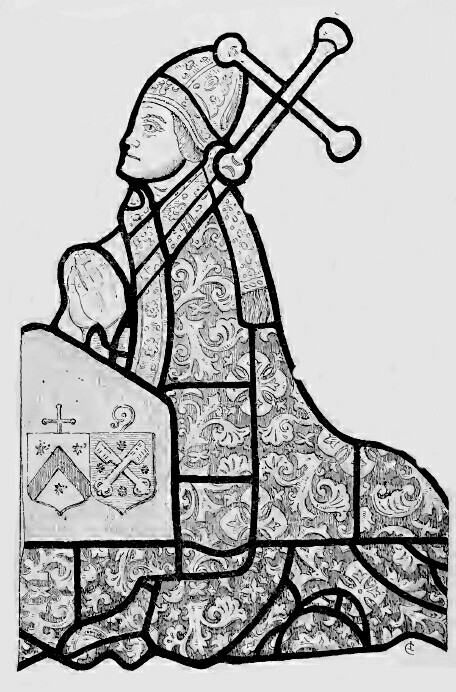
Figured glass window at Caudebec in Normandy, showing Bishop Thomas Basin of Lisieux (1447–1474)

Thomas Basin (1412–1491) was a French bishop of Lisieux and historian.

== Biography ==
Basin was born at Caudebec in Normandy, but in the devastation caused by the Hundred Years' War, his childhood was itinerant. He was taken from Caudebec in 1415, and stayed in Rouen, Vernon, Falaise, Saint-James de Bouvron, Redon, and Nantes. It was on 25 October 1415 that the Battle of Agincourt took place, and there were few safe places in Normandy. Basin did not return to Caudebec until 1419, his stated object being his desire to see his parents again.

=== Scholar ===
In 1424 Basin went to the University of Paris, where he became a master of arts in 1429. He was admitted to the faculty of arts at Leuven on 31 December 1431, declaring his intention to study civil law. In 1433 Basin obtained a bursary at the College of St Augustine in Pavia, which had been founded by Cardinal Branda da Castiglione, a former bishop of Lisieux (1420–1424), who reserved a number of the twenty-four places for students from Normandy. He remained there until he obtained his licenciate in Civil Law. He then returned to Caudebec to visit his parents, and then took up residence in Louvain, from 1435 to 1437, where he obtained his licenciate in Canon Law. By September 1437 he was back in Italy, a Master of Arts and of Canon and Civil Laws, and is found at Bologna, where the Papal Curia and Pope Eugene IV were in residence. He was immediately given the expectation of the rectorship of the parish church of Saint-Germain-de-Carville (diocese of Rouen). This required ordination to the priesthood, but he requested a delay of five years; he was granted two. On 6 December 1437 he was also granted the privilege of holding more than one benefice at a time.

Basin was compelled to return home to Normandy when he discovered that his parents had been forced to flee to Rouen to avoid the English, but he was back on the road to Italy in April 1438. The journey took nearly six months, since his itinerary, which was to include Holland and the Rhine valley, was disrupted by a storm that made him seek refuge in London, where he was ill for two months. When he finally arrived in Italy again, he could not move from Pavia to Ferrara for more than three months because of the plague. He finally rejoined the Curia in September 1438.

=== Curial employee ===
Basin was present at the Council which began at Ferrara, but which was transferred to Florence by decree of Pope Eugene IV on 10 January 1439. During the Council he made the acquaintance of the humanist Poggio Bracciolini, which blossomed into a friendship of twenty years. Both worked on the council's business under the direction of Cardinal Cesarini, the president of the council. On 21 March 1439 Basin was named a Canon of the Cathedral Chapter of Lisieux. In July 1439 he was appointed to an embassy to Hungary, led by Cardinal Cesarini. The embassy was made very difficult when Albert of Austria, King of Hungary, died on 14 October 1439, and a struggle for election to the throne began between supporters of Władysław III of Poland and Queen Elisabeth of Luxembourg. The embassy returned to Florence on 26 March 1440. Basin was soon made Canon and prebendary of the Cathedral Chapter of Rouen by Pope Eugene as his reward for service on the legation. His senior colleague on the embassy, Giovanni Tagliacozzo, was made a cardinal. In 1440 Basin was ordained a subdeacon, but he did not remain long in Italy. On 23 May 1441 he took his stall in the Cathedral Chapter of Rouen. In November 1441 the English Royal Council named him professor of canon law in the new University of Caen. On 1 October 1442 he was elected Rector of the University of Caen. He also became vicar-general for the bishop of Bayeux, Zeno Castiglione, who was a member of the English Royal Council. Basin was one of the negotiators appointed by King Charles VII on 10 June 1445 to negotiate a marriage between one of his daughters and Edward, Duke of York.

=== Bishop ===
On 11 October 1447 Thomas Basin, Doctor in utroque iure (Civil and Canon Law), was appointed Bishop of Lisieux by Pope Nicholas V. It is possible that he was consecrated at Lambeth on 1 November 1447, by Archbishop John Stafford (1443–1452), Bishop Robert Gilbert of London (1436–1448), and Bishop Thomas Bourchier of Ely (1443–1454). On 3 February 1448 he took his oath of allegiance to King Henry VI of England at Windsor Castle.

In the summer of 1449, King Charles VII, determined to drive the English army out of Normandy. After taking Pont-Audemer the French army headed directly for Lisieux, determined on a siege if necessary. The Bishop pleaded with his people to avoid the pillaging and burning of Lisieux, which would become inevitable if they resisted the French. His advice was followed, and on 16 August 1449 he was sent forth and negotiated a treaty with the French. In it, the Bishop retained his privileges as bishop and count, and was given the privilege of naming the Captain who would be Governor of Lisieux. The King accepted the treaty on 28 August, and Bishop Basin took an oath of loyalty to the King of France. He was granted a pension of 1000 livres a year, which was regularly paid (at least according to surviving records) from 1450 to 1460.

=== Exile ===
On 15 August 1461 Bishop Basin took part in the coronation of King Louis XI at Reims. Basin was much involved in the wars between the English and French and was employed by Charles VII of France and by his successor Louis XI, at whose request Basin drew up a memorandum setting forth the misery of the people and suggesting measures for alleviating their condition. On 4 July 1463 Bishop Basin pronounced the excommunication of three persons convicted of witchcraft, who were immediately turned over to "the secular arm". The three witches were burned at the stake on 12 July. Basin was following in the footsteps of his predecessor, Bishop Pierre Cochon, who had turned Jeanne d'Arc over to "the secular arm".

In 1464 the bishop joined the League of the Public Weal and fell into disfavour with King Louis, who seized the temporalities of his see. In 1466 Bishop Basin took refuge in Louvain, where on 5 January he consecrated Louis de Bourbon, Bishop of Liège. He benefited from an amnesty for the members of the League, but Louis would not allow him to return to his diocese. Instead, he was sent to Perpignan as Chancellor of Roussillon and Cerdagne, and then as Ambassador to the King of Aragon; this occupied fourteen months of his virtual exile. He visited Savoy, where Yolande of France was regent, and then cities belonging to the Duke of Burgundy, Geneva, Basle, Trier and Louvain.

In 1474 King Louis put pressure on Basin's relations and friends in order to force his resignation. After exile in various places Basin proceeded to Rome, and resigned his bishopric on 27 May 1474. Pope Sixtus IV bestowed upon him the title of archbishop of Caesarea by way of consolation. Occupied with his writings Basin then passed some years at Trier and afterwards transferred his residence to Utrecht (now in the Netherlands), where his old friend, David the bastard of Burgundy, was Bishop and lord of the city.

When Louis XI died in 1483, his successor Charles VIII invited Bishop Basin to return to France, but without his diocese he saw no reason to accept.

Basin died in Utrecht on 3 December 1491, and was buried in the church of St. John (Janskerk).

== Works ==
Basin's principal work is his Historiae de rebus a Carolo VII. et Ludovico XI. Francorum regibus. This is of considerable historical value, but is marred to some extent by the author's dislike for Louis XI. At one time it was regarded as the work of a priest of Liège, named Amelgard, but it is now practically certain that Basin was the writer. He also wrote a suggestion for reform in the administration of justice entitled Libellus de optimo ordine forenses lites audiendi et deferendi, which was the product of his careful study of the Roman Rota while he worked at the Curia; an Apologia, written to answer the charges brought against him by Louis XI; a Breviloquium, or allegorical account of his own misfortunes; a Peregrinatio; a defence of Joan of Arc entitled Opinio et consilium super processu et condemnatione Johanne, dicte Puelle and other miscellaneous writings. He wrote in French, Advis de Monseigneur de Lysieux au roi (1464).

Bishop Basin's cartulary survives, in the Library of Lisieux.

== Sources and further reading ==
- Honoré Jean P. Fisquet (1864). La France pontificale: Metropole de Rouen: Bayeux et Lisieux. Paris: E. Repos. pp. 286–291.
- Georgette de Groër (1984). "La formation de Thomas Basin en Italie et le début de sa carrière". Bibliothèque de l'École des Chartes (in French). 142 (2): 271–285. doi:10.3406/bec.1984.450344. JSTOR 42960206.
- Bernard Guenée (1991). Between Church and State: The Lives of Four French Prelates in the Late Middle Ages. University of Chicago Press. pp. 259–374. ISBN 978-0-226-31032-9.
- Adalbert Maurice (1953). Un Grand patriote, Thomas Basin, évêque de Lisieux, conseiller de Charles VII...: Sa vie et ses écrits... (in French). Imprimerie commerciale de la vigie de Dieppe.
- Jules Étienne Joseph Quicherat (ed.), Histoire des règnes de Charles VII et de Louis XI Tome IV, Paris, " J. Renouard et Cie. 1859. [contains the Breviloquium, the Projet de réforme..., the Mémoire pour le Rétablissement de la Pragmatique Sanction; and numerous documents]
- Charles Samaran (1933), "Documents inédits sur la jeunesse de Thomas Basin," Bibliothèque de l'École des chartes 94 (1933), pp. 46–57. (JSTOR) (in French)
- Charles Samaran et André Vernet (1976), "Les livres de Thomas Basin," Latomus 145 (1976), 324–339. (in French)
- Mark Spencer, Thomas Basin (1412–1490): The History of Charles VII and Louis XI. Nieuwkoop, Netherlands, De Graaf Publishers, 1997.
