= Méaulte =

- Commune
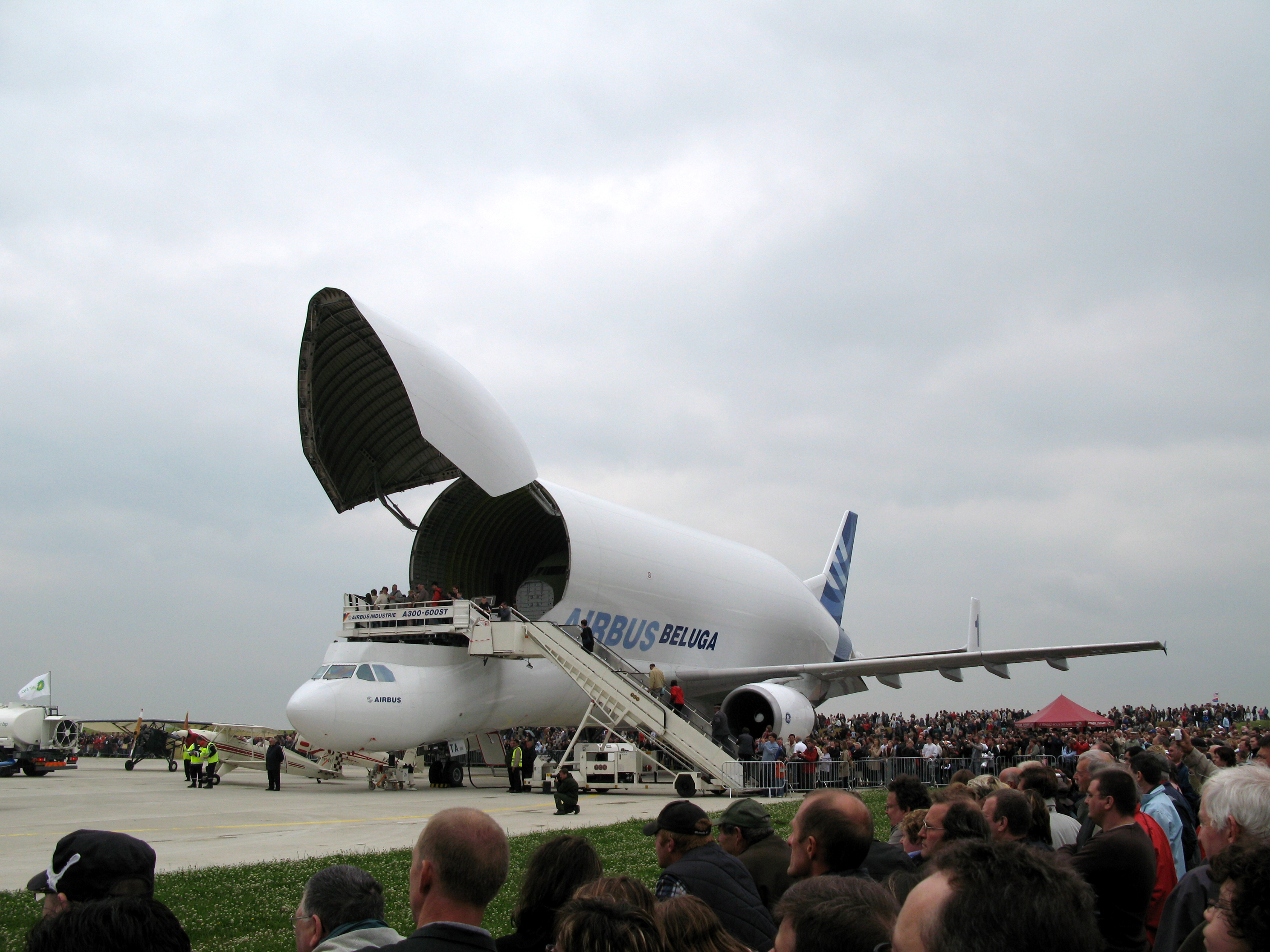
- Airbus Beluga no.1 at the Albert-Picardie airport
- Location of Méaulte
- Location within France Location within Hauts-de-France
- Coordinates: 49°58′56″N 2°39′39″E
- Country: France
- Region: Hauts-de-France
- Department: Somme
- Arrondissement: Péronne
- Canton: Albert
- Intercommunality: Pays du Coquelicot

Government
  - Mayor (2020–2026): Jean-Michel Fournier
- Area^{1}: 10.75 km^{2} (4.15 sq mi)
- Elevation: 86 m (282 ft)
- Highest elevation: 112 m (367 ft)
- Lowest elevation: 42 m (138 ft)
- Population (2023): 1,285
  - Density: 119.5/km^{2} (309.6/sq mi)
- Time zone: UTC+01:00 (CET)
  - Summer (DST): UTC+02:00 (CEST)
- INSEE/Postal code: 80523 /80300
- ^{1} French Land Register data, which excludes lakes, ponds, glaciers > 1 km^{2} (0.386 sq mi or 247 acres) and river estuaries.

Méaulte (French pronunciation: [meolt]) is a commune in the Somme department in Hauts-de-France in northern France.

== Geography ==
The commune is situated on the D329 road, some 20 miles (32 km) northeast of Amiens.

== Population ==
Historical population
Year	Pop.	±% p.a.
1968	1,048	—
1975	1,022	−0.36%
1982	1,074	+0.71%
1990	1,259	+2.01%
1999	1,254	−0.04%
2007	1,316	+0.61%
2012	1,312	−0.06%
2017	1,254	−0.90%
2023	1,285	+0.41%
Source: INSEE

== Personalities ==
- Henry Potez (1891–1981), aeroplane maker, was born in Méaulte. He built a factory here and began making Potez aeroplanes in 1924.
  Today, the factory is part of the pan-European group Airbus

== See also ==
- Communes of the Somme department
