= Lioré et Olivier LeO H-10 =

LeO H-10
- At the 1922 Paris Salon, one wing folded

General information
- Type: Naval reconnaissance floatplane
- National origin: France
- Manufacturer: Lioré et Olivier
- Number built: 1

History
- First flight: April 1923

The Lioré et Olivier LeO 10 or LeO H-10 was a prototype French Naval reconnaissance aircraft built. Only one example of this two seat, single engine biplane floatplane was built.

== Development ==
The LeO H-10 (H for hydravion or waterplane) was a two-seat floatplane designed for reconnaissance work from Naval vessels. It was an unstaggered biplane with unswept wings of constant chord that could be folded for ease of onboard stowage. The interplane strut arrangement was unusual: outboard, there were conventional upright pairs but just inboard of these another pair ran diagonally in Warren girder style, replacing the conventional flying wires. The lower wing folded at a rear hinge on a short stub wing; outboard of the break was a single vertical strut. Central cabane struts provided an upper hinge so the wings, with their trailing edges folded downwards, leaned inwards over the fuselage when stowed.

The fuselage of the LeO H.10 was a simple, flat sided structure with a water cooled Lorraine 12D V-12 engine in the nose. Twin wooden floats provided its landing gear. Only one was built, flying for the first time in April 1923.

== Specifications ==
Data from Flight, 18 January 1923

General characteristics

- Crew: Two
- Length: 10.45 m (34 ft 3 in)
- Wingspan: 15.0 m (49 ft 3 in)
- Height: 4.25 m (13 ft 11 in)
- Wing area: 59 m^{2} (640 sq ft)
- Empty weight: 1,705 kg (3,759 lb)
- Gross weight: 2,450 kg (5,401 lb)
- Fuel capacity: 295 kg (650 lb)
- Powerplant: 1 × Lorraine-Dietrich 12Da water cooled V-12 engine, 280 kW (375 hp)
- Propellers: 2-bladed

Performance

- Maximum speed: 160 km/h (99 mph, 86 kn) at 1,000 m (3,300 ft) estimated
- Service ceiling: 5,550 m (18,210 ft) service, estimated
- Wing loading: 42 kg/m^{2} (8.6 lb/sq ft)
- Power/mass: 0.07 hp/lb (110 W/kg)
