= Société Latham =

French aeronautical construction company

The Société Latham was a French aeronautical construction company which built seaplanes for the French Navy. It is best known for the prototype of the Latham 47 which disappeared in 1928 with Roald Amundsen on board during a rescue mission to the North Pole in search of Umberto Nobile (a memorial to which was set up in Caudebec-en-Caux in 1931, by the sculptor Robert Delandre and the architect Léon Rey).

The company was set up in 1916 at Caudebec-en-Caux, on the banks of the Seine by Jean Latham, cousin of Hubert Latham. In August 1933 it launched the Blériot 5190 seaplane, christened Santos-Dumont, equipped with Hispano-Suiza motors with a total horsepower of 650 ch. The company's work was based in Caudebec-en-Caux until a 1951 restructuring of the Latham, Bréguet and Potez companies, in which it was renamed REVIMA (Révision de Matériel Aéronautique) and merged into the Chargeurs Réunis group.

== Aircraft ==
- Latham 43
- Latham 47
