= Caproni Ca.71 =

1920s Italian fighter aircraft

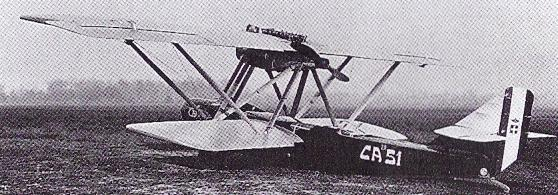

General information
- Type: Night fighter
- National origin: Italy
- Manufacturer: Caproni
- Number built: 1

History
- First flight: 1927
- Variant: Caproni Ca.70

The Caproni Ca.71, originally Ca.70L, was a two-seat biplane night fighter produced in Italy in 1927. It was derived from the Caproni Ca.70 of 1925.

== Design ==
Undaunted by the lack of interest the Regia Aeronautica (Italian Royal Air Force) had displayed in the Caproni Ca.70-night fighter after official tests in 1926, the Caproni company designed a derivative. It was initially designated the Ca.70L and then redesignated the Ca.71. Like the Ca.70, the Ca.71 was designed to ensure good low-speed handling and good visibility from both cockpits, without any of the aircraft's structural elements obstructing the view of either crewman. Its two wings were of unequal span, and it had tailskid landing gear, an unusual feature of which was an oleo-pneumatic shock absorber on the main landing gear, which allowed the wheels to travel forward in their linkage while the plane was taxiing. The armament consisted of two fixed forward-firing 7.7-millimeter Vickers machine guns and a flexible 7.7-millimeter Lewis machine gun on a Scarff ring in the rear cockpit.

The Ca.71 differed from the Ca.70 in engine installation. A pusher configuration replaced the Ca.70's tractor-mounted Bristol Jupiter engine, and the Ca.71 was designed to operate with various engines ranging from 298 to 373 kilowatts (400 to 500 horsepower). The lone Ca.71 built had a 298-kW (400-hp) 12-cylinder Lorraine-Dietrich Vee-type engine and was slightly heavier than the Ca.70, but otherwise was identical to the Ca.70.

== Operational history ==
The Ca.71 first flew in 1927. It was slightly slower and had a slightly lower rate of climb than the Ca.70, although its capacity to accommodate a more powerful engine may have allowed it to overcome this. At any rate, the Regia Aeronautica had no more interest in procuring the Ca.71 than it had in the Ca.70, and no further examples were built.

== Operators ==
Kingdom of Italy
Regia Aeronautica

== Specifications (Ca.71) ==
General characteristics

- Crew: 2
- Length: 9.55 m (31 ft 4 in)
- Wingspan: 15 m (49 ft 3 in)
- Height: 3.78 m (12 ft 5 in)
- Wing area: 55 m^{2} (590 sq ft)
- Empty weight: 1,310 kg (2,888 lb)
- Gross weight: 1,760 kg (3,880 lb)
- Powerplant: 1 × Lorraine-Dietrich 12Db V-12 water-cooled piston engine, 298 kW (400 hp)

Performance

- Maximum speed: 200 km/h (120 mph, 110 kn)
- Rate of climb: 3.92 m/s (772 ft/min)
- Time to altitude: 4,000 m (13,123 ft) in 17 minutes

Armament

- Guns: *2 × fixed, forward-firing 7.7 mm (.303 in) Vickers machine guns
- 1 x flexible 7.7 mm (.303 in) Lewis machine gun in rear cockpit

== See also ==
- Caproni Ca.70
