= Caproni Ca.70 =

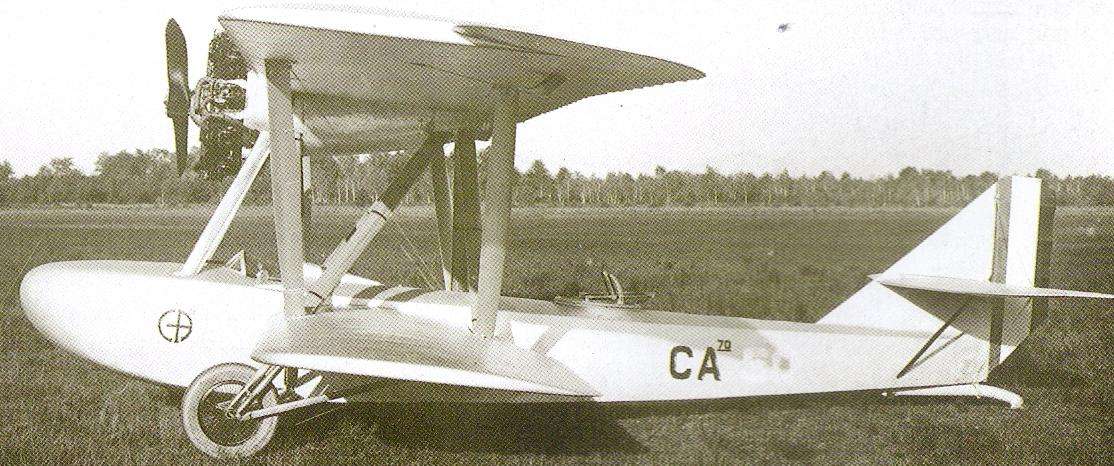

General information
- Type: Night fighter
- National origin: Italy
- Manufacturer: Caproni
- Number built: 1

History
- First flight: 1925
- Variant: Caproni Ca.71

The Caproni Ca.70 was a two-seat night fighter and ground attack biplane produced in Italy in 1925. It was the only Italian aircraft designed from the outset as a night fighter.

== Design ==
The Caproni company designed the Ca.70 to ensure good low-speed handling and good visibility from both cockpits, without any of the aircraft's structural elements obstructing the view of either crewman. Its two wings were of unequal span, and it had tailskid landing gear, an unusual feature of which was an oleo-pneumatic shock absorber on the main landing gear which allowed the wheels to travel forward in their linkage while the plane was taxiing. The 9-cylinder, 313-kilowatt (420-horsepower) Bristol Jupiter radial engine gave the Ca.70 a top speed of 205 kilometers (127 mi) per hour. Armament consisted of two fixed forward-firing 7.7-millimeter Vickers machine guns and a flexible 7.7-millimeter Lewis machine gun on a Scarff ring in the rear cockpit.

== Operational history ==
The Ca.70 first flew in 1925. After the Caproni company finished its tests, it turned the aircraft over to the Regia Aeronautica (Italian Royal Air Force), which tested it at Guidonia Montecelio in 1926, and the Ca.70 performed well, with good handling and performance. However, the Regia Aeronautica had little interest in procuring a two-seat night fighter, and no further examples were built.

Caproni used the design of the Ca.70 for as the basis for a derivative, the Caproni Ca.71 prototype of 1927.

== Operators ==
Kingdom of Italy
Regia Aeronautica

== Specifications (Ca.70) ==
General characteristics

- Crew: 2
- Length: 9.55 m (31 ft 4 in)
- Wingspan: 15 m (49 ft 3 in)
- Height: 3.78 m (12 ft 5 in)
- Wing area: 55 m^{2} (590 sq ft)
- Empty weight: 1,230 kg (2,712 lb)
- Gross weight: 1,680 kg (3,704 lb)
- Powerplant: × Bristol Jupiter 9-cyl. air-cooled radial piston engine, 313 kW (420 hp)

Performance

- Maximum speed: 205 km/h (127 mph, 111 kn)
- Endurance: 2 hours
- Rate of climb: 4.76 m/s (937 ft/min)
- Time to altitude: 4,000 m (13,123 ft) in 14 minutes

Armament

- Guns: * 2 × fixed, forward-firing 7.7 mm (.303 in) Vickers machine guns
- 1 x flexible 7.7 mm (.303 in) Lewis machine gun in rear cockpit

== See also ==
- Caproni Ca.71
