= Latham 47 =

French twin-engined flying boat

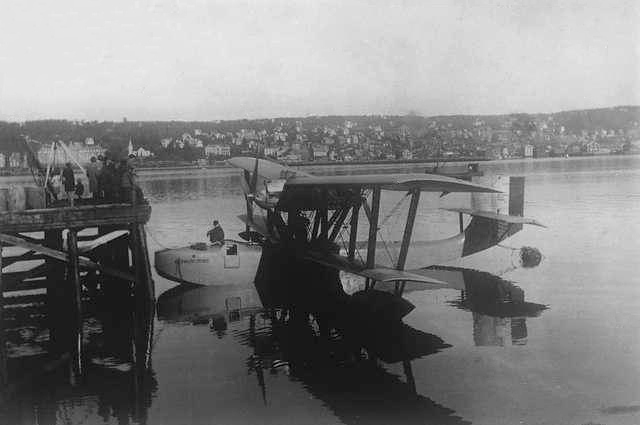
- Roald Amundsen's Latham 47.02 shortly before take-off on 18 June 1928.

General information
- Type: Twin-engined reconnaissance or bomber flying boat
- Manufacturer: Latham
- Primary user: French Navy
- Number built: 16

History
- Introduction date: 1929
- First flight: 1928

The Latham 47, or Latham R3B4 in Naval service was a French twin-engine flying boat designed and built by Société Latham & Cie for the French Navy. The aircraft achieved notoriety in 1928 when aircraft number 47.02 disappeared with the explorer Roald Amundsen on a rescue mission for the Italian explorer Umberto Nobile.

== Design and development ==
The Latham 47 was designed to meet a French Navy requirement for a long-range flying boat with a transatlantic capability. The prototype appeared in 1928, although it was lost in a fire after two flights. The Type 47 was a large biplane powered by two Farman 12We engines mounted in tandem below the upper wing. The pilot and co-pilot sat side by side in an open cockpit, two further machine gun-equipped cockpits were located in the nose and amidships. Twelve production aircraft were built and delivered to the Navy. Two further aircraft were built as the Latham 47P as civilian mail carriers with Hispano-Suiza 12Y engines. The 47Ps were used on Mediterranean routes until 1932.

== Variants ==
Type 47.01
First Latham 47 prototype.
Type 47.02
Second Latham 47 prototype.
Type 47
Two prototypes and twelve production military aircraft, designated R3B4 in service, indicating three seat reconnaissance or four seat bomber.
Type 47P
Civilian mail carriers, two built.

== Operators ==
France

- French Navy
  - Escadrille 3E1
  - Escadrille 4R1

== Accidents and incidents ==
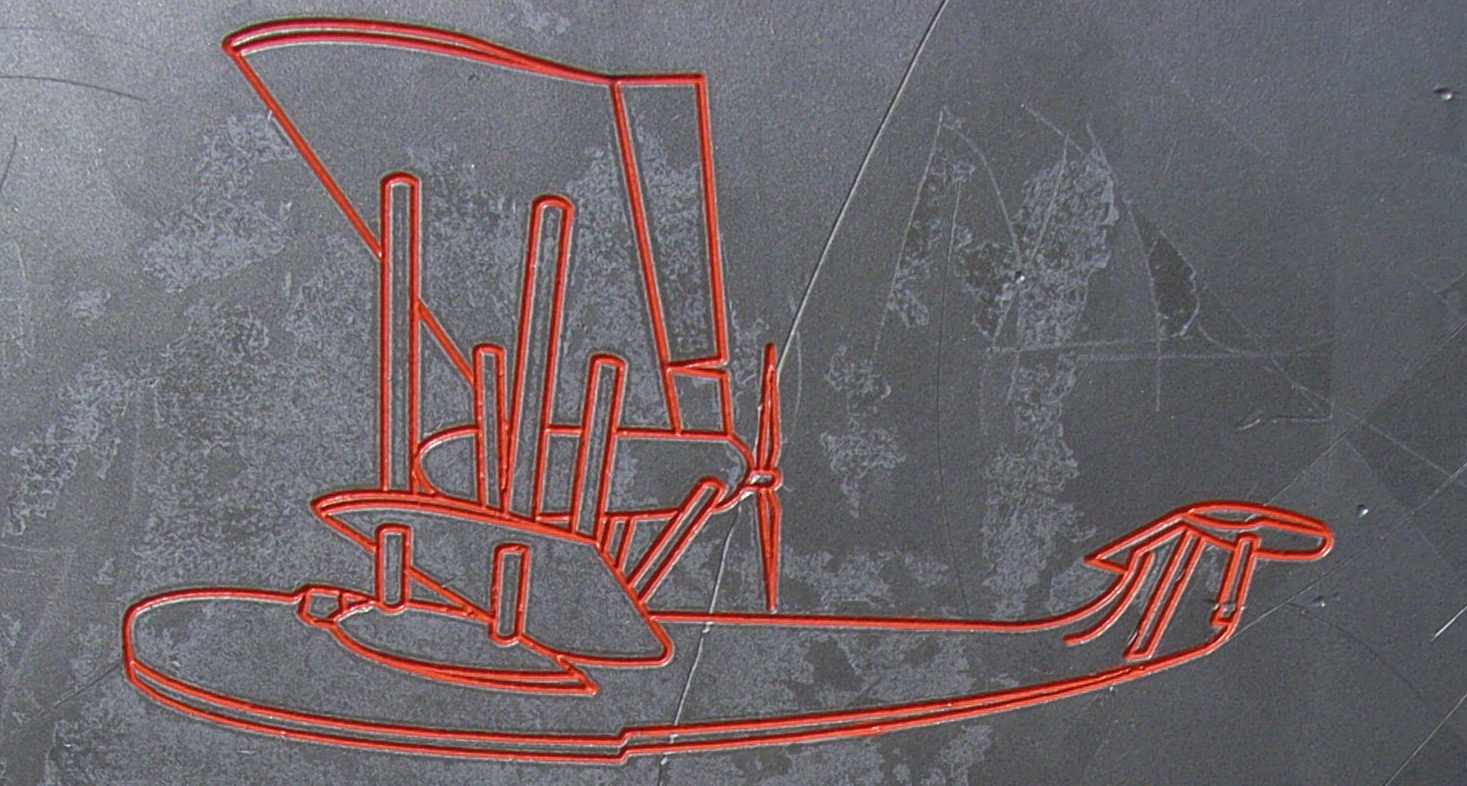
Drawing of a Latham 47 on the memorial in Calais for Gilbert Brazy, the air mechanic lost on the flight

On 6 June 1928 the Latham 47.02 was tasked to help search for the airship Italia which earlier on 25 May 1928 had crashed on pack ice in the Arctic Ocean just north of Spitsbergen. The aircraft, piloted by Norwegian Leif Dietrichson and Frenchman René Guilbaud, picked up the explorer Roald Amundsen and a colleague at Bergen. On 18 June the aircraft left Tromsø, Norway to fly across the Barents Sea; it disappeared without a trace until, on 31 August the same year, the torn-off port float was found off the coast of Troms and, in October, a large gasoline tank was found on Haltenbanken.

== Specifications (Type 47) ==
Data from The Illustrated Encyclopedia of Aircraft (Part Work 1982–1985). Orbis Publishing. pp. 2296–7.

General characteristics

- Crew: 4
- Wingspan: 25.20 m (82 ft 8 in)
- Gross weight: 6,886 kg (15,180 lb)
- Powerplant: 2 × Farman 12We , 373 kW (500 hp) each

Performance

- Maximum speed: 170 km/h (106 mph, 92 kn)
- Range: 900 km (559 mi, 486 nmi)

Armament

- 2 x twin 7.7 mm (0.303 in) machine-guns
- 600kg (1323lb) bombs

== See also ==
Related lists

- List of Interwar military aircraft
- List of flying boats and floatplanes

== Bibliography ==
- Passingham, Malcolm (November–December 1999). "Latham's 'Boats: Pictorial History of the Designs of Jean Latham". Air Enthusiast (84): 22–27. ISSN 0143-5450.
