= Caudebec-en-Caux =

- Part of Rives-en-Seine
- Brotonne Bridge
- Location of Caudebec-en-Caux
- Location within France Location within Normandy
- Coordinates: 49°31′38″N 0°43′37″E
- Country: France
- Region: Normandy
- Department: Seine-Maritime
- Arrondissement: Rouen
- Canton: Notre-Dame-de-Gravenchon
- Commune: Rives-en-Seine
- Area^{1}: 4.93 km^{2} (1.90 sq mi)
- Elevation: 5 m (16 ft)
- Highest elevation: 116 m (381 ft)
- Lowest elevation: 1 m (3.3 ft)
- Population (2022): 2,232
  - Density: 453/km^{2} (1,170/sq mi)
- Time zone: UTC+01:00 (CET)
  - Summer (DST): UTC+02:00 (CEST)
- Postal code: 76490
- ^{1} French Land Register data, which excludes lakes, ponds, glaciers > 1 km^{2} (0.386 sq mi or 247 acres) and river estuaries.

Caudebec-en-Caux (French pronunciation: [kodbɛk ɑ̃ ko], literally Caudebec in Caux) is a former commune in the Seine-Maritime department in the Normandy region in northern France. On 1 January 2016, it was merged into the new commune of Rives-en-Seine.

== Geography ==
Caudebec-en-Caux is located 27 miles (43 km) W.N.W. of Rouen, on the right bank of the River Seine. The tidal bore in the estuary of the Seine which is known as the mascaret in French, but locally as the barre, used to be well seen at this point. The development of the industrial polder towards Harfleur has changed the geometry of the estuary so that mascaret now seems to be a phenomenon of the past.

Since 1977 Caudebec has been served by the Pont de Brotonne, one of three bridges built across the Seine, downstream from Rouen since 1960, to replace the many ferries so making vehicular access between the Pays de Caux and the Autoroute A13 easier.

== History ==
Caudebec is one of numerous places in Normandy having names which are clearly derived from a Scandinavian language. Caldebec c. 1025 (like Caldbeck, Caldebeck 1060, Cumberland) derives from the old Danish kaldr bekkr: cold stream or cold brook.

In May 1592 during the French Wars of Religion Caudebec had been taken by the Spanish and French Catholic League forces of the Duke of Parma but the Duke was trapped by an army under Henry IV of France. Though wounded the Duke then made a miraculous escape avoiding complete defeat but died at Arras.

=== Heraldry ===
Arms of Caudebec-en-Caux (Seine-Maritime)	formerly: Azure, 3 smelt argent. now: Azure, in pale 3 salmon argent.

== Sights ==
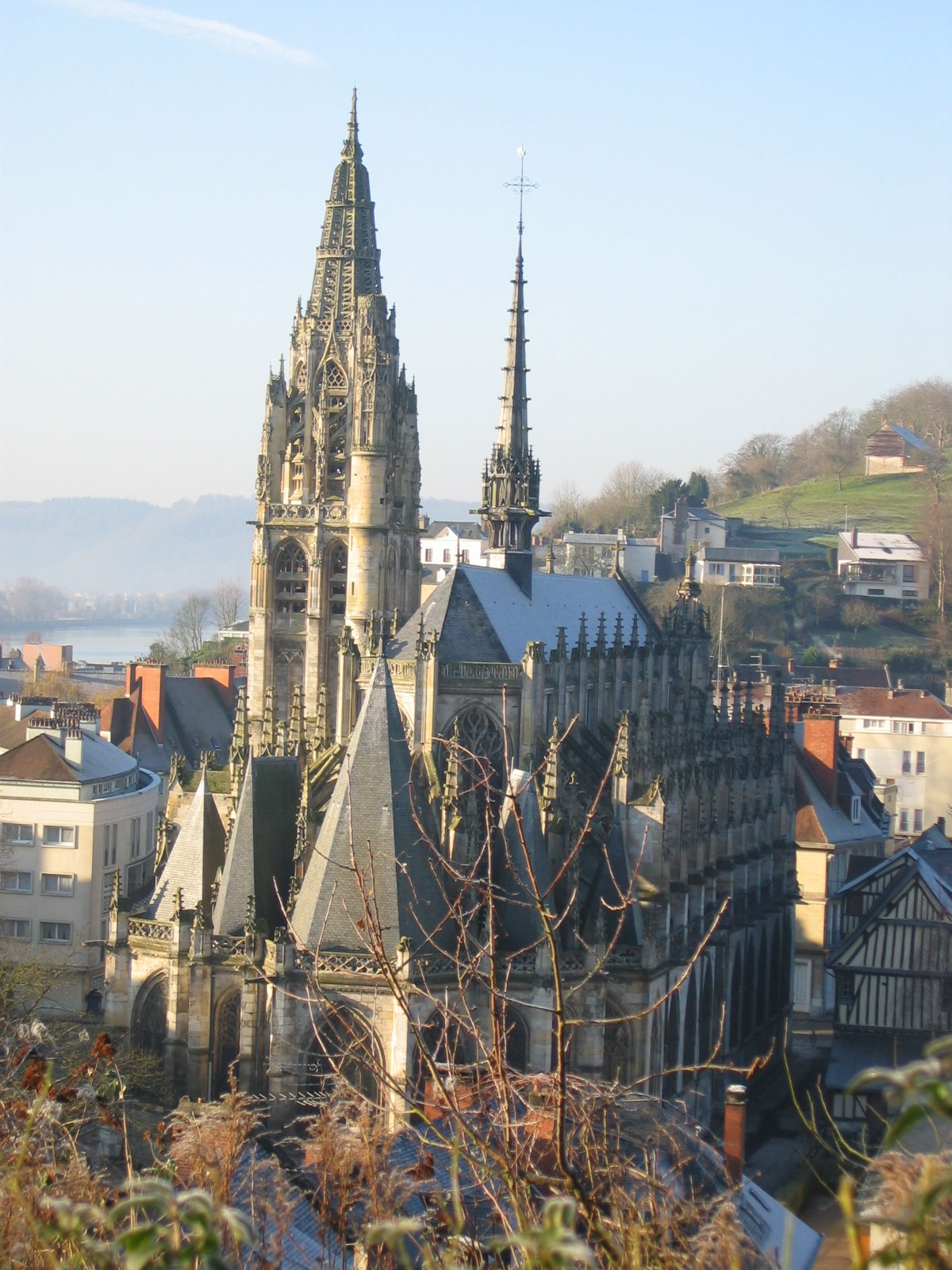
The Notre-Dame Church of Caudebec-en-Caux. Notice in the background, the slope down from the chalk plateau of the Pays de Caux to the Seine estuary.

The chief architectural interest of the town lies in its Flamboyant church, which was constructed during the 15th and the early 16th centuries. Round its top run balustrades formed of Gothic letters, which read as part of the Magnificat. Its west portal, the decoration of the spire of the tower, and its stained glass are among the features which make it one of the finest churches of the Rouen diocese.

- In the town are also
  - Maison des Templiers (The Templars' House) from the twelfth and thirteenth centuries. The building was saved by a society set up for the purpose and houses a small museum of local archaeology and history. A domestic building of this period is a rarity.
  - The former prison from the fourteenth century.
  - Hôtel du Bailli, a town house.
  - Hôtel de ville (Town Hall) from around 1800.
  - The riverside embankments (Les Quais).
  - Musée de la marine de Seine, on the history of river navigation.
- Just outside the town:
  - Château d'Etelan a renaissance château overlooking the final loop of the river Seine
  - The short length of riverside road between Caudebec and St Wandrille, passes under the Pont de Brotonne, a high-level cable-stayed bridge.
  - Monument du Latham 47
  - Fontenelle Abbey (Abbaye de Saint-Wandrille), in the nearby village of Saint-Wandrille-Rançon.

== Economy ==
Historically, its industries included tanning and leather-currying, and there was trade in grain. The port had a small trade in coal, livestock and farm produce. Caudebec was formerly the location of the French seaplane manufacturer Latham.

== Caudebec-en-Caux in fiction ==
- Caudebec-en-Caux (though shortened to 'Caudebec') is the site of the death of the character Captain William Bush, in C.S. Forester's novel Lord Hornblower, part of the popular Horatio Hornblower series set during the Napoleonic Wars. Bush, Hornblower's loyal companion for much of the series, was killed due to an explosion in a minor military operation in the Seine estuary near to the town of Caudebec.
- Much of the action in They Wouldn't Be Chessmen by A. E. W. Mason takes place in Caudebec.

== Notable people ==
- Alain de Buckland (1045-1108), a Norman settler of England, was born here.
- Anthony Ashley-Cooper, 10th Earl of Shaftesbury was raised here after his father, the 9th Earl of Shaftesbury died in 1947. The 10th Earl's mother was the French-born Françoise Soulier, daughter of Georges Soulier.
- Thomas Basin, historian, was born here in 1412.
- François Duprat (1941–1978), French writer, was killed here.
- Raymond Narac (born 1967), racing driver
- Jeannine Richer (1924-2022), author and composer
- Hippolyte Sebron (1801-1879), painter and associate of Louis Daguerre, was born here.

== See also ==
- Communes of the Seine-Maritime department
