= Gustave Douchy =

Gustav Douchy
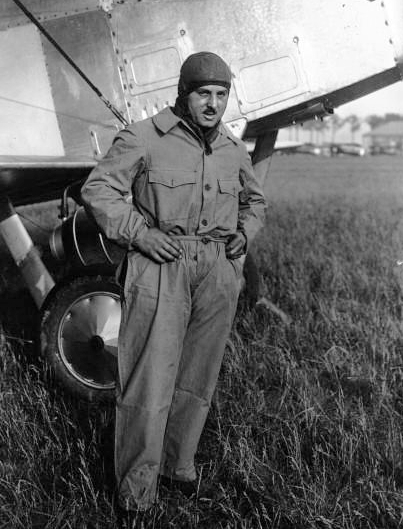
- Born: 14 May 1893; Bondy
- Died: 29 July 1943 (aged 50)
- Military career
- Allegiance: France
- Branch: Aviation
- Rank: Capitaine
- Units: 1e Groupe d'Aeronautique, 1e Groupe d'Aviation, Escadrille 38
- Awards: Légion d'honneur, Médaille militaire, Croix de Guerre with seven palmes and an étoile de vermeil, Mentioned in Dispatches seven times

Capitaine Gustav Douchy (1893-1943) was a French military officer who served in both World Wars. He was a flying ace in World War I, credited with nine confirmed aerial victories.

== Early life ==
Gustav Douchy was born on 14 May 1893 in Bondy.

== World War I ==
Gustav Douchy was conscripted on 27 November 1913. He was assigned to aviation, and passed through two different units before being stationed at Nancy as an aircraft mechanic on 29 January 1914. On 11 May 1915, he began pilot's training at Avord. On 15 July, he received his Military Pilot's Brevet. On 28 August 1915, he was promoted to Corporal. On 24 October 1915, he was assigned to Escadrille 38. On 12 November 1915, he received Pilot's Brevet No. 2514. On 21 February 1916, he was promoted to Sergeant.

On 25 July 1916, Douchy scored his first German two-seater reconnaissance aircraft, followed on 23 August 1916 by an Albatros aircraft. The two victories were instrumental in winning him the Médaille militaire, which was awarded 24 September. On 21 November 1916, he was promoted yet again, to Adjutant.

On 22 January 1917, Douchy resumed scoring, downing an Albatros two-seater near Navarin. He accumulated wins one at a time until 4 September 1917, when he tallied his eighth victory. On 19 October 1917, he was awarded the Légion d'honneur.

On 6 March 1918, Douchy scored his last confirmed victory. Twenty days later, he was then withdrawn from combat, and assigned test pilot duty.

== Post World War I ==
On 23 August 1925, Douchy was elevated to Officer in the Légion d'honneur; eventually, he rose to Commandeur. In 1926, he joined the French aircraft manufacturer Société des Avions Michel Wibault, being employed as a test pilot by them until 1929. In 1932, he joined the airline Air Orient as an airline pilot, based in Damascus. He transferred to Air France when the airline was formed in 1933, returning to France in 1934.

On 1 February 1942, during World War II, he was promoted to Capitaine. On 29 July 1943, he died as the result of an accident while he was in Madagascar.
