= Henry Potez =

French aircraft manufacturer (1891–1981)

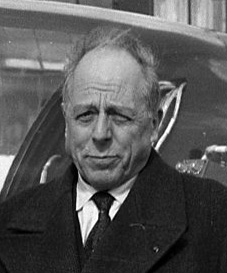
- Born: Henry Charles Alexandre Potez; 30 September 1891; Méaulte
- Died: 9 November 1981 (aged 90); 16th arrondissement of Paris
- Awards: Grand Cross of the National Order of Merit; Grand Officer of the Legion of Honour; Aeronautical Medal

Henry Potez (Méaulte, 30 September 1891 – Paris, 9 November 1981) was a French aircraft industrialist.

He studied in the French Aeronautics School Supaéro. With Marcel Dassault, he was the inventor of the Potez-Bloch propeller which, after 1917, have been set on most of all Allied planes of World War I.

In 1919, he founded his own company, Aviations Potez, that, between the wars, built many planes and seaplanes, in factories which were at that time considered the most modern in the world. He bought the Alessandro Anzani company in 1923. Many Potez planes, such as the Potez 25, 39, 54, 62, 63, were an international success, setting world records.

Over the course of twenty years, 7,000 planes left the production lines. Forty prototypes were designed and more than twenty passed to production - this was remarkable at that time.

In 1936, his factories, considered to be strategic, were nationalised by the French Front populaire government.

After the Second World War, Potez purchased a controlling interest in Air-Fouga who designed and produced the Magister, a two-seat twin engined trainer aircraft, which was a big success.

== See also ==
- Domaine du Rayol, his villa on the Côte d'Azur
