= Lorraine-Dietrich aero-engines =

French automobile and aircraft engine manufacturer

Lorraine-Dietrich was a French automobile and aircraft engine manufacturer from 1896 until 1935, created when railway locomotive manufacturer Société Lorraine des Anciens Etablissments de Dietrich and Cie (known as De Dietrich et Cie, founded in 1884 by Jean de Dietrich) branched into the manufacture of automobiles. The Franco-Prussian War divided the company's manufacturing capacity, one plant in Niederbronn-les-Bains, Alsace, the other in Lunéville, Lorraine.

== Aircraft engines ==
=== Designations ===
==== Letter system ====
The Service technique de l'aéronautique (STAé) used a common designation system for the vast majority of their engines, which signified the major attributes of the particular engines:

1. 12 – the number of cylinders in any configuration (V, straight, W, horizontally opposed, radial, etc. etc.).
2. Y – the family letter in capitals (note: in at least two instances the family designator consisted of two letters in capitals e.g. 14AA and 14AB), advancing alphabetically.
3. a – sub variant indicator, (which could also indicate the rotation of the engine, where otherwise identical engines with opposite hand rotation were built, e.g. 12Ndr anti-clockwise and 12Nfr clockwise).
4. r – attribute indicators, denoting various attributes that the engine might have, (r = reduction gearing, i = fuel injection, s = supercharged, etc. etc.)
5. 1 – sub-sub variants were denoted by using a number after the letters, (e.g. 12Xhrs and 12Xhrs1), usually indicating differences in ancillary equipment.

Thus the 12Xgrs was of the X family, with reduction gearing and supercharger. Whereas the 12Xhrs was identical but rotated in the opposite direction.

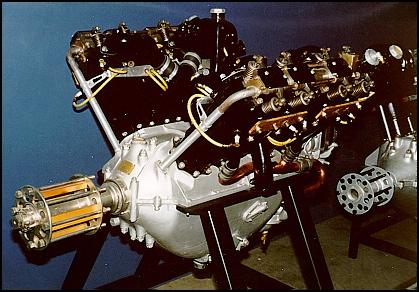
Lorraine-Dietrich 8Be aircraft engine.

Source:Jane's All the World's Aircraft 1938 except where noted

Lorraine 3D
licence-built Potez 3B
Lorraine 5P
5 cyl radial
5Pa:75 kW (100 hp)
5Pb:82 kW (110 hp)
5pc:89 kW (120 hp)
Lorraine 6A
(AM) 82 kW (110 hp)
Lorraine 6Ba
6 cyl two-row radial 97 kW (130 hp)
Lorraine 7M Mizar
7 cyl radial 180 kW (240 hp)
7Ma
7Me
Lorraine 8A
V-8
8Aa
8Ab
8Aby
Lorraine 8B
V-8
8Ba
8Bb
8Bd
8Be
Lorraine-Latécoère 8B
Lorraine 9N Algol
Type 120 9 cyl radial 220 kW (300 hp)
Lorraine Algol Junior
170 kW (230 hp)
Lorraine Algol Major
350 kW (470 hp)
Lorraine Dietrich 12Cc
Dc in error?
Lorraine 12? Hibis
340 kW (450 hp)
Lorraine Dietrich 12Cc
Dc in error?
Lorraine 12D
V-12
12Da
12Db
12Dc
Lorraine 12 DOO
horizontally-opposed O-12
Lorraine 12E Courlis
W-12 340 kW (450 hp)
12Eb:
12Ebr:
12Ed:
12Edr:
12Ee:
12Ew:The standard Eb fitted with a supplementary supercharger
Lorraine 12F Courlis
W-12 450 kW (600 hp)
Lorraine 12H Pétrel
V-12
Lorraine 12Q Eider
12Qo
Lorraine 12R Sterna
V-12 Type 111 520 kW (700 hp)
12Rs:V-12 Type 111 520 kW (700 hp)
Lorraine 12Rcr Radium
inverted V-12 with turbochargers 220 kW (300 hp)
Lorraine 14A Antarès
14 cylinder radial 370 kW (500 hp)
14Ac:14 cylinder radial 370 kW (500 hp)
Lorraine 14E
14 cylinder radial 350 kW (470 hp) (could be mis-typing of 14Ae, or someone unfamiliar with the designation system writing 14E for Etoile – star - radial)
Lorraine 14L Antarès
14 cylinder radial 370 kW (500 hp) (could be mis-typing of 14Al)
Lorraine 18F Sirius
Type 112
18F.0:
18F.00:
18F.100:
Lorraine 18G Orion
W-18
18Ga:W-18
18Gad:W-18
Lorraine 18K
W-18
18Ka
18Kd
18Kdrs
Lorraine 24
W-24 750 kW (1,000 hp)
Lorraine 24E Taurus
24-cyl in-line radial (six banks of 4-inline) 1,200 kW (1,600 hp)
Lorraine AM
(moteur d’Aviation Militaire (A.M.)) – derived from German 6-cyl in-line engines
Lorraine Diesel
built in 1932, rated at 150 kW (200 hp)
Lorraine DM-400

== Applications ==
Data from:Les moteurs d'Lorraine

1914 6A
(A.M. -Aviation Militaire):
Farman F.40
1915 8Aa
Lorraine AM (Marine)
FBA Type C (Italian)
1915 8Aby
Donnet-Denhaut
FBA Type H
1916 8Ba
Donnet-Denhaut prototypes
FBA Type S
1916 12D
Hallbronn HT2
Latécoère 5
Latécoère 16
1917 12Da
CAMS-37
Latham 43
Lioré et Olivier H-10
SEA IV
Potez 7
Potez 9
Potez 12
Farman 120
Percheron 18
1917 8Bb
Nieuport 28
Tellier 1100
1918 12Db
Besson MB-26
Latham E5
Lioré et Olivier LeO 12
Levasseur PL3
Potez 11
Potez 15
Potez 17
Potez 23
Potez 27
Farman 60
Farman 62
Farman 3bis
Farman 122
Farman 150bis
Farman Super Goliath
1918 8Bd & 8Be
Nieuport 28
SPAD S XVI
Potez 18/1
Potez 21
Latécoère 15
Latécoère 18
Latécoère 22
1919 12Dc
Bernard 10T
Farman 72
Lioré et Olivier H-10
1922 12Eb & 12Ebr
Bernard V1
Breguet 19
Breguet 281T
CAMS- 37
Dewoitine D.12
Dewoitine D.14
Schreck FBA 21
GourdouLeseurre 33
Farman F.62 Goliath
SPAD 61/2
Nieuport-Delage NiD-44
Lioré et Olivier H-134
Lioré et Olivier 191
Levasseur PL4
Levasseur PL5
Levasseur PL8
Potez 25TOE
Potez 25/55
Potez 29
Villiers 4
Villiers 9
Villiers 10
1923 7Ma & 7Mb
Potez 32/2
Farman 75
1924 14Ac Antarès
Potez 29/6
1925 5Pa
Farman 232/1
1926 Lorraine 5Pb5Pb
Potez 36/23
Farman 204
Farman 352/2
Farman 402
Farman 405
Farman 480
Farman 1020
1927 5Pc
Schreck FBA 310
Farman 203
Farman 401
1927 12F Courlis:Potez 25/67
Potez 50
1927 18K, 18Kb, 18Kc 18Kd
Amiot 122
1928 7Me Mizar
CAMS 90
LeO H-222
Potez 33/1
Schreck FBA 171
Farman 197
Farman 306
1928 9Na Algol
Bernard 161
Bloch 120
Lioré et Olivier LeO-251
Schreck FBA 270
Potez 33/4
Potez 402
Farman 199
Farman 304
1928 14L
?
1929 18Ga Orion
Amiot 121
Amiot 122BP
Amiot 126
1930 12Rcr Radium
Nieuport-Delage NiD-651
Bernard HV-220
1930 12Hars
Potez 39/1bis
1930 12Q Eider
Amiot transatlantique
1931 12Hdrs
Nieuport-Delage NiD-121
123

== Specifications ==
Data from: This table gives the major attributes of each engine model, where known.

Model	Bore	Stroke	Capacity	Comp.	Wt. dry	T/O pr	T/O rpm	S. charger	Red. gear	Rated pr	Rated rpm	Rated alt	Comments
14A	140 mm (5.51 in)	150 mm (5.91 in)	32.326 L (1,972.65 cu in)	5	453 kg (998.7 lb)	430 kW (570 hp)	1,900	n	0.647:1 / DD	370 kW (500 hp)-->		S/L	14 cylinder radial - Antares
12Ed	120 mm (4.72 in)	180 mm (7.09 in)	24.42 L (1,490.20 cu in)	6	Direct drive:373 kg (822.3 lb); geared 413 kg (910.5 lb)	362 kW (485 hp)	2,500	n	? / DD	340 kW (450 hp)	1,800	S/L	water-cooled W-12 - Courlis
12Fa	145 mm (5.71 in)	160 mm (6.30 in)	31.7 L (1,934.45 cu in)	6	Direct drive:423 kg (932.6 lb); geared 451 kg (994.3 lb)	520 kW (700 hp)		n	? / DD	450 kW (600 hp)	2,000	S/L	water-cooled W-12 – Courlis
Lorraine 18G	125 mm (4.92 in)	180 mm (7.09 in)	39.76 L (2,426.30 cu in)	6:1	569 kg (1,254.4 lb)	614 kW (823 hp)	2000 rpm	n	DD	520 kW (700 hp)		S/L	W-18 Orion
Lorraine 12H	145 mm (5.71 in)	145 mm (5.71 in)	28.8 L (1,757.48 cu in)	6:1	369 kg (813.5 lb)	570 kW (760 hp)	2000 rpm	n	DD	370 kW (500 hp)		S/L	V-12 Pétrel
Lorraine 18K	120 mm (4.72 in)	180 mm (7.09 in)	36.63 L (2,235.30 cu in)	6:1	584 kg (1,287.5 lb)	536 kW (719 hp)	2000 rpm	n	geared	480 kW (650 hp)		S/L	W-18
7Ma	140 mm (5.51 in)	150 mm (5.91 in)	16.163 L (986.33 cu in)	5	265 kg (584.2 lb)	211 kW (283 hp)	1,800	n	DD	180 kW (240 hp)-->		S/L	7 cylinder radial – Mizar
9Na	140 mm (5.51 in)	150 mm (5.91 in)	20.78 L (1,268.07 cu in)	5	296 kg (652.6 lb)	280 kW (370 hp)	1,800	n	DD	180 kW (240 hp)-->		S/L	9 cylinder radial – Algol
5Pa	125 mm (4.92 in)	140 mm (5.51 in)	8.59 L (524.19 cu in)	5	156 kg (343.9 lb)	81 kW (108 hp)	1,350	n	DD	75 kW (100 hp)		S/L	5 cylinder radial
5Pb	125 mm (4.92 in)	140 mm (5.51 in)	8.59 L (524.19 cu in)	5	158 kg (348.3 lb)	95 kW (128 hp)	1,650	n	DD	93 kW (125 hp)		S/L	5 cylinder radial
5Pc	130 mm (5.12 in)	140 mm (5.51 in)	9.3 L (567.52 cu in)	5	161 kg (354.9 lb)	110 kW (150 hp)	1,700	n	DD	89 kW (120 hp)		S/L	5 cylinder radial
Lorraine 12Q	170 mm (6.69 in)	165 mm (6.50 in)	44.9 L (2,739.97 cu in)	6:1	Direct drive:580 kg (1,278.7 lb); geared 635 kg (1,399.9 lb)	780 kW (1,050 hp)	2200 rpm	n	DD	670 kW (900 hp)		S/L	V-12 Eider
