= Potez 506 =

Potez 501 modified to set altitude records in the 1930s

General information
- Type: Altitude record holder
- National origin: France
- Manufacturer: Henry Potez

History
- Developed from: Potez 50

The Potez 506 was a version of the Potez 501 French single engine observation aircraft, specially modified to capture the World absolute altitude record. In September 1933 it set a new record at 13,661 m (44,820 ft).

== Design and development ==
The Potez 506 was a modification of the Potez 501 observation/bomber aircraft, itself derived via the Potez 50 from the widely used Potez 25, first flown in 1926. In 1932 Cyril Uwins set a world altitude record of 13,404 m (43,976 ft) in a Vickers Vespa VII, which the Potez 506 was designed to better. Flown by Gustave Lemoine, it reached 13,661 m (44,820 ft) on 28 September 1933, an altitude limited by icing of the pilot's eyes as he sat in his open cockpit. He used oxygen but had no pressure suit. The flight, made from Villacoublay, lasted 2 hrs 5min.

The record breaking airframe began as a Potez 501, which was the Potez 50 with its inline, water-cooled 520 kW (700 hp) Lorraine 12Fd Courlis replaced by a 520 kW (700 hp) Gnome-Rhone 14Kbrs Mistral Major radial engine. The Potez 506 had a similar 14-cylinder. two row radial engine, the Gnome-Rhone 14Kdrs Mistral Major, which had its power increased to 600 kW (800 hp) at sea level by an increase in compression ratio from 5.5 to 7.25 and an improved supercharger which could maintain this output to 6,000 m (19,685 ft). It drove a three blade propeller. In addition, the upper wing span was increased by 26% to 18.6 m (61 ft 0 in) and its area by a little more. 100 kg (220 lb) of empty weight savings were made. The pilot sat in the rear cockpit, rather than from his usual forward position which was covered over and used to house the barographs and batteries. Like all of the Potez 25 derived aircraft, the 506 had an all wood structure with fabric covering apart from around the engine and was a single bay sesquiplane with shorter, narrower chord lower wings and outward leaning interplane struts.

Lemoine later reached 14,400 m (47,400 ft) in the 506. On 11 April 1934 the Italian Renato Donati raised the altitude record to 14,433 m (47,352 ft) in a much modified Caproni Ca.113 aircraft, wearing a pressure suit. Both pilots considered further records attempts and Dorati also experimented with pressure suits. On 14 August 1936 Détré flew the 506 to 14,843 m (48,698 ft). The same aircraft was flown by Maryse Hilsz to set a new women's fixed-wing aircraft altitude record of 14,310 m (46,950 ft) on 7 July 1937 which still stood in 1948.

== Specifications (for record flight) ==
Data from Flight 19 October 1933 p.1043

General characteristics

- Crew: One
- Length: 9.40 m (30 ft 10 in)
- Upper wingspan: 18.60 m (61 ft 0 in)
- Height: 3.63 m (11 ft 11 in)
- Wing area: 54 m^{2} (580 sq ft)
- Empty weight: 1,522 kg (3,355 lb) with instruments, fuel and oil
- Gross weight: 1,883 kg (4,151 lb) at record take-off
- Fuel capacity: 198 kg (437 lb)
- Powerplant: 1 × Gnome-Rhone 14Kdrs Mistral Major 14-cylinder double row radial, 600 kW (800 hp) at sea level. A supercharger turning at 10.92×engine speed maintained this power to 6,000 m (19,685 ft). Output geared down 3:2. Compression ratio 7.25.
- Propellers: 3-bladed Gnome-Rhone

Performance

- Service ceiling: 13,661 m (44,820 ft) record

== Bibliography ==
- Détré, Georges (March 1971). "J'ai piloté le Potez 506 à 15.000 m." [I Flew the Potez 506 to 15,000 Meters]. Le Album de Fanatique de l'Aviation (in French) (20): 23–28. ISSN 0757-4169.
- Roux, Robert (March 1971). "De 1933 à 1936, il permit de battre trois records d'altitude" [From 1933 to 1936, It Broke Three Altitude Records]. Le Album de Fanatique de l'Aviation (in French) (20): 23–25. ISSN 0757-4169.
