= Morane-Saulnier MS.250 =

1920s French training aircraft

MS.250

General information
- Type: trainer
- Manufacturer: Morane-Saulnier
- Number built: 2

History
- First flight: 1929

The Morane-Saulnier MS.250 was a crew-trainer aircraft built by Morane-Saulnier in the late 1920s.

== Design ==
The MS.250 was a parasol-wing monoplane with swept-back wings, similar to the Morane-Saulnier MS.230, but differed in having a new tail. The cockpits had windscreens, and the rear cockpit had a gun ring. The pilot-instructor occupied the front cockpit, and the trainee observer occupied the rear cockpit. A second aircraft was built with a more powerful engine as the MS.251.

== Variants ==
MS.250
Initial design prototype, powered by a 230 hp (170 kW) Salmson 9Ab radial engine; one built.
MS.251
A second aircraft, powered by a 240 hp (180 kW) Lorraine 7Mc radial engine.

== Specifications (MS.250) ==
Data from

General characteristics

- Crew: 2
- Length: 6.96 m (22 ft 10 in)
- Wingspan: 10.7 m (35 ft 1 in)
- Height: 2.82 m (9 ft 3 in)
- Wing area: 19.7 m^{2} (212 sq ft)
- Empty weight: 889 kg (1,960 lb)
- Gross weight: 1,210 kg (2,668 lb)
- Powerplant: 1 × Salmson 9Ab 9-cylinder air-cooled radial piston engine, 170 kW (230 hp)
- Propellers: 2-bladed fixed-pitch propeller

Performance

- Maximum speed: 189 km/h (117 mph, 102 kn)
- Cruise speed: 152 km/h (94 mph, 82 kn)
- Service ceiling: 5,000 m (16,000 ft)
- Rate of climb: 4.067 m/s (800.6 ft/min)

Armament

- Guns: provision for a machine gun in a lobster-back turret in the rear cockpit
