= Nieuport-Delage NiD 540 =

High wing, eight seat, single engine airliner

NiD 540
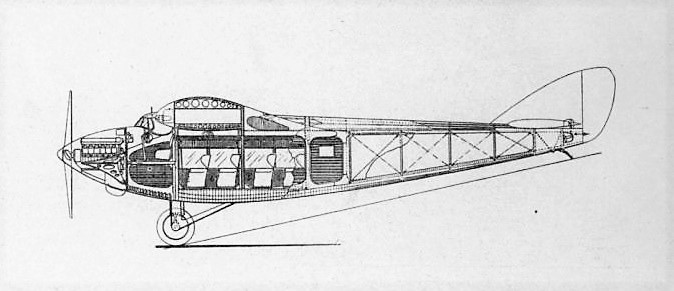

General information
- Type: Eight seat airliner
- National origin: France
- Manufacturer: Nieuport-Delage
- Designer: Charles Pillon and Dieudonné
- Number built: 1 or 2

History
- First flight: beginning of 1930

The Nieuport-Delage NiD 540 was a high wing, eight seat, single engine airliner, built in France and first flown in 1930. It did not reach production.

== Design and development ==
The Nieuport-Delage NiD 540 was an all-metal aircraft. It had a two part, high, cantilever wing; each half-wing was trapezoidal in plan with blunted tips and which tapered uniformly outwards in thickness from below, providing some dihedral. The half-wings were linked by a centre-section built into and the same width as the upper fuselage. High aspect ratio ailerons filled most of the trailing edges. Structurally the half-wings were in three parts, a spanwise box and separate leading and trailing edges, all covered in Duralumin.

The NiD 540's engine was in the nose. Its first flight, made early in 1930 by Lasne, was powered by a 430 kW (580 hp) Renault 12Ki V-12 engine, identifiable by a short, upright exhaust stub, geared down and driving a three blade propeller. By the time of the Paris Salon exhibition in November 1930 it had a 450 kW (600 hp) Lorraine 12Fad Courlis W-12 engine with a two blade propeller and from April 1931 a 450 kW (600 hp) Lorraine Petrel V12.

Behind the engine, the fuselage, rectangular in section apart from a curved roof, was in two parts. The central section, which mounted the wing and held both crew and passengers, was built from riveted frames and was metal skinned, with a corrugated floor. The enclosed and multi-panel glazed cockpit had side-by-side seating with dual control and was just forward of the wing leading edge. The NiD 540's passenger cabin seated eight, each with their own large window, and was entered by a portside door at its rear. The rear section of the fuselage began immediately behind the door and was constructed from four longerons, tapering to the tail and fabric covered.

The NiD 540 had an angular empennage, with its straight-tapered tailplane mounted on top of the fuselage carrying narrow elevators. The square-topped fin had a more generous rudder hinged behind the elevators. Earlier, unbuilt designs of the NiD 540 were shown with curved tail shapes.

The landing gear was fixed and conventional, with each mainwheel, fitted with brakes, on a hinged faired V-strut from the side of the fuselage. A tall, faired landing leg with a Messier shock absorber was attached to the wing root. The track was 4.0 m (13 ft 1 in). Its tailwheel also had a shock absorber.

There were several design studies of variants but the only one which may have been completed was the NiD 541. Rosenthal suggests it was and had a 370 kW (500 hp) Lorraine 14Ae Antarès fourteen cylinder radial engine. Flight, on the other hand, associates this name with the Courlis-engined example on display at the 1930 Salon. Les Ailes makes it clear that the Courlis and the Antares were options in 1930. No images of the radial-engined variant seem to have survived.

Rather little is known of the activities of the NiD 540 after its first flight apart from the various engine changes. A period of official evaluation of these continued until May 1933. It remained active until at least 1935, when it took part in October in the annual tour of French prototypes organised by the French Aeronautical Federation.

== Variants ==
NiD 540
NiD 541
A single example probably built or converted, powered by either a 370 kW (500 hp) Lorraine 14Ae Antarès fourteen cylinder radial engine, or a 450 kW (600 hp) Lorraine 12Fad Courlis W-12 engine.

== Specifications (Lorraine 12F Courlis engine) ==
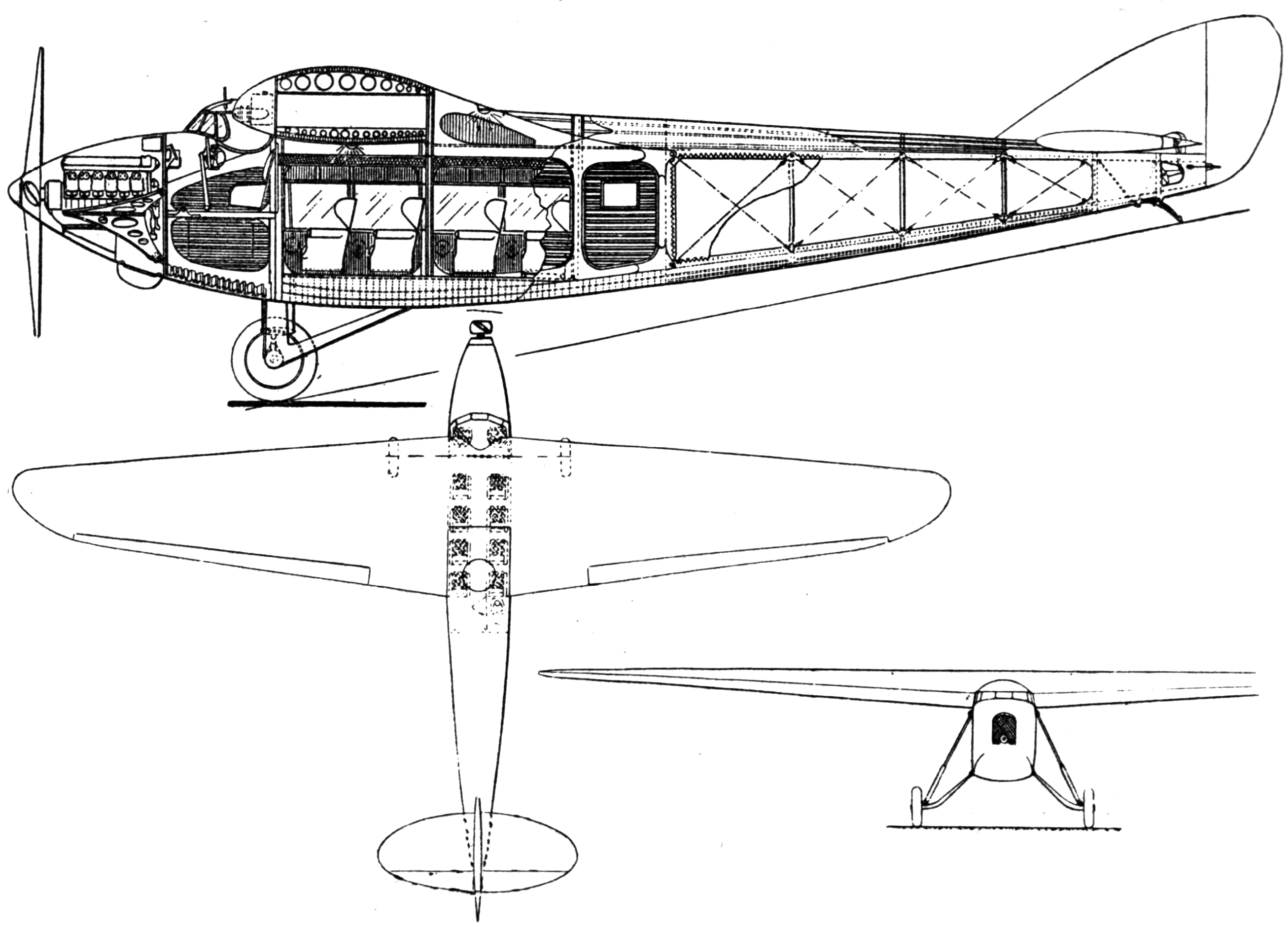
Nieuport-Delage NiD 540 3-view drawing from L'Aérophile October,1928

Data from Les Ailes October 1931 Performance figures calculated.

General characteristics

- Crew: one or two
- Capacity: eight passengers
- Length: 15.0 m (49 ft 3 in)
- Wingspan: 23.40 m (76 ft 9 in)
- Height: 3.80 m (12 ft 6 in)
- Wing area: 60 m^{2} (650 sq ft)
- Empty weight: 2,250 kg (4,960 lb)
- Gross weight: 3,850 kg (8,488 lb) This weight is also quoted for the Lorraine Antares engined variant.
- Powerplant: 1 × Lorraine 12Fad Courlis water-cooled W-12, 490 kW (660 hp) at 2,000 rpm, geared down 1:0.6475
- Propellers: 2-bladed

Performance

- Maximum speed: 214 km/h (133 mph, 116 kn) at ground level
- Cruise speed: 196 km/h (122 mph, 106 kn) at ground level with 80% power
- Range: 800 km (500 mi, 430 nmi)
- Service ceiling: 4,660 m (15,290 ft)
- Time to altitude: 15 min 18 sec to 2,000 m (6,600 ft)
- Take-off speed: 101 km/h (63 mph; 55 kn)

== See also ==
Aircraft of comparable role, configuration, and era

- Focke-Wulf A 17
- Fokker F.XIV
- Kalinin K-5
- Latécoère 28
- Stout 2-AT Pullman
