= Fokker F.XIV =

F.XIV
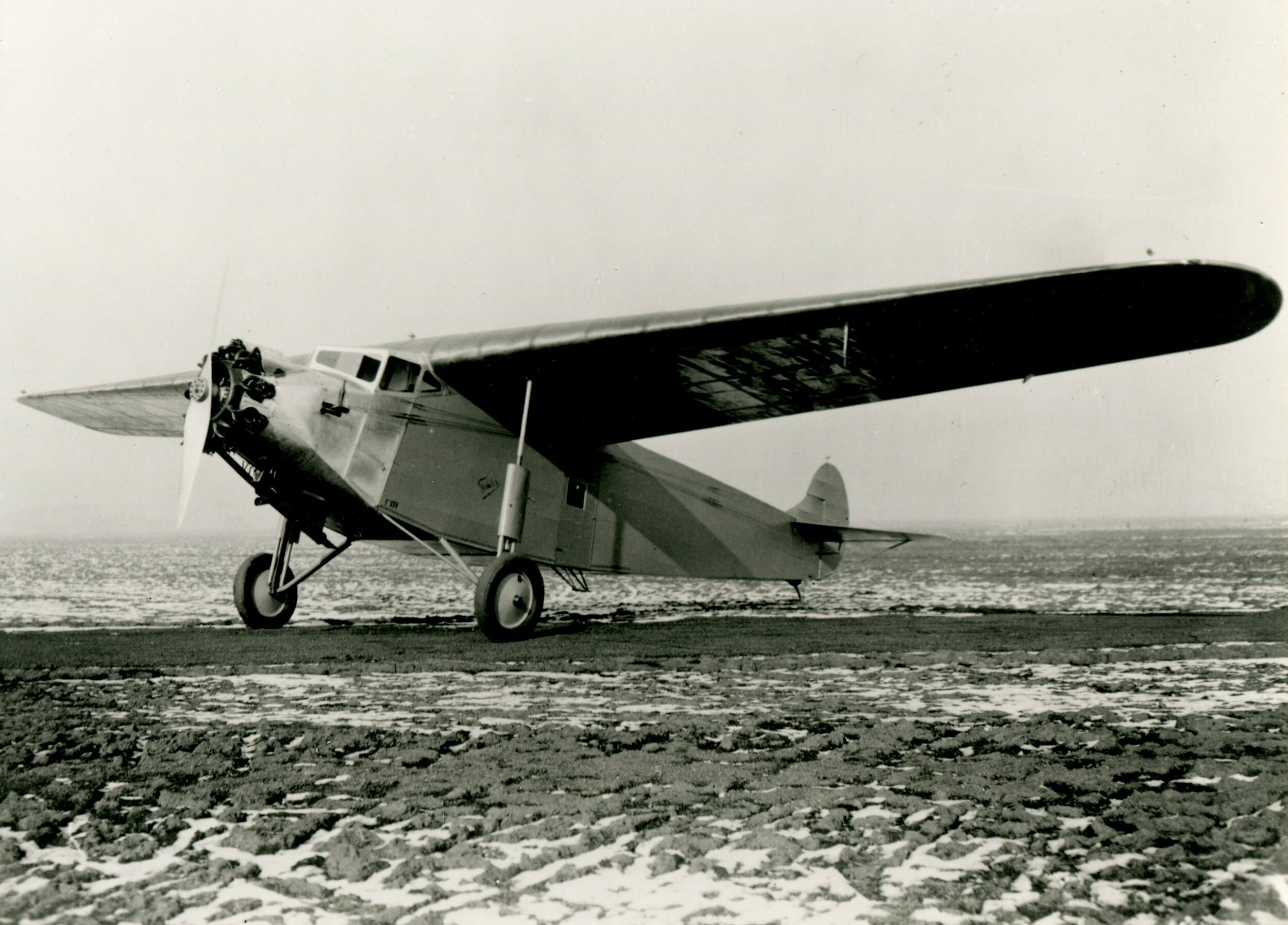
- The only Fokker F.XIV built in a single engine cargo configuration.

General information
- Type: Cargo aircraft/airliner
- National origin: The Netherlands
- Manufacturer: Fokker
- Number built: 1

History
- First flight: 1929

The Fokker F.XIV was a cargo plane built in the Netherlands in the late 1920s by Fokker. It was a high-wing cantilever monoplane of conventional trimotor layout. The sole example was tested by KLM but never put into service.

== Development and design ==
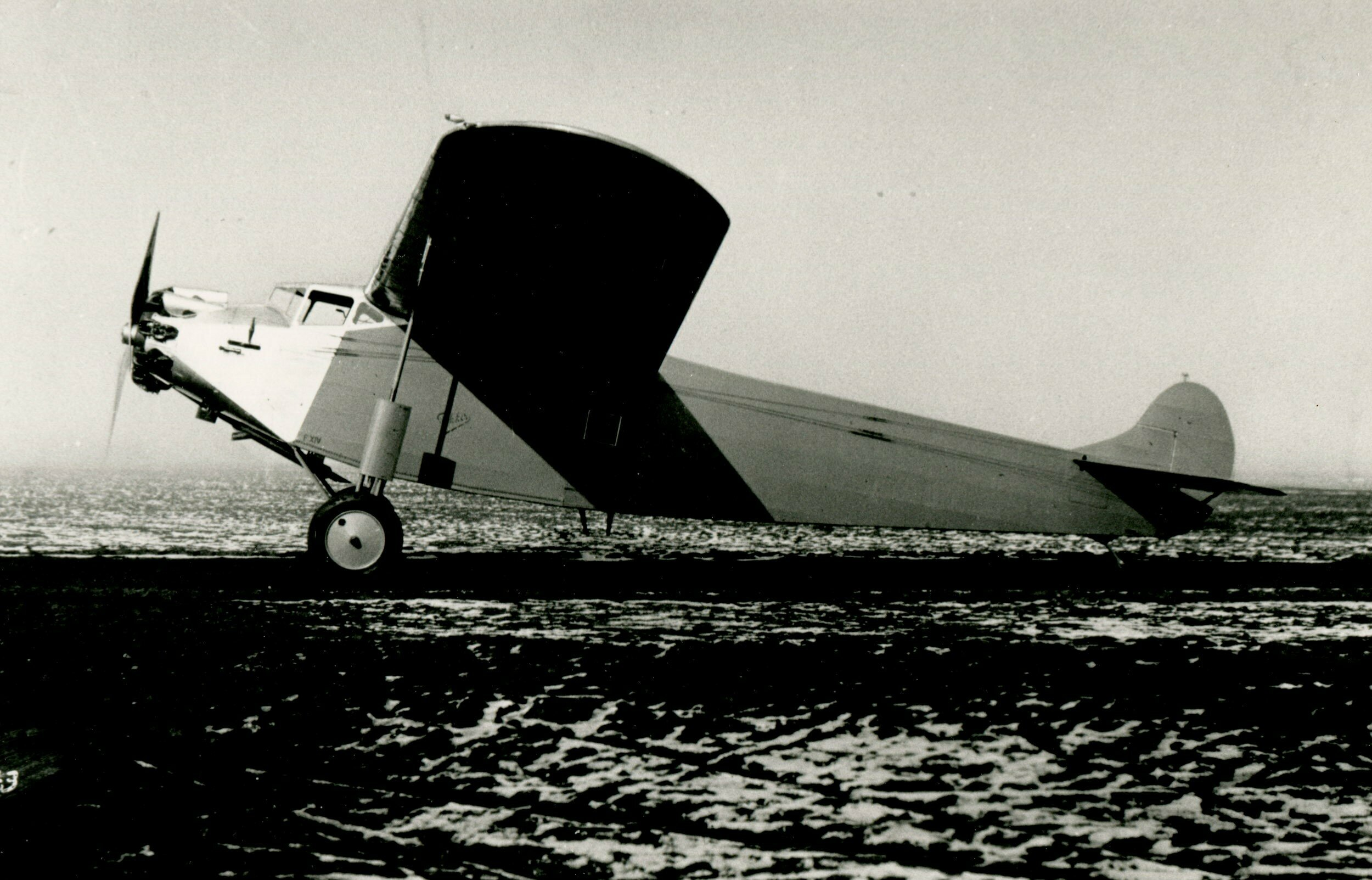

In early 1929, Fokker designed and built a prototype of a single-engine cargo aircraft, probably to meet a requirement from KLM. The F.XIV was a high-wing monoplane powered by a 450 horsepower (340 kW) Gnome-Rhône Jupiter VI radial engine and had a fixed tailwheel undercarriage. Two pilots sat in an enclosed cockpit forward of the wing's leading edge, while the aircraft's cabin could carry 1,240 kilograms (2,730 lb) in a 5 metres (16 ft) long cabin.

There was little interest from airlines in a cargo aircraft, and in 1931 Fokker rebuilt the F.XIV as a three-engined passenger airliner, the F.XIV-3m. The Jupiter was replaced by three 370 horsepower (280 kW) Lorraine Algol radial engines, while the cabin had seats for eight passengers. Although tested by KLM, it was not purchased or operated by them, and ended its days as an exhibit in a pleasure garden.

== Specifications (F.XIV-3m) ==
Data from European Transport Aircraft since 1910

General characteristics

- Crew: 2
- Capacity: 8 passengers
- Length: 15.1 m (49 ft 6 in)
- Wingspan: 20.9 m (68 ft 7 in)
- Wing area: 62 m^{2} (670 sq ft)
- Empty weight: 3,100 kg (6,834 lb)
- Gross weight: 5,500 kg (12,125 lb)
- Powerplant: 3 × Lorraine Algol 9-cylinder air-cooled radial engines, 280 kW (370 hp) each

Performance

- Maximum speed: 234 km/h (145 mph, 126 kn)
- Cruise speed: 197 km/h (122 mph, 106 kn)
- Range: 1,180 km (730 mi, 640 nmi)
- Service ceiling: 3,700 m (12,100 ft)

== See also ==
Aircraft of comparable role, configuration, and era

- Focke-Wulf A 17
- Kalinin K-5
- Latécoère 28
- Messerschmitt M 18
- Nieuport-Delage NiD 540
- Stout 2-AT Pullman
