= Caudron C.251 =

French tandem seat, open cockpit biplane

Caudron 251

General information
- Type: Trainer aircraft
- National origin: France
- Manufacturer: Caudron
- Number built: 1

History
- First flight: First half of 1931

The Caudron C.251 Et-2 was a French tandem seat, open cockpit biplane designed as an intermediate trainer and built in 1931. It did not go into production.

== Design and development ==
The two seat, open cockpit C.251 was designed to replace the ubiquitous Caudron C.59, dating from 1922, as an intermediate trainer aircraft. It was a single bay biplane with N-form interplane struts, its upper wing supported over the fuselage on a pair of short, vertical, N-form cabane struts. The slightly shorter span lower wing was mounted on the lower fuselage longerons a little above the fuselage underside and, unlike the upper wing had some dihedral. The wings had significant stagger but were of similar plan, with equal and constant chord except near the straight but angled wing tip. Only the lower wings carried ailerons.

It was powered by a 180 kW (240 hp) Lorraine 7Me Mizar seven cylinder radial engine which had a Townend ring type cowling and drove a two blade metal propeller with a conical spinner. Behind the engine the fuselage was fabric covered and flat sided, though with a polygonal underside and decking. The forward cockpit was under the upper wing trailing edge where a slight cut-out improved the pupil's upward view. The instructor's cockpit was further back. The C.251s empennage was conventional, with tailplane and elevators mounted on top of the fuselage and having a planform similar to the wins, apart from a cut-out for rudder movement. The fin profile was a shallow triangle; the rudder continued its upper line to a rounded tip and straight, vertical trailing edge.

The C.251 had a fixed tail wheel undercarriage and the rudder was slightly cut away below to give the tail wheel leg room for movement. The main wheels were mounted on half-axles attached on the central fuselage underside and hinged on faired V-struts from the lower fuselage longerons. Landing loads were absorbed by legs also mounted on the lower longerons.

The C.251 flew for the first time in the first half of 1931. That October it went to the military testing department at Villacoublay and was still there in January 1932. No production order followed and by February the sole C.251 was at Saint-Cyr, on its way to the Istres aviation school.

== Specifications ==
Data from Hauet (2001) p.236

General characteristics

- Crew: Two
- Length: 8.07 m (26 ft 6 in)
- Upper wingspan: 10.24 m (33 ft 7 in)
- Height: 3.27 m (10 ft 9 in)
- Wing area: 27.83 m^{2} (299.6 sq ft) upper area 14.72 m^{2} (158.4 sq ft), lower 13.11 m^{2} (141.1 sq ft)
- Aspect ratio: upper wing 7.1
- Empty weight: 798 kg (1,759 lb)
- Gross weight: 1,210 kg (2,668 lb)
- Fuel capacity: 290 L (64 imp gal; 77 US gal)
- Powerplant: 1 × Lorraine 7Me Mizar air-cooled, 7 cylinder radial, 180 kW (240 hp) 240 ch
- Propellers: 2-bladed Chauvière, 2.70 m (8 ft 10 in) diameter metal

Performance

- Maximum speed: 220 km/h (140 mph, 120 kn) at sea level
- Stall speed: 78 km/h (48 mph, 42 kn)
- Service ceiling: 6,000 m (20,000 ft)
- Take-off distance: 80 m (262 ft)
- Landing distance: 100 m (328 ft)
