= Latécoère 17 =

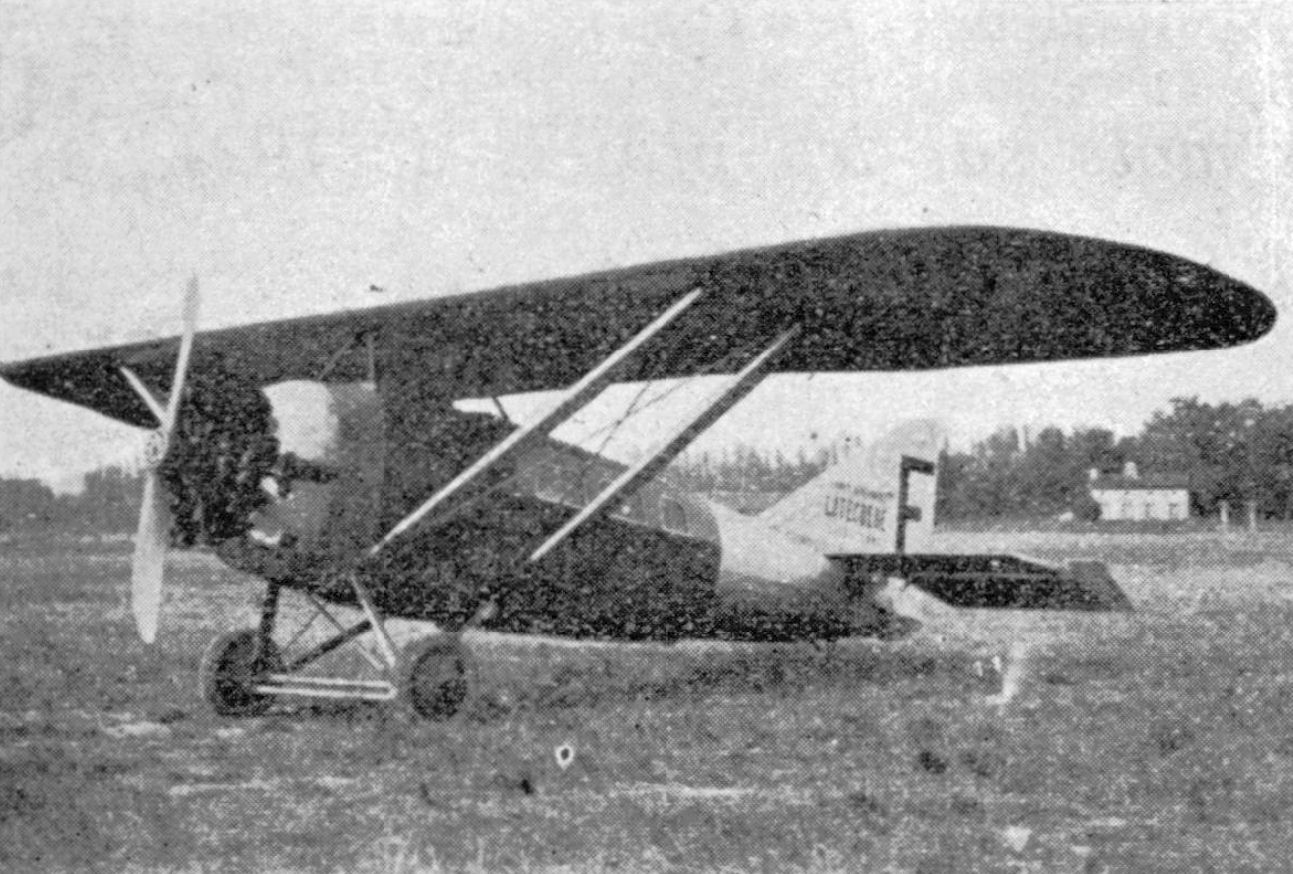
- 17-3J

General information
- Type: Airliner
- National origin: France
- Manufacturer: Latécoère
- Primary user: Lignes Aériennes Latécoère
- Number built: 22

History
- First flight: 1924
- Developed into: Latécoère 25

The Latécoère 17 was a French airliner built in 1923 for use on Latécoère's own airline routes between France and Morocco. The prototype was designated the Latécoère 14, reusing the number of an unrelated earlier design that had been rejected. This new aircraft was a parasol wing monoplane of conventional configuration with an enclosed cabin for four passengers and an open cockpit for the pilot. This was Latécoère's first commercially successful design and as production continued, three different engines were fitted.

== Design and development ==
The Latécoère 14's parasol wing was rectangular in plan and built around a pair of metal girder spars and with wooden ribs. It was fabric covered except in the centre which was covered with sheet metal and contained the fuel tank and a post box. The trailing edge had a large cut-out over the pilot's open cockpit to increase the upward field of view. On each side the wing was braced by a pair parallel of struts from the spars to the base of the fuselage, assisted about halfway out by a lighter, vertical strut pair and a third pair to the upper fuselage. Its centre section was attached to the fuselage by a fore and aft pair of inverted V-cabane struts.

It was fitted with a 220 kW (300 hp) Renault 12Fe water-cooled V12 engine with a vertical exhaust and a transverse radiator under the nose. The fuselage had a curved-section, with a metal structure and either plywood or metal covering (there are conflicting reports) forwards from the rear of the cabin and wooden structure with fabric covering aft. The cabin started aft of the cockpit, had three windows on each side and accommodated four passengers who entered by an oval port-side door.

The empennage was conventional with metal structures and fabric covering. Its cantilever tailplane, mounted high on the fuselage, was rectangular in plan as were the elevators. The fin and balanced rudder had a triangular profile, with a vertical trailing edge.

The Latécoère 14 had conventional, fixed landing gear with mainwheels on a streamlined single axle, fitted with rubber cord shock absorbers. Its ends were mounted to the lower fuselage with a V-strut on either side, cross braced with steel wires.

Probably two type 14s were built. It was first flown, by Enderlin, in 1924. In December 1924 the second prototype appeared at the Paris Salon, already re-identified as the Latécoère 17. Tests had shown that it could only carry a disappointing commercial load of 450 kg (990 lb). The 17-1R (R for Renault engine) was a structural redesign and rebuild of the first type 14 that increased the load by 120 kg (260 lb). There was a new wing with semi-elliptical tips which reduced wing area by 3 m^{2} (32 sq ft); The deep cut-out was filled in, recovering some wing area. Seven were built, including two prototypes.

During the production run, the fuselage covering was replaced with a longitudinally corrugated dural skin from the behind engine to the rear of the cabin. The earlier single port-side door was replaced by two on the starboard side and there were also two long, top-hinged doors on that side, one above the other, accessing freight and baggage space under the cockpit. These examples were designated 17-3R, of which seven were new-built and two more modified from 17-1Rs.

There were also variants powered by 280 kW (380 hp) Gnome-Rhône 9A engines, a nine-cylinder radial, housed under an ovoid cowling with its cylinder heads projecting for cooling. One 17-1J, equivalent to the 17-1R, was built and was later modified to 17-3J standard, together with five new examples.

== Operational history ==
Lignes Aériennes Latécoère, operating as Compagnie générale d'entreprises aéronautiques (CGEA) flew at least fifteen of these aircraft and used several of them on its routes between France and Morocco. Eight were used for services to South America and two on a temporary domestic route between Perpignan, Marseille, and Toulouse. After the sale of CGEA in 1928 they were operated by Aeropostale.

== Variants ==
Data from Cuny (1992), p. 62

Latécoère 14
Prototype with 220 kW (300 hp) Renault 12Fe engine. Two built.
Latécoère 17-1R

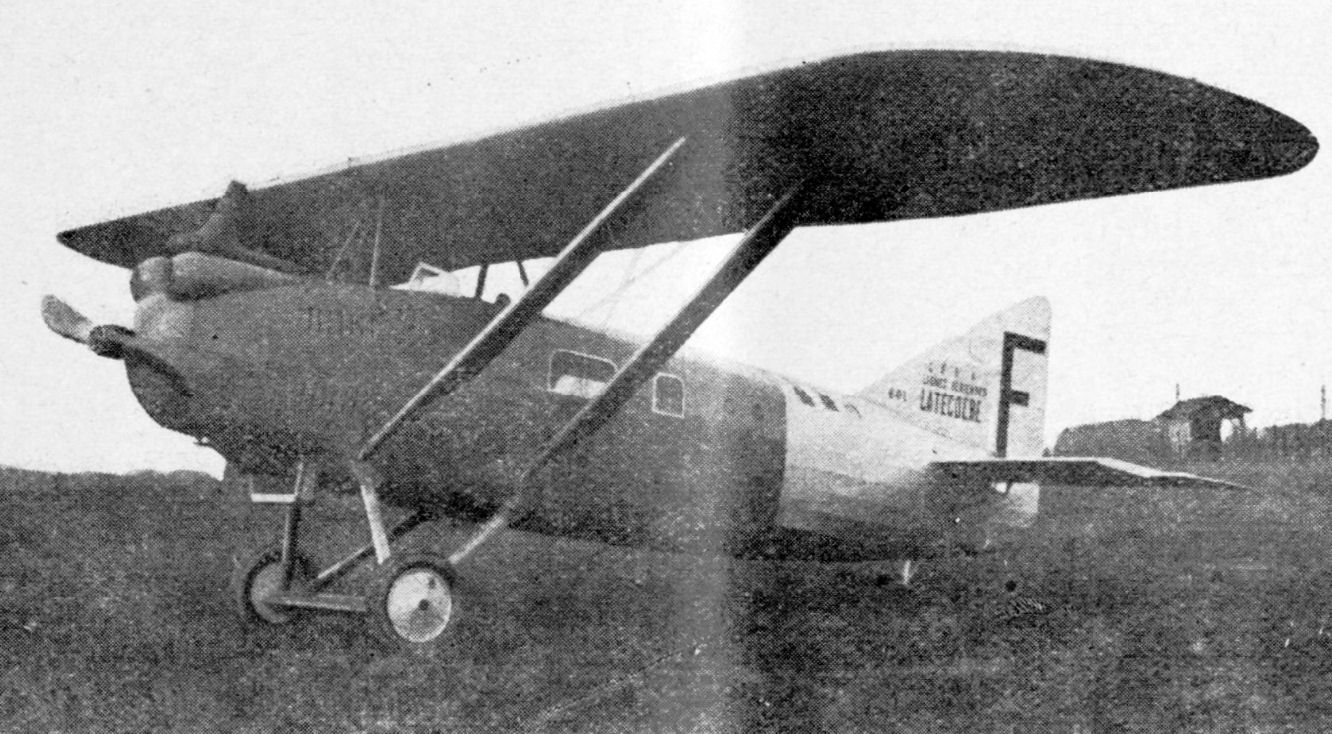
Latécoère 17 with Renault motor. Photo from L'Air January 15, 1928

Initial production version with Renault 12Fe engine. Seven built including two prototypes, one the converted first 14.
Latécoère 17-3R
Production version with Renault 12Fe engine. Seven built, plus two converted from 17-1R.
Latécoère 17-4R
Production version with 340 kW (450 hp) Renault 12Ja engine. Two built, plus one converted from 17-3R.
Latécoère 17-1J
Version of 17-1R with 280 kW (380 hp) Gnome et Rhône 9A Jupiter engine. One built.
Latécoère 17-3J
Production version of 17-1J. Five built, plus one converted from 17-1J.

== Specifications (17-4R) ==
Data from Cuny, (1992), p.63

General characteristics

- Crew: One
- Capacity: Four passengers
- Length: 9.58 m (31 ft 5 in)
- Wingspan: 14.00 m (45 ft 11 in)
- Height: 3.58 m (11 ft 9 in)
- Wing area: 34.6 m^{2} (372 sq ft)
- Empty weight: 1,495 kg (3,296 lb)
- Gross weight: 2,695 kg (5,941 lb)
- Powerplant: 1 × Renault 12Ja water-cooled V12, 340 kW (450 hp)
- Propellers: 2-bladed

Performance

- Cruise speed: 185 km/h (115 mph, 100 kn)
- Range: 570 km (350 mi, 310 nmi)
