= Potez 25 =

1920s French reconnaissance aircraft family

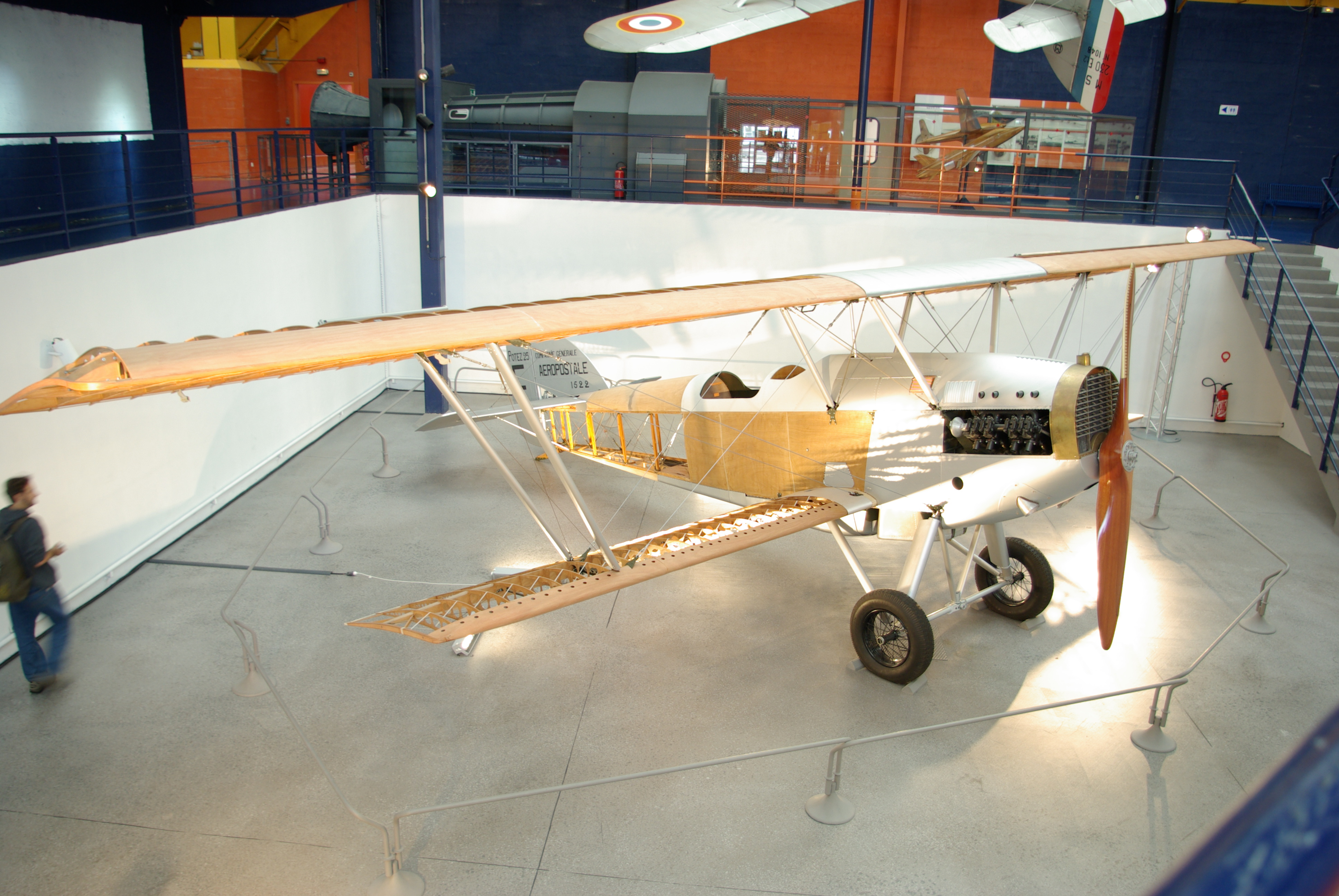

General information
- Type: Reconnaissance; Bomber; Fighter
- Manufacturer: Potez; Podlaska Wytwórnia Samolotów (PWS)
- Primary users: French Air Force Polish Air Force
- Number built: 4,000 (2,500 in France)

History
- Introduction date: 1925
- First flight: 1924
- Retired: 1940s
- Developed from: Potez 23
- Variants: Potez 26; Potez 27

The Potez 25 (also written as Potez XXV) was a French twin-seat, single-engine sesquiplane designed during the 1920s. A light multi-purpose fighter-bomber, it was designed as a line aircraft and used as a fighter and escort fighter, tactical bombing and reconnaissance missions. In the late 1920s and early 1930s, the Potez 25 was the standard multi-purpose aircraft of over 20 air forces, including French and Polish. It was also popular among private operators, notably mail transport companies. The aircraft was further developed into the 25M, a standard parasol-wing monoplane, which never entered production.

== Design and development ==
In 1923, the Avions Henry Potez aircraft works started production of the Potez 15 reconnaissance biplane. Basing on experience gathered during the construction of that aircraft, Henry Potez started work on a new design of a heavier and faster multi-purpose aircraft. Called the Potez XXV or Potez 25, the prototype was built in 1924. The main differences included a larger, more powerful engine and a new wing design. Instead of a classic biplane, Potez introduced a sesquiplane, with the lower wing significantly smaller. It was built in two main military variants, the Potez 25A2 reconnaissance aircraft and the Potez 25B2 bomber-reconnaissance aircraft.

In May 1925, the prototype was tested at the Service Technique d'Aeronautique Institute and was found promising for its manoeuvrability, speed and durability. Following the tests, the prototype entered serial production. To promote the new aircraft abroad, in a post-war market filled with hundreds of cheap demobilized aircraft, the Potez 25 was entered into a large number of races. Among the best-known achievements was a European rally (7,400 km (4,600 mi)) and a Mediterranean rally (6,500 km (4,000 mi)) won by pilots flying the Potez. In 1920s, the Potez 25 was also used in a well-advertised Paris−Tehran rally (13,080 km (8,130 mi)). In June 1930, Henri Guillaumet crashed with his Potez 25 in the Andes during an air mail flight. He survived after trekking through the mountains and was found after one week of searching.

Such achievements added to aircraft's popularity and made it one of the most successful French aircraft of the epoch. It was bought by a number of air forces, including those of France, Switzerland, Belgium, Brazil, Croatia, Estonia, Ethiopia, Finland, Greece, Spain, Japan, Yugoslavia, Paraguay, Poland, Portugal, Romania, Turkey and the USSR. After the USSR acquired two aircraft for testing, they decided against further purchases, finding it comparable to the native Polikarpov R-5. Altogether, approximately 2,500 aircraft were built in France.

In 1925, Poland bought a licence for Potez 25 and started to manufacture them in Podlaska Wytwórnia Samolotów (PWS, 150 built) and Plage i Laśkiewicz aircraft works (150 built). In 1928 the first Polish-built Potez 25 were tested by the Technical Aviation Development Institute in Warsaw and the design was slightly modified to better fit the needs of the Polish air forces. Among the notable differences were the introduction of leading edge slots. The production in Poland ceased in 1932. Altogether, 300 aircraft were built in a number of versions for long- and short-range reconnaissance and daylight tactical bombing. As the original Lorraine-Dietrich 12Eb engine was unavailable in Poland, it was replaced in 47 aircraft with a more powerful PZL Bristol Jupiter VIIF radial engine, starting from 1936.

In Romania, Potez 25 was produced by Industria Aeronautică Română (IAR). Several other countries manufactured Potez 25s under licence.

== Variants ==
Potez 25
One prototype aircraft, powered by a 336 kW (451 hp) Hispano-Suiza 12Ga W-12 engine.

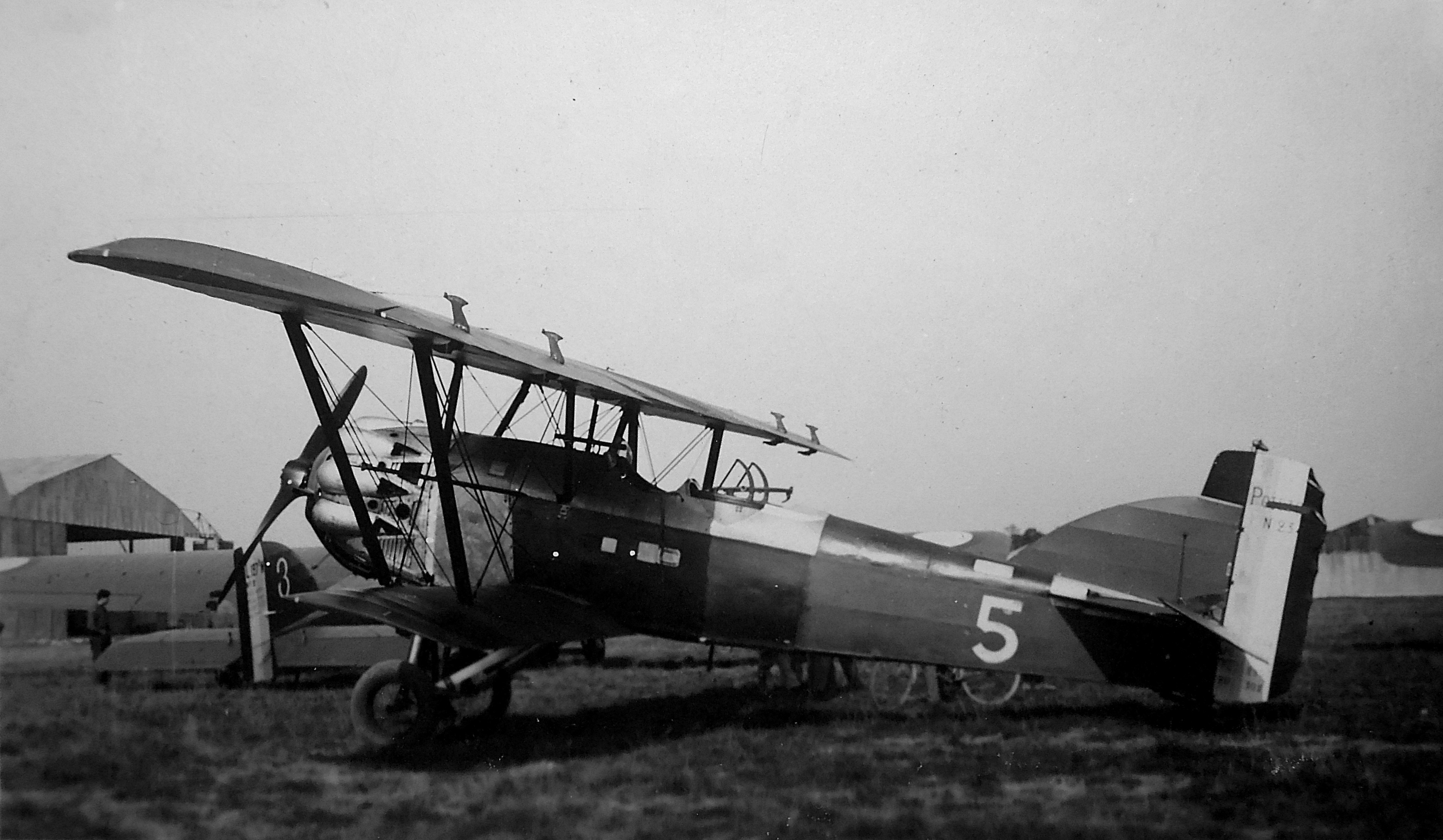
Potez 25 A.2 with Salmson engine

Potez 25 A.2
Two-seat observation version, powered by a 388 kW (520 hp) Salmson 18Cmb or Lorraine 12Eb engine.
Potez 25.5
Production version, powered by a 373 kW (500 hp) Renault 12Jb, 100 built.
Potez 25.8
A reconnaissance-bomber powered by a 370 kW (500 hp) Farman 12Wc W-12 engine, several dozen of which were built.
Potez 25.12
Reconnaissance aircraft, approximately 280 built, powered by 390 kW (520 hp) Salmson 18Cmb 18 cyl. 9-bank in-line radial engines, (9 pairs of cylinders one behind the other, not staggered).
Potez 25.23
A P-25.12, (n°71), modified for a tour of Europe from 14 to 22 September 1928.
Potez 25.35
Two-seat target-tug version.
Potez 25.36
Two-seat monoplane version
Potez 25.44
A reconnaissance-bomber powered by a 370 kW (500 hp) Renault 12Jb V-12 engine, 74 of which were built.
Potez 25.47
A single liaison two-seater built especially for the Ministère de l'Air powered by a 450 kW (600 hp) Hispano-Suiza 12Lb V-12 engine.
Potez 25.55
Two-seat training version. 40 built.
Potez 25 ET.2
Two-seat intermediate training version, powered by a 373 kW (500 hp) Salmson 18Ab radial engine.
Potez 25 Farman
Two-seat observation version for the French Air Force, powered by a 373 kW (500 hp) Farman 12We. Also known as the Potez 25/4. 12 built.
Potez 25GR
Long-range version, powered by 340 kW (450 hp) Lorraine 12Eb W-12 engines.
Potez 25 'Jupiter'
Export version, powered by a 313 kW (420 hp) Gnome-Rhône 9Ac Jupiter radial. Built under licence by Ikarbus in Yugoslavia and OGMA in Portugal, exported to Estonia and Switzerland.
Potez 25H
Two floatplane prototypes, each one was powered by Gnome-Rhône 9A Jupiter radials.
Potez 25 Hispano-Suiza
VIP transport version, powered by a 447 kW (599 hp) Hispano-Suiza 12Lb.
Potez 25M
one Hispano-Suiza powered aircraft was converted into a parasol-wing monoplane.

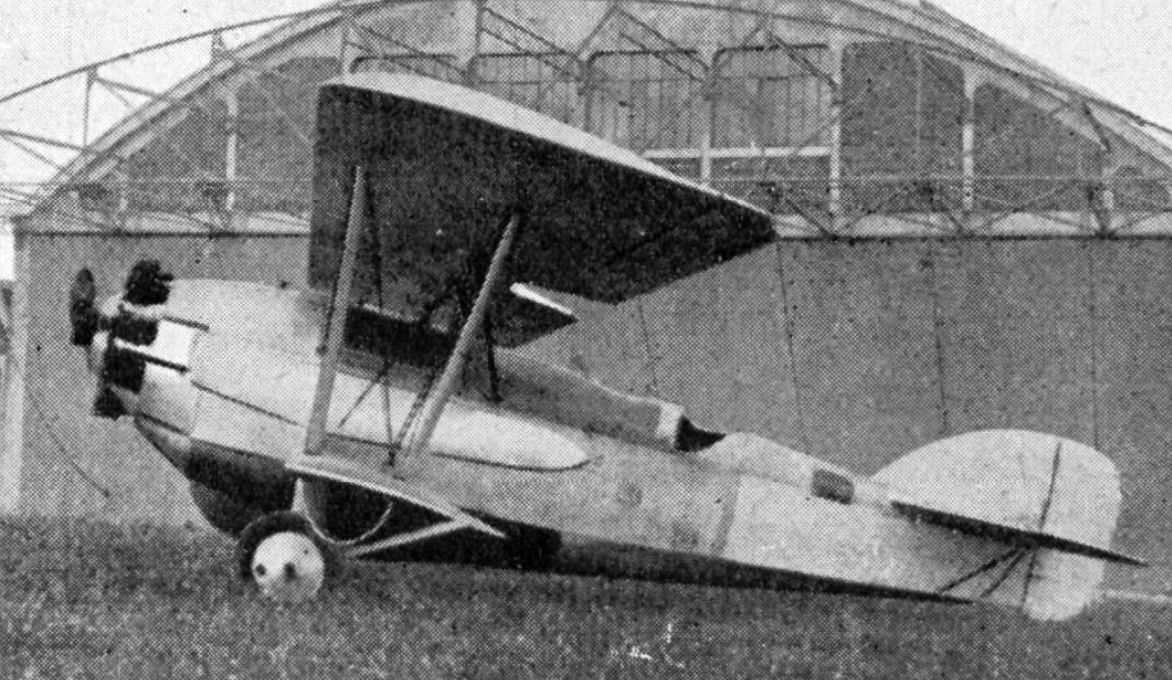
Potez 25 O photo from L'Aéronautique January,1926

Potez 25-O
Specially strengthened and modified version, built for a non-stop North Atlantic crossing. The aircraft was powered by a Jupiter radial, fitted with jettisonable landing gear and a strengthened landing skid. Only two were built.
Potez 25TOE
Major production version, 795 built, powered by 340 kW (450 hp) Lorraine 12Eb W-12 engines.

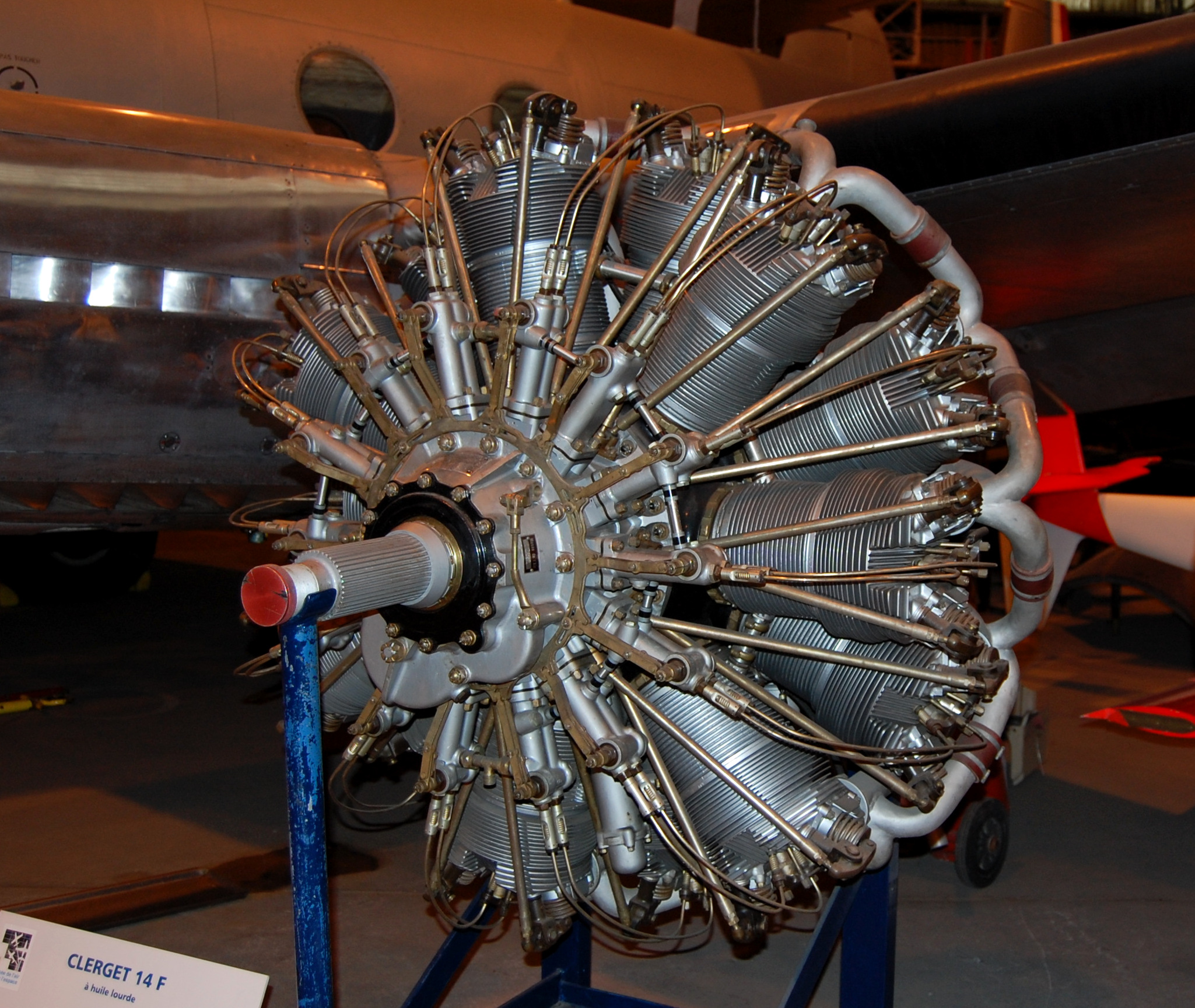
A Clerget 14F diesel aircraft engine preserved at the Conservatoire de l'Air et de l'Espace d'Aquitaine

Potez 25 engine test bed
A Potez 25 was used to test a Clerget 14F-01 14-cylinder, two-row radial diesel engine. This aircraft, complete with diesel engine was probably the aircraft exported to Japan which became the Potez CXP1 of the Imperial Japanese Navy Air Service (IJNAS).

== Operators ==
Afghanistan

- Afghan Air Force

Belgium

- Belgian Air Force

Brazil

- Brazilian Air Force

China

- Chinese Nationalist Air Force
- Fengtian (Manchuria)
- Sichuan clique

Independent State of Croatia

- Zrakoplovstvo Nezavisne Države Hrvatske captured 42 from the Royal Yugoslav Air Force.

Ethiopia

- Ethiopian Air Force acquired 3 aircraft.

Estonia

- Estonian Air Force operated Potez 25 Jupiter up to 1940.

Finland

- Finnish Air Force purchased one Potez 25 A.2 in 1927 and evaluated until 1936.

France

- French Air Force
- French Naval Aviation

Vichy France

- Vichy French Air Force

Free France

- Free French Air Force

Greece

- Hellenic Air Force

Guatemala

- Guatemalan Air Force

Japan

- Imperial Japanese Army Air Service
- Imperial Japanese Navy Air Service – Purchased as Potez CXP.

Paraguay

- Paraguayan Air Force operated a total of 14 aircraft, six Potez 25 A.2 and eight Potez 25 TOE during the Chaco War against Bolivia.

Poland

- Polish Air Force operated 16 aircraft bought in France and another 300 aircraft manufactured in Poland.

Portugal

- Portuguese Air Force

Romania

- Royal Romanian Air Force

Spanish Republic

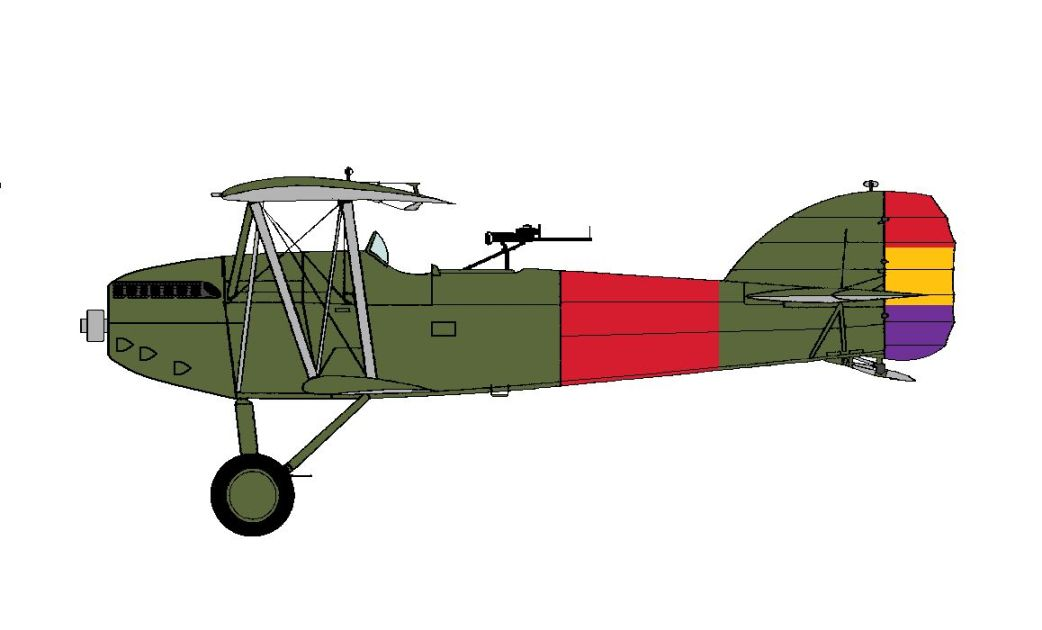
Potez 25 of the Spanish Republican Air Force

- Spanish Republican Air Force

Switzerland

- Swiss Air Force

Soviet Union

- Soviet Air Force – Two aircraft used for tests and trials.

Turkey

- Turkish Air Force

Uruguay

- Uruguayan Air Force

Kingdom of Yugoslavia

- Yugoslav Royal Air Force operated 200 aircraft manufactured in Yugoslavia.

=== Civil operators ===
France

- Aéropostale
- Caudron Flying School
- Compagnie Francaise d'Aviation
- Hanriot Airline and Hanriot Flying School

== Specifications (Potez 25) ==
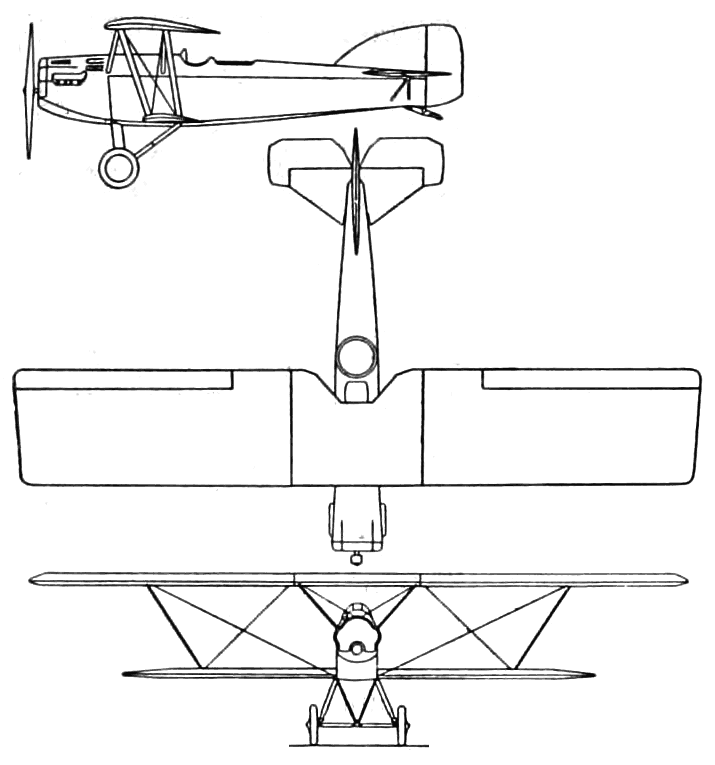
Potez 25 A.2 3-view drawing from Aero Digest September,1930

Data from Aviafrance : Potez 25

General characteristics

- Crew: 2
- Length: 9.14 m (30 ft 0 in)
- Wingspan: 14.14 m (46 ft 5 in)
- Height: 3.67 m (12 ft 0 in)
- Wing area: 46.46 m^{2} (500.1 sq ft)
- Empty weight: 1,370 kg (3,020 lb)
- Gross weight: 2,494 kg (5,498 lb)
- Powerplant: 1 × Gnome & Rhône 9Ac 9-cylinder air-cooled radial piston engine, 240 kW (320 hp)
- Propellers: 2-bladed fixed-pitch propeller

Performance

- Maximum speed: 230 km/h (140 mph, 120 kn)

Armament

- Guns: 2 × 7.7 mm (0.303 in) Vickers machine gun, with 1 × 7.7 mm (0.303 in) Lewis guns flexibly mounted in the rear cockpit
- Bombs: 200 kg (440 lb) of bombs

== See also ==
- Aerial operations in the Chaco War

Related lists

- List of interwar military aircraft
- List of aircraft of the Spanish Republican Air Force
- List of aircraft of World War II
- List of military aircraft of Finland
- List of military aircraft of France
