= Potez XV =

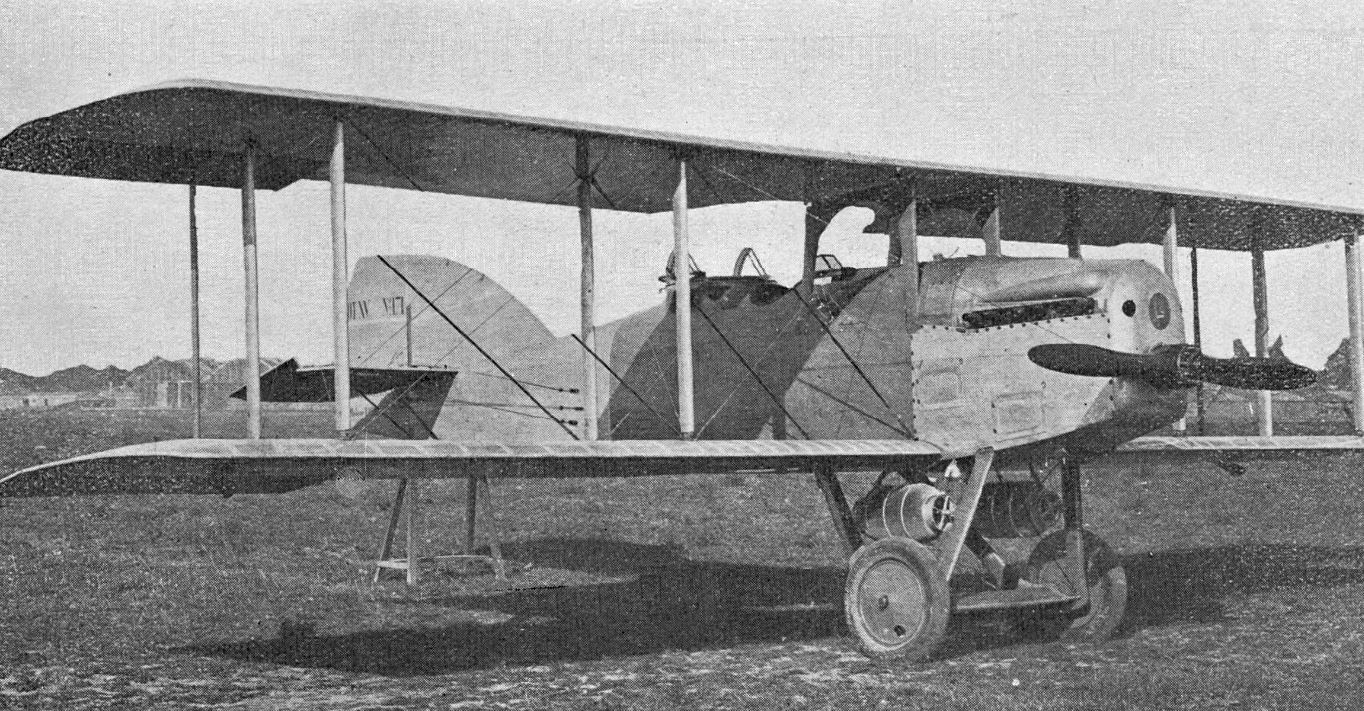

General information
- Type: Reconnaissance bomber
- Manufacturer: Potez; PWS; Plage i Laśkiewicz
- Primary users: French Air Force Polish Air Force
- Number built: 687

History
- Manufactured: 1923–1926
- Introduction date: 1923
- First flight: October 1921
- Variants: Potez 23; Potez 27

The Potez XV (also erroneously written Potez 15) was a French single-engine, two-seat observation biplane designed as a private venture by Louis Coroller and built by Potez and under licence by Podlaska Wytwórnia Samolotów and Plage i Laśkiewicz in Poland.

== Design and development ==
The aircraft was designed in the beginning of the 1920s by Henry Coroller in Potez works. It was a development of a fighter SEA IV built by Société d'Etudes Aéronautiques, a former firm of Henry Potez and Coroller. A prototype was flown in October 1921 and shown at Paris Air Show that year. It was conventional biplane with a fixed tailskid landing gear and a nose-mounted 276 kW (370 hp) Lorraine 12D engine. The engine was later replaced by a 224 kW (300 hp) Renault 12Fe.

After a successful evaluation, the aircraft was ordered by the Aéronautique Militiare as a reconnaissance aircraft. The first aircraft were manufactured and delivered in late 1923.

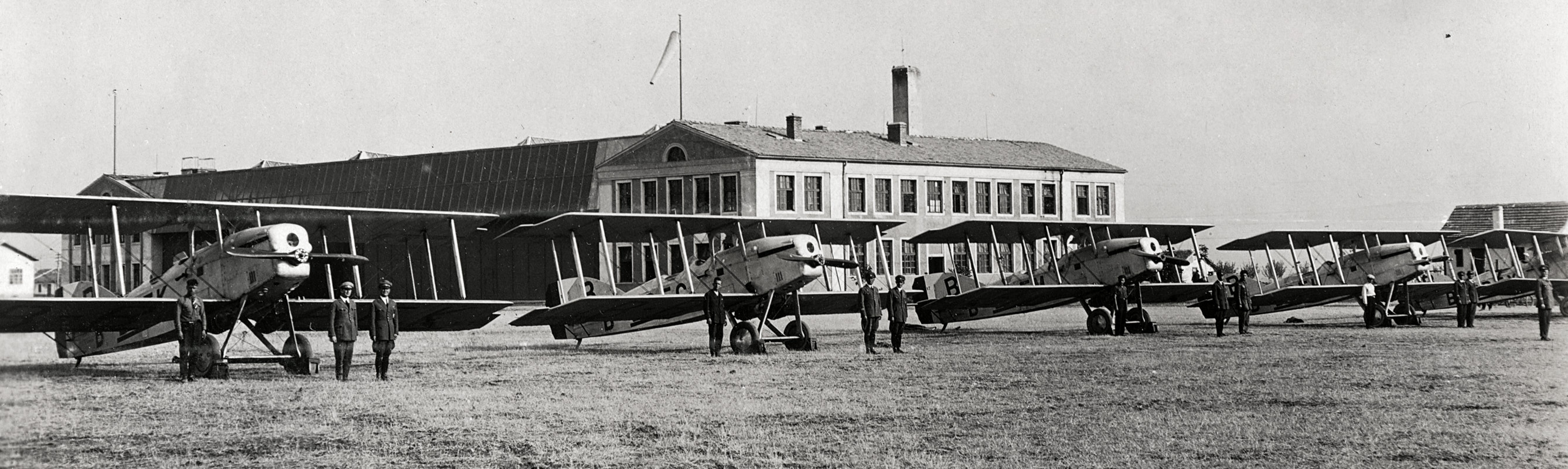
Potez XVIIs in Bulgaria, 1928

Series-built aircraft were powered with Lorraine-Dietrich 12Db V-12 engines. 410 were built in France. The aircraft was built in two main military variants: Potez XV A.2 reconnaissance aircraft and Potez XV B.2 bomber-reconnaissance aircraft. A single prototype of a floatplane variant Potez XV HO.2 was built. There was also an export variant Potez XVII of 1923, built for Bulgaria only, with the same LD 12Db engine.

Already in 1923, Poland bought a licence for the Potez 15 and started to manufacture them in Podlaska Wytwórnia Samolotów (PWS, 35 built in 1925) and Plage i Laśkiewicz aircraft works (100 built in 1925–1926).

A development of Potez XV was Potez 27,

== Operational history ==
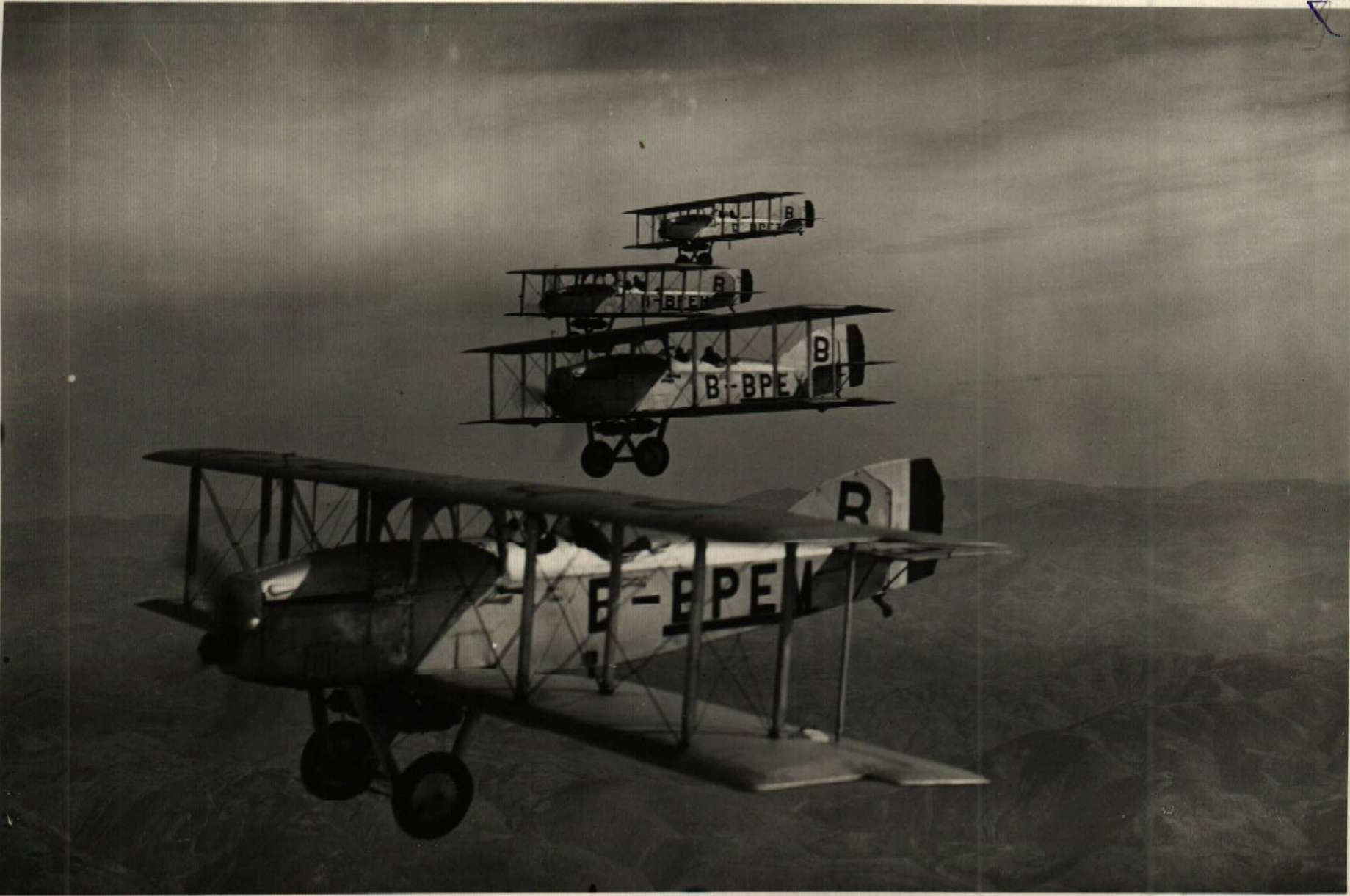
Potez 15s in flight over Bulgaria, c. 1930.

Primary user of Potez 15s was the French Air Force, from late 1923. Main user became the Polish Air Force with 110 aircraft bought and 135 manufactured in Poland.

In the Polish Air Force, they were used from late 1924. Their withdrawal from combat units started in 1927, then they were used for training until mid-1930s.

120 aircraft were sold to Romania, 12 to Spain, and eight to Denmark. Six Potez XVIIs were sold to Bulgaria. 25 Potez XV A.2 were used in Yugoslavia. These shared the engine, fuselage, undercarriage and tailfin of the Potez XV, combining them with the wings and stabilizers from a newer design, the 25.

== Description ==
Wooden construction biplane with fixed landing gear. The fuselage was framed, with metal covering for front engine section, plywood covering for the midsection and canvas covering for the tail section. Rectangular two-spar wings, plywood (leading edge) and canvas covered, of equal span. Crew of two, sitting in tandem in open cockpits: pilot in front, observer in the rear. Conventional fixed landing gear, with a common straight axle and a rear skid. Engine in front, two barrel-type water Lamblin radiators below the fuselage, between the landing gear. Two-blade wooden propeller. Fuel tanks in the fuselage. The pilot had one fixed 7.7 mm (.303 in) Vickers machine gun with an interrupter gear, the observer had twin 7.7 mm (.303 in) Lewis Guns on a ring mounting.

== Variants ==
Potez XV
Production variant powered by a 400 hp (300 kW) Lorraine-Dietrich 12Db V-12 engine.
Potez XV HO.2
A 2-seat observation floatplane variant powered by a 400 hp (300 kW) Lorraine-Dietrich 12Db V-12 engine.
Potez XVII
Modified variant for Bulgaria, six built.

== Operators ==
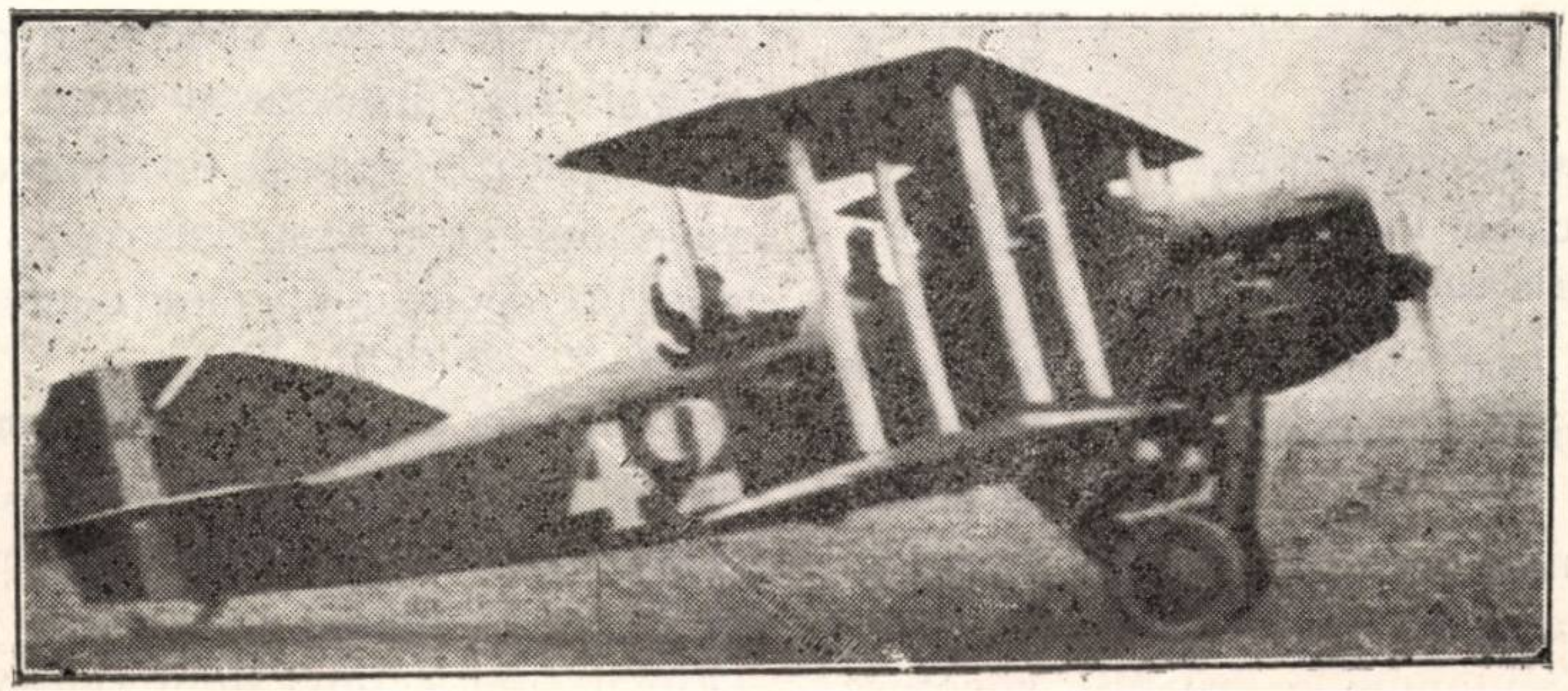
Romanian Potez XV, 1927

Bulgaria

- Bulgarian Air Force

Denmark

- Royal Danish Air Force

France

- French Air Force
- French Navy

Poland

- Polish Air Force

Romania

- Royal Romanian Air Force

Spain
Kingdom of Yugoslavia

- Royal Yugoslav Air Force

== Specifications ==
Data from Polskie konstrukcje lotnicze 1893–1939

General characteristics

- Crew: 2
- Length: 8.7 m (28 ft 7 in)
- Wingspan: 12.68 m (41 ft 7 in)
- Height: 3.2 m (10 ft 6 in)
- Wing area: 46 m^{2} (500 sq ft)
- Empty weight: 1,487 kg (3,278 lb)
- Gross weight: 1,950 kg (4,299 lb)
- Powerplant: 1 × Lorraine-Dietrich 12Db W-12 water-cooled piston engine, 309 kW (414 hp)
- Propellers: 2-bladed fixed-pitch propeller

Performance

- Maximum speed: 202 km/h (126 mph, 109 kn)
- Range: 510 km (320 mi, 280 nmi)
- Service ceiling: 4,200 m (13,800 ft)
- Rate of climb: 3.9 m/s (770 ft/min)-->

Armament

- Guns: 1 × 7.7 mm (.303 in) fixed, forward-firing Vickers machine gun, 2 × 7.7 mm (.303 in) Lewis guns, on a ring mounting
- Bombs: 125 kg (276 lb) of bombs

== See also ==
Related development

- SEA IV
- Potez 25

Related lists

- List of military aircraft of France
- List of Interwar military aircraft

== Bibliography ==
- Anderson, Lennart (November–December 2019). "La renaissance de l'aviation militair bulgare dans les années vingt" [The Rebirth of Bulgarian Military Aviation in the Twenties]. Avions (in French) (232): 52–66. ISSN 1243-8650.
- Cortet, Pierre & Coroller, Jean-Louis (November 1995). "Le Potez XV et ses dérivés (1^{e} partie)" [The Potez XV and its Derivatives]. Avions: Toute l'aéronautique et son histoire (in French) (32): 38–41. ISSN 1243-8650.
- Cortet, Pierre & Coroller, Jean-Louis (December 1995). "Le Potez XV et ses dérivés (2^{e} partie)". Avions: Toute l'aéronautique et son histoire (in French) (33): 14–19. ISSN 1243-8650.
- Cortet, Pierre & Coroller, Jean-Louis (January 1996). "Le Potez XV et ses dérivés (3^{e} partie)". Avions: Toute l'aéronautique et son histoire (in French) (34): 32–35. ISSN 1243-8650.
- Cortet, Pierre & Coroller, Jean-Louis (February 1996). "Le Potez XV et ses dérivés (4^{e} partie)". Avions: Toute l'aéronautique et son histoire (in French) (35): 16–17. ISSN 1243-8650.
- Cortet, Pierre & Coroller, Jean-Louis (March 1996). "Le Potez XV serbes (5^{e} partie)" [The Serbian Potez XVs]. Avions: Toute l'aéronautique et son histoire (in French) (36): 28–30. ISSN 1243-8650.
