= Potez 23 =

French prototype fighter biplane

General information
- Type: Fighter
- National origin: France
- Manufacturer: Potez
- Designer: Henry Potez
- Status: Cancelled
- Primary user: France
- Number built: 1

History
- Manufactured: 1923
- Developed from: Potez XV
- Variant: Potez 25

The Potez 23 was a prototype French single-engine fighter biplane designed in 1923.

== History ==
The Potez 23 was built by Potez in response to the C1 fighter program issued by the STAé in 1923. The C1 fighter specification called for a speed of 240 kilometres per hour (150 mph), an armament of two forward firing machine guns, and both armored tanks and drop tanks.

The structure was made of wooden spars, the fuselage was covered with screwed and glued plywood, and the wings, empennage, and tail were covered in canvas. Wing tethering is simplified and builds on the experience gained on the Potez XV.

The aircraft did achieve the required performance and was not accepted for production. However, it was developed into the Potez 25.

== Specifications ==
Data from The Complete Book of Fighters

General characteristics

- Crew: 1
- Length: 7.60 m (24 ft 11 in)
- Wingspan: 10.50 m (34 ft 5 in)
- Height: 3.12 m (10 ft 3 in)
- Wing area: 32.00 m^{2} (344.4 sq ft)
- Empty weight: 1,115 kg (2,458 lb)
- Gross weight: 1,540 kg (3,395 lb)
- Powerplant: 1 × Lorraine-Dietrich 12Db water-cooled V12 engine, 300 kW (400 hp)

Performance

- Maximum speed: 225 km/h (140 mph, 121 kn) at 4,000 m (13,000 ft)
- Time to altitude: 18 minutes to 4,000 m (13,000 ft)

Armament

- Guns: 2× 7.7mm machine-guns
