= Latécoère 14 =

General information
- Type: Airliner
- National origin: France
- Manufacturer: Latécoère
- Designer: Marcel Moine
- Number built: 1

History
- First flight: October 1923

The Latécoère 14 and Latécoère 16 were similar French passenger and postal aircraft of advanced design built in 1923. They differed chiefly in engine power. Only one of each was constructed. The 14's type number was reused for an unrelated parasol wing prototype that was basis of the more successful Latécoère 17.

== Development and design ==
The types 14 and 16 were designed to transport a mixture of passengers and post, partly in response to the experiences of Lignes Aeriennes Latécoère with the recently introduced Breguet 14T, a transport version of a World War I reconnaissance and bomber aircraft. Two examples, very similar apart from their engines, were flown in October 1923 and were sufficiently interesting to be purchased by the government the following month.

Each was a high-wing cantilever monoplane with a wing root thickness/chord ratio of 27%, thinning to 12% outboard. In plan the half-wings were trapezoidal with only slight leading edge sweep and angled tips. Ailerons occupied the outer halves of the trailing edge. Structurally they were of mixed construction, built around twin wood and metal spars and fabric covered.

The Latécoère 14 was powered by a 220 kW (300 hp) Renault 12Fe water-cooled V12 engine in the nose with its rectangular radiator in front of a flat-sided cowling. An oblique exhaust pipe protruded from its upper surface. The more powerful Latécoère 16 had a 300 kW (400 hp) Lorraine 12D, another water-cooled V12. Its radiator was mounted below the nose on the forward undercarriage legs.

Behind the different engines of the two models, the basic fuselage was the same duralumin tube structure for each, the surface defined with wooden stringers. The forward part was dural covered and the rest with fabric. The pilot's open cockpit was high up over the wing leading edge and passengers were seated in a cabin below the wing. That of the type 14 was basic and provided three seats; in the more powerful type 16 it was divided into two with a transverse partition, each compartment accommodating two passengers more comfortably and lit by two windows, one sliding for ventilation, on each side. Each was entered by its own port-side door.

The metal-framed, canvas covered empenage was conventional, with a clipped-triangular tailplane bearing straight-edged, balanced elevators with angled tips. The two models had somewhat different fins, the 14's short and trapezoidal, the 16's taller and almost triangular, mounting a tall, broad, unbalanced rudder which reached down to the keel and worked in an elevator cut-out.

The undercarriage was conventional and fixed, with a track of 2 m (79 in). The mainwheeels were on a single faired axle provided with shock absorbers and supported at each end with W-struts from the lower fuselage. There was a tailskid at the rear.

Flight testing, with Enderlin at the controls, began in October 1923.

== Operational history ==
Lignes Aériennes Latécoère tested the Latécoère 14 against the Breguet 14T, which had the same Renault engine. The Breguet was faster but carried only half the payload.

The more powerful Latécoère 16 looked rather more promising. It flew to Paris in December 1924 and was displayed at the annual Salon, but little more was heard of it. Instead, Latécoère concentrated on a second design, also referred to as the Latécoère 14, which was a smaller aircraft with a thinner section parasol wing. It became the prototype of the better-selling Latécoère 17.

== Variants ==
Latécoère 14
220 kW (300 hp) Renault 12Fe. Three passengers. Trapezoidal vertical tail.
Latécoère 16
300 kW (400 hp) Lorraine 12D. Four passengers. Triangular vertical tail.

== Specifications (type 16) ==
Data from Les Ailes, December 1924 except where noted

General characteristics

- Crew: One
- Capacity: Four passengers
- Length: 12.80 m (42 ft 0 in)
- Wingspan: 17.80 m (58 ft 5 in)
- Height: 3.50 m (11 ft 6 in)
- Wing area: 48.0 m^{2} (517 sq ft)
- Airfoil: Göttingen 435 inboard, 430 outboard
- Empty weight: 1,670 kg (3,682 lb)
- Gross weight: 2,500 kg (5,512 lb) payload 350 kg (770 lb)
- Fuel capacity: 540 L (120 imp gal; 140 US gal)
- Powerplant: 1 × Lorraine 12D water-cooled V8, 300 kW (400 hp)
- Propellers: 2-bladed

Performance

- Maximum speed: 185 km/h (115 mph, 100 kn) at sea level
- Service ceiling: 4,500 m (14,800 ft)
- Time to altitude: less than 1 hr to 4,100 m (13,500 ft)
- Take-off distance: 142 m (466 ft)
- Landing speed: 90 km/h (56 mph; 49 kn)
- Landing distance: 142 m (466 ft)
