= Villiers IV =

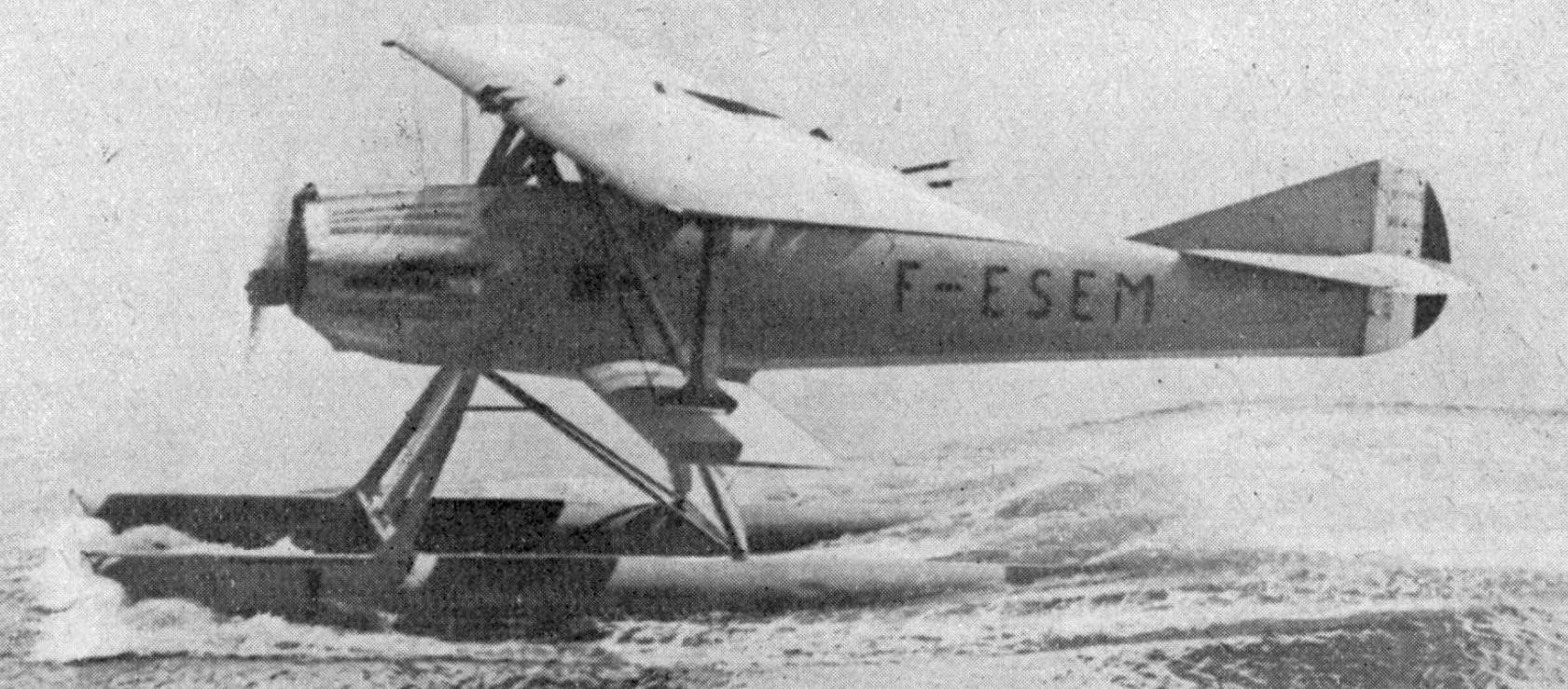

General information
- Type: Shipboard single seat reconnaissance aircraft
- National origin: France
- Manufacturer: Ateliers d'Aviation François Villiers
- Number built: 2

History
- First flight: 1925

The Villiers IV or Villiers 4 was a French two seat naval floatplane. Two were built, the first with twin floats and the second with one. The first was short-lived but the second set several world and national records; it later became the Villiers XI.

== Design ==
As a shipboard aircraft the Villier IV was required to have, in addition to the normal equipment of a two-seat military machine, folding wings and tow and hoist points. It also had to be well provided with navigation, radio and visual signalling equipment.

It was a single bay sesquiplane. Like most Villiers aircraft, the wingplans were strictly rectangular in plan apart from a shallow cut-out over the forward cockpit; the upper wings had three times the area of the lower. They were built around spruce box spars, fabric covered and braced together by an outward and forward leaning interplane strut on each side. The lower wings were attached to the lower fuselage longerons and braced to the upper longerons with single struts leaning inwards at about 45°. The upper wing was held over the fuselage by a fore and aft pair of W-form struts, one to each of its two spars. Wing folding was achieved with hinges on the rear longerons, immediately outside of the centre section to fuselage struts. There were full span ailerons, fitted only on the upper wing. A pair of upper wing hoisting points enabled the Villier IV to be lifted back on board its ship by a crane.

The fuselage of the Type IV was built around six spruce longerons with stringers, formers and poplar plywood skinning but no internal cross-bracing producing a semi-monocoque structure. Its engine was a 450 hp (340 kW) Lorraine-Dietrich water-cooled W-12 with a Lamblin radiator mounted transversely under it. Aft, the pilot's cockpit was largely under the wing despite the trailing edge cut-out to improve the field of fire from the gunner's cockpit behind him. The gunner had a pair of Lewis guns on a flexible mount and the pilot controlled a fixed pair of synchronised Vickers machine guns firing through the propeller arc. At the rear both fin and tailplane were triangular; the later, placed at the top of the fuselage could be adjusted on the ground. The rudder was curved, broad and reached down to the keel. The elevators were balanced, curved edged and had a cut-out for rudder movement.

The first Type IV had a pair of floats, about 7.8 m (25 ft 7 in) and 3.1 m (10 ft 2 in) apart, single stepped, round topped in cross-section and with hard chine but almost flat bottoms. These were mounted on an axle just forward of the wing leading edge, supported at its centre by a V-strut from the lower fuselage longerons and at its extremities by struts at about 45° to the same points. Under the trailing edge a W-form strut linked the longerons and floats, allowing passage for bombs released from the central fuselage underside. Vertical legs transmitted landing forces to the lower wing just inboard of the folding line. The floats were made of spruce and ply covered; on the planing bottoms the ply was 8 mm (0.31 in) thick. A second example, the IVbis, had a single central main float, suitable for catapult launching, and a small, stabilizing float under each wing.

== Development ==
The date of the Type IV's first flight is not known but it was flying before August 1925. The second Type IV, usually known in the French journals as the 4bis, flew in 1926. Before the spring of 1927 it had been modified into the very similar Villiers Type XI which had a single, 7.5 m (24 ft 7 in), 1.5 m (4 ft 11 in) wide, single-stepped central float mounted on two pairs of lateral struts to the lower fuselage. Two small stabilizing floats were attached with pairs of outward leaning struts from the lower wing below the interplane struts. The Viliers IX and Type X were similar Type IV developments.

== Operational history ==
In the late summer of 1925 the first Type IV and its crew were lost during the grand prix for seaplanes held at Saint-Raphaël, Var.

Early in 1926 the single float IVbis, flown by Louis Demougeot, set world and national seaplane records. The world record was for speed over 100 km (62 mi) with a 500 kg (1,100 lb) load, set at 203.275 km/h (126.309 mph) on 13 May, which was still standing a year later. The French record was set on 27 April, when he took the Villiers to 4,881 m (16,014 ft) carrying the same load.

== Variants ==
Type IV
first example with twin floats, second (IVbis) with a single, central float.
Type IX
Twin float.
Type X
Twin floats.
Type XI
IVbis modified, single float.

== Specifications (Type IV) ==
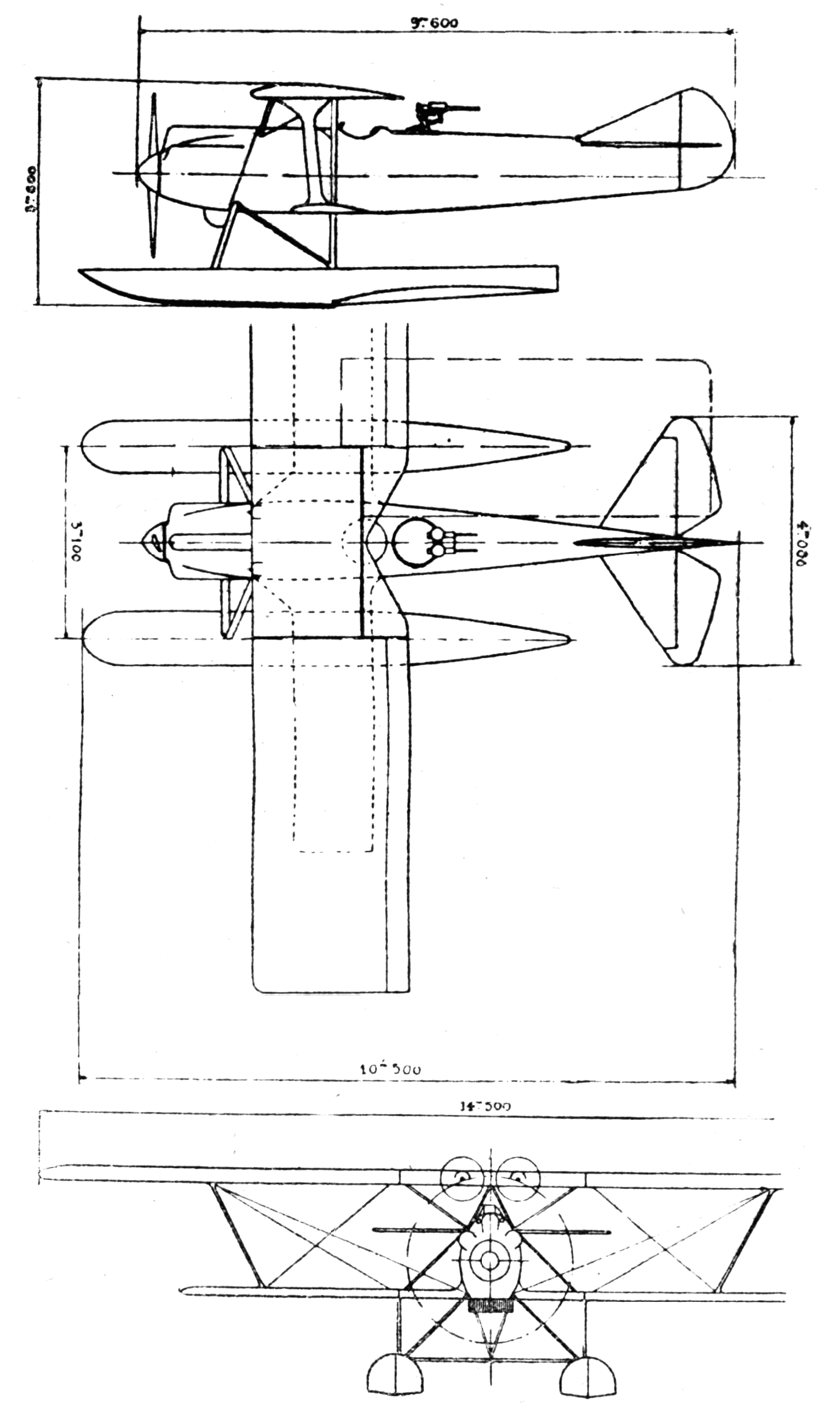
Villiers IV 3-view drawing from L'Aérophile March,1927

Data from L'Aérophile March 1927

General characteristics

- Crew: two
- Length: 10.50 m (34 ft 5 in)
- Upper wingspan: 14.50 m (47 ft 7 in)
- Height: 3.60 m (11 ft 10 in)
- Wing area: 48 m^{2} (520 sq ft) (upper wing 36 m^{2} (390 sq ft), lower wing 12 m^{2} (130 sq ft))
- Airfoil: Göttingen 436, slightly modified
- Empty weight: 1,708 kg (3,765 lb)
- Gross weight: 2,465 kg (5,434 lb)
- Fuel capacity: 282 kg (622 lb)
- Powerplant: 1 × Lorraine-Dietrich 12Eb water-cooled W-12, 340 kW (450 hp) ^{engine designation from}
- Propellers: 2-bladed

Performance

- Maximum speed: 202 km/h (126 mph, 109 kn)
- Minimum control speed: 95 km/h (59 mph, 51 kn)
- Range: 640 km (400 mi, 350 nmi)
- Endurance: 4 hr
- Service ceiling: 5,800 m (19,000 ft)
- Time to altitude: 40 min to 4,500 m (14,800 ft)

Armament

- fixed pair of 7.7 mm (0.303 in) synchronised Vickers machine guns firing through the propeller arc
- pair of 7.7 mm (0.303 in) Lewis guns on flexible mounting in rear cockpit
