= Potez 50 =

French biplane of the 1930s

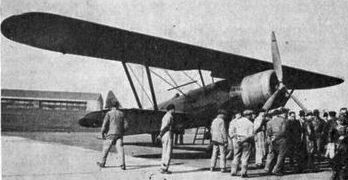

General information
- Type: Reconnaissance aircraft, bomber aircraft or night fighter
- National origin: France
- Manufacturer: Aéroplanes Henry Potez
- Number built: at least 3

History
- First flight: Before July 1931
- Variant: Potez 506

The Potez 50 or Potez 50 A2 was a French two seat military multi-role aircraft, first flown in 1931. It did not go into service but seven variants using five different engines were produced, one of them setting several speed with useful load records and another, the Potez 506, setting three altitude world records.

== Design ==
The Potez 50 was a single bay sesquiplane. Both upper and lower wings were in two parts and were unswept with constant chord, though the trailing edge of the upper wing tapered outboard into rounded tips. The lower wing had a smaller chord as well as being about one third shorter. Both were built around two spruce and plywood box spars and were fabric covered. The outward leaning pairs of interplane struts were closer on the lower wing as its spars were closer together; additional wire bracing completed the structure. The upper wing was braced over the fuselage on parallel pairs of outward and slightly backward leaning cabane struts to the upper fuselage; the lower wings were attached to the fuselage. The wings lacked dihedral and were mounted with marked stagger; only the upper wing carried ailerons, which occupied about half the span.

The Potez 50 and its variants were powered by five different nose-mounted engines, two inlines and three radials, detailed below. The first of these was a 450 kW (600 hp) Lorraine 12Fd Courlis water-cooled W-12 engine, enclosed by a close fitting metal cowling which followed the contours of its three-cylinder banks. There was a large, rectangular, honeycomb radiator on the fuselage underside at the rear of the engine, equipped with a shutter. Behind the engine the fuselage was built around four longerons making it flat sided though with rounded ply decking; the central part of the fuselage around the cockpits was also ply skinned, with fabric aft. The pilot's open cockpit was under an angular cut-out in the upper trailing edge which widened his field of view; he controlled a fixed, forward firing machine gun and the gunner/observer's position close behind had a pair of machine guns on a flexible mount as well as radio and photographic equipment.

At the rear the empennage was conventional, with a cropped triangular tailplane mounted on top of the fuselage and braced from below on each side by an inverted V-strut, allowing its incidence to be varied in flight. Its elevators were separate and balanced. The Potez 50 had an almost triangular fin and a rounded, unbalanced rudder which reached to the keel.

The undercarriage was fixed with the mainwheels under aircraft fairings and on split axles centrally mounted on a transverse V-strut from the central lower fuselage. The track was 2.70 m (8 ft 10 in). Short, faired legs with rubber shock absorbers and drag struts were attached to the outer lower fuselage. The steerable tailskid also had a rubber damper.

== Operational history ==
Potez 50

The date of the first flight of the Potez 50 is not known but it had already been tested by the end of June 1931 as it was selected, along with three other prototypes, to make a publicity tour of eastern Europe which began on 5 July. In October, still Courlis powered, it was at the government testing field at Villacoublay, but in December it was back at the Potez base at Meaulte with an unspecified 480 kW (650 hp) Hispano-Suiza engine. By March another engine change had been made, this time to the Salmson 18AB, an eighteen-cylinder air-cooled radial producing the same power as the Hispano.

Two Potez 50s were flying by the summer of 1932, one with an Hispano engine and the other with another radial, a supercharged, fourteen cylinder, 520 kW (700 hp) Gnome-Rhône Mistral Major. They both contested the Circuit des Alpes, with the Hispano powered aircraft officially entered and placed second, under two minutes behind the winner and the second, unofficial entrant six minutes behind. The Potez 50 A2, powered by a 520 kW (700 hp) 14Kbrs Mistral Major engine, set two international records at Villacoublay on 16 September 1932 carrying a useful loads of 500 and 1,000 kg (1,100 and 2,200 lb) over 500 km (310 mi); the heavier load was carried at 294.194 km/h (182.804 mph). In December it was on display at the 1932 Paris Aero Show, identified as the Potez 503.

In March 1933 Lemoine set further French and world load carrying speed records, some at least in a Potez 505 14Kbrs powered variant. The most significant records, set by the Potez 506 variant with a more powerful 600 kW (800 hp) K14drs engine, were those of altitude: it twice set new absolute world records, first at 13,661 m (44,820 ft) by Lemoine on 28 September 1933 and then at 14,843 m (48,698 ft) by Détré on 14 August 1936. The same aircraft was flown by Maryse Hilsz to set a new women's fixed-wing aircraft altitude record of 14,309 m (46,946 ft) on 23 June 1936 which still stood in 1948.

During May 1935 Détré demonstrated the Potez 501 with a 750 kW (1,000 hp) Hispano-Suiza 14AA (Type 79) fourteen cylinder radial engine.

The pre-war French civil aircraft register records three Potez 50s, one a 501 and the other two 502s. One of the latter was converted into the 503.

== Variants ==
Potez 50
military prototype as described, initially with Lorraine 12Fd Courlis engine.
Potez 501
520 kW (700 hp) Gnome-Rhône 14Kbrs Mistral Major. It later had a 750 kW (1,000 hp) Hispano-Suiza 14AA two-row radial.
Potez 502
two built.
Potez 503
Gnome-Rhône 14K. Set 1932 speed with load records, displayed at 1932 Paris Salon. one converted from 502.
Potex 504
Potez 505
Gnome-Rhône 14Kbrs Mistral Major.
Potez 506
600 kW (800 hp) Gnome-Rhône 14Kdrs Mistral Major with higher compression and improved supercharger, driving a three blade propeller. Set three world altitude records.

== Specifications (Potez 50, Courlis engine) ==
Data from Les Ailes March 1932

General characteristics

- Crew: Two
- Length: 9.496 m (31 ft 2 in)
- Wingspan: 14.80 m (48 ft 7 in)
- Height: 3.638 m (11 ft 11 in)
- Wing area: 42 m^{2} (450 sq ft)
- Empty weight: 1,640 kg (3,616 lb) equipped
- Max takeoff weight: 2,700 kg (5,952 lb)
- Fuel capacity: 360 L (79 imp gal; 95 US gal)
- Powerplant: 1 × Lorraine 12Fd Courlis water-cooled W-12 engine, 450 kW (600 hp)
- Propellers: 2-bladed

Performance

- Maximum speed: 244 km/h (152 mph, 132 kn) at ground level
- Cruise speed: 200 km/h (120 mph, 110 kn)
- Range: 650 km (400 mi, 350 nmi)
- Service ceiling: 7,200 m (23,600 ft) absolute
- Time to altitude: 9.2 min to 3,000 m (9,800 ft)

Armament

- 1×fixed, forward firing machine gun
- 2×machine guns on a flexible mount in rear cockpit
