= Potez 27 =

French reconnaissance biplane

General information
- Type: Reconnaissance aircraft
- National origin: France
- Manufacturer: Potez; PWS
- Number built: 206

History
- First flight: 1924
- Developed from: Potez XV; Potez 25

The Potez 27 was a French reconnaissance biplane first flown in 1924. 175 were operated by the Polish Air Force, most built in Poland by PWS under licence. Others went to Romania, where they were also used as light bombers.

== Design and development ==
The Potez 27 was a combination of the wings of the Potez 25 with the fuselage, empennage, engine, landing gear and cabane struts of the Potez XV. The result of this marriage was an unequal span, single bay biplane with a pair of parallel, outward leaning interplane struts on each side, aided by flying wires. The lower wings were attached to the lower fuselage longerons and the upper wings supported over the fuselage on each side by a linked pair of vertical cabane struts from the upper longeron.

The fuselage was flat sided, with a curved decking over most of its length, though the upper engine cowling followed around each cylinder bank of the 400 hp (298 kW) Lorraine-Dietrich 12Db upright V-12 engine. This was water cooled, with Lamblin cylindrical radiators under the wings and between the V-struts on which the rigid axle and wheels of the tailskid undercarriage were mounted. The two cockpits were arranged in tandem, with the pilot under a cut-out in the upper wing trailing edge for better vision; the gunner was equipped with twin Lewis guns on a rotatable, Scarff type mounting. The fin was broad and slightly curved, with a balanced rudder merging smoothly into it; the tailplane was mounted on the top of the fuselage, strut braced from below and carrying balanced elevators.

The Potez 27 was first flown in 1924. It was not adopted by L'Armée de l'Air but twenty were sold to the Polish Air Force and another one hundred and fifty-five were built under licence for them by Podlaska Wytwórnia Samolotów. A further thirty were sold to Romania, who used them both as reconnaissance and light bomber aircraft. The first Type 27 continued to fly in France, for example at the Rally of the Aéro-Club de Auvergne in September 1926 and at Villacoublay in May 1928.

== Operators ==
Poland

- Polish Air Force

Romania

- Romanian Air Force

== Specifications ==
Data from L'Aéronautque (December 1924)

General characteristics

- Crew: Two
- Length: 8.70 m (28 ft 7 in)
- Wingspan: 13.80 m (45 ft 3 in)
- Wing area: 45 m^{2} (480 sq ft)
- Empty weight: 1,250 kg (2,756 lb)
- Gross weight: 1,905 kg (4,200 lb)
- Powerplant: 1 × Lorraine-Dietrich 12Db 12-cylinder upright V-12 engine, water cooled, 300 kW (400 hp)
- Propellers: 2-bladed

Performance

- Maximum speed: 215 km/h (134 mph, 116 kn) at sea level
- Service ceiling: 6,700 m (22,000 ft)
- Time to altitude: 12.33 minutes to 3,000 m (9,840 ft)

Armament

- Guns: Twin 0.303 in (7.7 mm) Lewis guns and Scarff type mounting in rear cockpit
- Bombs: Up to 200 kg (440 lb)
