= Lorraine 7M Mizar =

1920s French piston aircraft engine

7M Mizar
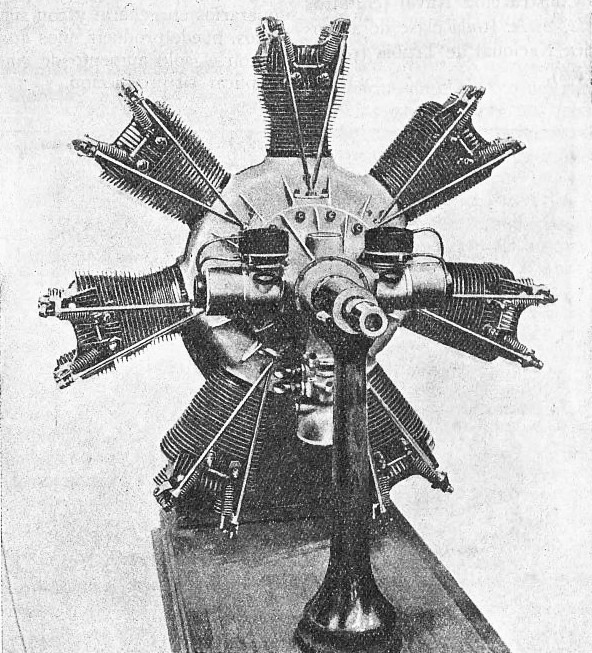
- Type: 7-cylinder air-cooled piston aero engine
- National origin: France
- Manufacturer: Lorraine-Dietrich

The Lorraine 7M Mizar, also called the Lorraine 240CV Mizar, was a seven-cylinder air-cooled radial engine designed and built in France during the 1920s and 1930s. Nominal power was given as 240 hp (180 kW) at 1500rpm (maximum continuous power), with a maximum output of 283 hp (211 kW) at 1800 rpm.

== Variants ==
7Ma Mizar
7Mb Mizar
7Me Mizar
7Mer Mizar

== Applications ==
- Aviméta 92
- Caudron C.251

== Specifications ==
Data from Société Générale Aeronautique

=== General characteristics ===
- Type: 7-cylinder air-cooled radial piston engine, left hand rotation (facing the propeller)
- Bore: 140 mm (5.51 in)
- Stroke: 150 mm (5.91 in)
- Displacement: 16.163 L (986.33 cu in)
- Length: 1,190 mm (46.85 in)
- Diameter: 1,240 mm (48.82 in)
- Dry weight: 265 kg (584 lb)

=== Components ===
- Valvetrain: pushrod operated overhead valves, two per cylinder
- Oil system: pressure fed
- Cooling system: air-cooled

=== Performance ===
- Power output: 283 hp (211 kW) at 1800 rpm (maximum)
  240 hp (180 kW) at 1500 rpm (maximum continuous)
- Compression ratio: 5
- Specific fuel consumption: 0.308 kg/(kW h) (0.507 lb/(hp h))
- Oil consumption: 0.0161 kg/(kW h) (0.0265 lb/(hp h))
