= Lorraine 12F Courlis =

1920s French piston aircraft engine

12F Courlis
- Type: Water-cooled W-12 piston engine
- National origin: France
- Manufacturer: Lorraine-Dietrich
- First run: Homologated 21 August 1929

The Lorraine 12F Courlis was a W-12 (broad arrow) aero engine introduced in France in 1929. It was not widely used.

== Design and development ==
In 1926 Lorraine introduced a series of V-12 and W-12 engines with steel cylinders screwed into aluminium alloy engine blocks. There were two W-12s which shared the name Courlis (Curlew), the first of them was the 12E which provided 340 kW (450 hp) from a swept volume of 24.4 L (1,490 cu in). This was followed by the larger 12F, giving 450 kW (600 hp) from 31.7 L (1,930 cu in).

The 12F was officially homologated on 21 August 1929 and displayed at the 1930 Paris Salon. Unlike the 12E, which powered many different aircraft types, the 12F was not so widely used.

== Variants ==
Lorraine 12Fa
Lorraine 12Fb
Lorraine 12Fd

== Applications ==
- Hanriot A.3 (1924 STAé specification ?)
- I.A.R. CW-8
- Nieuport-Delage NiD.540
- Nieuport-Delage NiD.580
- Nieuport-Delage NiD.623
- Potez 50
- SAB AB-20

== Specifications (12Fa) ==
Data from L'Aérophile January 1930

=== General characteristics ===
- Type: Water-cooled W-12 four-stroke engine
- Bore: 145 mm (5.7 in)
- Stroke: 160 mm (6.3 in)
- Displacement: 31.7 L (1,930 cu in)
- Length: 1.656 m (5 ft 5.2 in)
- Width: 1.140 m (3 ft 8.9 in)
- Height: 1.062 m (3 ft 5.8 in)
- Dry weight: 430 kg (950 lb) without propeller, with Viet starter

=== Components ===
- Valvetrain: 4 valves/cylinder, 3 overhead camshafts
- Fuel system: 2 fuel pumps; 6 Zenith carburetters with automatic altitude correction and heated inlets; 2 fixed advance magnetos
- Fuel type: Petrol
- Oil system: Pumped
- Cooling system: Centrifugal water pump
- Reduction gear: optional
- Construction: Steel cylinder in aluminium block; aluminium cylinder head; aluminium pistons; 5 bearing crankshaft

=== Performance ===
- Power output: 450 kW (600 hp) at 2,000 rpm nominal; maximum 490 kW (660 hp)
- Compression ratio: 6
- Specific fuel consumption: 0.34 kg/(kW.h) (0.51 lb/(hp.h))
- Oil consumption: 4.2 kg/h (9.3 lb/h)
