= Statue of James Cook, Fitzroy Gardens =

A Statue of James Cook is located by Cooks' Cottage in Fitzroy Gardens in Melbourne. It was originally created by Marc Clark in 1973 and moved to its current location in 1997.

It was erected in 1974 to help promote the housing estate of Endeavour Hills in south-eastern Melbourne. It was sited in the garden of the show home of Endeavour Hills. The statue was moved to another show home after the initial house was sold, and remained in the garden of an English doctor, Sylvia Smith. By 1996 the statue was owned by a dentist from Endeavour Hills, Mark Hassed. He tried unsuccessfully to sell the statue at auction, before donating it to the City of Melbourne in 1996. It became part of the Melbourne Open Air Sculpture Museum Trust and installed by Cooks' Cottage in Fitzroy Gardens in Melbourne in July 1997.

The statue honours Cook who in 1770 led a voyage with the first Europeans to the east coast of Australia.

== Description ==
The statue is a life-size standing statue in bronze of Cook and stands on brick paving. It was sculpted by Marc Clark. It is a life-sized sculpture of Cook. It originally stood on a base of black granite.

It is inscribed "Marc Clarke 1973 / Artist Marc Clark / Title Captain James Cook / Date 1973 / Donor Dr and Mrs Hassed".
