= Mary Gilbert =

Mary Gilbert was the first European woman to live in the Port Phillip settlement of Melbourne, Australia.

== Life ==
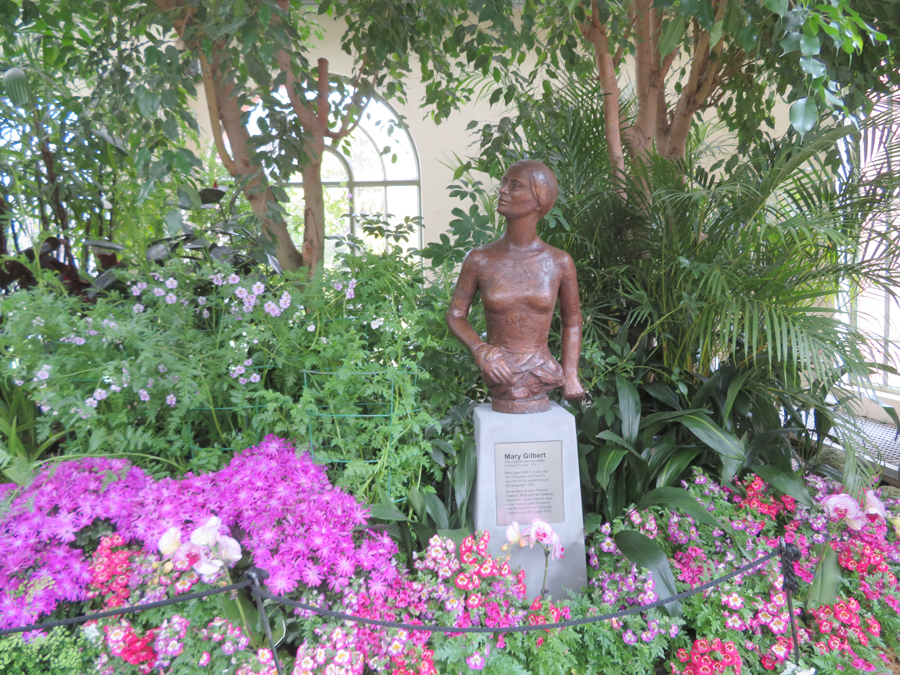
Stature of Mary Gilbert in Conservatory, Fitzroy Gardens

She was the daughter of one John Duff, and was married to James Gilbert, blacksmith. The Gilberts were pioneer settlers who disembarked on the banks of the Yarra River and set up camp on 30 August 1835. The schooner Enterprize, owned by John Pascoe Fawkner, had brought them and other settlers from Launceston, Tasmania, where she had married James at the age of eighteen.

The initial landing party included Captain John Lancey, master mariner, the landing party's leader and Fawkner's representative; George Evans, builder; carpenters William Jackson and Robert Hay Marr; ploughman Charles Wise; blacksmith James Gilbert and his pregnant wife, Mary; and Evan Evans, George Evans' servant.

On 29 December 1835, Mary gave birth to her son, James Melbourne Gilbert, the first European child born in the new district. She was given 500 acres (200 ha) of land and a town allotment. A life-sized bust of Mary Gilbert can be found at the Conservatory, in the Fitzroy Gardens. The sculpture was created by the Melbourne artist, Ailsa O'Connor (1921–1980).

On 30 April 1837, Mary gave birth to a second son, Charles Phillip Gilbert, also fathered by her husband, James. According to the transcription of her death, two other sons were John and William.

Although James (possibly later known as John) Melbourne Gilbert was not known to have any offspring, his younger brother Charles was known to have fathered at least eight children to his wife Amelia in both Victoria and New South Wales.

She was accidentally burnt to death in a bush fire at South Talbingo, Tumut River, New South Wales, on 20 February 1878, and buried on the Cumberland Range on 24 February that year.

== See also ==
- History of Melbourne
