= Cooks' Cottage =

Cottage museum in Melbourne, Australia

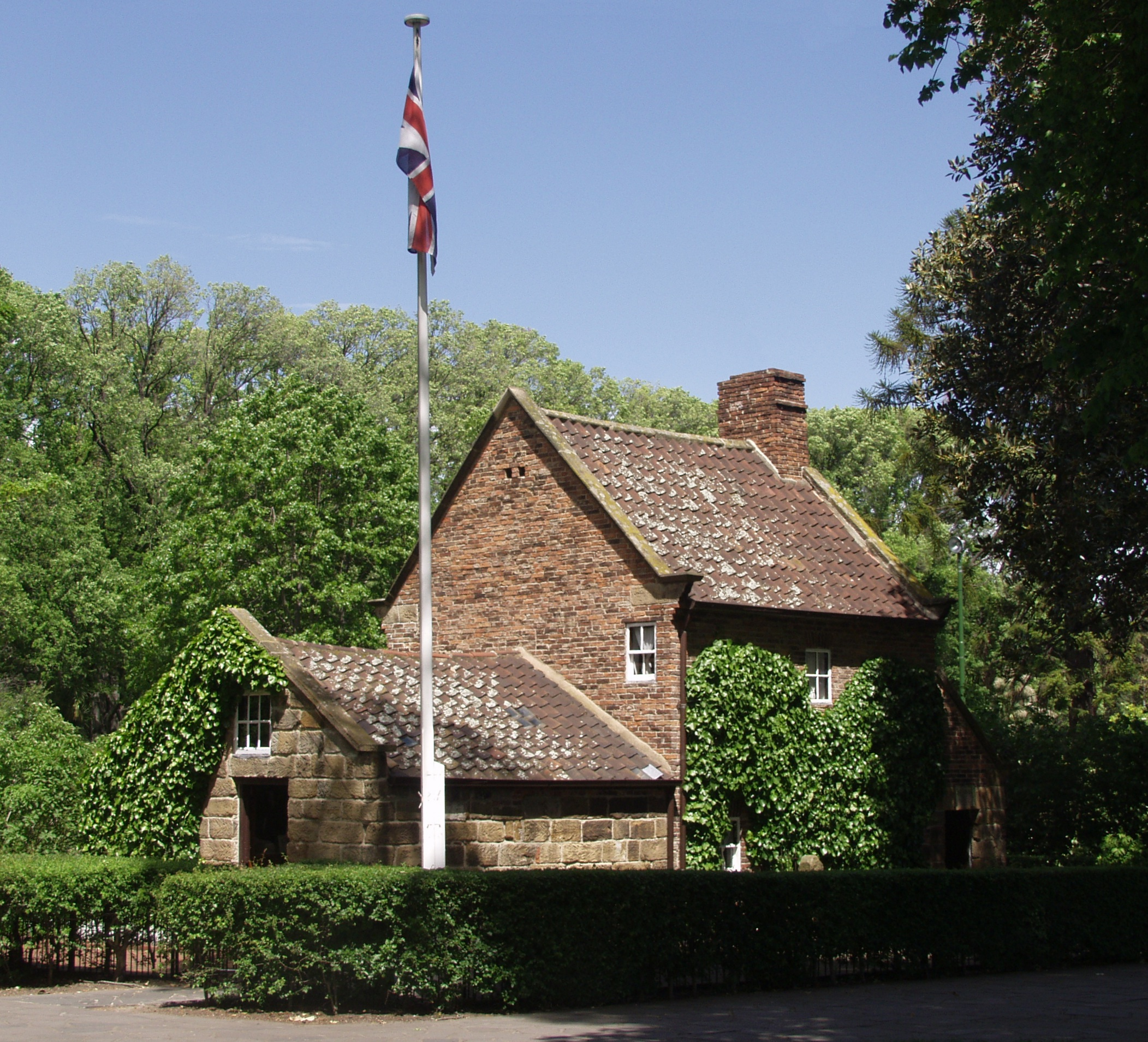
- Established: 15 October 1934
- Location: Fitzroy Gardens, Melbourne, Australia
- Coordinates: 37°48′52.16″S 144°58′46.02″E
- Website: whatson.melbourne.vic.gov.au/things-to-do/cooks-cottage

Cooks' Cottage, also known as Captain Cook's Cottage, is located in the Fitzroy Gardens, Melbourne, Australia. The cottage was constructed in 1755 in the English village of Great Ayton, North Yorkshire, by the parents of Captain James Cook, James and Grace Cook. It is a point of conjecture among historians whether James Cook, who was born in 1728, ever lived in the dwelling, but almost certainly he visited his parents at the house.

The building was purchased and brought to Melbourne in 1934 by the Australian philanthropist Sir Russell Grimwade.

The inside of the cottage is styled in the manner of the 18th century, and though very few of the items in the house are originals from the Cook family, all are antiques representative of furnishings of the period. Likewise, the volunteer guides dress in period costume.

== History ==
In 1933, the owner of the cottage decided to sell it with a condition of sale that the building remain in England. She was persuaded to change "England" to "the Empire", and accepted an Australian bid of £800 (£45,314 or A$80,556 in 2023 terms) by Russell Grimwade, as opposed to the highest local offer of £300 (£16,993 or A$30,209 in 2023 terms).

The cottage was deconstructed brick by brick and packed into 253 cases and 40 barrels for shipping on board Port Dunedin from Hull. Cuttings from ivy that adorned the house were also taken to be planted when the house was re-erected in Melbourne, though it is unclear whether the original plant survived fumigation by the Chief Quarantine Inspector of Plants for Victoria. Grimwade, a notable businessman and philanthropist, donated the house to the people of Victoria for the centenary anniversary of the settlement of Melbourne in October 1934. The reconstruction project was supervised by Percy Meldrum of Stephenson and Meldrum.

The cottage immediately became a popular tourist attraction. In 1978, further restoration work was carried out on the cottage. An English cottage garden has been established around the house, further adding to its period reconstruction.

== In popular culture ==
The cottage features in two scenes of the 2012 movie Any Questions for Ben?.

== Gallery ==
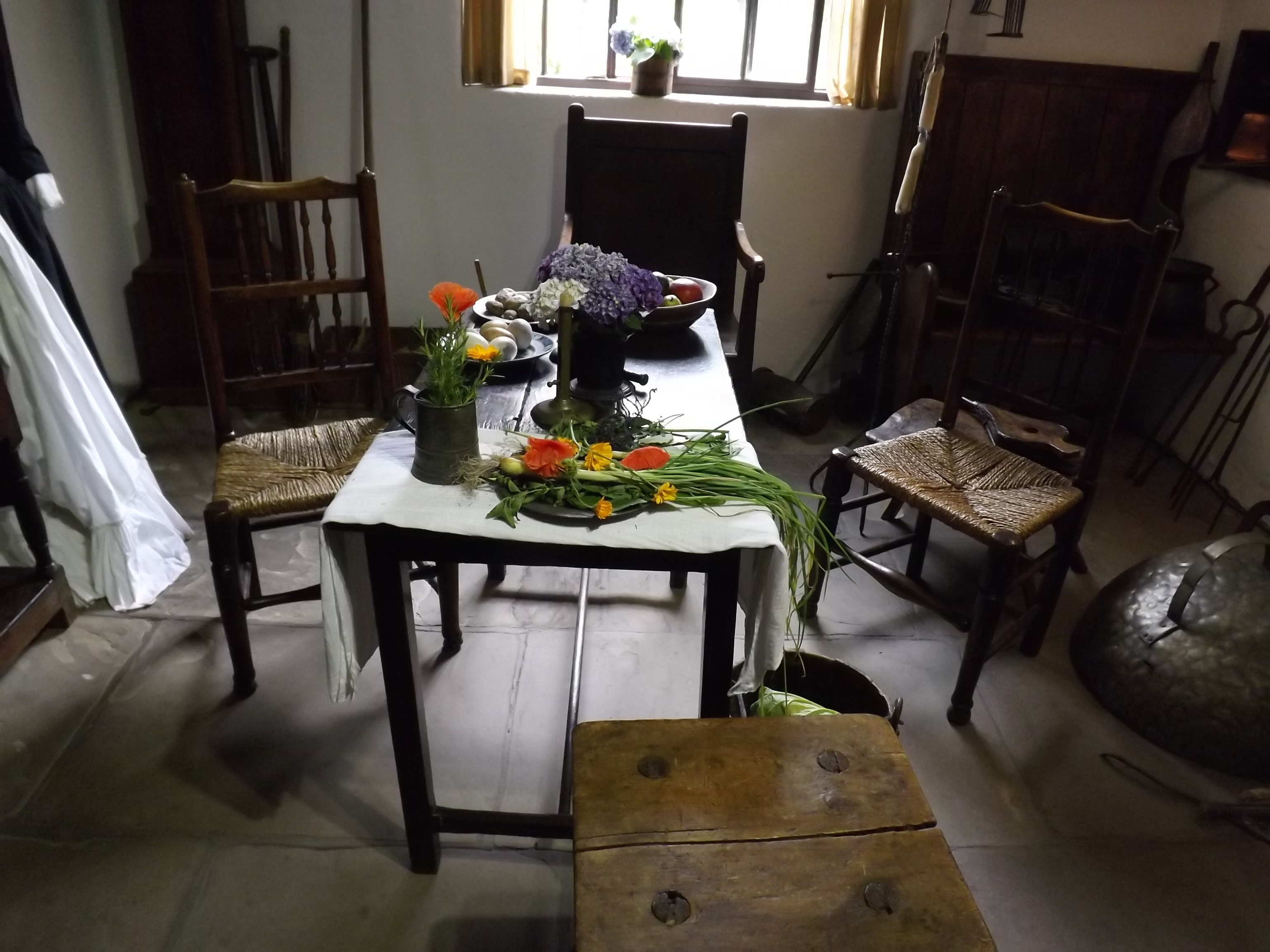

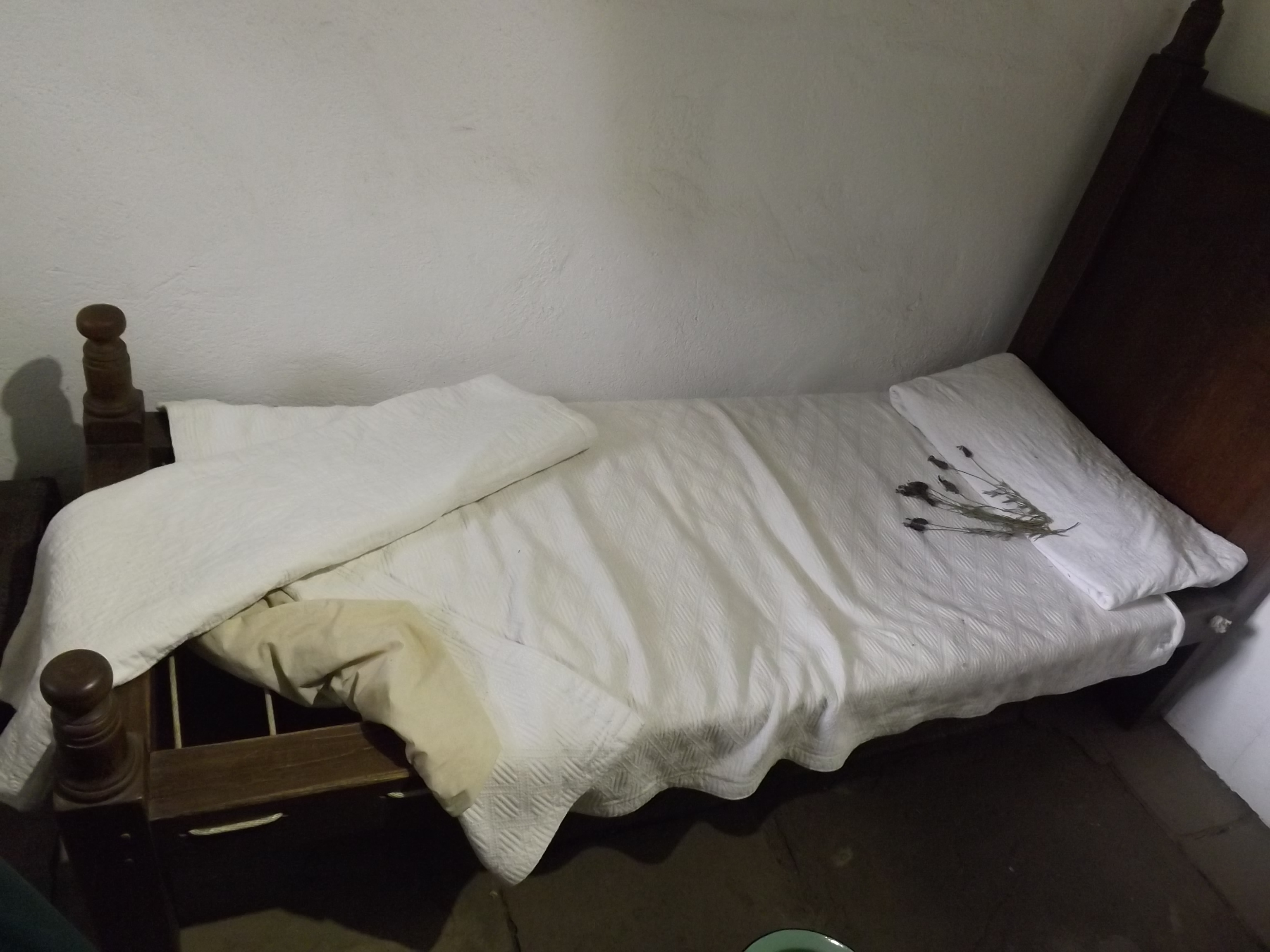

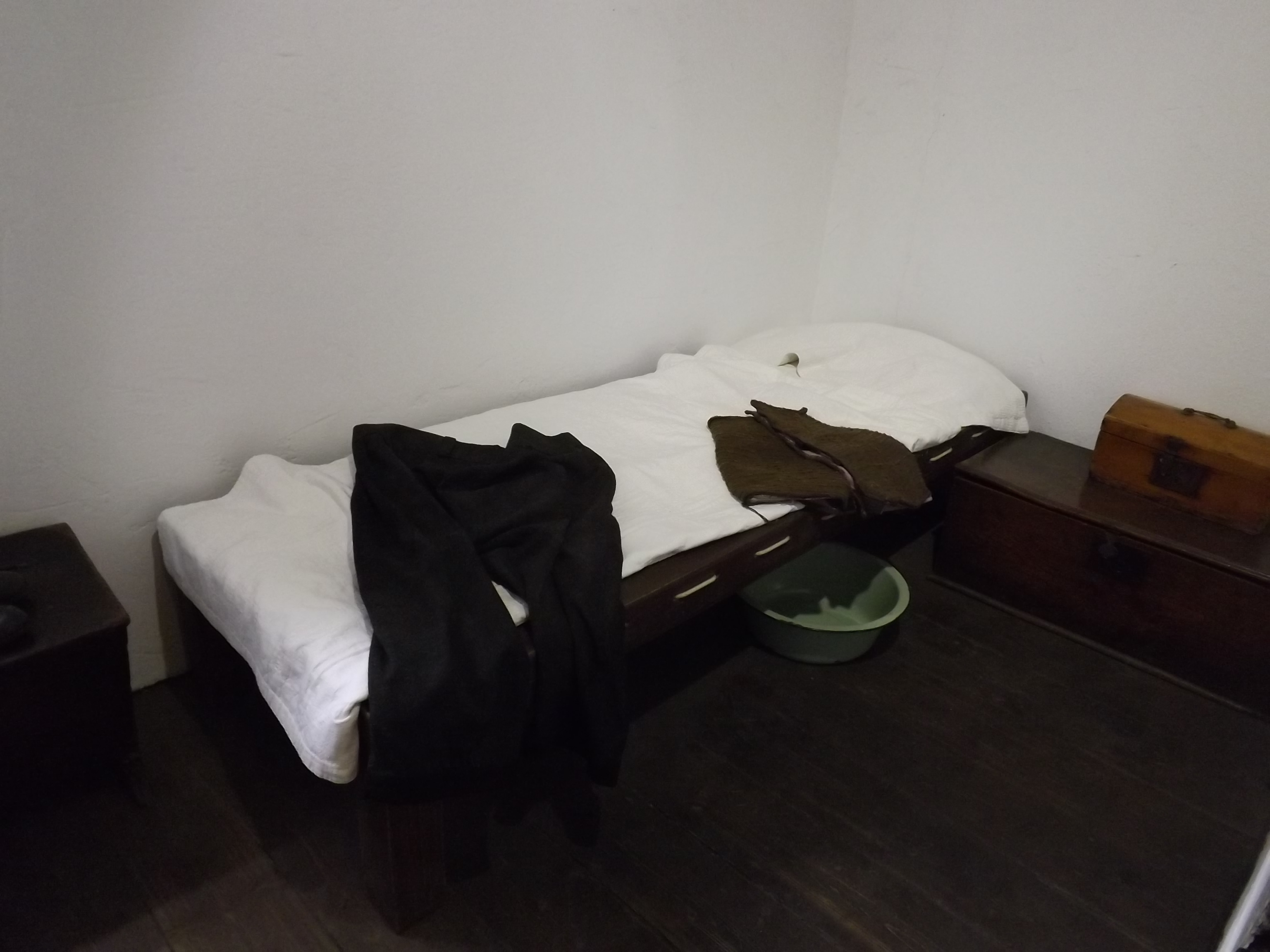

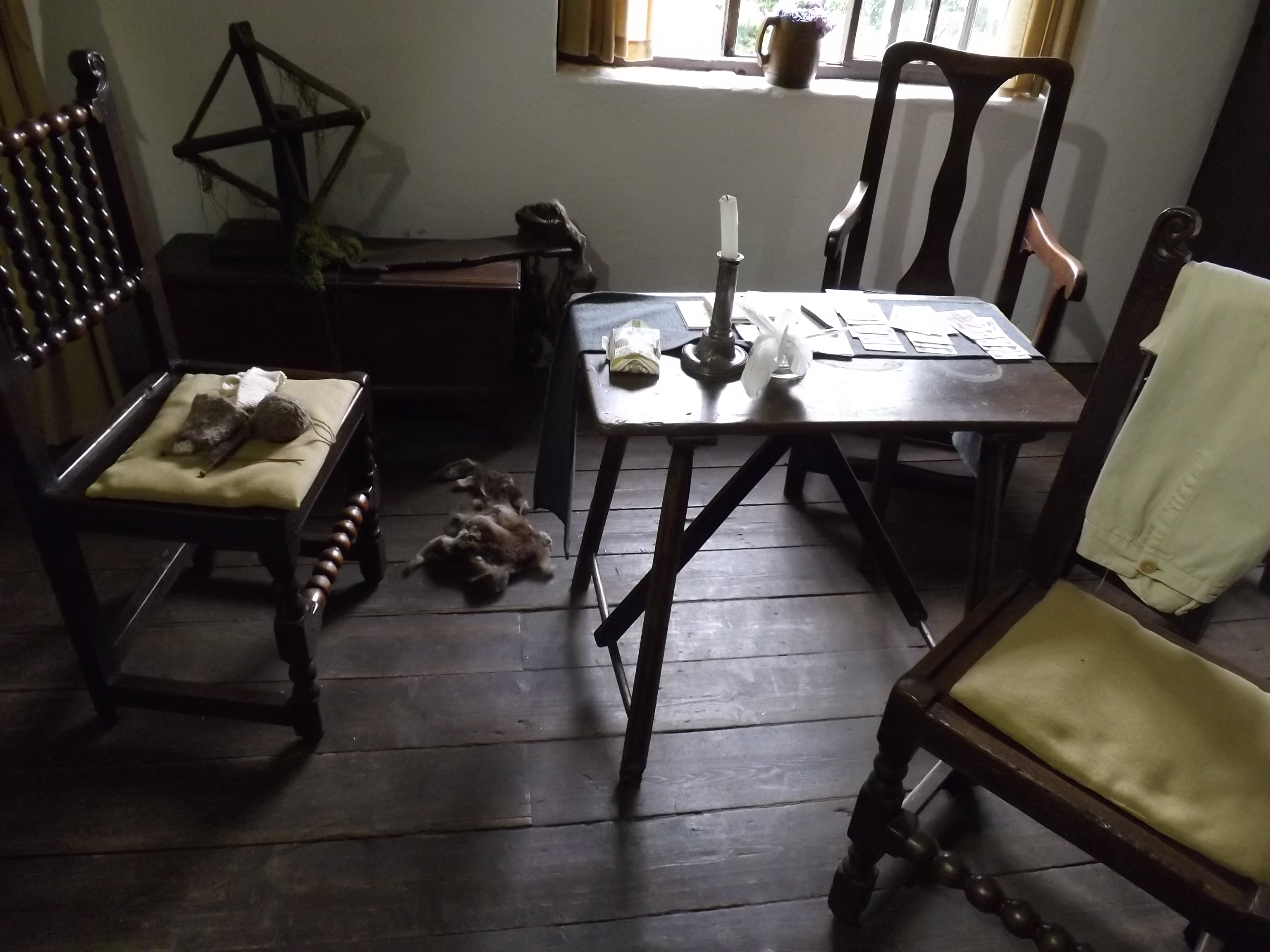

== See also ==
- Stewart Park, Middlesbrough – site of the cottage where Captain James Cook was born.
