= Fitzroy Gardens =

Public gardens in Melbourne, Victoria, Australia

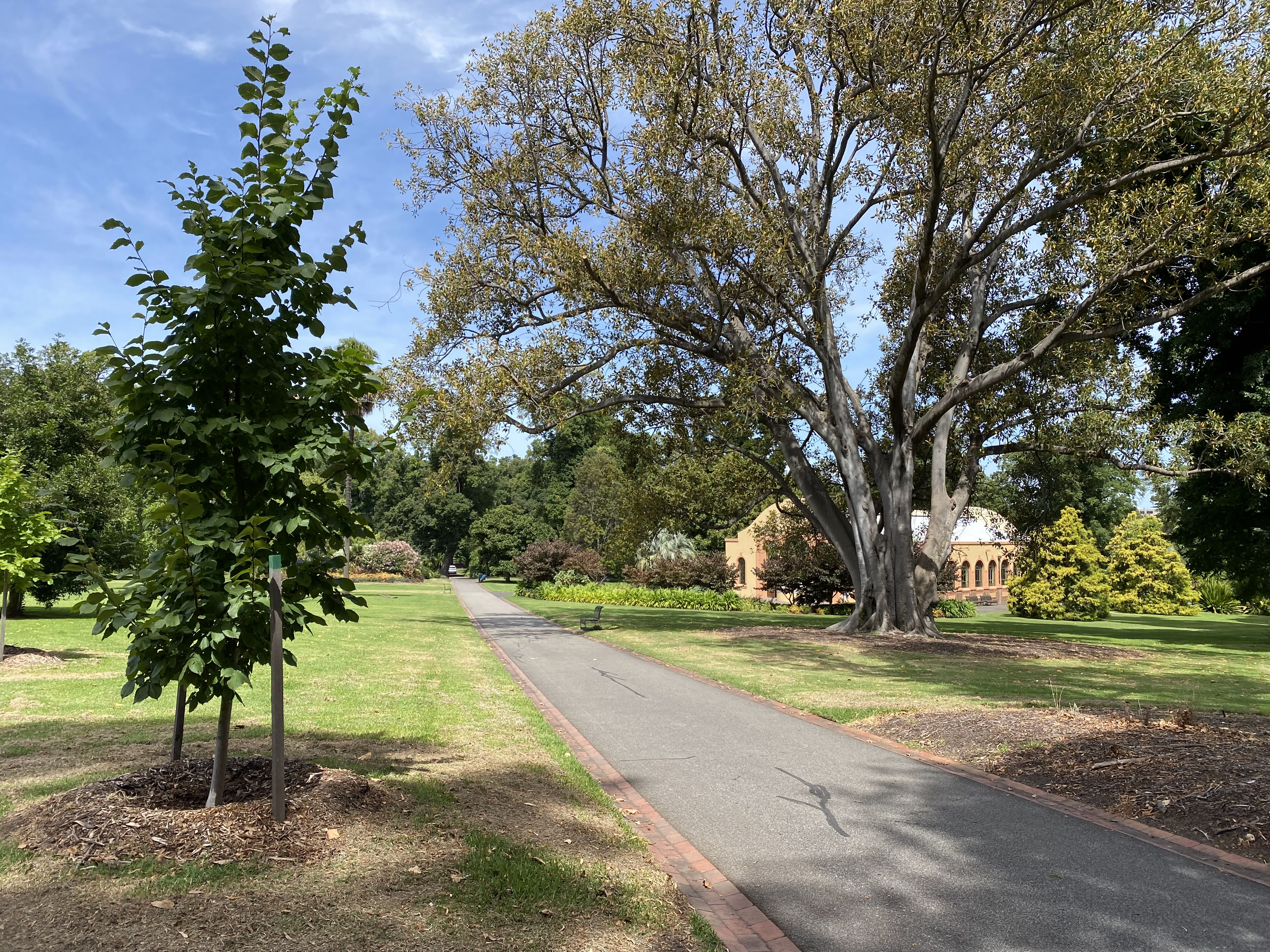
- A summer afternoon in the Gardens

- Location within Melbourne
- Interactive map of Fitzroy Gardens
- Type: Urban park
- Location: East Melbourne, Victoria, Australia
- Coordinates: 37°48′45″S 144°58′49″E
- Area: 26 ha (64 acres)
- Opened: 1848; 178 years ago
- Designer: Clement Hodgkinson
- Operator: City of Melbourne
- Open: All year
- Status: Open
- Paths: Sealed
- Terrain: Flat
- Vegetation: Australian natives; lawns; European gardens
- Species: c. 270 Ulmus procera and U. hollandica; Ficus macrophylla; F. platypoda; F. palmata; Quercus bicolor; Cedrus deodara; 19th century conifers; and others
- Public transit: – Parliament; –, –; – from Federation Square
- Landmarks: Conservatory; Cooks' Cottage; "Fairies' Tree"; model Tudor village; scarred tree
- Facilities: Band pavilion; drinking fountain; ornamental lake; playground; rotunda; seating; toilets; tree-lined avenues; visitor information centre and cafe
- Website: melbourne.vic.gov.au

Victorian Heritage Register
- Official name: Fitzroy Gardens
- Type: Registered place
- Designated: 26 August 1999
- Reference no.: H1834
- Heritage overlay no.: HO883
- Category: Parks, Gardens and Trees

Register of the National Estate
- Official name: Fitzroy Gardens
- Type: Defunct register
- Designated: undated
- Reference no.: 5216

The Fitzroy Gardens is a 26-hectare (64-acre) urban park located south-east of the city centre of Melbourne in East Melbourne, Victoria, Australia. The gardens are bounded by Clarendon Street, Albert Street, Lansdowne Street, and Wellington Parade with the Treasury Gardens across Lansdowne street to the west.

Established in 1848, the gardens are one of the major Victorian era landscaped gardens in Australia. Set within the gardens are an ornamental lake, a scarred tree, a visitor information centre and cafe, a conservatory, Cooks' Cottage (a house where the parents of James Cook lived, brought to Australia from England in the 1930s), tree-lined avenues, a model Tudor village, a band pavilion, a rotunda, the "Fairies' Tree", fountains and numerous sculptures.

The gardens were added to the Victorian Heritage Register on 6 August 1999 in recognition of their historical, aesthetic, architectural, scientific, and social significance. On an unknown date, the gardens and several associated structures in the gardens were added to the now defunct Register of the National Estate; and to a non-statutory list by the Victorian branch of the National Trust.

The gardens are located on the traditional lands of the Wurundjeri and is administered by the City of Melbourne.

== Description ==
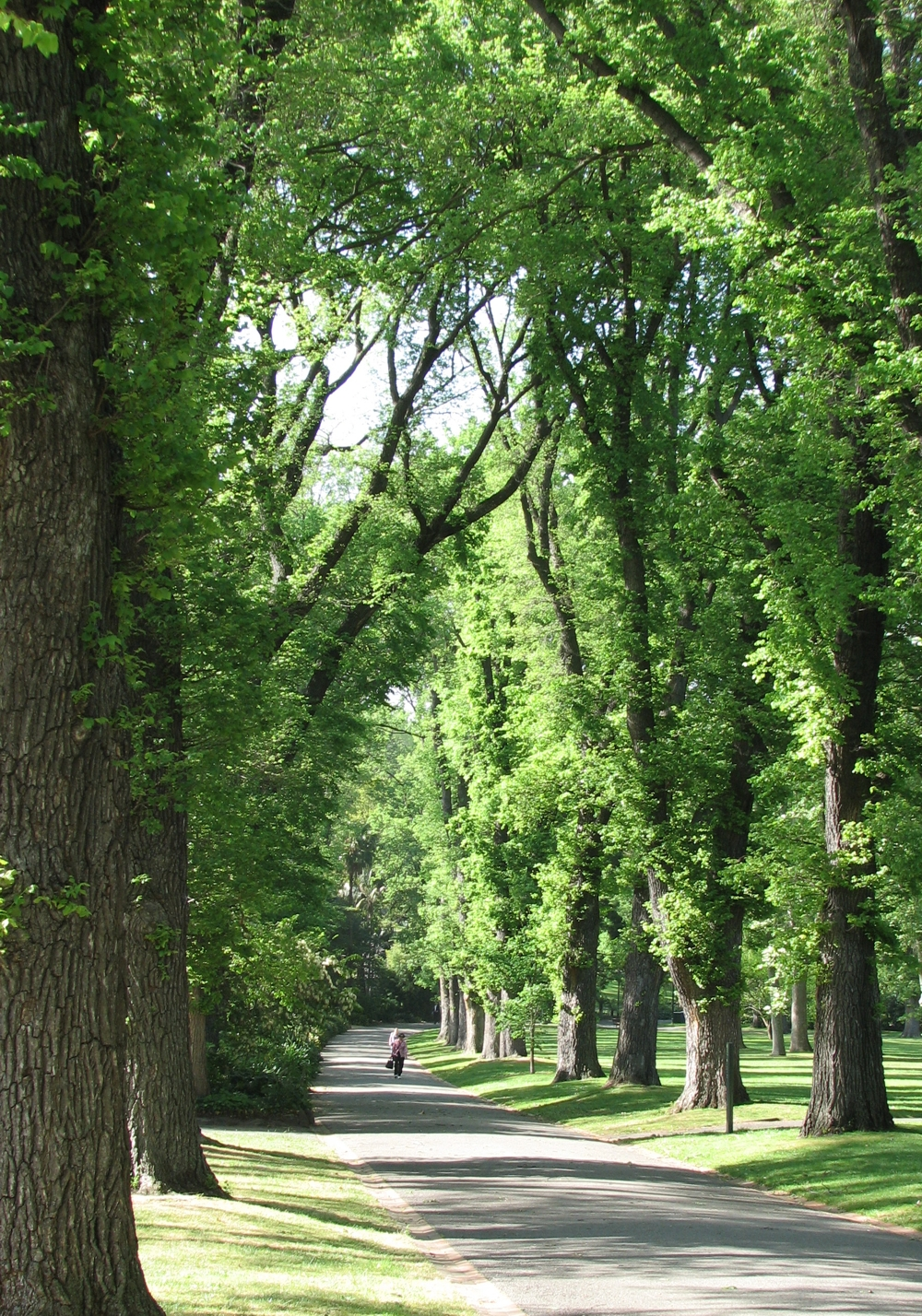
An avenue of English elms in the Gardens

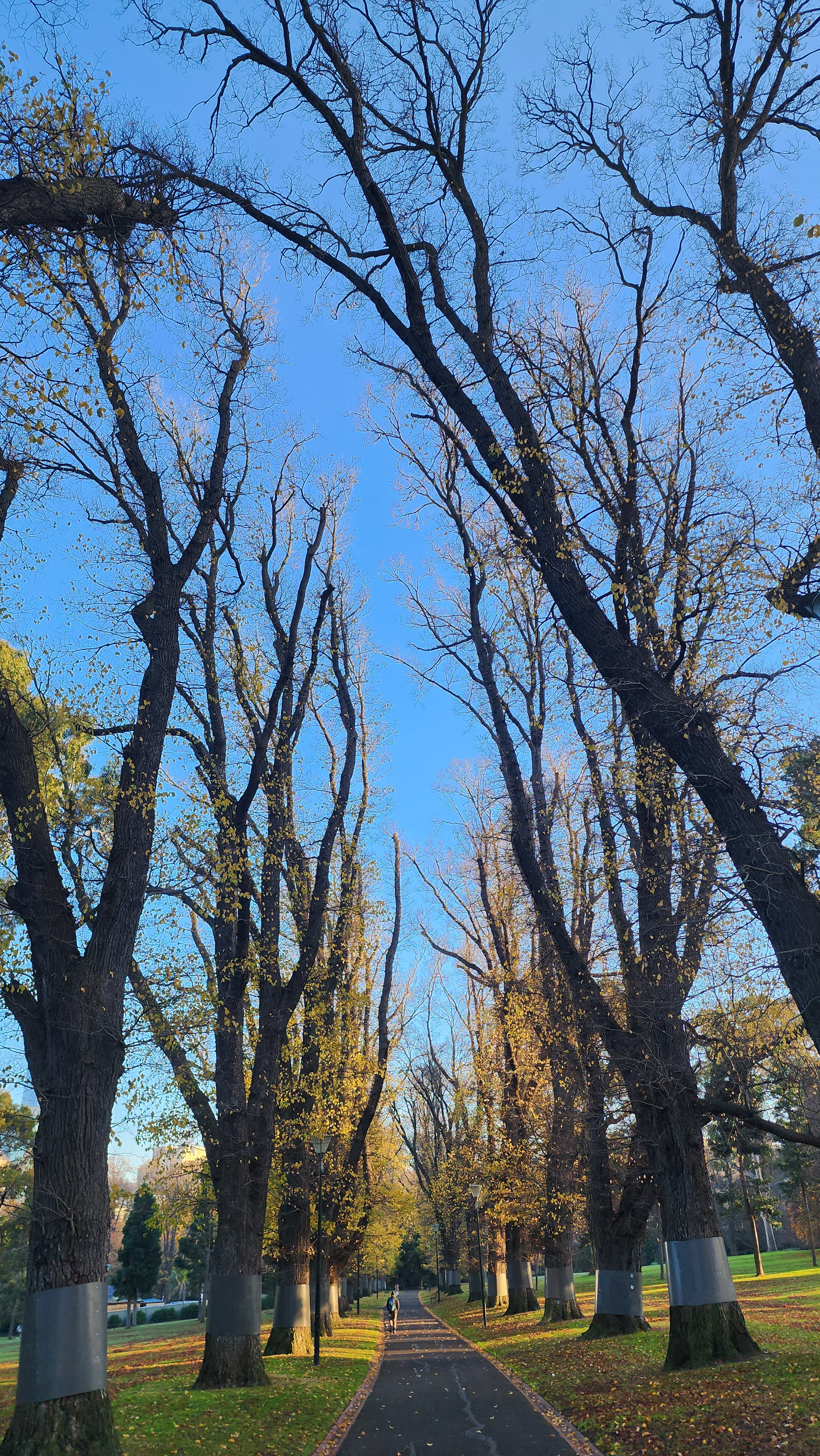
Fitzroy Gardens in winter

The most notable feature of the Gardens is the trees that line many of the pathways.

The land was originally swampy with a creek draining into the Yarra River. The gardens were initially designed by Clement Hodgkinson and planted by park gardener, James Sinclair, as a dense woodland with meandering avenues. The creek was landscaped with ferns and 130 willows, but that did not stop it smelling foul from the sewage from the houses of East Melbourne. The creek was used for irrigation of the western side of the gardens for fifty years. In the early 1900s the creek water substantially improved when sewerage mains were installed to the residences of East Melbourne.

In the early years quick growing blue gums and wattles were planted to provide wind breaks. Elm trees were planted to create avenues along pathways, which unknowingly created a pattern in resemblance to the Union Jack.

Hodgkinson described the landscaping design:

…the chief desiderata were shade along the numerous paths therein forming important lines of traffic, and such dense and continuous masses of foliage as would tend to check the inroad of dust from the adjacent streets. Consequently, in such reserves, strict adherence to the rules of landscape gardening, with regard to the grouping of trees, etc., had to be abandoned in favour of the formal lining of the paths with rows of umbrageous trees, and the planting in the background of dense masses of conifers, evergreen shrubs, fern trees, etc., small flowering shrubs and bedding flowers being merely introduced to mask the unsightly aspect of the grass in such reserves during summer.

During the 1880s and 1890s many of the blue gums were removed to create more room for existing trees, as well as sweeping lawns and ornamental flowerbeds. Sub-tropical planting became a feature of the Gardens with the creation of new planting in areas like the Mound and the Grey Street Walk. Further major changes occurred in the 1930s and 1940s with the establishment of the Conservatory and the arrival of Cooks' Cottage in the Gardens.

In 2014 an area previously used for depot activities was reclaimed as garden space and features a major stormwater harvesting system, a café and visitor centre which provides tourism information about Melbourne as well as specific information and services for Cooks' Cottage and Fitzroy Gardens.

=== Scarred tree ===
A scarred tree in the gardens has been preserved. The plaque at the bottom of the tree reads:

The scar on this tree was created when Aboriginal people removed bark to make canoes, shields, food and water containers, string, baby carriers and other items.

Please respect this site. It is important to the Wurundjeri people as traditional custodians of the land and is part of the heritage of all Australians.

All Aboriginal cultural sites are protected by law.

== Wildlife ==
The gardens are home to brushtail and ringtail possums, rainbow lorikeets, ducks and microbats (small insect eating bats). They are visited at night by grey-headed flying foxes (a large nectar and fruit eating bat) and powerful owls. The presence of Australian wildlife make the city gardens especially enjoyable for overseas visitors and locals alike.

== History ==
In 1848 the Fitzroy Gardens were permanently reserved as public gardens, with title shared by the colonial government and the City of Melbourne. The gardens were known as Fitzroy Square until 1862, named after Sir Charles Augustus FitzRoy, a governor of New South Wales. James Sinclair was appointed head gardener in 1857 and worked in the gardens until his death in 1881. During that time, responsibility for the Gardens was assumed by the Lands Department and Clement Hodgkinson began the planning and development of the city parks, including Fitzroy Gardens, from 1860. Over the next fifteen years, a network of paths were established and the band pavilion, Sinclair's Cottage, a small Tudor-style lodge for the gate keepers, and the Neo-classical rotunda were all completed.

Various other facilities including the plant nursery and stable yard were relocated within the gardens, a timber kiosk opened, and an external picket fence was replaced by stone edging in 1915. Two years later, administration of the gardens was transferred to the City of Melbourne who constructed a manger's house and, in 1930, opened the Conservatory.

In 1934, the Grimwade family funded the relocation of Cooks' Cottage from England to Australia, installed with the Gardens; and the erected after being bought, shipped to Australia, and Ola Cohn, an artist, completed carving the Fairies Tree and donated it to the children of Melbourne. During the 1940s, after years of confusion, Grey Street West was renamed Cathedral Place, and a model Tudor village was built by Edgar Wilson.

In 1960, the kiosk was damaged by fire and reopened four years later. Further plantings and irrigation works were completed during the 1960s and 1970s.

== Gallery ==
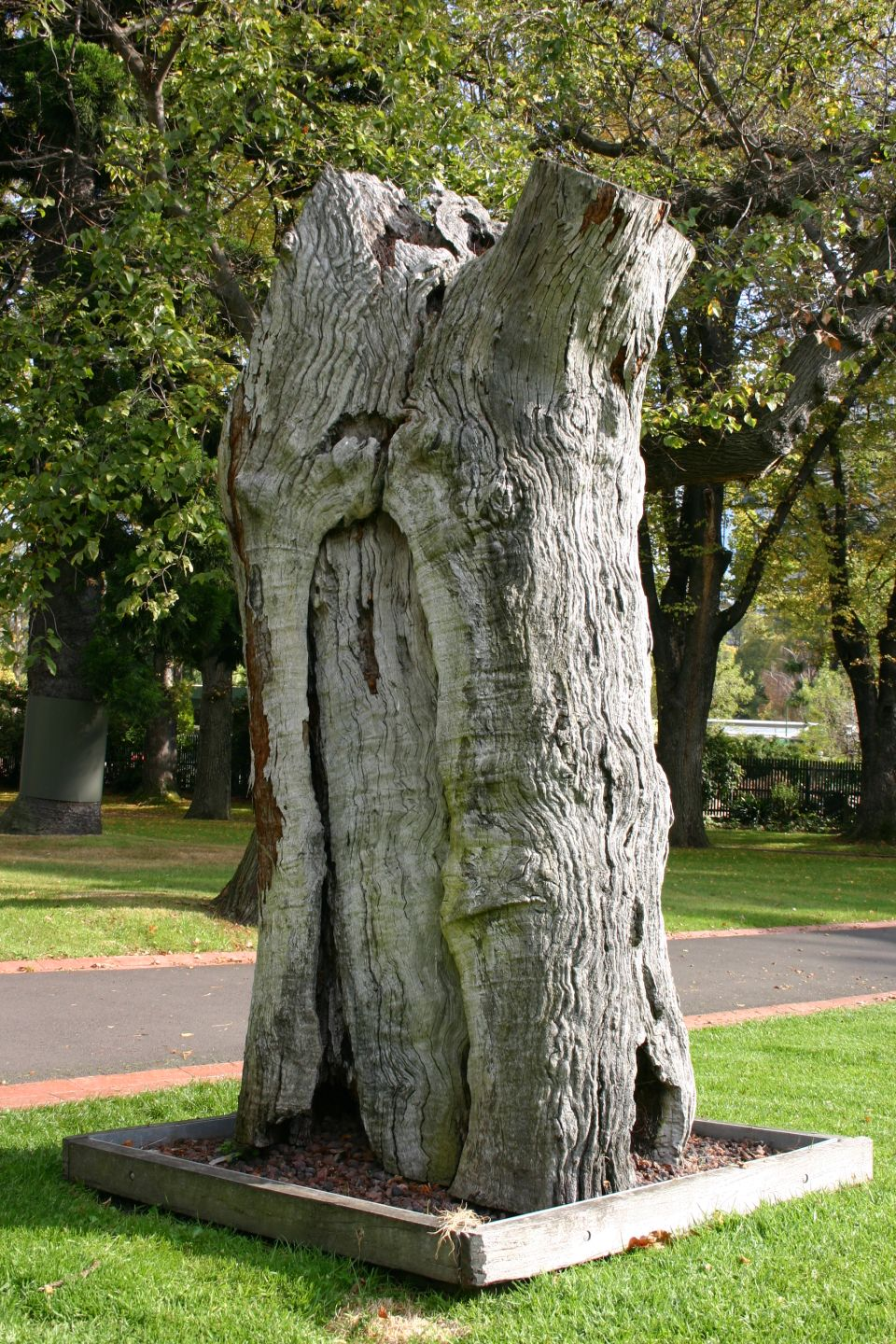
Scarred Tree - a sign of the original habitation of Melbourne by the Wurundjeri people

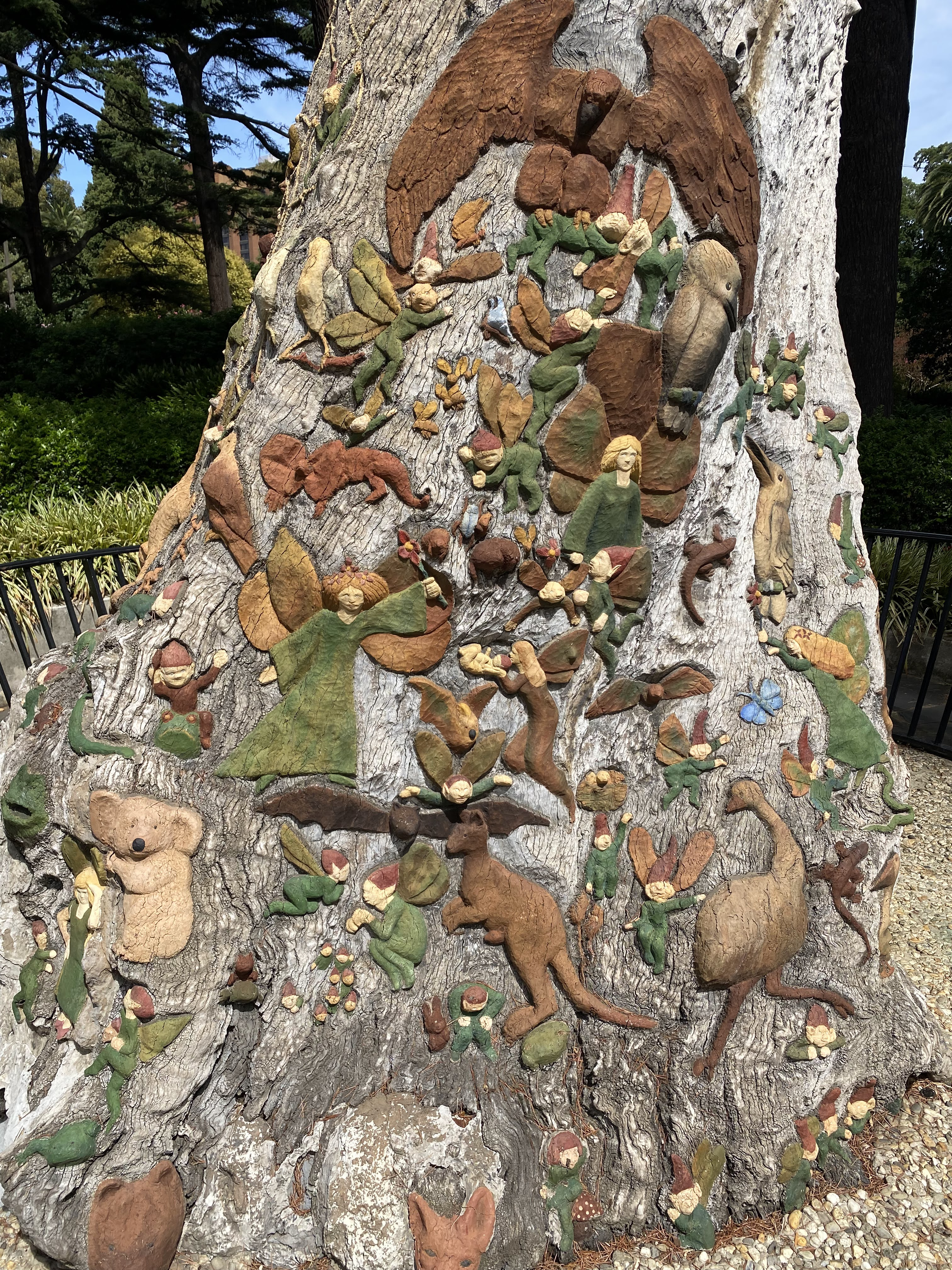
Fairies Tree in the Fitzroy Gardens

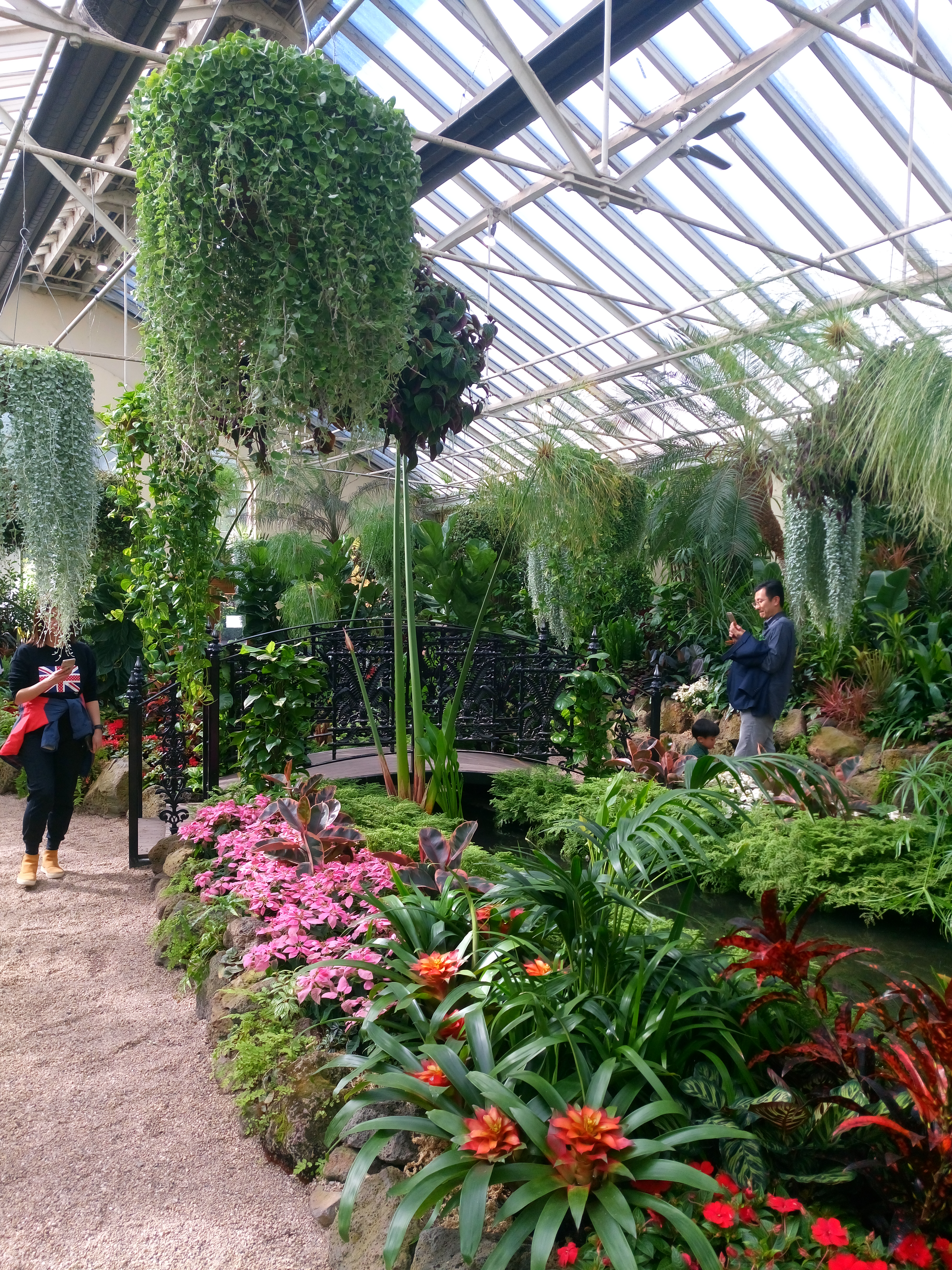
Fitzroy Gardens conservatory (Interior)

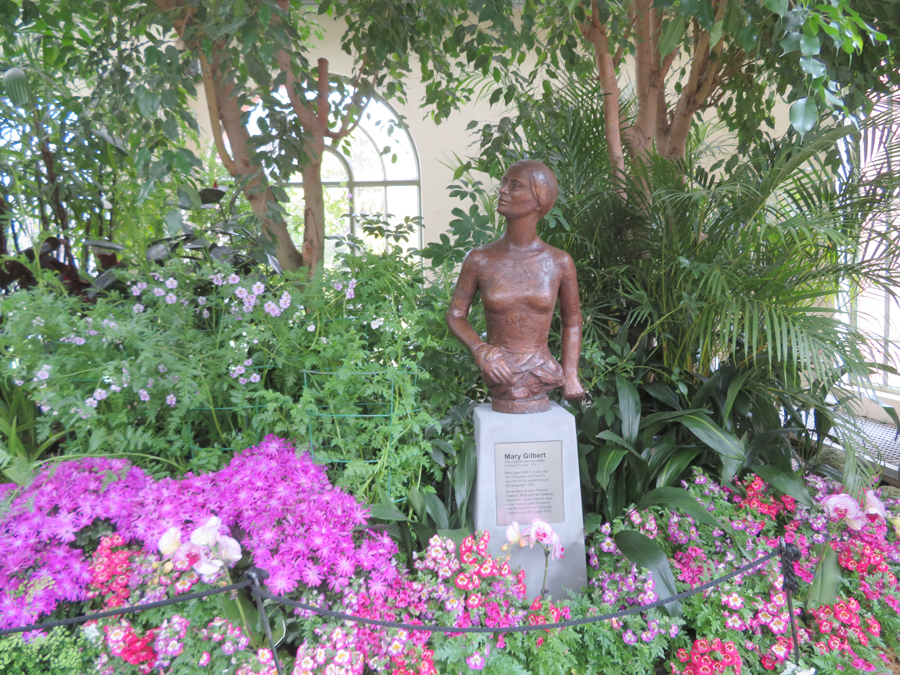
Mary Gilbert, 1st pioneer woman, sculpture 1974 by Ailsa O'Connor

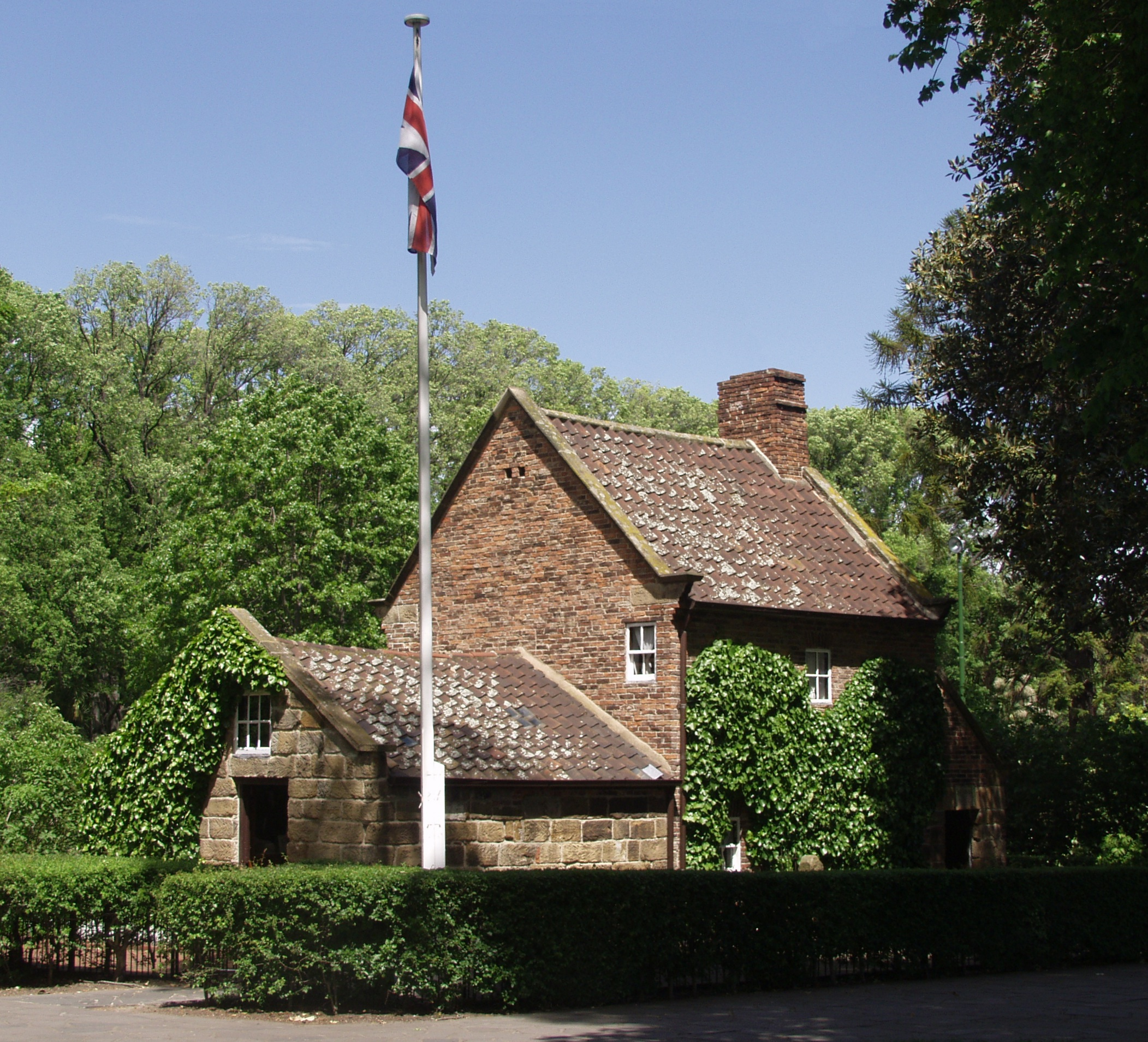
Cooks' Cottage in the Fitzroy Gardens

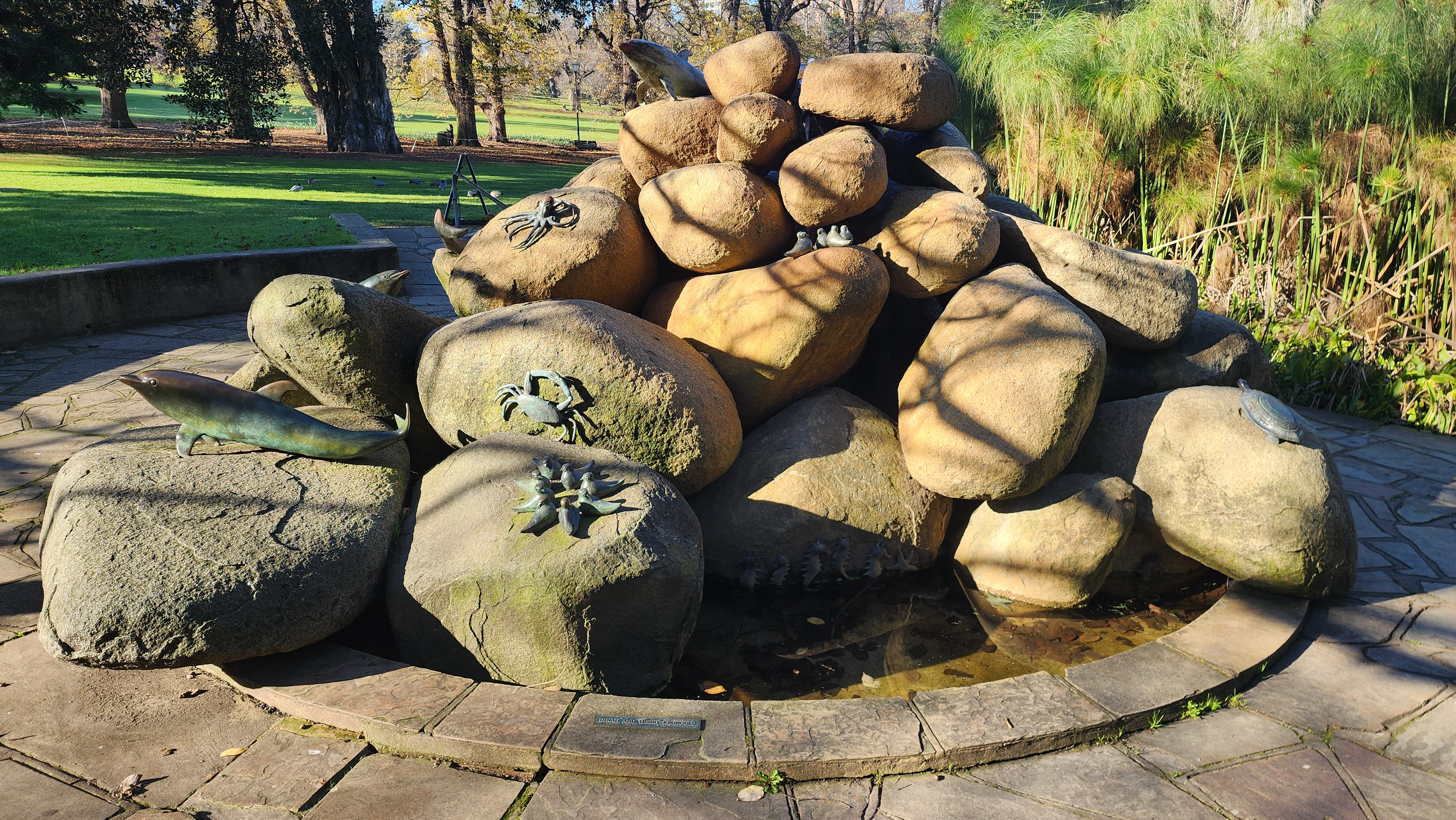
Dolphin Fountain by June Arnold

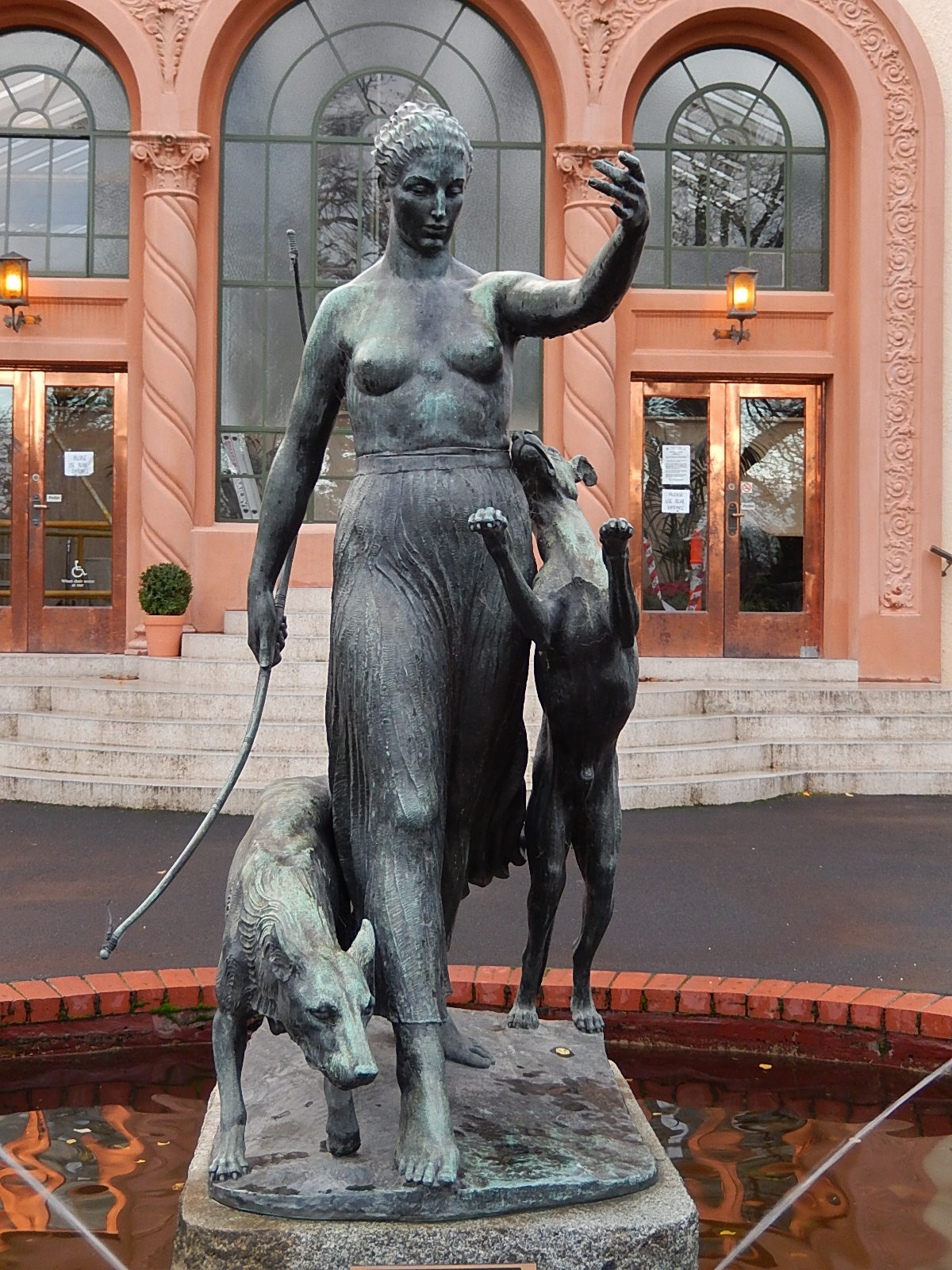
Diana and the Hounds by Leslie Bowles

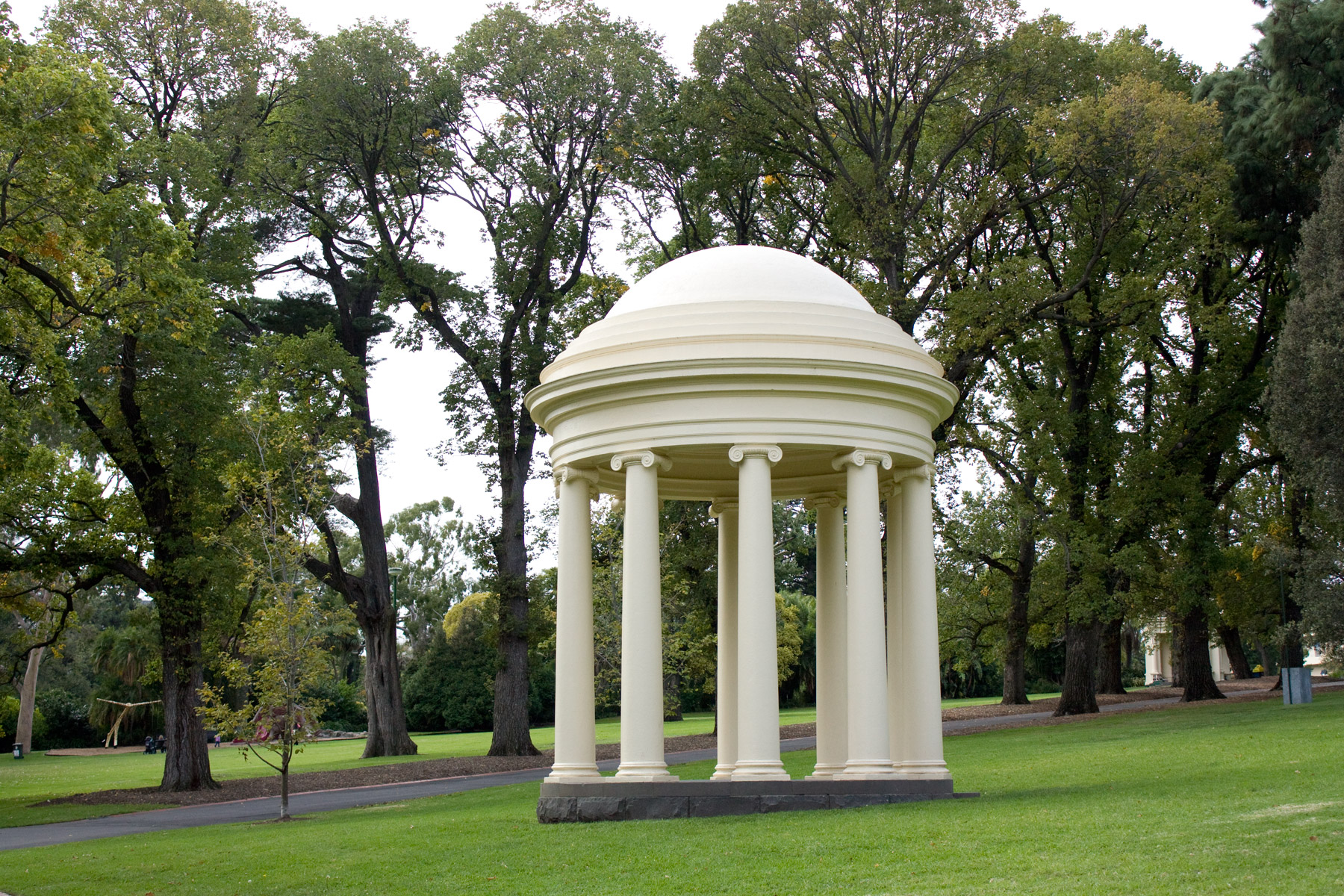
Temple of the Winds by Thomas Julian & Co.

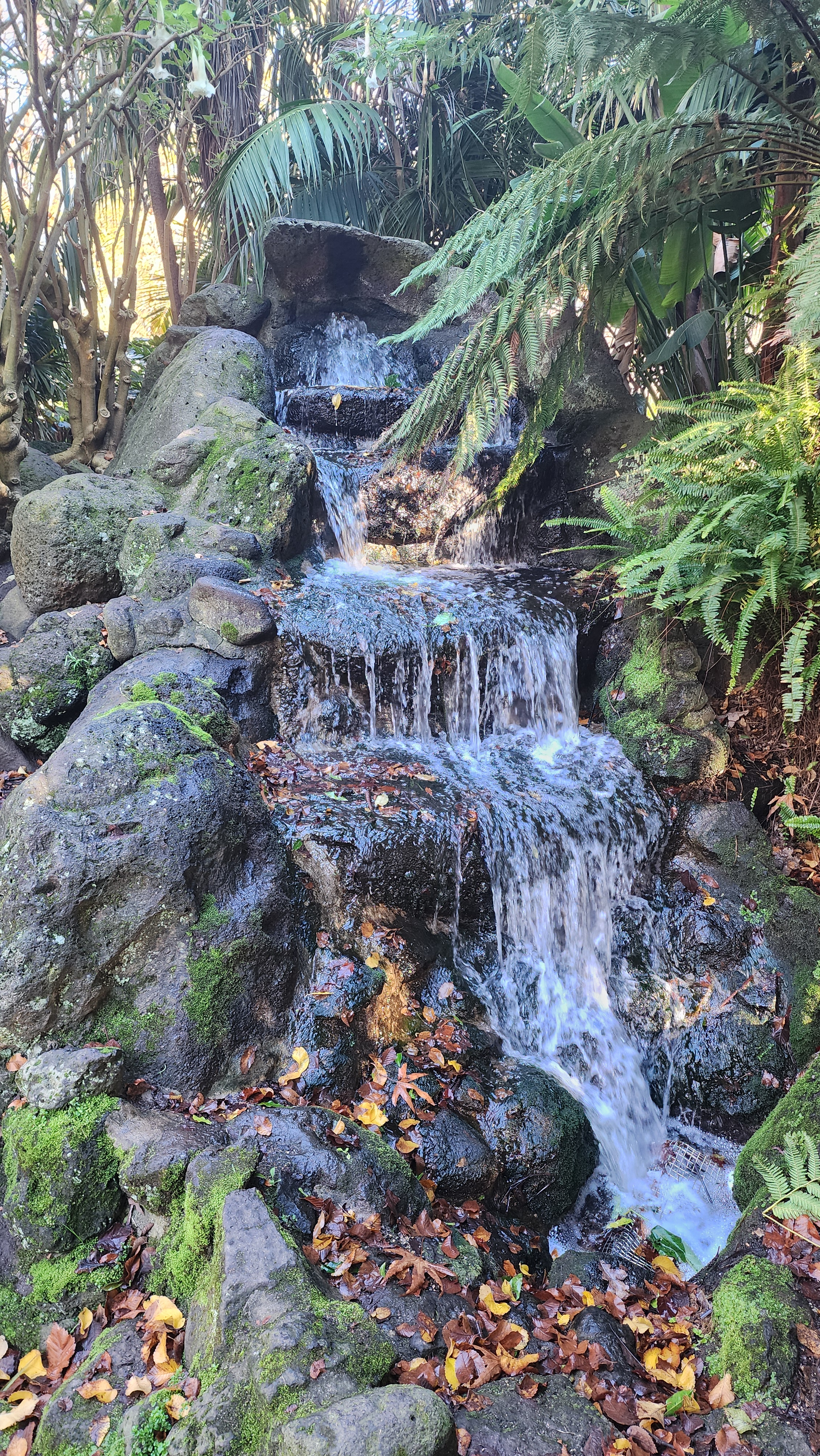
Waterfall

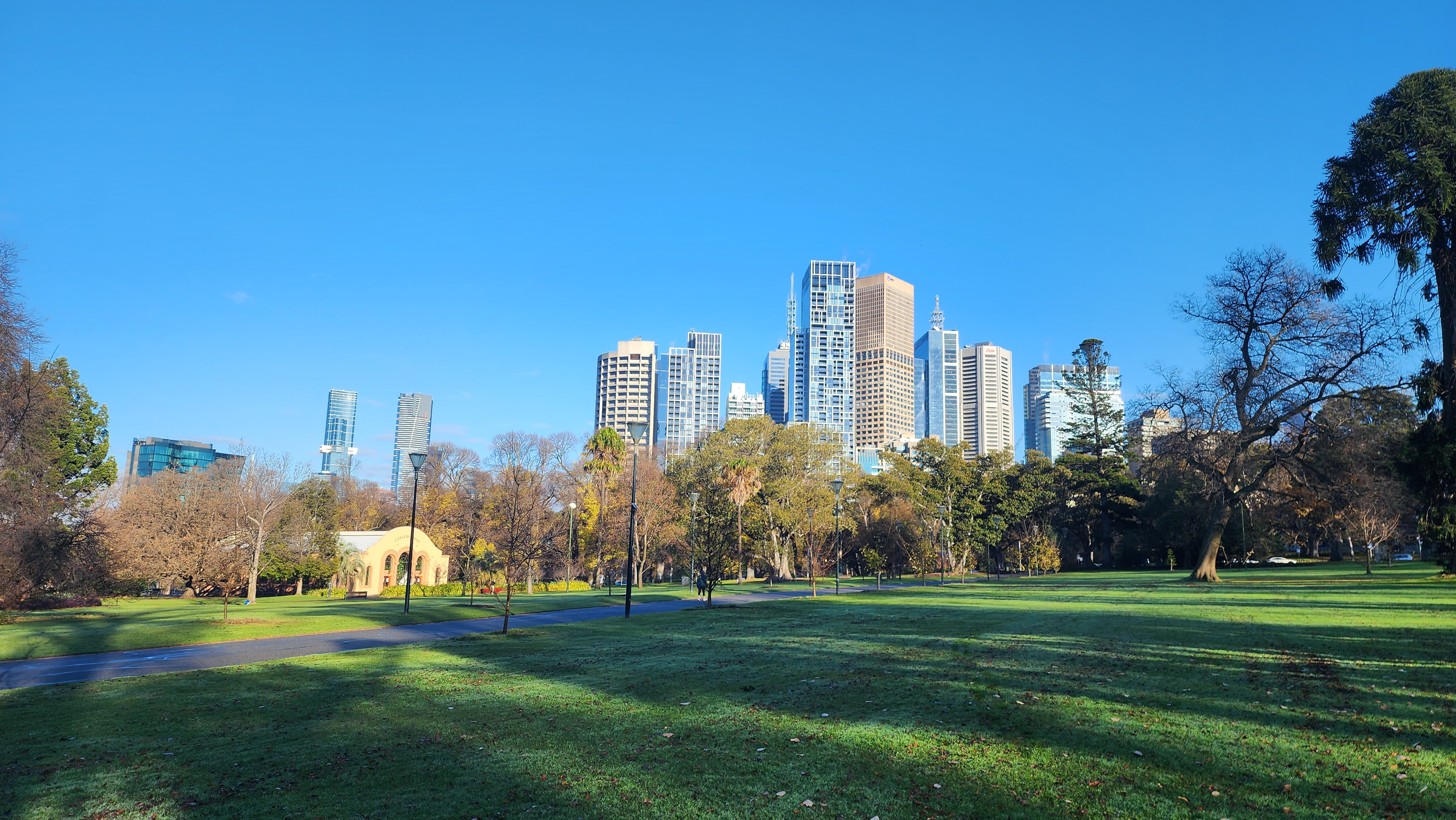
Melbourne skyline view from Fitzroy Gardens

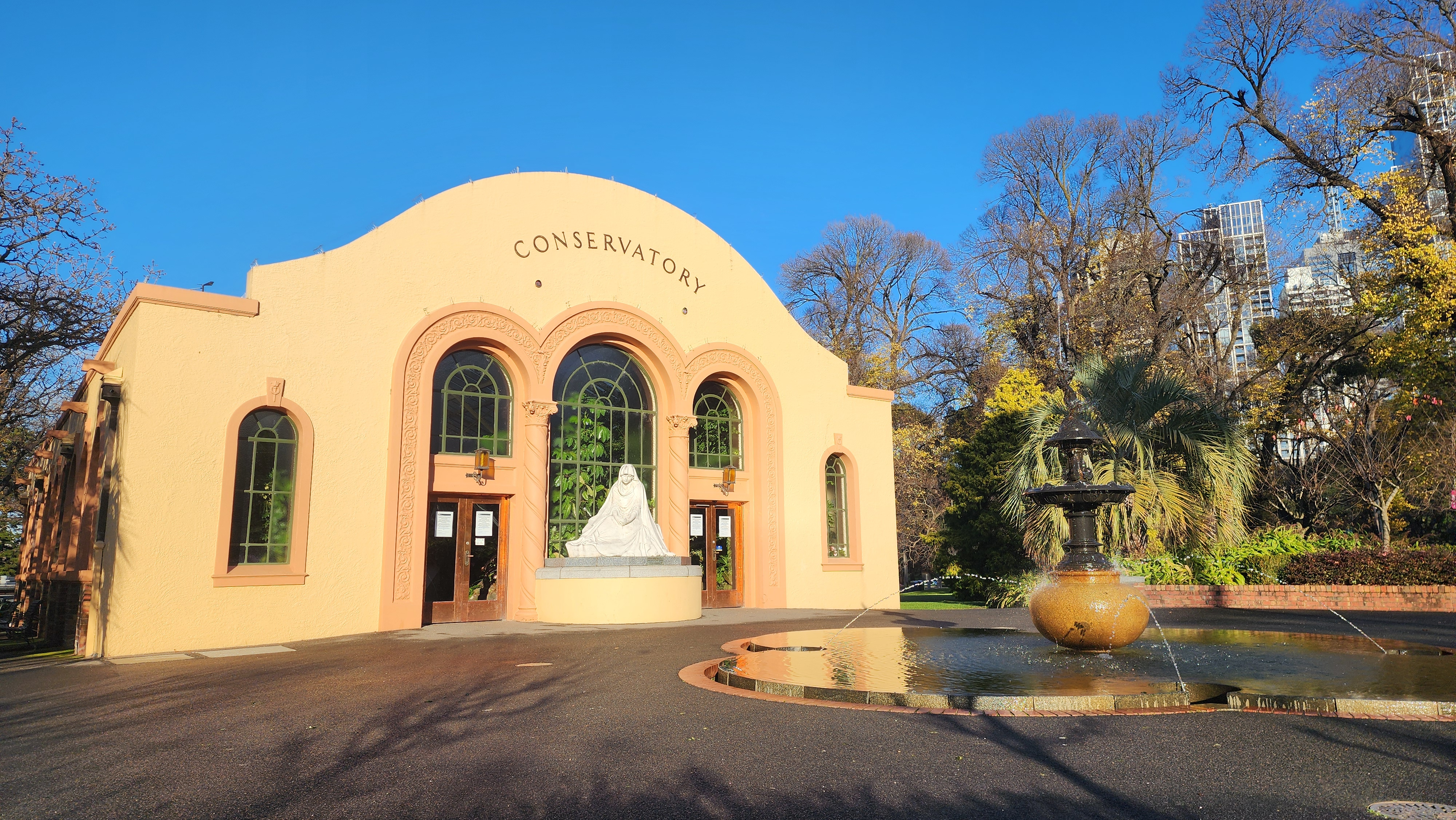
Norther exterior of the conservatory with Boy with Serpent or Ornamental Fountain

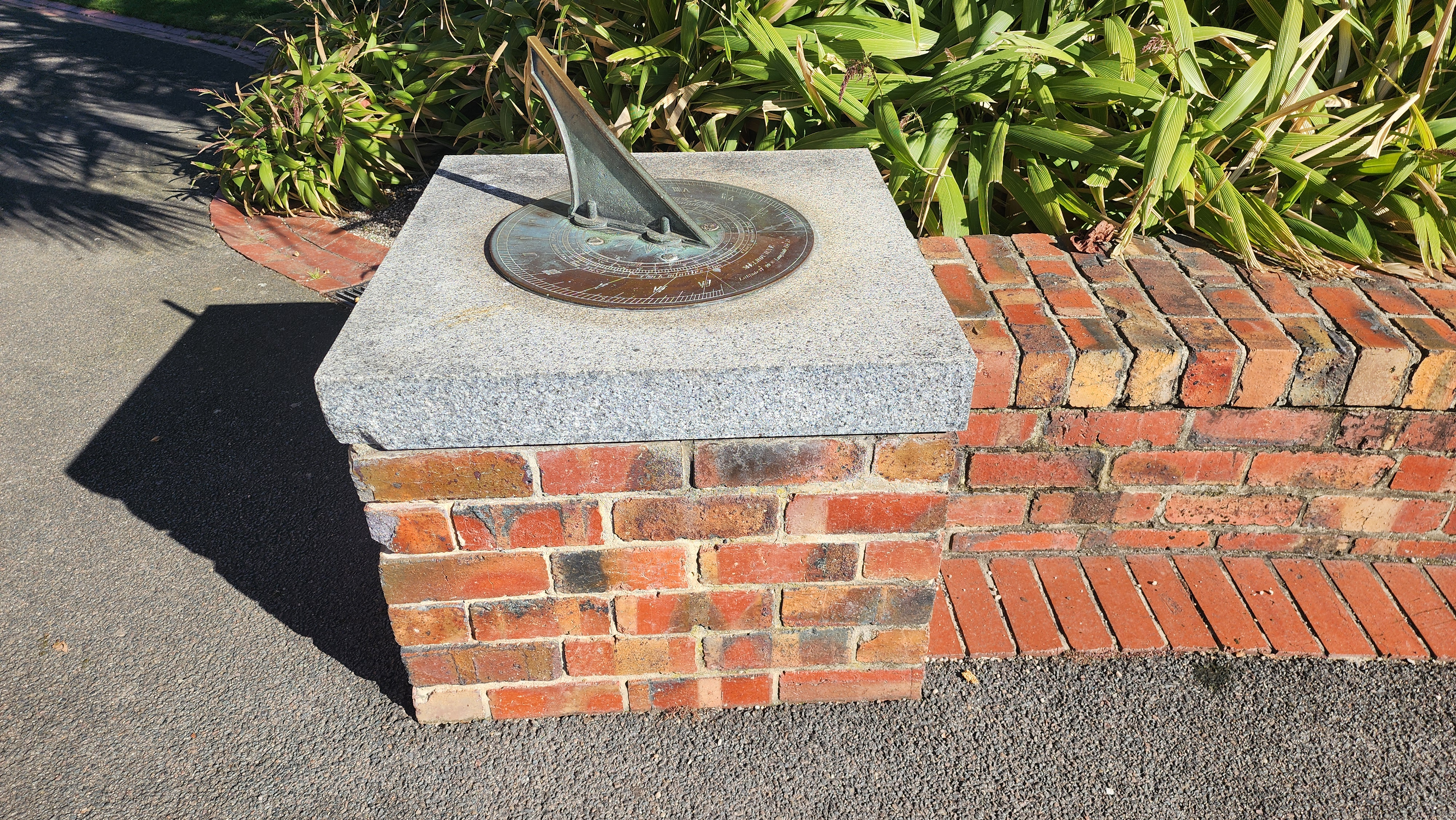
Sundial at the Northern exterior of the conservatory

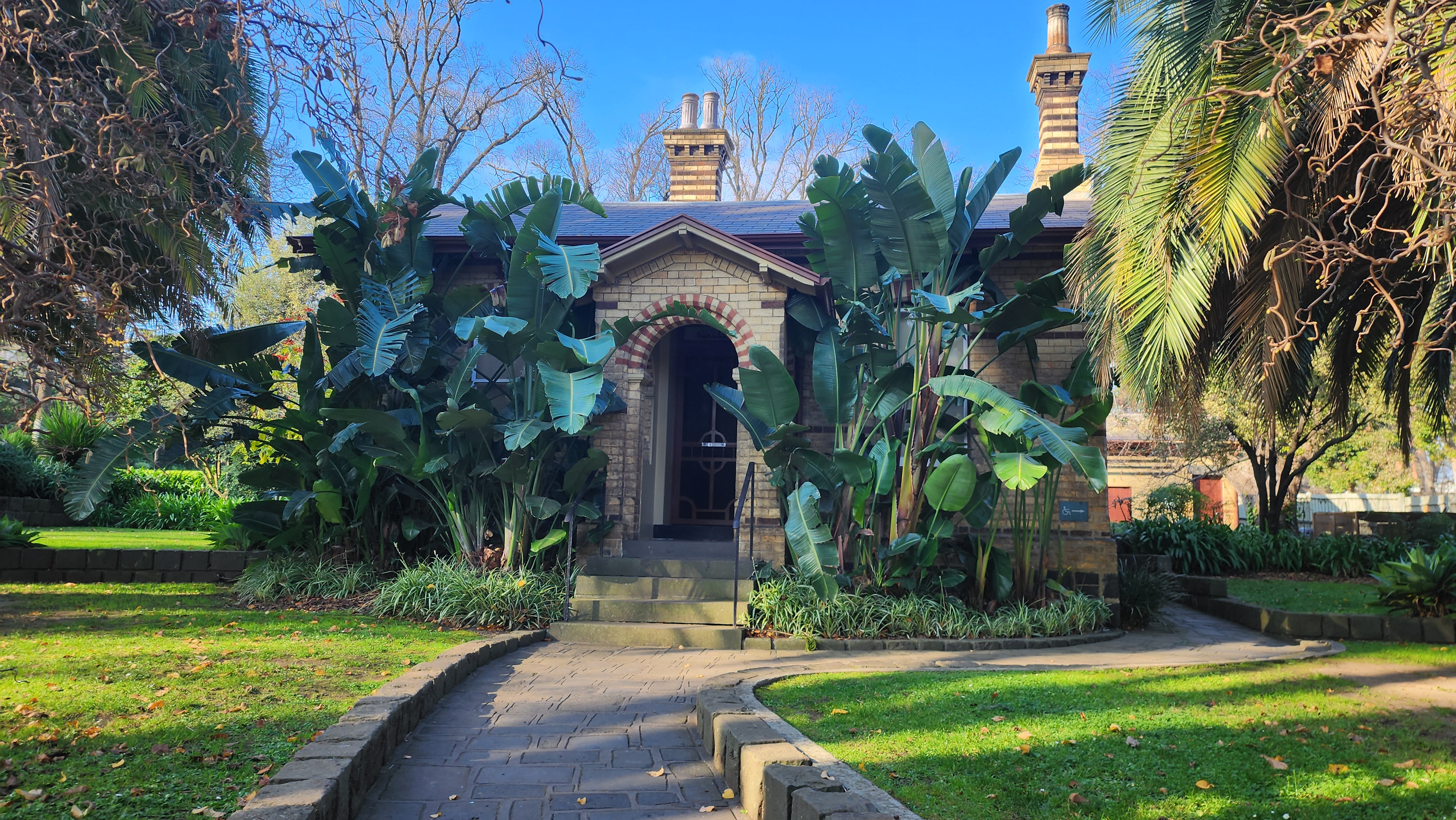
Sinclair's Cottage's front gate

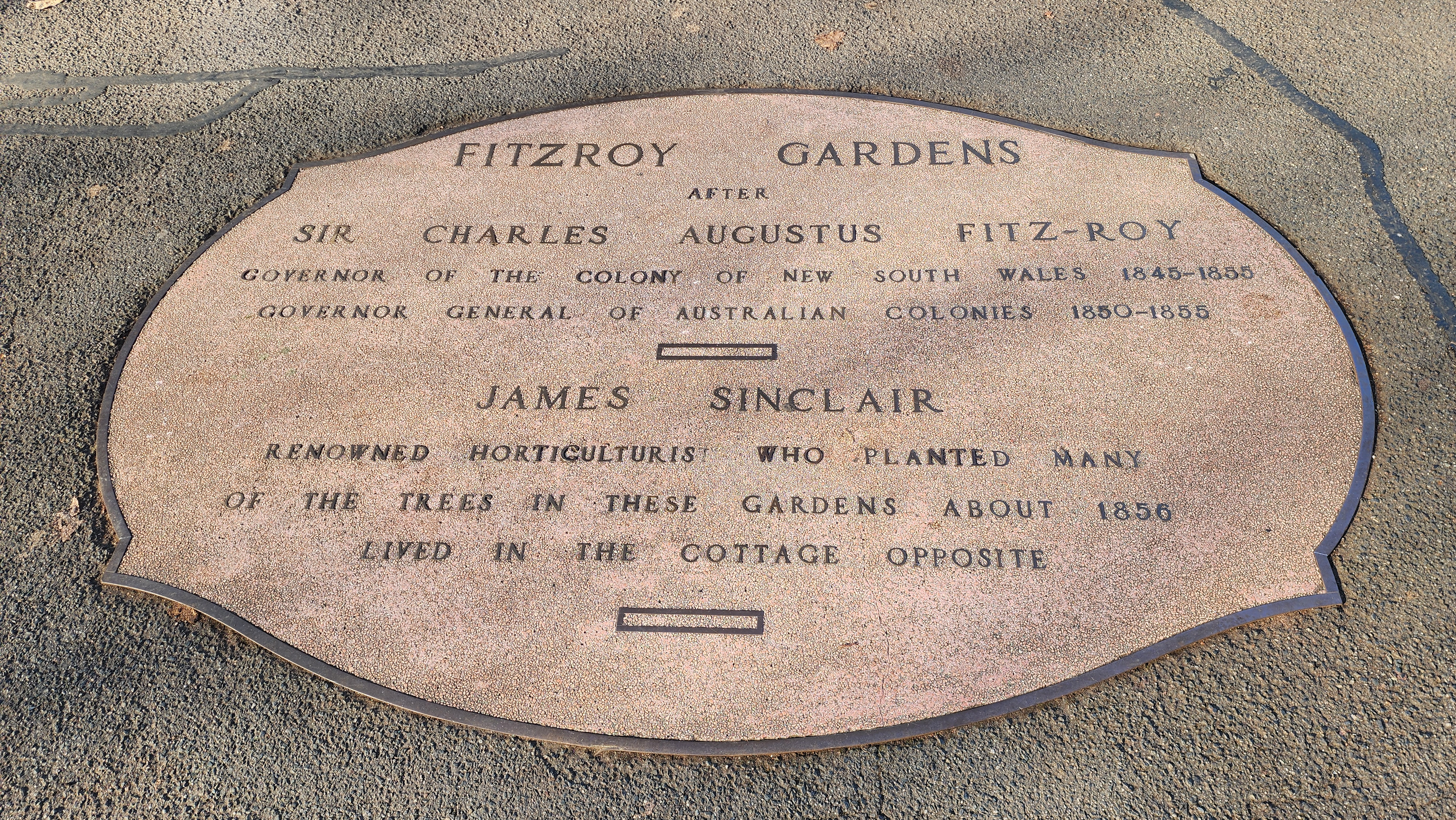
James Sinclair and Charles Augustus FitzRoy's plate out front of Sinclair's Cottage

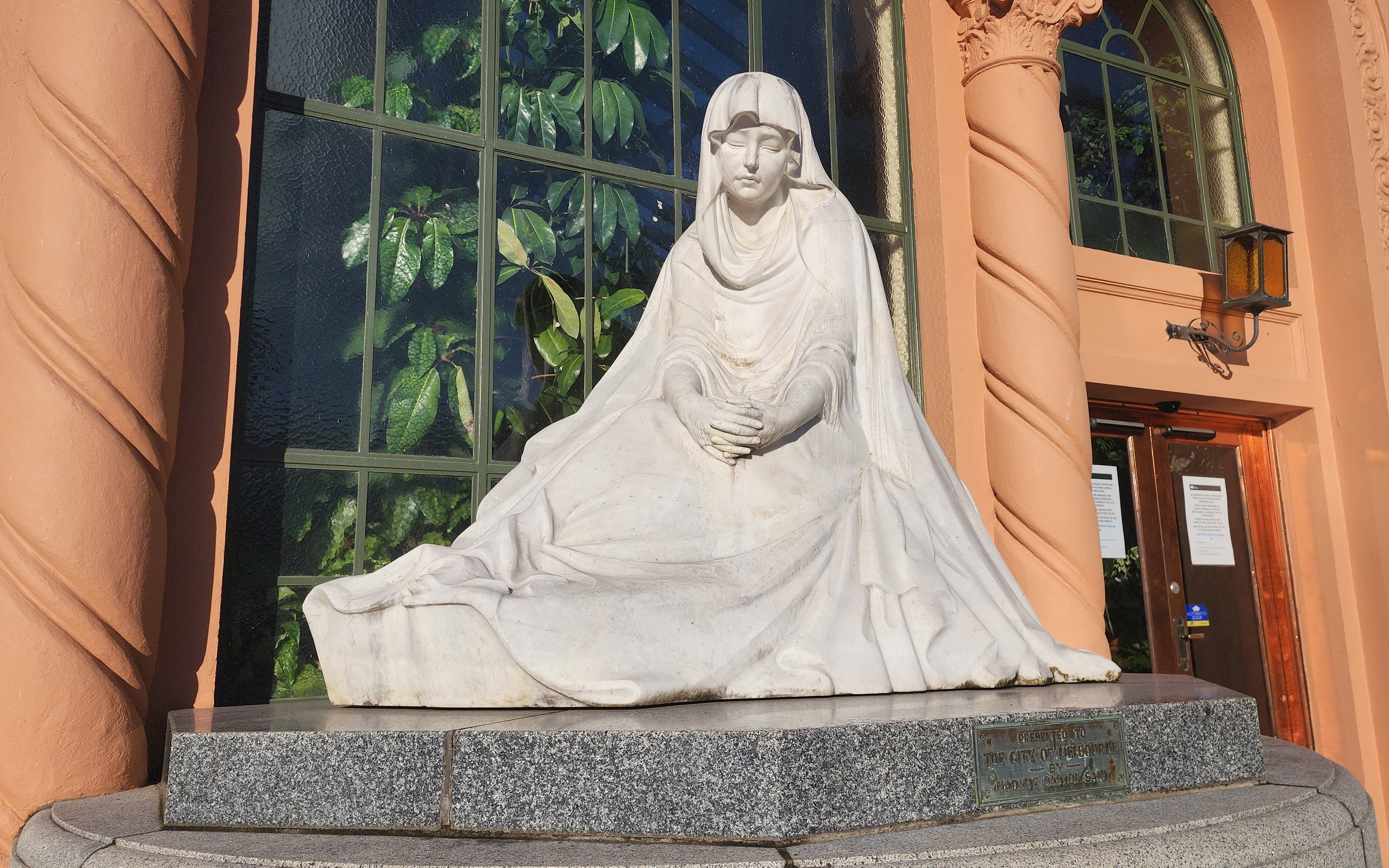
Statue of Meditation by Robert Delandre at the northern side of the conservatory

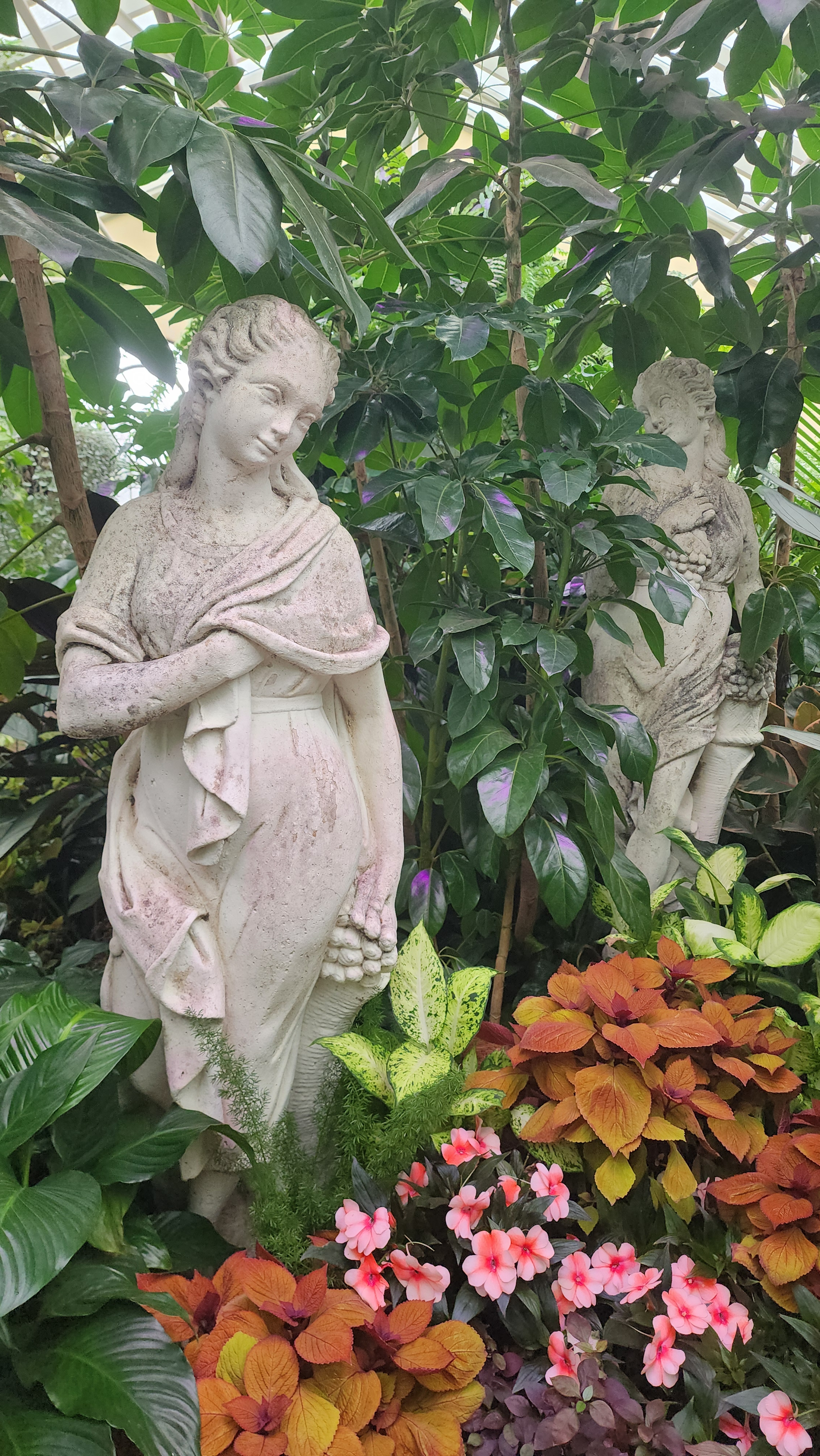
Nymph statues in the conservatory

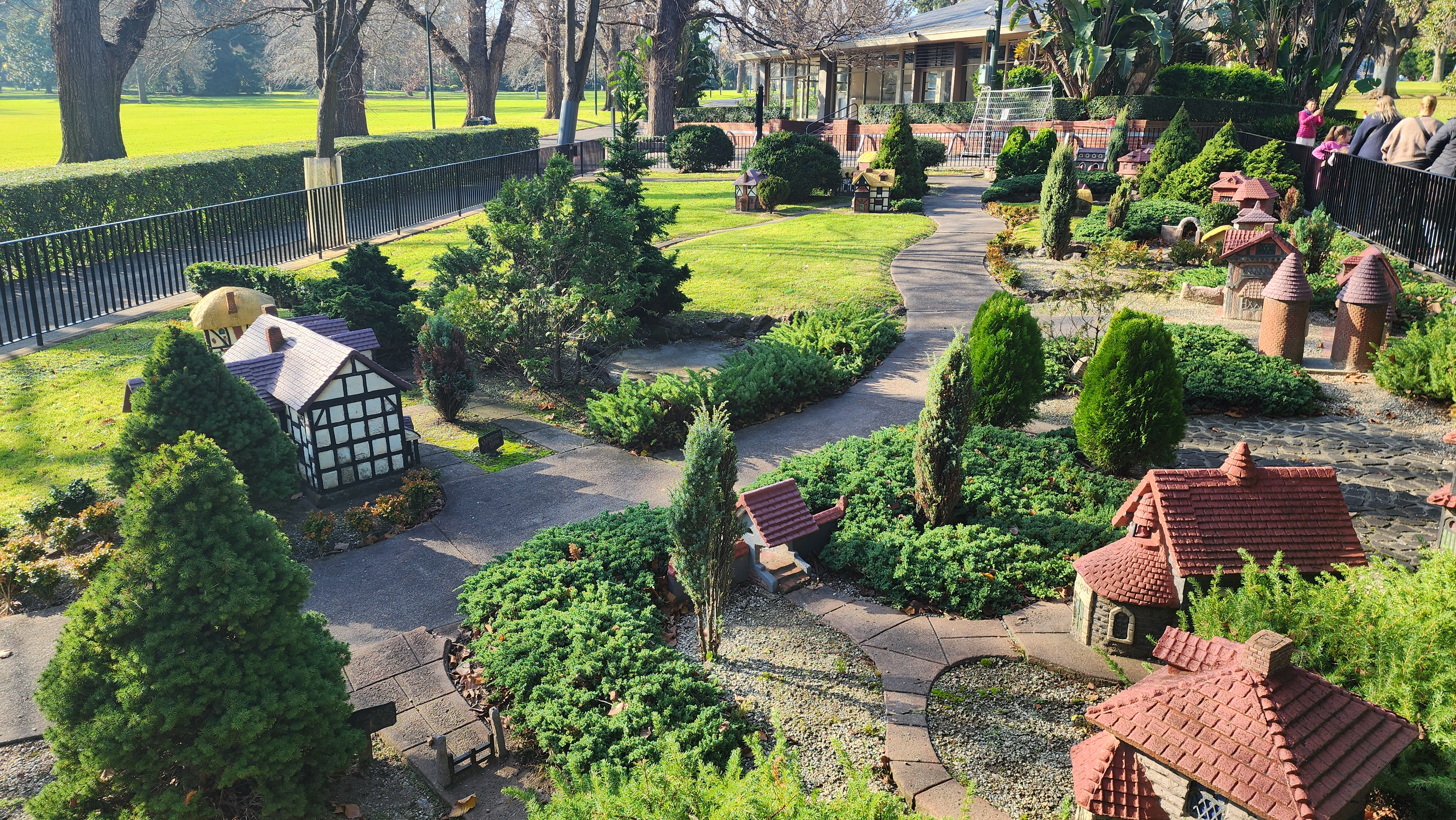
Model Tudor Village built by Edgar Wilson

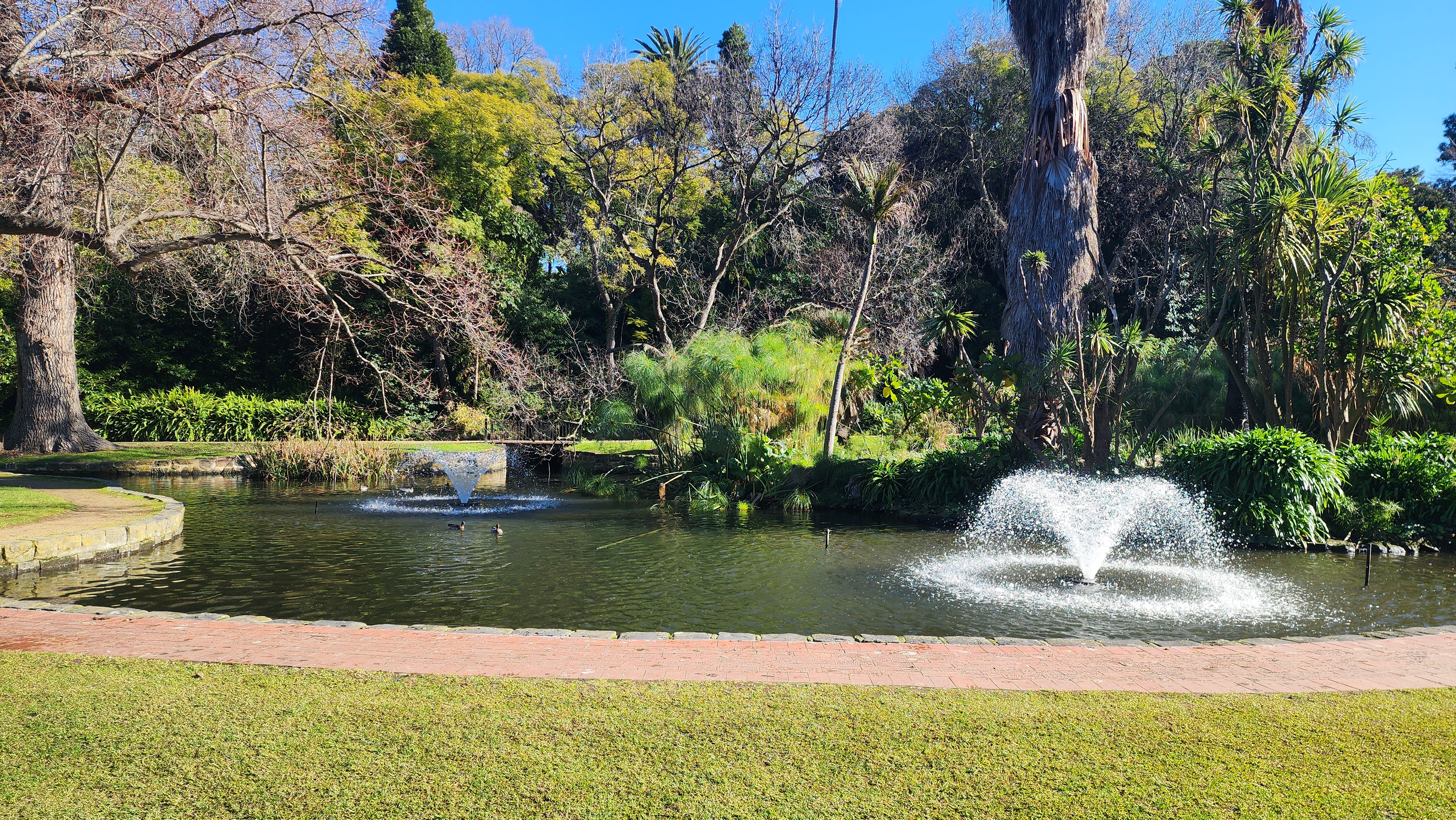
The Mound and Pond

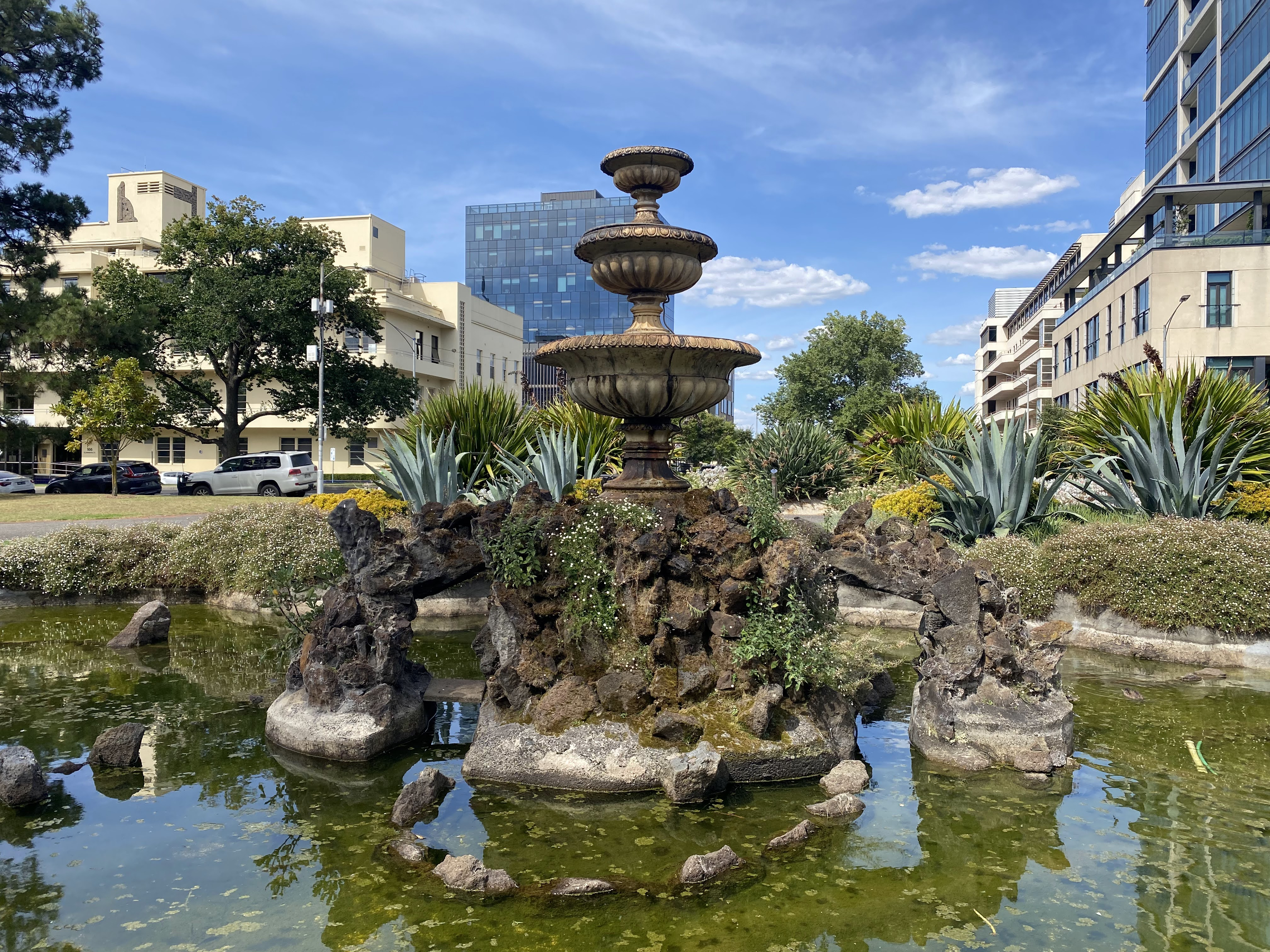
Grey Street Fountain

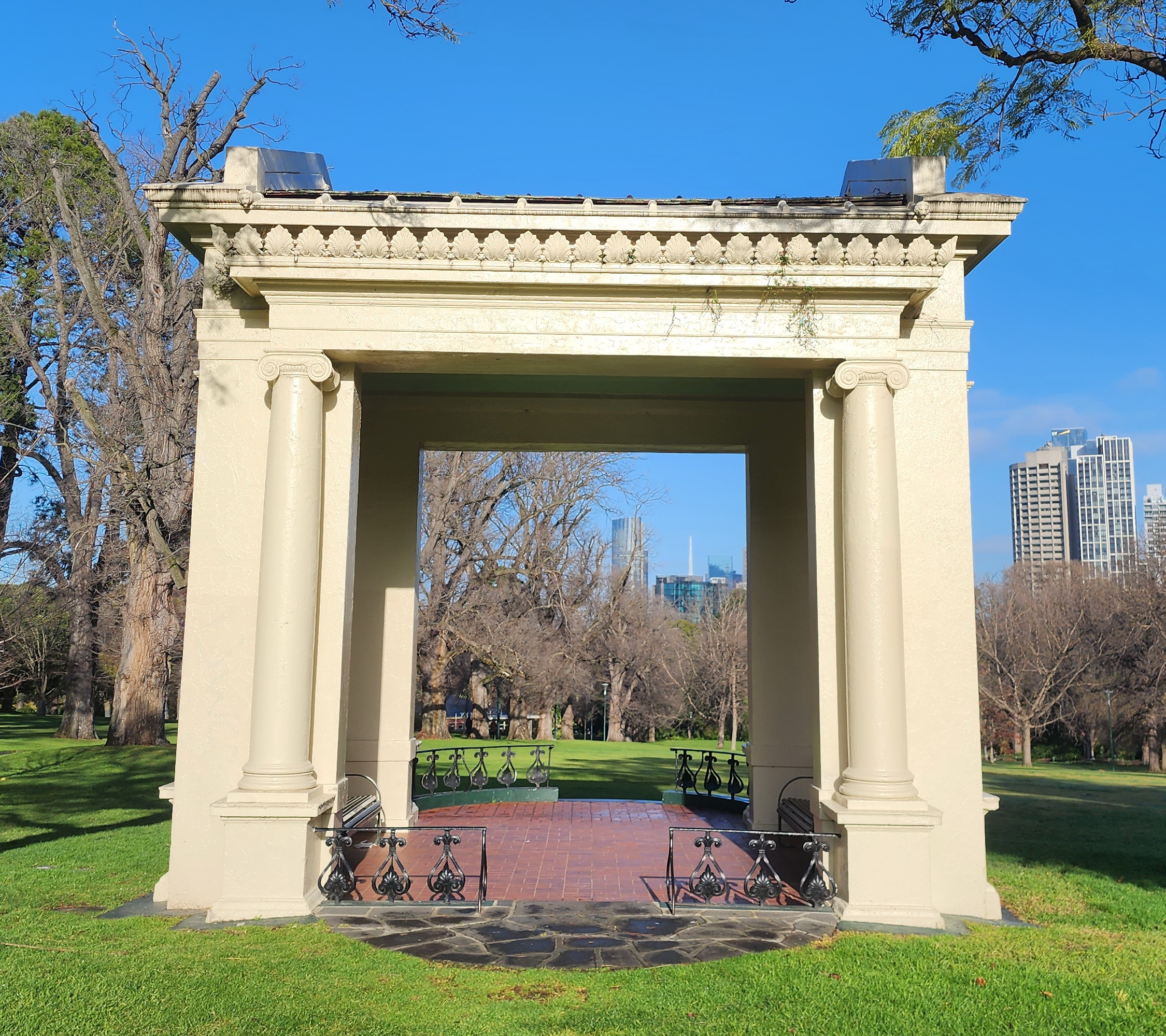
Bandstand

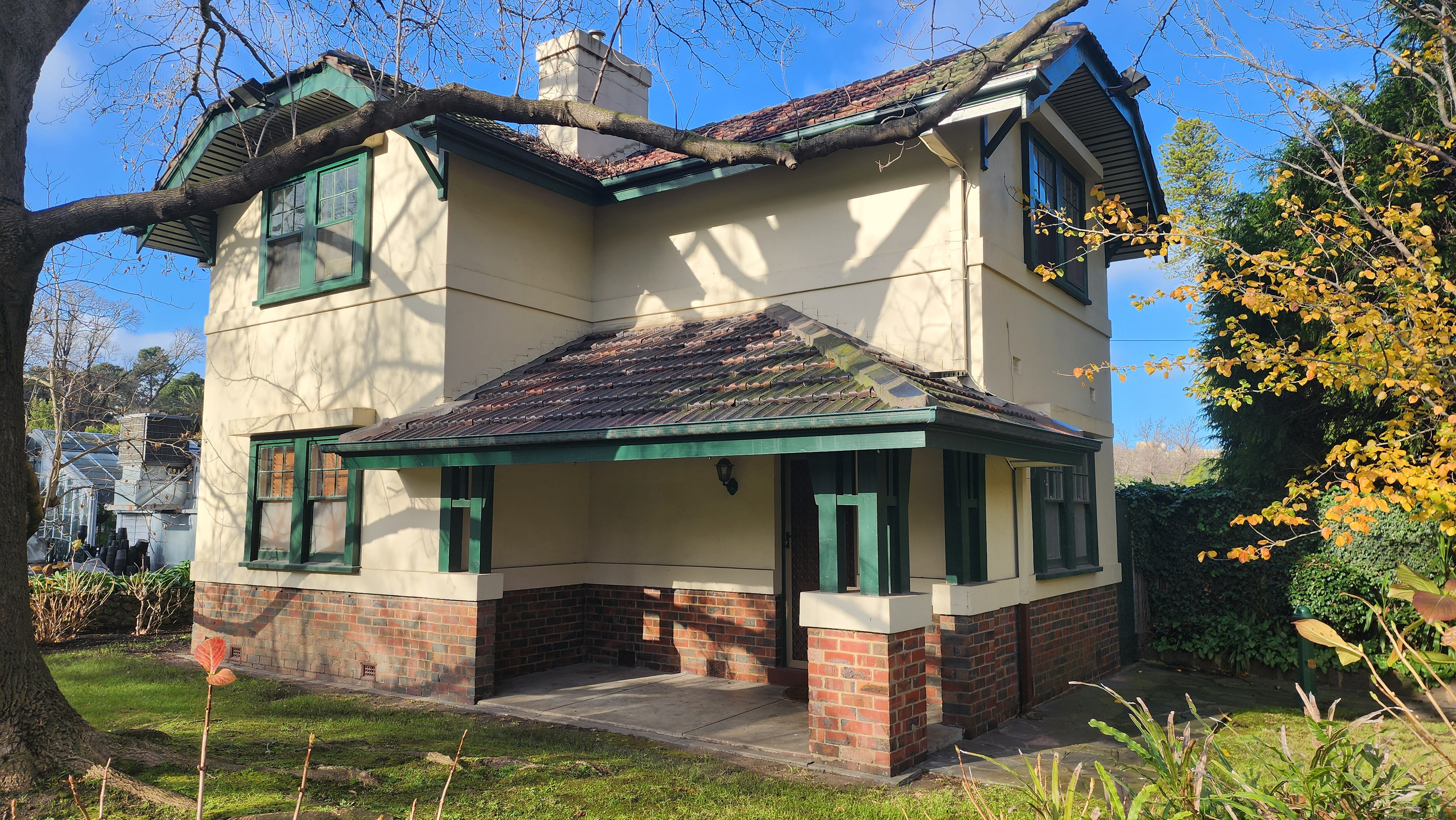
Plants' Nursery

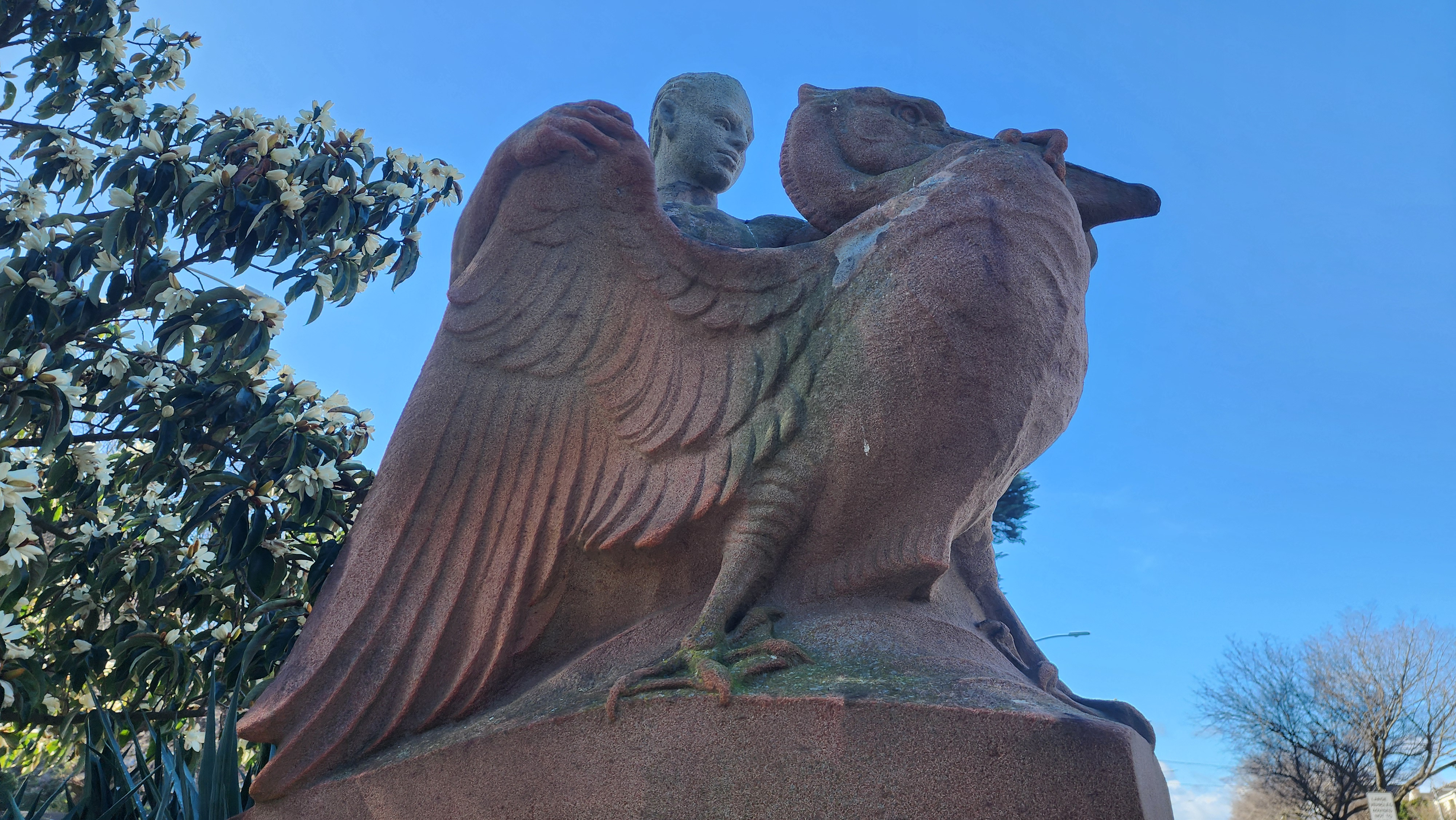
Boy and Pelican by William Leslie Bowles

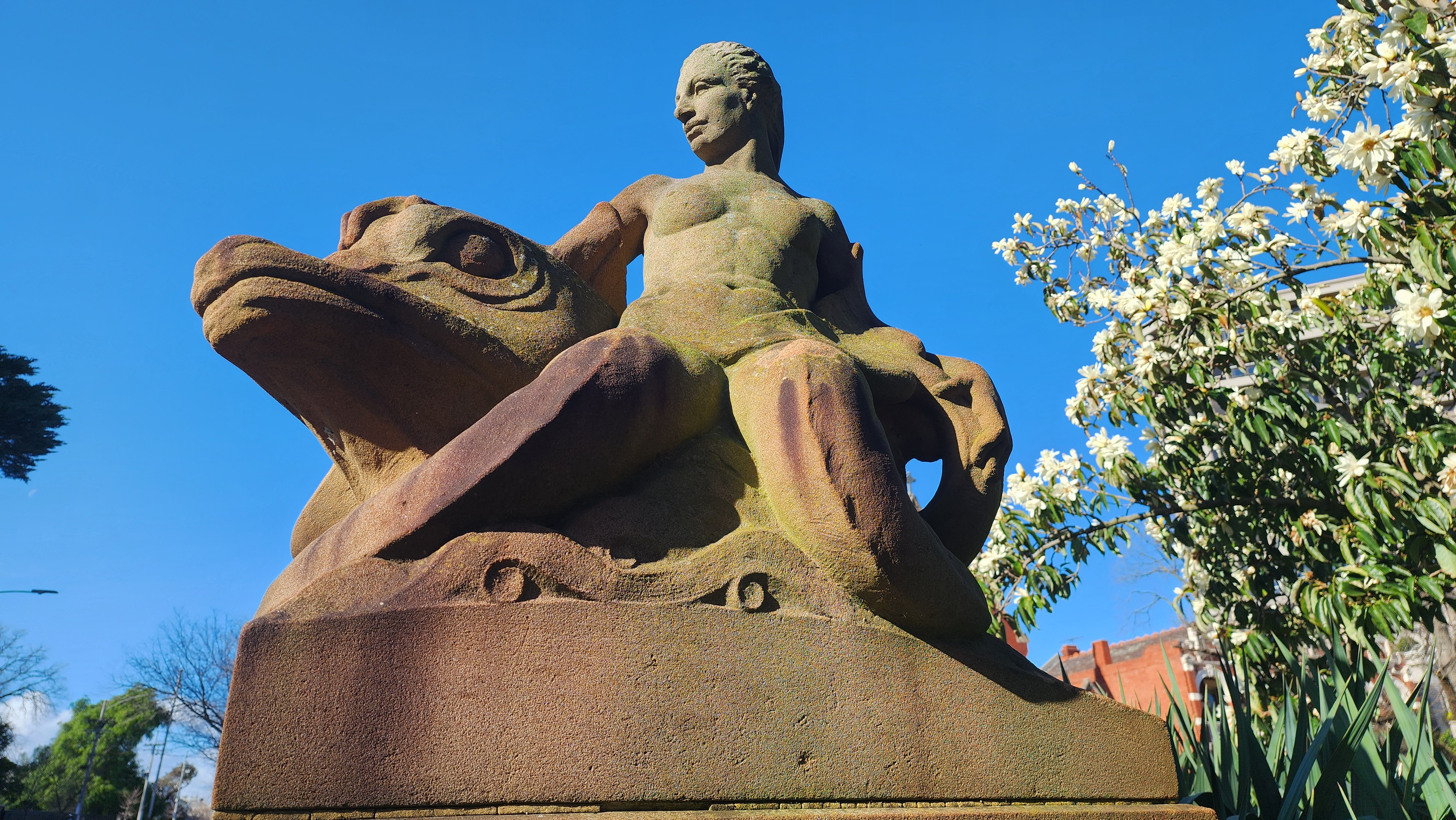
Mermaid and Fish by William Leslie Bowles

== See also ==
- Parks and gardens of Melbourne
- Heritage gardens in Australia
- List of heritage-listed buildings in Melbourne
