= List of companies of Madagascar =

Location of Madagascar

Madagascar is an island country in the Indian Ocean, off the coast of Southeast Africa. Madagascar belongs to the group of least developed countries, according to the United Nations. Ecotourism and agriculture, paired with greater investments in education, health, and private enterprise, are key elements of Madagascar's development strategy. Under Marc Ravalomanana, these investments produced substantial economic growth, but the benefits were not evenly spread throughout the population, producing tensions over the increasing cost of living and declining living standards among the poor and some segments of the middle class. As of 2017, the economy has been weakened by the 2009-2013 political crisis, and quality of life remains low for the majority of the Malagasy population.

== Notable firms ==
This list includes notable companies with primary headquarters located in the country. The industry and sector follow the Industry Classification Benchmark taxonomy. Organizations which have ceased operations are included and noted as defunct.

Notable companies Status: P=Private, S=State; A=Active, D=Defunct
Name	Industry	Sector	Headquarters	Founded	Notes	Status	
Air Madagascar	Consumer services	Airlines	Antananarivo	1962		S	A
Ambatovy mine	Mining	Mine	Moramanga	2004	Nickel & cobalt mine	P	A
Central Bank of Madagascar	Financials	Banks	Antananarivo	1974	Central bank	S	A
Chocolaterie Robert	Chocolate products	Chocolate	Antananarivo	1940		P	A
Jirama	Utilities	Electricity & water	Antananarivo	1975	Electricity production and water distribution	S	A
Karenjy	Consumer goods	Automobiles	Fianarantsoa	1985	Automotive	P	A
Madagascar Flying Services	Consumer services	Airlines	Antananarivo	2002	Airline, defunct 2006	P	D
Madarail	Industrials	Railroads	Antananarivo	1999	Railway	P	A
MCB Madagascar	Financials	Banks	Antananarivo	1992	Bank	P	A
Paositra Malagasy	Postal services		Antananarivo			S	A
Tiko Air	Consumer services	Airlines	Antananarivo	2000	Charter airline	P	A
Tsaradia	Consumer services	Regional airline	Antananarivo	2018		S	A
Vakoka Vakiteny	Consumer services	Publishing	Toliara	2007	Publisher	P	A

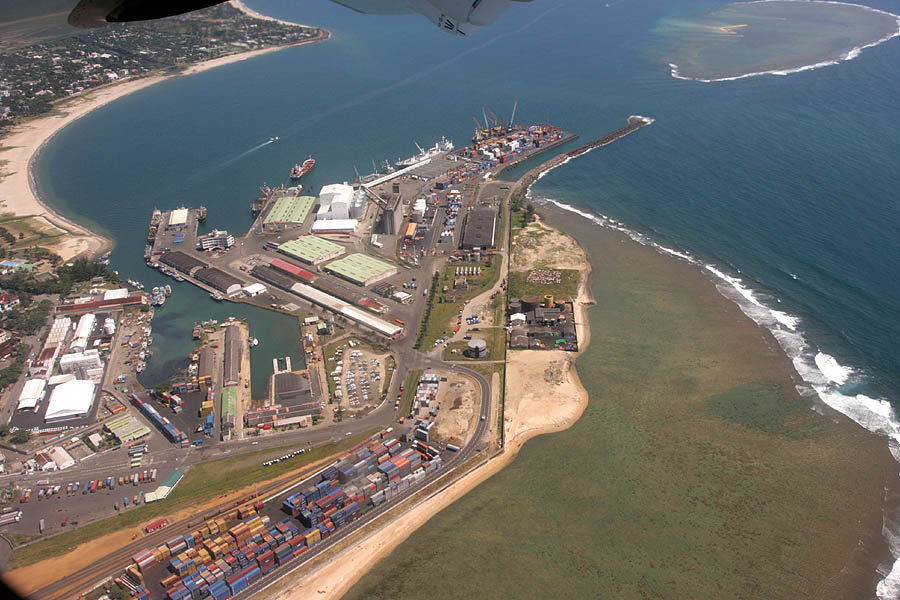
Port Toamasina

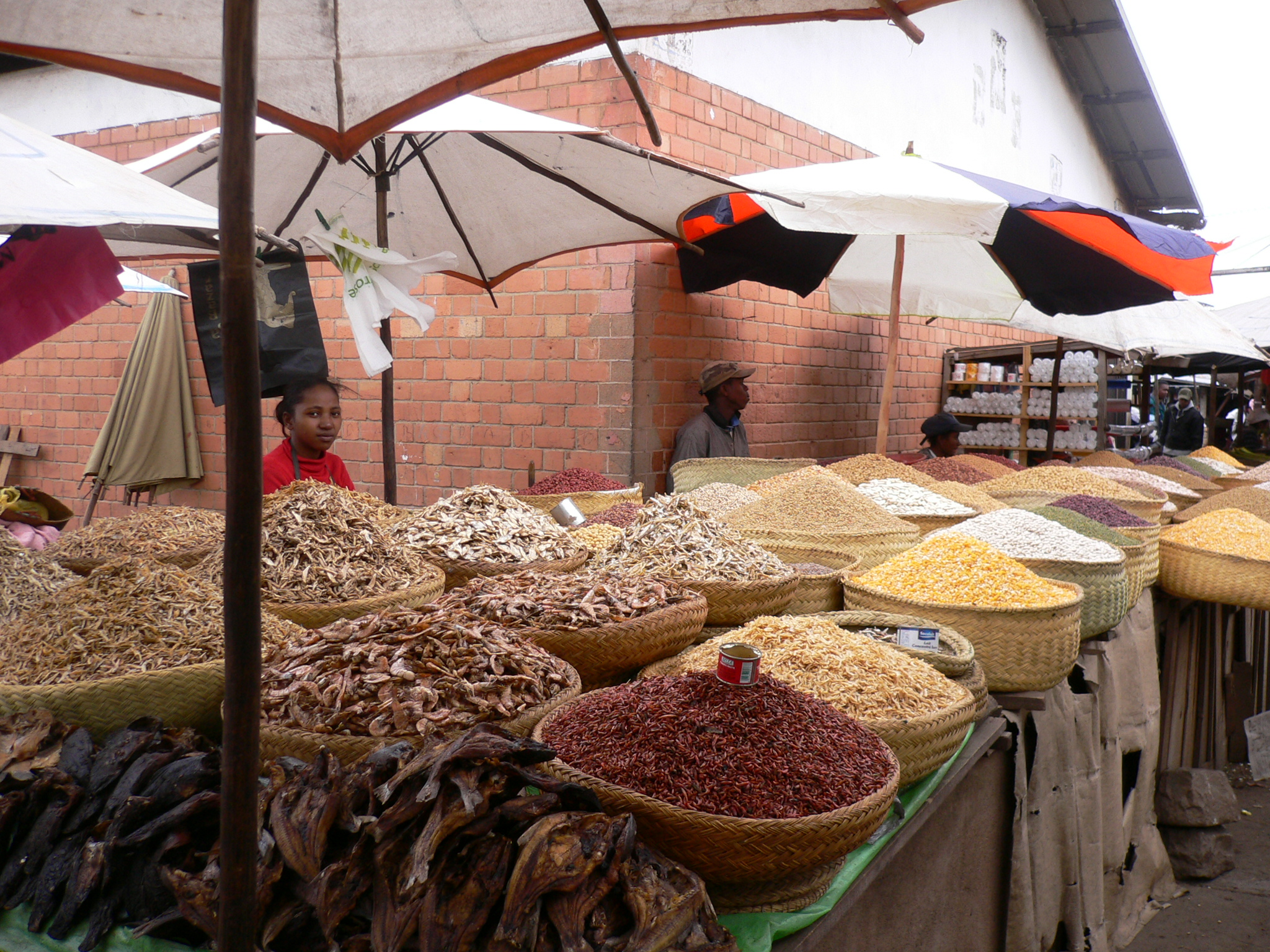
Local market vendors

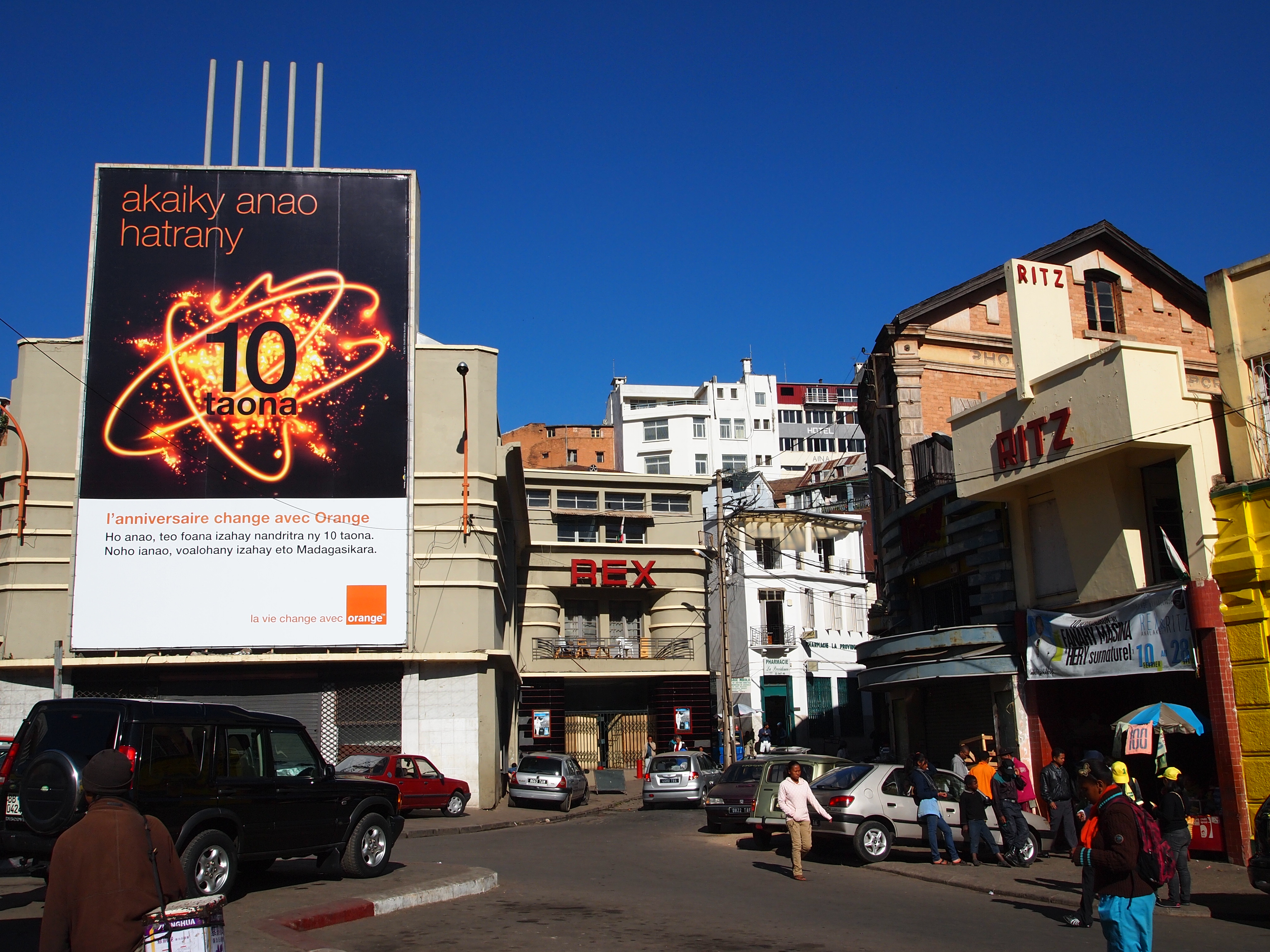
Cinemas Rex and Ritz

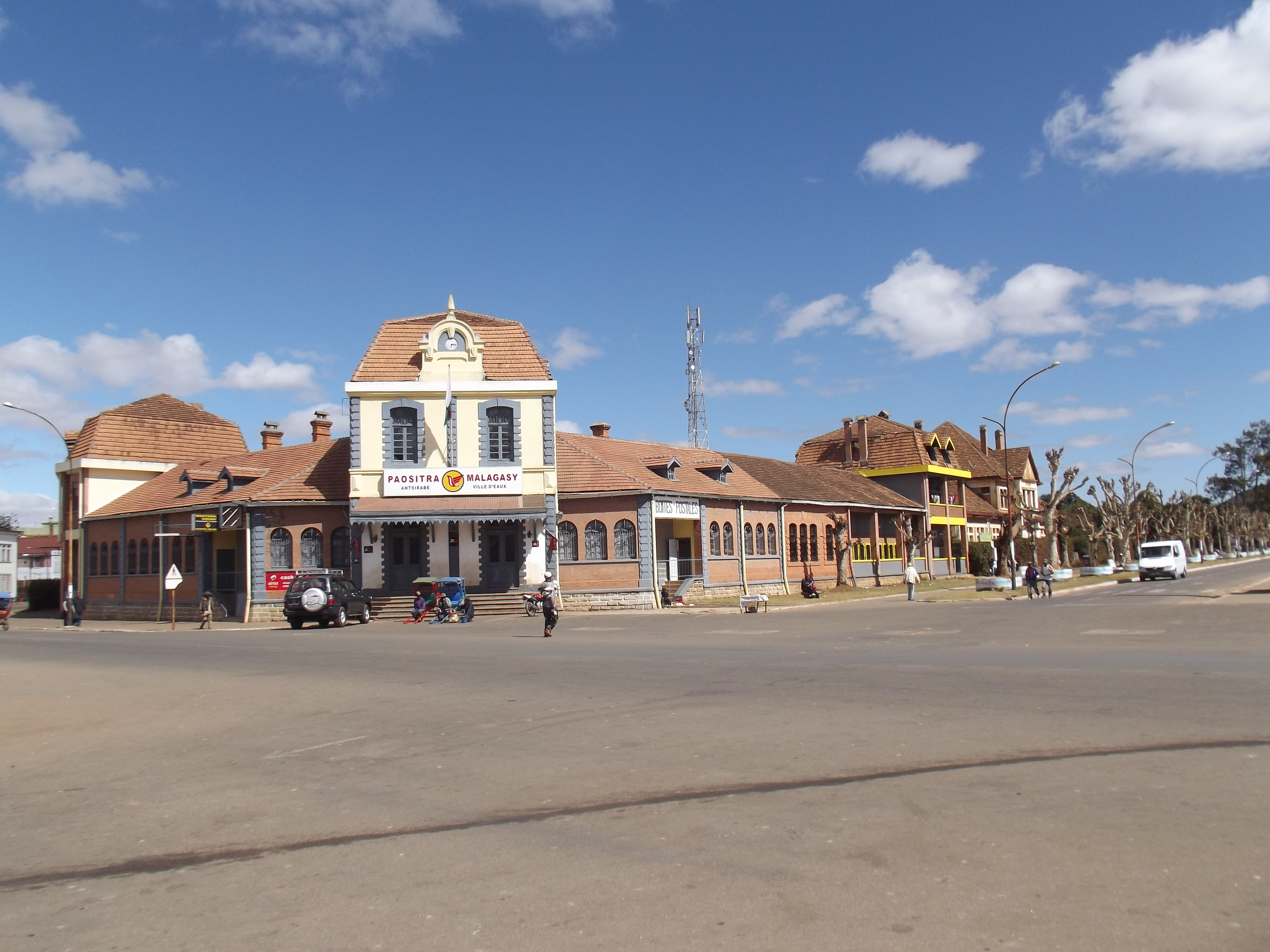
Paositra Malagasy: the post office in Antsirabe
