= List of airlines of Madagascar =

This is a list of airlines operating in Madagascar.

== Active ==
Airline	Image	IATA	ICAO	Callsign	Founded	Notes
Madagascar Airlines		MD	MGY	MADAGASCAR AIRLINES	2023	Formerly known as Air Madagascar
Tiko Air					2000	

== Defunct ==
Airline	Image	IATA	ICAO	Callsign	Founded	Ceased operations	Notes
Aeromarine					1991	2008	Operated Aérospatiale Corvette, Beech 99, Piper Navajo
Air Hotel					2003	2003	
Air Madagascar (1947-1961)					1947	1961	Renamed to Madair
Air Madagascar (1962-2023)		MD	MDG	AIR MADAGASCAR	1962	2023	Renamed to Madagascar Airlines
Madagascar Flying Services					2002	2006	
Madagasikara Airways		7D	AYS		2015	2020	
Madair					1961	1962	Renamed back to Air Madagascar
Régie Malagache					1934	1937	Operated Bloch MB.120, SPCA 41T
Transports et Travaux Aériens de Madagascar		OF	TML	TAM AIRLINE	1954	2002	
Tsaradia		TZ	TDS	TSARADIA	2018	2024	

== See also ==
- List of airlines of Africa
- List of defunct airlines of Africa
