= Nieuport-Delage NiD 590 =

French monoplane designed for policing

NiD 590
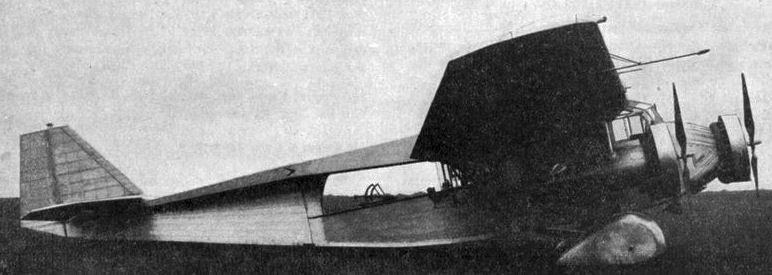

General information
- Type: Colonial policing
- National origin: France
- Manufacturer: Nieuport-Delage
- Number built: 2

History
- First flight: Between 27 June and 3 July 1932

The Nieuport-Delage NiD 590 was a three engine, high wing monoplane designed for policing and other roles in France's colonies, which did not go into production or enter service.

== Design & development ==
In 1930 the Direction Générale Technique issued a programme for an aircraft to operate in the French Colonies. It was to have three Lorraine 9N Algol engines, an all-metal structure and to be capable of reconnaissance, observation, policing and bombing as well as medical evacuations or general transport. The Nieuport-Delage NiD 590 was one of nine prototypes built for this programme.

=== Description ===
The NiD 590 was an entirely metal aircraft, with light alloy used for most of its structure and skin. The wing was in three parts, with a rectangular centre section and trapezoidal, cantilevered outer panels. It had a two spar structure, with ribs joining the two into a box to which the separate leading edge was bolted and the trailing edge hinged. High aspect ratio ailerons filled about 75% of the trailing edges.

The NiD 590's two pilots sat side by side at the front of the cabin. Their cockpit was semi-enclosed with glazing ahead and above but with open sides fitted with wind deflectors. They had dual controls and seat-type parachutes. This part of the cabin, under the wing, was conventional, with box-frame sides and bulkheads; just behind the seats there was an access passage with a side door from which both the controls and the rear cabin could be reached. Aft of this the final conventional bulkhead leaned backwards towards the tail, forming the start of the NiD 590's most unusual feature: the rest of the cabin was under an arched roof, extending from the forward cabin structure but the sides were only about 1 m (3 ft 3 in) high, with no glazing. Careful fuselage design deflected the slipstream beyond the rear of the cabin and provided its various occupants with a calm working environment and an excellent all-round and downwards view of the French colonies below. Their rear view was greatly enhanced by the very unusual rear fuselage: beyond the trailing edge the aft end of the cabin tapered rapidly in plan onto the vertical part of a T-shaped bulkhead supporting the arched upper structure. Behind it, the fuselage maintained this upper structure on two longerons, with very narrow, concave sides down to a third, lower, longeron. This narrow rear fuselage provided a wide rearward and downward view even from the back of the cabin where the rear gunner sat with a twin Lewis gun on a flexible mount.

The tail was conventional, with a near triangular fin and straight-edged rudder. The NiD 590's tailplane was straight tapered and mounted on top of the fuselage. Its undercarriage was fixed, its mainwheels on bent axles with streamlined drag struts and short, vertical oleo struts to the forward engine mounting frame. The wheels were enclosed in fairings, and there was a castering tail wheel. Steering on the ground was controlled through hand-operated differential brakes.

=== Powerplant ===
Two of the three 220 kW (300 hp) nine-cylinder radial Lorraine 9Na Algol engines were mounted under the wings at the inner-outer panel junctions, enclosed in narrow-chord cowlings on frames inside streamlined nacelles. These were suspended on a group of three short struts from the forward wing spar, two attached to a ring at the middle of the nacelle and a third to its rear. Another strut joined the nacelle rear to the rear spar. The third engine was in the nose of the fuselage.

=== Crew and mission equipment ===
The NiD 590 was described as a two-place aircraft but its military "Col 3" designation suggests it usually had a crew of three. Since it was intended to cover a range of tasks, crew numbers were likely to vary and there was provision for three parachutes in the cabin behind the pilots. As well as the rear gunner's position, the open part of the cabin had positions for navigation, ground photography, radio operation, visual observation and bomb-aiming. The NiD 590 carried grenades, which were delivered down a chute and twenty-four 10 kg (22 lb) bombs distributed from two racks.

== Operational history ==
The NiD 590 flew for the first time during the week 27 June - 3 July 1932. By the start of November it had undergone very successful trials at Vélizy – Villacoublay Air Base. It appeared on display at the November 1932 Paris Aéro Show. A second example was flown but the Colonial tri-motor contract was awarded to the Bloch MB.120, so no more NiD 590s were built.

== Specifications ==
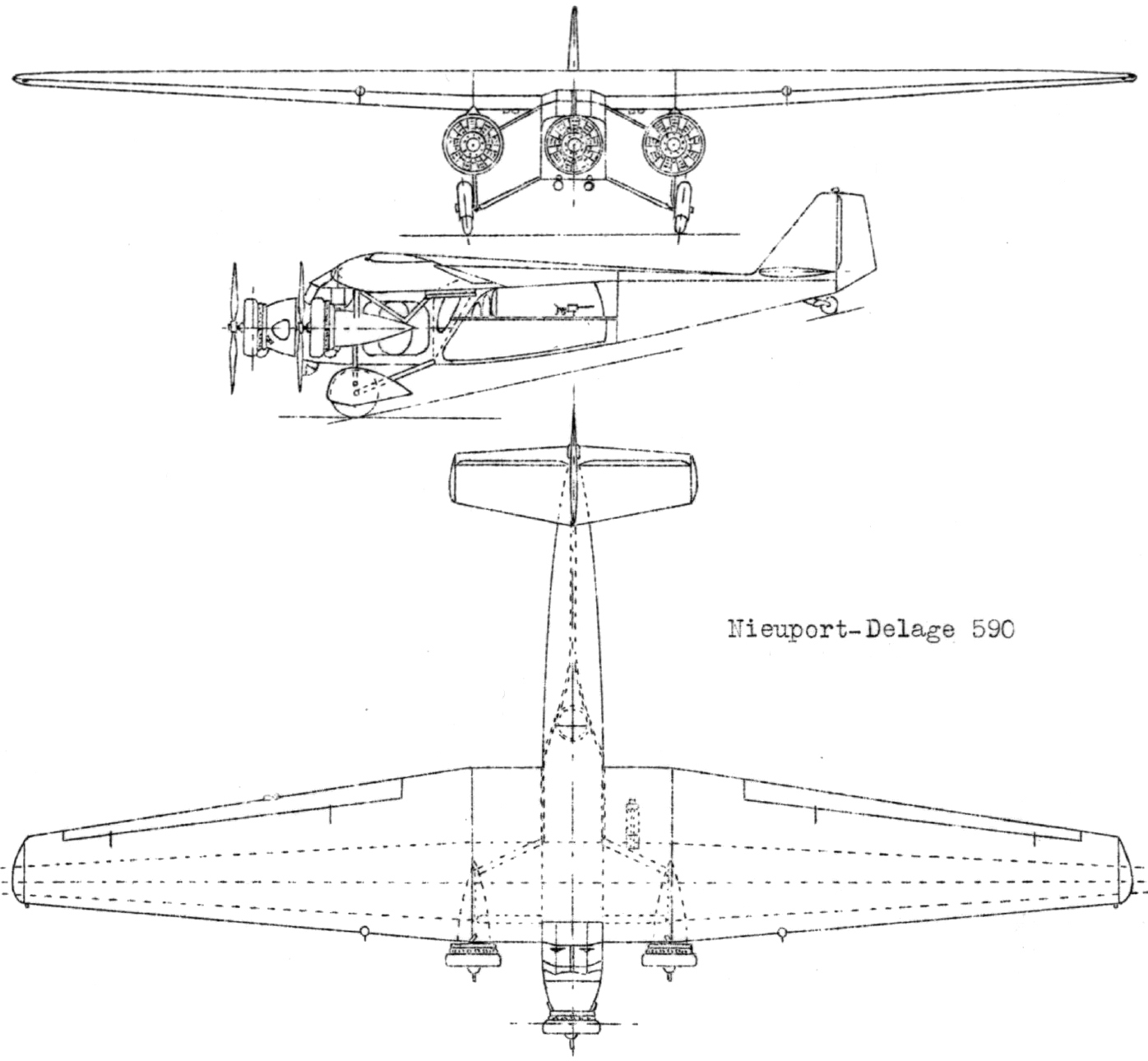
Nieuport-Delage NiD.590 Col.3 Colonial Transport drawing

Data from NACA Report no.173

General characteristics

- Crew: Two pilots, plus other crew according to mission
- Length: 14.71 m (48 ft 3 in)
- Wingspan: 25.89 m (84 ft 11 in)
- Height: 3.96 m (13 ft 0 in)
- Wing area: 70.2 m^{2} (756 sq ft)
- Empty weight: 3,403 kg (7,502 lb)
- Gross weight: 5,030 kg (11,089 lb)
- Powerplant: 3 × Lorraine 9Na Algol 9-cylinder air-cooled radial piston engine, 220 kW (300 hp) each
- Propellers: 2-bladed, 2.985 m (9 ft 10 in) diameter

Performance

- Maximum speed: 212 km/h (132 mph, 114 kn) at sea level
- Minimum control speed: 105 km/h (65 mph, 57 kn) at sea level
- Range: 1,300 km (810 mi, 700 nmi)
- Service ceiling: 8,000 m (26,000 ft)
- Time to altitude: 16 min to 4,000 m (13,000 ft)

== See also ==
Aircraft of comparable role, configuration, and era

- Bernard 160
- Bloch MB.120
- Potez 40

Related lists

- List of Interwar military aircraft
- Trimotor
