= Nieuport-Delage NiD 690 =

NiD 690

General information
- Type: Colonial policing aircraft
- National origin: France
- Manufacturer: Nieuport-Astra
- Number built: 2

History
- First flight: June 1934

The Neiuport-Delage NiD 690 was a French all-metal, single-engined colonial policing aircraft, built for a competitive government contract. Its unusual rear fuselage gave a wide field of downward machine gun fire. Only two examples were built.

== Design and development ==
In 1930, the French government set out several programmes for colonial aircraft to police their overseas territories. Covering single and multi-engine designs, all were to be all-metal and powered by the 220 kW (300 hp) Lorraine 9Na Algol radial engines, these contracts required two prototypes of each type, each shown to be capable of flight. Nieuport-Astra offered two types, the three-engined Nieuport-Delage NiD 590 and the smaller, single-engined NiD 690, which had much in common. Both had the angular appearance of the earlier single-engined NiD 540 airliner. The Nid 590 also had very similar dimensions to the NiD 540 but both newer designs differed from the earlier one in their novel rear fuselage structure.

The NiD 690 was a high wing, cantilever monoplane, with wings which were trapezoidal in plan. Its Algol engine was in the nose within a narrow-chord, Townend ring type cowling and behind it the forward and central metal-covered fuselage was, apart from the roof, flat-sided and rectangular in section. The pilots' enclosed cockpit was under the wing leading edge with all-around glazing of the multi-panel type and with lower side windows for better downward vision. Colonial aircraft were expected to fill a variety of roles, including transport, bombing, reconnaissance, observation, policing and medical, so needed a large and reconfigurable internal space. Since policing involved observation of and intervention in ground events, clear views and wide fields of machine gun fire were required. As on the NiD 590, Nieuport provided a long cabin behind the cockpit with windows on each side under the mid-wing and the trailing edge; towards the rear of the cabin its walls came closer together until they met the rear fuselage, which was T-shaped in section and built from three longerons, with T-shaped bulkheads and metal covering. Long wall openings towards the rear of the cabin allowed a gunner at its narrow convergence to fire backwards and downward as well as to the sides.

The tail of the NiD 690 was conventional and angular, with its trapezoidal tailplane and narrow, rectangular elevators mounted at the top of the fuselage. Its fin was triangular and the rudder was almost rectangular. It had a conventional, fixed undercarriage with each mainwheel on a V-strut hinged from the lower fuselage longeron and a long, vertical shock absorber strut to the wing.

The prototype made its first flight in June 1934 but in CEMA (the Centre d'Essais de Matériels Aériens at Villacoublay) trials it was judged overweight for the available power. The second prototype flew three months later, with its fuselage lengthened by 80 mm (3.1 in) and an extended elevator to rectify directional instabilities. Both NiD 690s had been retired by the end of 1934; the SPCA 80 was the only other single-engined competitor on the 1930 programme and it, too, was rejected for production.

== Specifications ==
Data from Nieuport 1909-1950, p.211-2

General characteristics

- Crew: two
- Length: 12.13 m (39 ft 10 in)
- Wingspan: 17.24 m (56 ft 7 in)
- Height: 3.483 m (11 ft 5 in)
- Wing area: 38.2 m^{2} (411 sq ft)
- Empty weight: 1,640 kg (3,616 lb)
- Gross weight: 2,430 kg (5,357 lb)
- Powerplant: 1 × Lorraine 9Na Algol , 220 kW (300 hp) at 1,800 rpm
- Propellers: 2-bladed

Performance

- Maximum speed: 200 km/h (120 mph, 110 kn) at ground level
- Range: 750 km (470 mi, 400 nmi)
- Service ceiling: 5,500 m (18,000 ft) service
- Time to altitude: 22.5 min to 3,000 m (9,800 ft)
- Landing speed: 85 km/h (53 mph; 46 kn)
