= R16 =

R16 may refer to:

== Roads ==
- R16 road (Ghana)
- R-16 regional road (Montenegro)

== Vehicles ==
- R16 (New York City Subway car)
- Lublin R-XVI, a 1932 Polish passenger and air ambulance aircraft
- Renault 16, a family hatchback
- Romano R.16, a high wing monoplane
- HMCS Crescent (R16), a destroyer of the Royal Canadian Navy
- HMS Triumph (R16), an aircraft carrier of the Royal Navy
- USS R-16 (SS-93), a submarine of the United States Navy

== Other uses ==
- R-16 or Restricted-16, a movie rating from the Movie and Television Review and Classification Board
- R-16 (missile), a Soviet intercontinental ballistic missile
- R16 (Rodalies de Catalunya), a regional rail line in Catalonia, Spain
- Aika R-16: Virgin Mission, an anime OVA series
- R-16 Korea, an international b-boy competition
- R16: Explosive when mixed with oxidising substances, a risk phrase
- Small nucleolar RNA R16
