= Weymann 66 =

66

General information
- Type: multipurpose military aircraft
- National origin: France
- Manufacturer: Société des Avions C.T.Weymann
- Number built: 1

History
- First flight: 1933

The Weymann 66 was a French multipurpose biplane built for colonial work in the 1930s. It had a low ground clearance cabin, three engines and twin tailbooms.

== Design and development ==
Charles Terres Weymann of Paris, France is best known as the designer of a briefly popular type of aircraft-style coachwork for fully enclosed cars, one of his businesses remaining active as a manufacturer of coaches and buses, but between 1929 and about 1934 the French company Societe des Avions C.T.Weymann designed at least a dozen aircraft. None of them reached production. The Weymann 66 was one of the last, appearing in 1933. It was designed to take part in a competition for a multirole aircraft suitable for policing operations in the French Colonies; the competition became known as Col. 3, and this was often attached to the designation both of the Weymann (as the Weymann 66 Col.3) and to the names of other competing machines. The Weymann 66 was intended to be capable of reconnaissance, including wireless and photographic work; ambulance and troop carrying; and bombing.

The layout of the Weymann 66 was determined by the wish to place the cabin as close as possible to the ground in order to provide easy access. It was a twin boom biplane, with the cabin mounted on the lower wing and with booms and its three engines at upper wing level. The flat sided cabin was a fabric covered, welded steel tube structure. Two pilots sat side by side and provided with dual control, well ahead of the leading edge. The radio operator and navigator sat behind, with the bomb aimer's position further aft. Long side windows stretched rearwards from the cockpit almost to the end of the cabin, which was about halfway between the trailing edge and the tail. The undercarriage was intended to be robust enough for rough field operation: long travel Messier oleo legs ran upwards in front of the lower leading edge to the start of the boom, forming a split axle undercarriage bearing large wheels with their centres (when parked) not far below the fuselage floor. A tailwheel was mounted under a fairing at the extreme rear of the cabin. There was also a wheel or bumper under the nose.

It was a staggered biplane with parallel chord wings of equal span. The wings had twin metal spars and were fabric covered. It was a single bay biplane, braced by N-form interplane struts; the interplane gap was large, with the upper plane well above the cabin top. The booms supporting the tail were steel, again fabric covered and mounted on the underside of the wing where they were at their deepest. At the forward end they merged into the fairings and mountings of the two outer engines, 300 hp (225 kW) Lorraine Algol radials. A third Algol was mounted centrally, on top of the wing and displaced longitudinally so the airscrew discs overlapped. Rearwards, the booms became more slender and carried the steel framed, fabric covered empennage. The tailplane and elevator was enclosed between two large endplate fins of semicircular shape, which carried horn balanced rectangular rudders. Two substantial streamlined struts ran diagonally outwards and upwards from the extreme rear of the cabin to the ends of the booms for support.

Little is known about the operational history of this aircraft, though it seems to have flown in 1933. It did not succeed in the Col. 3 competition, which was won by the Bloch MB.120. Not long afterwards Weymann withdrew from aviation to concentrate on his road vehicle business.

== Specifications ==
Data from Flight 1934

General characteristics

- Crew: 3/4
- Length: 11.76 m (38 ft 7 in)
- Wingspan: 15.34 m (50 ft 4 in)
- Wing area: 63.9 m^{2} (688 sq ft)
- Empty weight: 3,493 kg (7,700 lb)
- Gross weight: 4,990 kg (11,000 lb)
- Powerplant: 3 × Lorraine Algol 9-cylinder radials, 220 kW (300 hp) each

Performance

- Maximum speed: 240 km/h (149 mph, 129 kn)
- Cruise speed: 200 km/h (124 mph, 108 kn)
- Range: 1,000 km (620 mi, 540 nmi)
- Service ceiling: 5,500 m (18,000 ft)
