= Lorraine-Hanriot LH.70 =

1930s French transport aircraft

LH.70
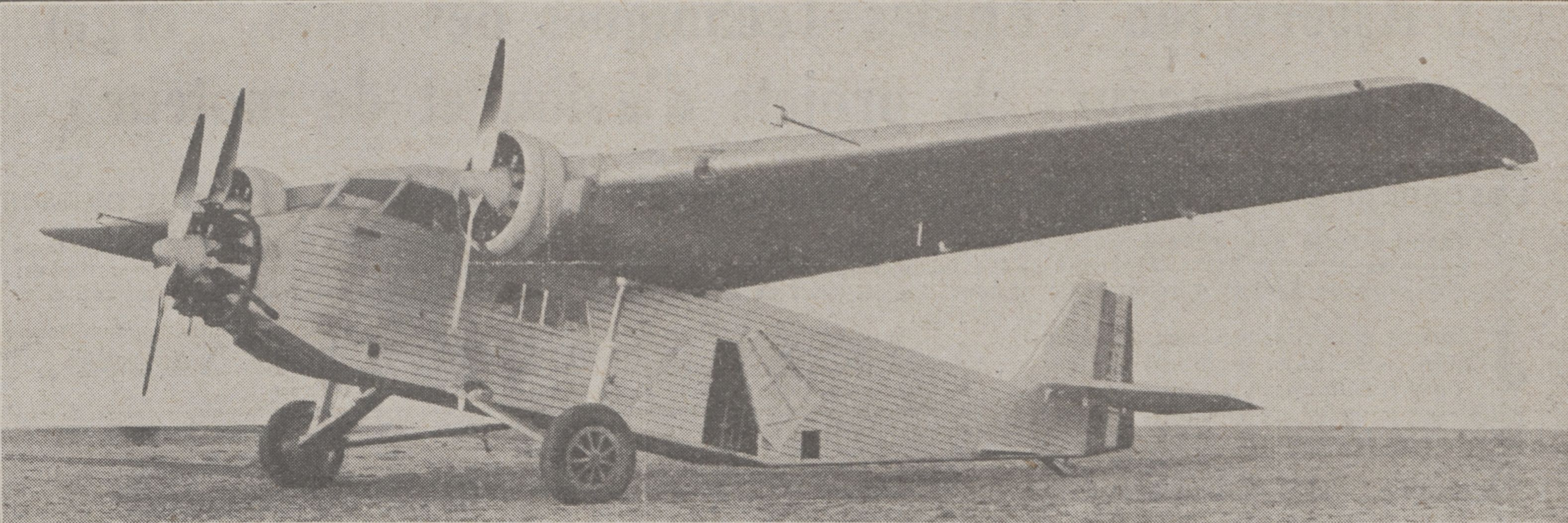

General information
- Type: Colonial policing
- National origin: France
- Manufacturer: Société Aérienne Bordelaise (S.A.B)
- Number built: 2

History
- First flight: Second half of 1932

The Lorraine-Hanriot LH.70 or S.A.B. LH.70 was a French trimotor designed to a 1930 government programme for a colonial policing aircraft. Only two were built.

== Design ==
The LH.70 was entirely conceived and directed by the Société Aérienne Bordelaise (S.A.B), one a series of nine prototype colonial policing aircraft from different manufacturers. The programme was led by the Direction Générale Technique and one of its requirements was for all metal construction to withstand the hot and humid climates of French African colonies. Another was to provide a large and flexible load carrying space, so it could be used for variety of tasks.

It had a high wing of trapezoidal plan, built in three parts: a short central section which joined the fuselage and two outer panels occupying the great majority of the span. The wings were constructed around four spars and, like the rest of the aircraft were duralumin skinned. There were high aspect ratio ailerons over more than half the span.

The LH.70 was powered by three 220 kW (300 hp) Lorraine 9Na Algol nine cylinder radial engines with narrow chord ring cowlings. Two were mounted on the undersides of the wings with full-chord nacelles behind them. The third engine was on the nose of the fuselage, which was in three rectangular section parts, built around four longerons and skinned with longitudinally corrugated duralumin. The forward part included the engine mountings and the enclosed cabin just ahead of the wing, seating the pilots side-by-side with dual controls. Behind that was the main load carrying space, up to 2.0 m (6 ft 7 in) high, accessed via a port side, obliquely hinged door just aft of the wing trailing edge and lit by a strip of small rectangular windows under the wing. The final part, which had a sloping underside, provided an open dorsal cockpit for an observer and reached back to the tail. There were three fuel tanks, one under the pilots' cabin and two in the rear of the wings.

The empennage was conventional apart from one feature. The trapezoidal fixed surfaces were built around pairs of spars and skinned with corrugated dural, with a cantilever tailplane mounted on top of the fuselage. Its slightly tapered, unbalanced rudder extended down to the keel and worked in a small cut-out between the similarly shaped elevators. The novel feature was the result of the colonial's need for multi-tasking and consequent wide range of centre of gravity. Instead of trim tabs, the LH.70 had a pair of trapezoidal winglets, mounted on the lower longerons about 2.2 m (7 ft 3 in) ahead of the elevator hinge and projecting about 850 mm (33.5 in) out of the fuselage.

To cope with rough colonial landing fields the LH.70 needed a robust undercarriage. Its 5.7 m (18 ft 8 in) track was determined by the separation of the outer engines, as each vertical, shock absorbing oleo strut was fixed to the second wing spar within the nacelle. Instead of an axle each wheel hub was mounted on a near-horizontal V-strut, hinged on the lower fuselage longeron. The wheels had hydraulic brakes. At the rear there was an oleo-damped, steerable tailskid.

== Development ==
The exact date of the LH.70's first flight is not known but it was between May 1932, when two examples were reported as under construction at Bordeaux-Merignac and January 1933, when one LH.70 was at Villacoublay where Descamps demonstrated it to S.T.I.Aé officials. At the same time the other LH.70 was at Bordeaux undergoing modifications. At Villacoublay modifications to the LH.70 required a redetermination of the centre of gravity. It was back in Bordeaux early in 1934, but soon returned to Villacoubly where, after three months, Deschamps once again demonstrated it to the S.T.I.Aé. It did not succeed in the competition for a production contract, which was won by the Bloch MB.120, and no more were built. Their history after this is not known.

== Specifications ==
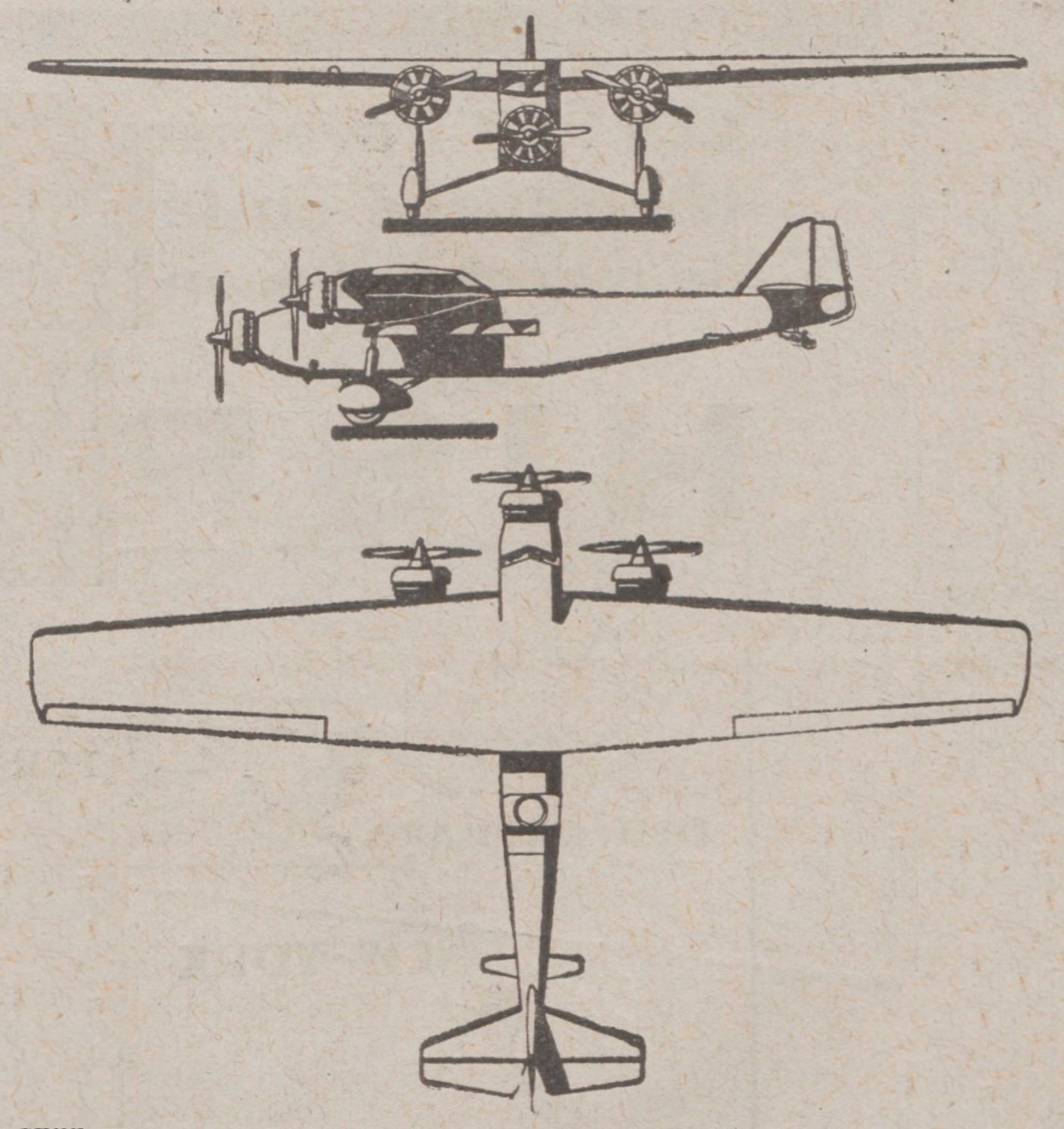
3-views of the Lorraine-Hanriot LH.70.

Data from Les Ailes August 1933

General characteristics

- Crew: Four
- Length: 15.8 m (51 ft 10 in)
- Wingspan: 24 m (78 ft 9 in)
- Height: 5 m (16 ft 5 in) in-flight position
- Wing area: 70 m^{2} (750 sq ft)
- Empty weight: 3,500 kg (7,716 lb)
- Gross weight: 5,250 kg (11,574 lb)
- Powerplant: 3 × Lorraine 9Na Algol 9-cylinder radial, 220 kW (300 hp) each at 1,800 rpm
- Propellers: 2-bladed Levasseur

Performance

- Maximum speed: 240 km/h (150 mph, 130 kn) at 2,000 m (6,600 ft); 190 km/h (120 mph; 100 kn) at this altitude on two engines
- Range: 1,250 km (780 mi, 670 nmi) at 180 km/h (110 mph; 97 kn)
- Service ceiling: 6,500 m (21,300 ft)
- Time to altitude: 6.5 min to 2,000 m (6,600 ft)
