= Régie Malagache =

Airline of Madagascar

Service de la Navigation Aérienne de Madagascar (SNAM), better known as Régie Malagache or Régie Malgache, was an early French flag carrier airline based in Antananarivo, Madagascar. It was merged in 1937 with Lignes Aeriennes Nord Africaines (LANA) and Compagnie Transafricaine d'Aviation (CTA) to form Régie Air Afrique.

== History ==
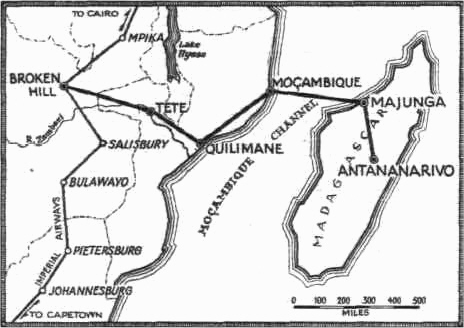
Routes serviced by the airline in 1934

At the start of the 1930s, mail delivery between France and Madagascar took 25 to 40 days by steamship. Various flyers had traveled from France to Madagascar by air, and Madagascar had formed a civilian air club and an embryonic military air presence, but there was no regular airline. To establish a fast airmail service, Malagasy Governor-General Léon Cayla petitioned the French Air Ministry for a direct air link between Madagascar and France. The French approved the new airline and supplied two trimotor SPCA 41T aircraft built by Société Provençale de Construction Aéronautique (SPCA) in 1934. The two aircraft were flown to Madagascar in stages from 13 June to 13 July 1934, commanded by pilot René Lefèvre, who was named director of the airline.

The first airmail flight between Tananarive and Broken Hill in Northern Rhodesia took place on 29 July 1934. The flights operated via Majunga, Ilha de Moçambique, Quilimane and Tete, where they connected with the Imperial Airways service between Cape Town and Cairo. The once-weekly flight carried 115 to 130 lb (52 to 59 kg) of mail, and reduced mail delivery times between Madagascar and Europe to 10–15 days.

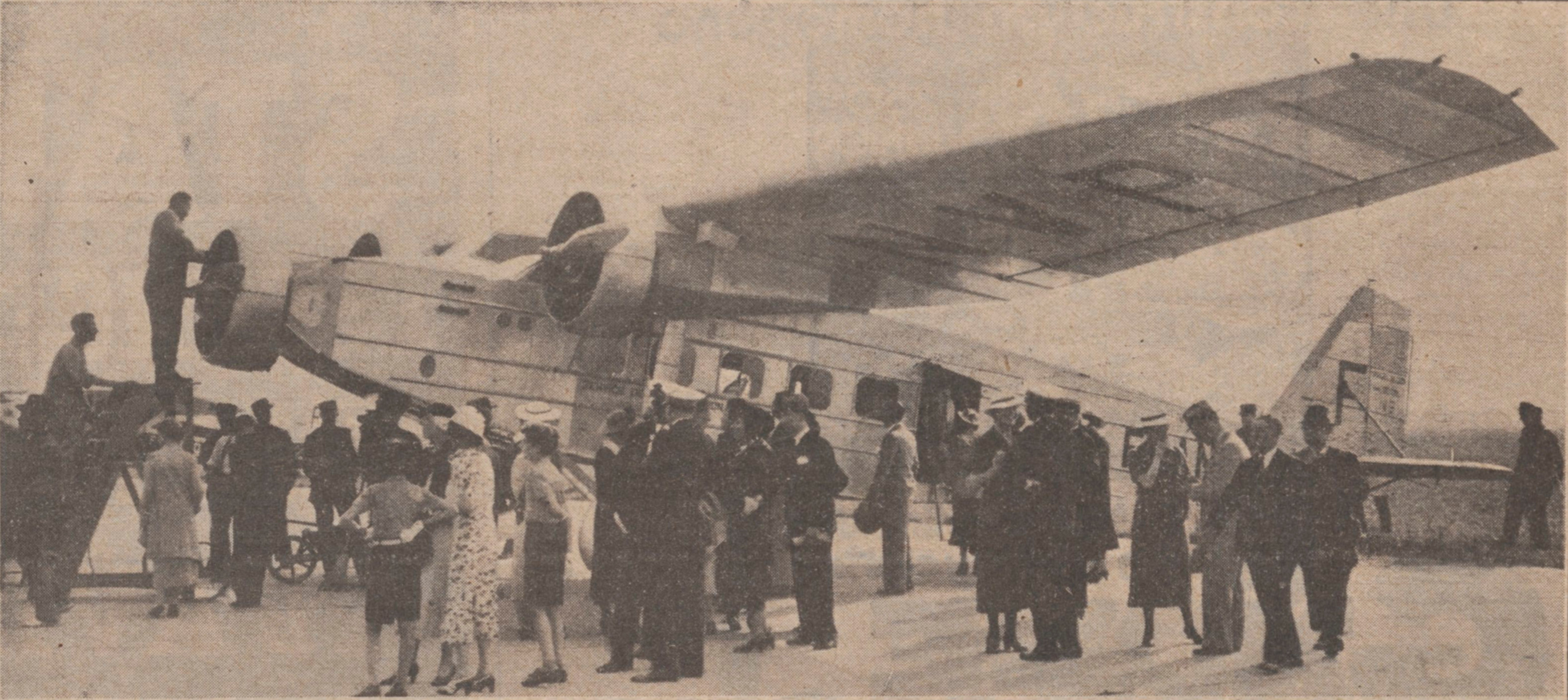
Bloch MB.120 Ville de Tananarive of the Régie in 1935.

Régie Malagache replaced the two SPCA aircraft in 1935 with Bloch MB.120 trimotors, and with these aircraft it extended its services from Broken Hill to Elisabethville; from where flights connected with Imperial and Sabena flights to Europe. In 1935 the airline flew a total of 22 passengers, and carried 768 kg (1,693 lb) of freight and 6,768 kg (14,921 lb) of mail.

The route to Elisabethville was later extended to Algiers and Marseille on 27 May 1936. On 1 November 1936, Régie Malagache began offering passenger flights in cooperation with Air France and Régie Air Afrique. Domestic services operated by Régie Malagache saw the airline flying Tananarive–Majunga-Diego Suarez-Maroantsetra and return to Tananarive, and Tananarive-Morondava-Tulera-Fort Dauphin-Ihosy and return to Tananarive. During 1936, the airline carried 182 passengers, 4,228 kg (9,321 lb) of freight and 3,496 kg (7,707 lb) of mail.

On 1 September 1937, Régie Malagache was taken over by Régie Air Afrique, which operated the route from Tananarive to Broken Hill. Domestic services were continued by Service de l'Aéronautique Civile.

== See also ==
- List of defunct airlines of Madagascar
