= Romano R.16 =

General information
- Type: Colonial policing aircraft
- National origin: French
- Manufacturer: Chantiers aéronavals Étienne Romano
- Number built: 1

History
- First flight: February 1933
- Developed from: Romano R.6

The Romano R.16 was a three engine, high wing monoplane designed for policing and other rôles in France's African colonies.

== Design ==
In 1930 the Direction Générale Technique issued a programme for an aircraft to operate in the French Colonies. It was to have three Lorraine 9N Algol engines and an all-metal structure, capable of reconnaissance, observation, policing and bombing as well as medical evacuations or general transport. The Romano R.16 was one of nine prototypes built to this programme.

Despite the all-metal requirement, the Romano R16 initially flew with a wing of mixed construction which was originally built for the rather similar Romano R.6 civil passenger aircraft. It is not known if the intended wing, all-metal and expected to be lighter, ever replaced it. On each side the high wing was in two parts, with a rectangular inner section attached to the top of the fuselage. The outer panels were straight tapered to rounded tips. The wing had two wooden box spars and spruce ribs and was entirely plywood covered. The centre section, over 40% of the span, was braced at its outer ends with a pair of parallel steel wing struts between the wing spars and the lower fuselage longerons, so that the R.16's wing was a semi-cantilever one. High aspect ratio ailerons occupied the whole outer panel trailing edge and camber changing flaps filled those of the centre section.

The R.16 was powered by three 220 kW (300 hp) Lorraine 9N Algol nine cylinder radial engines enclosed by long chord NACA-type cowlings. One was in the nose of the fuselage and the other were mounted under the wing centre section from the forward wing struts, aided by bracing struts rising inwards to the wing root and short vertical struts to the forward spar. Long nacelles behind the outer engines tapered to the rear wing strut.

Structurally the R.16's fuselage was built around steel tube longerons, giving it a simple rectangular cross-section. The pilots' enclosed cabin was below and just ahead of the wing leading edge, fitted with side-by-side seating and dual controls. Behind them there was a generous cabin, accessed via a large port side door. Aft of the cabin, just behind the trailing edge was a dorsal gunner's position. At the rear the fixed surfaces were approximately triangular and carried a balanced rudder and elevators, also balanced. Each tailplane was braced on the vertex of a V-strut from the lower fuselage. The tail surfaces were steel tube structures with fabric covering

The colonial aircraft were expected to have to use basic or unprepared strips, so needed a robust undercarriage. The R.16 had large 1,150 mm (45 in) diameter wheels, independently mounted and fitted with brakes that could be use for steering, enclosed under large fairings. Each wheel was on a cranked steel half axle from the lower fuselage with a trailing recoil strut and a vertical oleo leg to the engine mounting.

== Development ==
The R.16 flew for the first time in February 1933. By May the initial development tests at Romano's Cannes factory were complete. It then went to Villacoublay for its official tests, which were completed by early September.

The Colonial trimotor contract was awarded to the Bloch MB.120, so no more R.16s were built. The sole example appeared in the prototypes section of the French civil aircraft register as F-AKGE, with the type name Romano 160 and was used by the Commander of the 5th Aerial Region of French North Africa as his personal transport. A photograph taken at Cannes in 1937 shows that by then it had been adapted to carry passengers, the cabin now lit by long, continuous windows on each side. It also had a revised vertical tail with an unbalanced rudder.

== Specifications ==
Data from Les Ailes

General characteristics

- Crew: Three
- Length: 13.90 m (45 ft 7 in)
- Wingspan: 21.60 m (70 ft 10 in)
- Height: 4.05 m (13 ft 3 in)
- Wing area: 70 m^{2} (750 sq ft)
- Empty weight: 3,138 kg (6,918 lb)
- Gross weight: 5,200 kg (11,464 lb)
- Fuel capacity: 415 L (91 imp gal; 110 US gal)
- Powerplant: 3 × Lorraine 9N Algol 9-cylinder radials, 220 kW (300 hp) each
- Propellers: 2-bladed Ratier

Performance

- Maximum speed: 230 km/h (140 mph, 120 kn) at ground level
- Range: 1,200 km (750 mi, 650 nmi)
- Service ceiling: 2,400 m (7,880 ft) theoretical
- Time to altitude: 13 min 5 sec to 3,000 m (9,800 ft)
- Take-off distance: 150 m (490 ft)
- Landing speed: 81 km/h (50 mph; 44 kn)
