= Romano R.6 =

1930s French aircraft

General information
- Type: Civil transport
- National origin: French
- Manufacturer: Chantiers aéronavals Étienne Romano
- Number built: 1

History
- First flight: 20 December 1932
- Variant: Romano R.16

The Romano R.6 was a transport aircraft built by Romano in France in the early 1930s. It was a three engine, high wing monoplane transport of all-metal construction. A longer wing-span colonial police transport was also built as the Romano R.16.

== Specifications ==
Data from

General characteristics

- Crew: Three
- Capacity: 8 passengers
- Length: 13.90 m (45 ft 7 in)
- Wingspan: 19.64 m (64 ft 5 in)
- Height: 3.27 m (10 ft 9 in)
- Wing area: 63.00 m^{2} (678.1 sq ft)
- Empty weight: 3,047 kg (6,717 lb)
- Gross weight: 4,473 kg (9,861 lb)
- Powerplant: 3 × Gnome & Rhône 7Kb 7-cylinder radials, 220 kW (300 hp) each
- Propellers: 2-bladed Ratier

Performance

- Maximum speed: 216 km/h (134 mph, 117 kn) at ground level
- Range: 1,000 km (620 mi, 540 nmi)
- Service ceiling: 6,850 m (22,470 ft) theoretical
