= Bernard SIMB AB 16 =

AB 16

General information
- Type: 5 seat Colonial utility aircraft
- National origin: France
- Manufacturer: Société Industrielle des Métaux et du Bois (SIMB), sometimes referred to as Ferbois
- Number built: 1

History
- First flight: 1927

The Bernard SIMB AB 16 was a three-engine, five-seat utility aircraft designed and built in 1927 for general-purpose military work in the French colonial empire. The Colonial category, which led for example to the Bernard 160, was not properly defined until 1930 and the Bernard 16 was not ordered into production. It was the last Bernard aircraft built by the Société Industrielle des Métaux et du Bois (SIMB); later designs were produced by the Société des Avions Bernard.

== Specifications ==
Data from Les Avions Bernard

General characteristics

- Capacity: 5
- Length: 16.50 m (54 ft 2 in)
- Wingspan: 21.50 m (70 ft 6 in)
- Height: 4.00 m (13 ft 1 in)
- Wing area: 65 m^{2} (700 sq ft)
- Powerplant: 3 × Salmson 9Abd 9-cylinder radial, 220 kW (300 hp) each

Performance

- Maximum speed: 220 km/h (140 mph, 120 kn)

== Bibliography ==
- Liron, Jean (1990). Les avions Bernard. Collection Docavia. Vol. 31. Paris: Éditions Larivière. ISBN 2-84890-065-2.
