= Caudron C.180 =

- At the 1930 Paris Salon

General information
- Type: 10 seat Airliner
- National origin: France
- Manufacturer: Caudron Airplane Company (Société des Avions Caudron)
- Number built: 1

History
- First flight: 1930

The Caudron C.180 was an all-metal, three-engine French ten-seat passenger aircraft, flown about 1930. Only one was built.

== Design and development ==
The Caudron C.180 was a high-wing cantilever monoplane with metal structure and duraluminium covering. The skin on the wing was smooth rather than corrugated in the Junkers style (e.g. Junkers Ju 52). The single spar wing was in three sections; the inner part carried the outer pair of 224 kW (300 hp) Lorraine 9N Algol 9-cylinder, air-cooled engines well ahead of the leading edge, cylinders exposed, on faired mountings which merged into the wing. The centre section also contained the fuel tanks.

The third Algol engine was in the nose of the fuselage; behind it the cockpit was just ahead of the leading edge. The flat-sided fuselage consisted of two parts, bolted together, and contained a cabin for ten passengers with a lavatory and luggage compartment. The tail surfaces were straight-edged and conventional, with a balanced rudder.

The C.180 had a fixed tail wheel undercarriage. Each main wheel was mounted on a half-axle hinged from the lower fuselage and located by a hinged trailing strut, with a vertical, shock absorbing leg to the outer wing centre section below the engine, providing a wide track.

The exact date of the first flight is not known, but one source suggests 1930; certainly the aircraft appeared, flown or unflown, at the December 1930 Paris Salon. At that show the main wheels were enclosed in fairings. Intended to be suitable for work in the French colonies, the C.180 was designed to be powered by a range of engines, air- and liquid-cooled, in the 150–220 kW (200–300 hp) power range but only one Algol-powered example seems to have been completed.

== Specifications ==
Data from L'Aerophile Salon 1930

General characteristics

- Length: 14.6 m (47 ft 11 in)
- Wingspan: 24.5 m (80 ft 5 in)
- Height: 4.77 m (15 ft 8 in)
- Wing area: 70 m^{2} (750 sq ft)
- Empty weight: 2,690 kg (5,930 lb)
- Gross weight: 4,500 kg (9,921 lb)
- Fuel capacity: 650 kg (1,433 lb)
- Powerplant: 3 × Lorraine 9N Algol 9-cylinder, air-cooled engine, 220 kW (300 hp) each
- Propellers: 2-bladed

Performance

- Maximum speed: 225 km/h (140 mph, 121 kn) at sea level
- Range: 2,400 km (1,500 mi, 1,300 nmi) double radius of action
- Service ceiling: 7,000 m (23,000 ft)
