= ANF Les Mureaux 120 =

French night reconnaissance monoplane

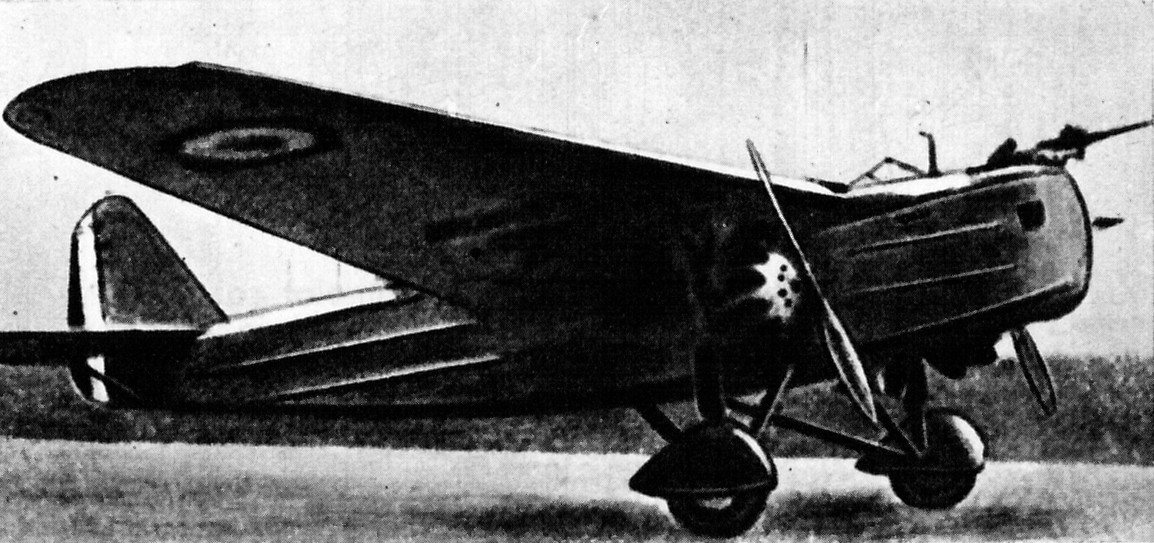

General information
- Type: Three-seat night reconnaissance monoplane
- National origin: France
- Manufacturer: ANF Les Mureaux
- Number built: 2

History
- First flight: 1931

The ANF Les Mureaux 120 was a 1930s French three-seat military night reconnaissance monoplane built by ANF Les Mureaux.

== Design and development ==
The 120 was designed to meet a 1928 French Aéronautique Militaire requirement for a three-seat night reconnaissance aircraft. The 120 was a high-wing monoplane powered by two 300 hp (224 kW) Lorraine Algol engines. The prototype was first flown in 1931 and was followed by a second aircraft, designated ANF Les Mureaux 121, powered by 300 hp (224 kW) Gnome-Rhône 7Kb engines. The aircraft failed to gain any interest from the French military and did not enter production.

== Variants ==
120
Initial prototype of the night reconnaissance aircraft powered by 2 x 300 hp (224 kW) Lorraine Algol engines
121
Second prototype powered by 2 x 300 hp (224 kW) Gnome-Rhône 7Kb engines

== Specifications (121 second prototype) ==
Data from

General characteristics

- Crew: 3
- Length: 11.2 m (36 ft 9 in)
- Wingspan: 17 m (55 ft 9 in)
- Height: 4.3 m (14 ft 1 in)
- Wing area: 45.5 m^{2} (490 sq ft)
- Empty weight: 1,592 kg (3,510 lb)
- Gross weight: 2,670 kg (5,886 lb)
- Powerplant: 2 × Lorraine 9Na Algol 9-cyl air-cooled radial piston engines, 220 kW (300 hp) each

Performance

- Maximum speed: 228 km/h (142 mph, 123 kn)
- Range: 1,500 km (930 mi, 810 nmi)
- Service ceiling: 6,500 m (21,300 ft)

Armament

- Guns: one twin machine-gun in nose cockpit and one in midship cockpit
