= Transports et Travaux Aériens de Madagascar =

Airline based in Madagascar

IATA	ICAO	Call sign
OF	TML	TAM AIRLINE
- Founded: 1954
- Ceased operations: January 2002
- Parent company: Air Madagascar

Transports et Travaux Aériens de Madagascar (TTAM) was an airline based in Madagascar. It was founded in 1954 and became a subsidiary of Air Madagascar in the early 1960s. It operated Piper aircraft and the ATR 42 on charter flights, on regional flights and for agricultural purposes. TTAM ceased operations in January 2002.

== History ==
TTAM was established in 1954 as Travaux Aériens de Madagascar (TAM). Its founders are Bernard and Pierre Obrecht, Travaux Aériens du Midi et de l'Afrique du Nord and the company Marseillaise de Madagascar, the primary stakeholder at the time of foundation. In the early 1960s, Marseillaise de Madagascar sold its shares to Air Madagascar. Between 1965 and 1970, the airline obtained three Piper PA-18 Super Cubs and ten Piper PA-25 Pawnees, most of which were used as agricultural aircraft. TAM also operated many charter flights.

The airline leased an ATR 42-320 in October 1994 and changed its name to Transports et Travaux Aériens de Madagascar (TTAM) around this time. TTAM later purchased its own ATR 42-500, which was used on flights to the Comoros, Mayotte and Réunion. The airline ended operations in January 2002.

== Corporate affairs ==
In 1998, Air Madagascar had a 34% stake in TTAM, while private individuals held the rest. The president of TTAM was Jean-Louis Rajaonarivelo, and its general manager was Solonaivo Rakotomalala. The airline had 140 employees at the time.

== Destinations ==
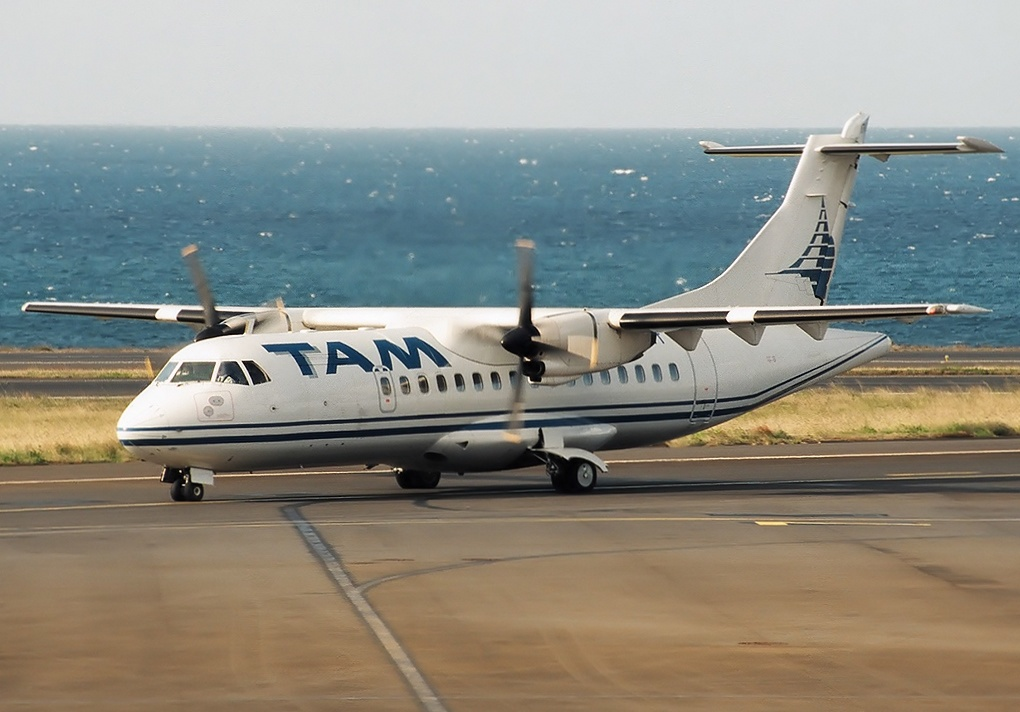
A TTAM ATR 42-320 at Roland Garros Airport in 1996

The airline's destinations included the following in 1998:
Country	City	Airport
Comoros	Moroni	Prince Said Ibrahim International Airport
France	Dzaoudzi	Dzaoudzi–Pamandzi International Airport
France	Saint-Denis, Réunion	Roland Garros Airport
Madagascar	Antananarivo	Ivato International Airport
Madagascar	Antsiranana	Arrachart Airport
Madagascar	Île Sainte-Marie	Sainte Marie Airport
Madagascar	Mahajanga	Amborovy Airport
Madagascar	Nosy Be	Fascene Airport
Madagascar	Toamasina	Toamasina Airport
Madagascar	Tôlanaro	Tôlanaro Airport
Madagascar	Toliara	Toliara Airport

== Fleet ==
TTAM's fleet included the following aircraft in 1998: one ATR 42-500, three Piper PA-23s, one Piper PA-31 Navajo and several light aircraft.

== See also ==
- List of defunct airlines of Madagascar
