= Madagascar Flying Services =

Aircraft leasing company in Madagascar

IATA	ICAO	Call sign
–	–	–
- Founded: 2002
- Ceased operations: 2006
- Fleet size: See Aircraft leased below
- Headquarters: Madagascar

Madagascar Flying Services (MFS) was a domestic aircraft leasing company in Madagascar from 2002 to 2006.

== Aircraft leased ==
According to the World Bank, the following types were leased

- LET-410UVP
- Cessna 206
- Piper PA-31-350
- Piper PA-32-300

== See also ==
- List of defunct airlines of Madagascar
