= Tsaradia =

Domestic airline of Madagascar

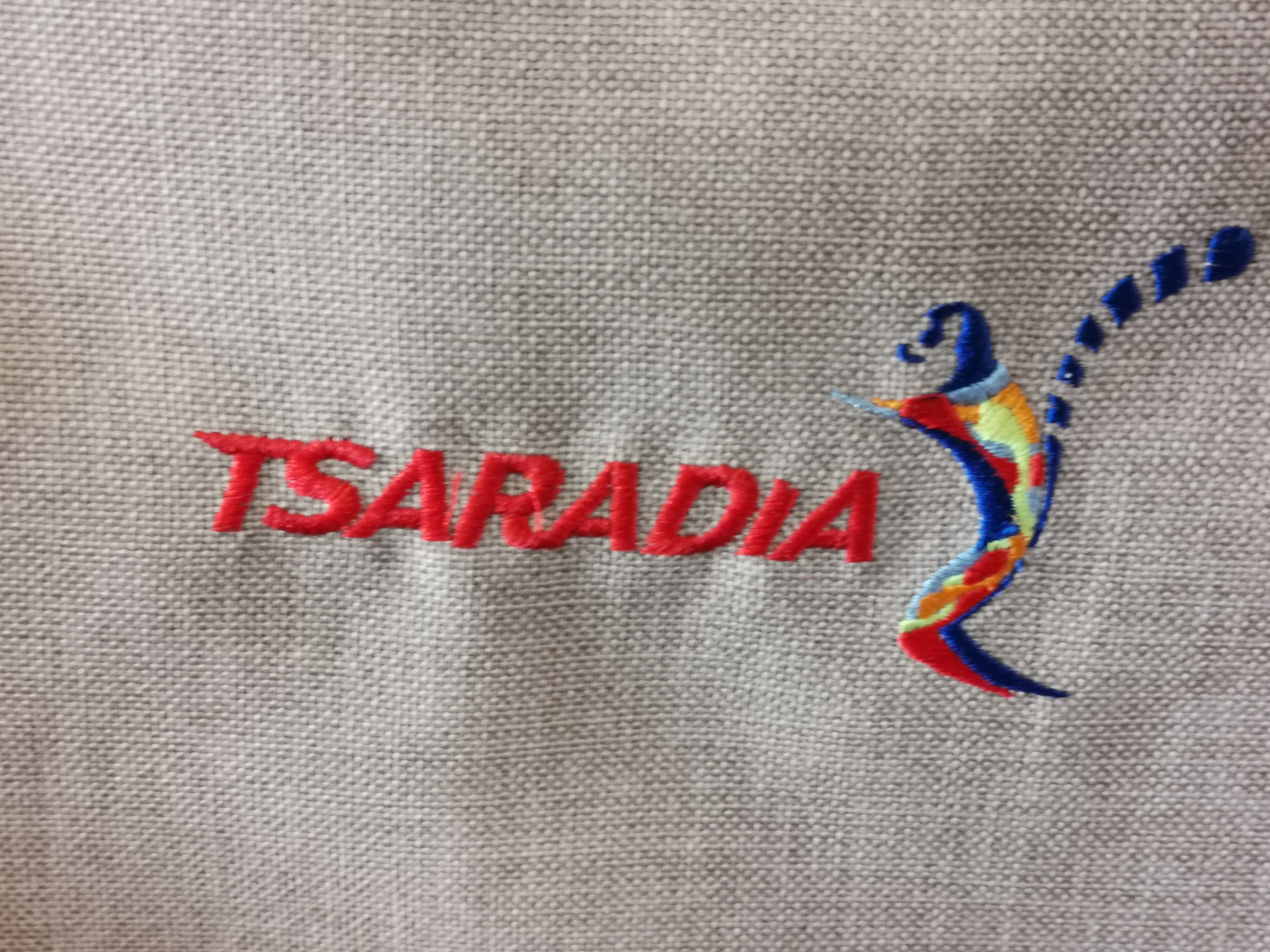
| IATA | ICAO | Call sign |
|---|---|---|
| TZ | TDS | TSARADIA |
- Founded: July 2018
- Commenced operations: 2 July 2018
- Ceased operations: 26 May 2024
- Hubs: Ivato International Airport
- Alliance: Vanilla Alliance
- Fleet size: 5
- Destinations: 10
- Parent company: Madagascar Airlines
- Headquarters: Antananarivo, Madagascar
- Website: www.tsaradia.com

Tsaradia was a domestic airline based in Antananarivo, Madagascar. Based out of Ivato International Airport in Antananarivo, Tsaradia serves the domestic destinations.

Tsaradia's name translates to "good flight" or "good travel" in Malagasy, the indigenous language of Madagascar. The logo depicts a colorful and stylized leaping ring-tailed lemur, an animal endemic to Madagascar.

== History ==
Tsaradia was launched as a subsidiary of Air Madagascar after a strategic partnering between Air Austral and Air Madagascar. The airline was originally planned to launch in April 2018 but commenced operations on 2 July 2018. The fleet comprised ATR 72s and de Havilland Twin Otters. The twin otters were retired in 2022 while the ATR 72s were merged back into the Madagascar Airlines fleet once Tsaradia ceased operations.

Air Madagascar took over Tsaradia's operations and became Madagascar Airlines in October 2021. Tsaradia flights ceased operations entirely on 26 May 2024, as Madagascar Airlines assumed full control of all its routes and fleet.

== Fleet ==
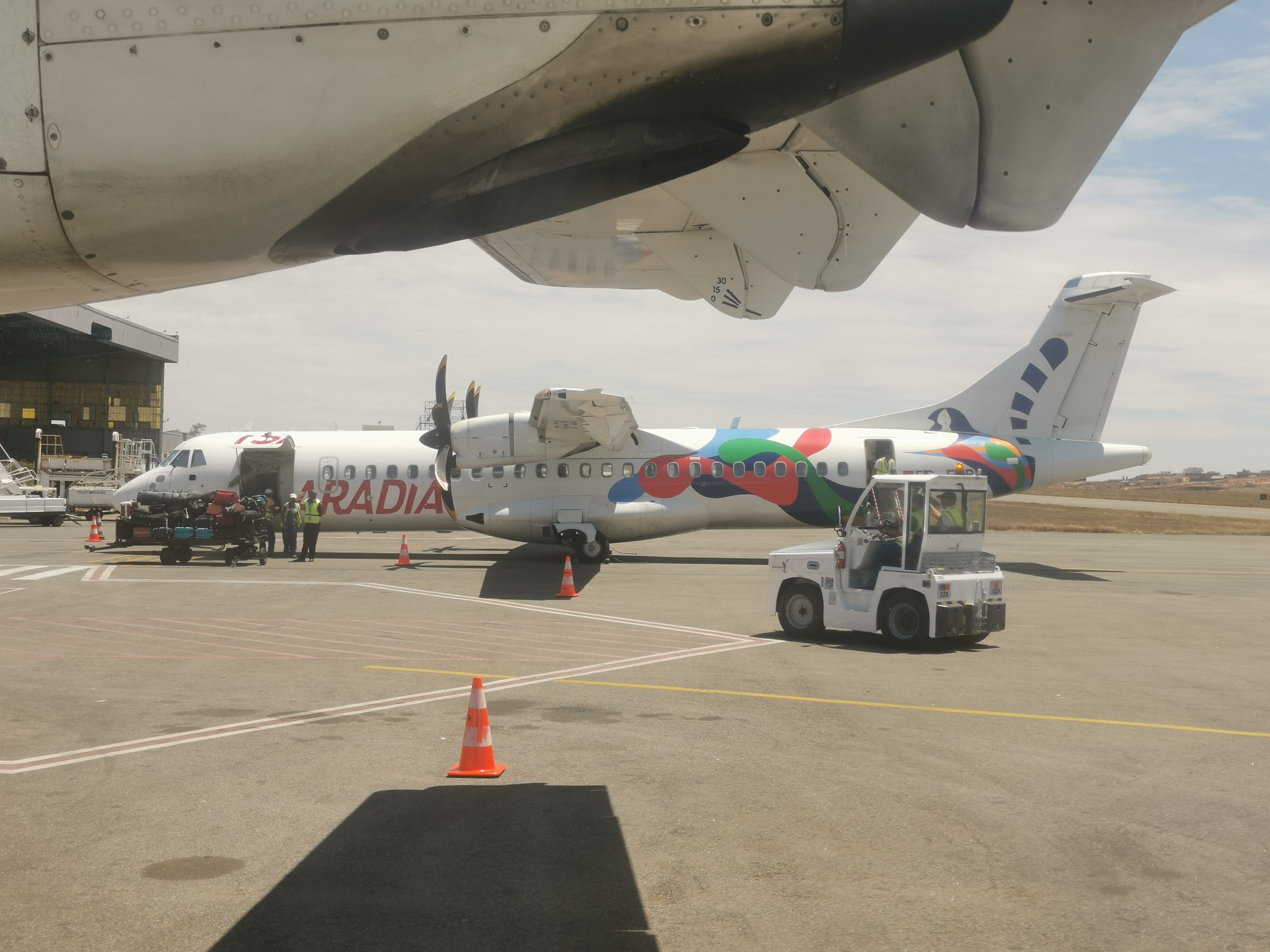
Tsaradia ATR 72-600

The Tsaradia fleet consists of the following aircraft:

Tsaradia fleet
| Aircraft | Total | Introduced | Retired | Notes |
|---|---|---|---|---|
| ATR 72-500 | 3 | 2018 | 2024 | |
| ATR 72-600 | 2 | 2018 | 2024 | |
| de Havilland Canada DHC-6 Twin Otter | 3 | 2018 | 2022 | |

== See also ==
- List of defunct airlines of Madagascar
