= Madagasikara Airways =

Malagasy airline

IATA	ICAO	Call sign
7D	AYS	ANKOAY
- Founded: June 01st, 2010
- Commenced operations: October 28, 2015
- Ceased operations: Active
- Hubs: Ivato International Airport
- Fleet size: 2
- Destinations: 12
- Headquarters: Antananarivo, Madagascar
- Key people: Captain Hery Manankasina RAOBELINA
- Website: madagasikaraairways.com

Madagasikara Airways was a Malagasy private airline founded in 2010 and based in Antananarivo, Madagascar. It was a full service carrier which operated domestic and international scheduled and charter flights, until its operations were suspended in 2020. It is awaiting the reinstatement of its aeronautical licenses following a ruling in its favor by the Supreme Court of Madagascar.

Founded in June 2010, Madagasikara Airways was established in June 2010 by Malagasy Captain Raobelina Hery Manankasina, a former Air Madagascar pilot and Airline Pilot with international experience, notably in the Africa,Middle East, Asia, Far East,including Vietnam. The company offers its customers comfortable travel with a long-standing expertise.

After several years of operational preparation, the airline launched its commercial operations on October 28, 2015, with a 30-seat Embraer EMB 120ER aircraft, on domestic routes connecting Antananarivo to Toamasina and Sainte-Marie. A second and then a third Embraer EMB 120ER were added to the fleet in March and November 2016. The airline also expanded its operations to include charter flights, with regional services operating in the Indian Ocean and sub-Saharan Africa. Madagasikara Airways serves ten Malagasy cities, as well as Moroni in the Comoros. In July 2016, Madagasikara Airways launched international routes to Saint-Pierre on Réunion Island, initially as ad-hoc flights and later as scheduled services. The fleet was diversified with the introduction of Beechcraft King Air B200 and Cessna Grand Caravan C208B aircraft, used primarily for charter and specialized operations. Between 2015 and 2018, its fleet consisted of three Embraer EMB 120s, one Beechcraft 200, and one Grand Caravan. From April 2018, the company introduced jet aircraft with the entry into service of two Embraer ERJ 145LRs, marking a significant step in its development. All scheduled and on-demand flights are operated by two 50-seat Embraer ERJ 145s.

In January 2020, Madagasikara Airways submitted an application to the Malagasy Civil Aviation Authority for designation to operate long-haul flights with an Airbus A330neo aircraft to destinations in Africa (Johannesburg, Dar es Salaam), Asia (Bangkok, Singapore, Kuala Lumpur, Guangzhou, Shanghai, Hong Kong), and Europe (London and Paris).

In February 2020, following an abuse of power by the Malagasy Civil Aviation Authority, Madagasikara Airways had its Air Operator Certificate suspended. According to public sources, this suspension was related to regulatory issues concerning the lack of approval for self-handling during ground handling, a document that the Malagasy Civil Aviation Authority itself was required to provide during the renewal of its Air Operator Certificate and operating license. Madagasikara Airways challenged this suspension decision in court and won its case. In October 2024, the Supreme Court of Madagascar overturned the suspension order. Despite this court ruling, the reinstatement of the authorizations (Air Operator Certificate, operating license, and associated approvals) remains pending administrative implementation to this day. Despite official notification in March 2025, the Civil Aviation Authority of Madagascar has still not complied with the court decision.

Judgment No. 77/SP.4, rendered on June 12, 2026, by the Council of State of Madagascar, confirms a previous judgment from October 2024 and pronounces the definitive annulment of the prohibition letter issued by the Civil Aviation of Madagascar (ACM), against Madagasikara Airways.This historic decision orders the immediate, automatic, and unconditional reinstatement of all the airline's aviation certificates (Air Operator Certificate, operating license, and self-handling ground approvals). The Council of State formally prohibits the ACM from imposing a new certification process on the company or from using gaps created by the regulator's own fault against it.

== Fleet ==
Madagasikara Airways operated the following aircraft:

Madagasikara Airways fleet
Aircraft	Total	Introduced	Retired	Notes
Embraer EMB 120ER Brasilia	3	2015	2018	Leased from Sahara African Aviation, South Africa
Embraer ERJ 145LR	2	2018	2020	Leased from RESIDCO, USA
