= Potez 40 =

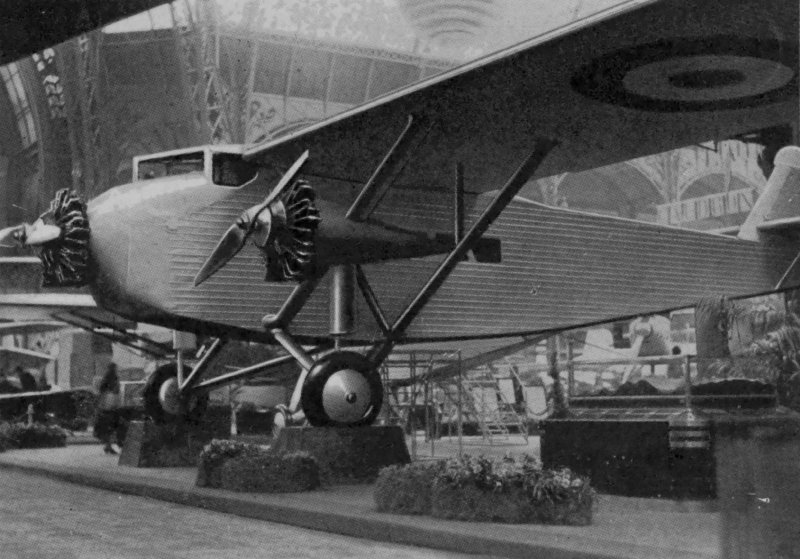

General information
- Type: Colonial policing and transport aircraft
- National origin: France
- Manufacturer: Societe des Avions Henri Potez
- Number built: 1

History
- First flight: Late February - March 1931

The Potez 40 was a French three-engine, braced high-wing monoplane designed and built in response to a French government programme for colonial transport and policing aircraft duties.

== Design and development ==
The Potez 40 was an all-metal aircraft covered with duralumin, longitudinally corrugated at approximately 100 mm (4 in) pitch throughout. The wing was rectangular in plan apart from its rounded tips and was built around two I-section spars. On each side a parallel pair of airfoil section struts braced the wing from the forward and rear spars to the lower fuselage longeron.

The fuselage was in three demountable parts. The nose region forward of the pilot was smooth and slightly rounded but merged into a corrugated, flat sided and rectangular cross-section fuselage. The central Salmson 9Ab 172 kW (230 hp) nine cylinder radial engine was mounted on the extreme nose, completely uncowled and driving a two bladed propeller. The pilot's compartment had a shallow, framed and angled pair of plane windscreens just ahead of the wing leading edge with an internal door to the main cabin, which was lit by long, shallow side windows and accessed by a large triangular door defined by the lattice fuselage structure. Just behind the wing trailing edge there was an open dorsal gunner's position, which at some point in the Type 40's development housed a pair of machine guns on a standard rotatable mounting The detachable rear section carried the empennage, which was constructed in a similar way to the wings. In early drawings the fin was triangular and the rudder unbalanced though this was modified by the time the Potez 40 was displayed, unflown, at the 1930 Paris Salon into a taller vertical tail with a clearly extended tip. The horizontal tail was mounted near the base of the fin and was semi-elliptical, with straight leading edges and recessed elevators. It was braced from below with a pair of struts on both sides

The two outer Salmson engines were mounted, uncowled, on the forward wing bracing struts, with extended streamlined bodies behind them which connected to the rear bracing strut; the forward struts were reinforced by jury struts to the wing roots and the rear bracing struts by vertical jury struts to the rear spar. The Potez 40 had a tailwheel undercarriage with its main legs with rubber shock absorbers mounted vertically below the outer engine extensions; the mainwheels were hinged on widely spaced V-Struts from the lower fuselage and were sometimes enclosed under spats.

The Potez 40 made its first flight at Méaulte around the end of February 1931 and after satisfactory initial trials was flown to the military test centre at Villacoublay at the end of May 1931. After a long period of modification, it returned to Villacoublay for competitive tests in late 1932. In the interval it was tested with two other makes of engines and proposed as a commercial transport. It was Potez's last three-engine design. By 1935, the development of the Potez 40 had been abandoned, and the airframe was offered for sale.

== Variants ==
Type 40-01
Salmson 9AB 9-cylinder radial engine.
Type 40-02
Lorraine Algol 9-cylinder radials.
Type 40-03
Commercial transport version with Gnome-Rhône 7K Titan Major 7-cylinder radials.

== Specifications (40-01) ==
Data from Les Ailes (2 April 1931)

General characteristics

- Crew: One pilot
- Capacity: mission dependent
- Length: 14.40 m (47 ft 3 in)
- Wingspan: 18.50 m (60 ft 8 in)
- Height: 3.15 m (10 ft 4 in)
- Wing area: 63 m^{2} (680 sq ft)
- Airfoil: Clark YH
- Empty weight: 2,582 kg (5,692 lb)
- Gross weight: 4,270 kg (9,414 lb)
- Powerplant: 3 × Salmson 9Ab 9-cylinder radial engine, 170 kW (230 hp) each
- Propellers: 2-bladed

Performance

- Maximum speed: 213 km/h (132 mph, 115 kn) at sea level
- Service ceiling: 5,800 m (19,000 ft) estimated
- Time to altitude: 22 min to 4,000 m (13,100 ft)
- Take-off distance: 180 m (590 ft)
- Landing distance: 200 m (660 ft)
