= Small nucleolar RNA R16 =

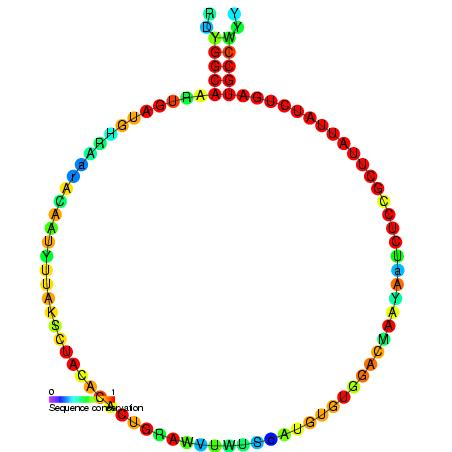
- Predicted secondary structure and sequence conservation of snoR16

Identifiers
- Symbol: snoR16
- Rfam: RF00296

Other data
- RNA type: Gene; snRNA; snoRNA; CD-box
- Domain: Eukaryota
- GO: GO:0006396 GO:0005730
- SO: SO:0000593
- PDB structures: PDBe

In molecular biology, Small nucleolar RNA R16 is a non-coding RNA (ncRNA) molecule identified in plants which functions in the modification of other small nuclear RNAs (snRNAs). This type of modifying RNA is usually located in the nucleolus of the eukaryotic cell which is a major site of snRNA biogenesis. It is known as a small nucleolar RNA (snoRNA) and also often referred to as a guide RNA.

snoRNA R16 belongs to the C/D box class of snoRNAs which contain the conserved sequence motifs known as the C box (UGAUGA) and the D box (CUGA). Most of the members of the box C/D family function in directing site-specific 2'-O-methylation of substrate RNAs.

snoR16 was identified in Arabidopsis thaliana. snoRNA R16 is related to another Arabidopsis snoRNA called R40.
