= Bernard 160 =

General information
- Type: Multi-role military aircraft
- National origin: France
- Manufacturer: Société des Avions Bernard (S.A.B.)
- Number built: 2

History
- First flight: April 1932

The Bernard 160 was a three engine, multi-role monoplane designed in the early 1930s to meet a French government call for aircraft suited to policing and medical duties in its African colonies. Two prototypes were built and tested, but no further orders were placed.

== Design and development ==
By 1928 there was significant government aviation activity in French African colonies. Initially this involved the Breguet 14, a largely metal-framed World War I bomber that was gradually replaced by the newer but wooden Potez 25. It was soon realised that in the hot humid climates, metal-framed aircraft were more durable and required less maintenance; as a result a new category for French aircraft, the Colonial type, was established. In 1930 the Air Ministry issued a programme with design criteria for both single and multi-engine types. The latter, designated Col 3, was required to have three 224 kW (300 hp) engines, providing the ability to maintain an altitude of 2,000 m (6,600 ft) with one engine out. It was to have four roles: photo-reconnaissance, whilst equipped with radio, a machine gun and 54×1 kg (2.2 lb) grenades; ground attack, with two crew and the same grenade load, an extra machine gun and 24×10 kg (22 lb) bomb load; ambulance, with one pilot, one medic and two wounded; and transport, with a pilot and four passengers. The high-wing design would improve ground visibility. In 1927, before this specification had appeared or the Colonial types had been defined, Bernard had built its 1927 three-engine, five seat Bernard SIMB AB 16 for similar tasks, but in 1930 prepared an all-metal version of the Bernard 60 T civil transport as the Bernard 160 Col 3.

The Bernard 160 was, as required, a three engine aircraft with a top-mounted cantilever wing. One of the 300 hp Gnome-Rhône 7Kb 7-cylinder, uncowled, radial engines of the first prototype was mounted on the nose and the other two on the wings. The wing was tapered with elliptical tips. The fuselage was flat-sided and rectangular in cross-section. The pilots had an enclosed cabin ahead of and just below the wing leading edge; below and behind them was a cabin with five rectangular windows, the rearmost in a port side door. The tail surfaces were rounded, with the tailplane mounted atop the fuselage. The fixed, conventional undercarriage mounted each mainwheel to the lower fuselage longeron with a V-shaped pair of struts. A thin shock-absorbing leg ran vertically to the wing at the outer engine mounting. The mainwheels were spatted; the tailwheel was not.

The first flight was in April 1932, piloted by Roger Baptiste. The second prototype, designated Bernard 161 flew in July 1932, powered by three 300 hp Lorraine Algol 9-cylinder radials. Its engines had short chord cowlings; it was 75 kg (165 lb) heavier than the first prototype but otherwise had the same specifications, including performance.

Many unsatisfactory test flights showed that, because of interference between the propeller airstream and the wing, the engines needed to be both lowered in relation to the leading edge and moved further forward. These modifications were completed by February 1933 and by August the two aircraft, piloted by Jean-Charles Bernache-Assollant, were undergoing official technical trials with the STIAé; these ended in November, and the aircraft were returned to the factory for further modification. They were returned for official testing at the newly formed Centre d'Essais du Matériel Aérien, in the early summer of 1934, but both aircraft suffered serious damage to undercarriage legs caused by locking brakes. Though they were both returned to the factory for repair, they were instead eventually scrapped.

== Variants ==
Bernard 160
First prototype, 300 hp (220 kW) Gnome-Rhône 7Kb 7-cylinder radial engines
Bernard 161
Second prototype, 300 hp (220 kW) Lorraine 9Na Algol 9-cylinder radial engines.

== Specifications (Bernard 160) ==
Data from Les Avions Bernard

General characteristics

- Crew: 2
- Capacity: Up to 5, dependent on mission
- Length: 15.77 m (51 ft 9 in)
- Wingspan: 22.00 m (72 ft 2 in)
- Height: 4.05 m (13 ft 3 in)
- Wing area: 67.6 m^{2} (728 sq ft)
- Empty weight: 4,087 kg (9,010 lb)
- Gross weight: 5,470 kg (12,059 lb)
- Powerplant: 3 × Gnome-Rhône 7Kb 7 cylinder radial, 224 kW (300 hp) each
- Propellers: 2-bladed

Performance

- Maximum speed: 240 km/h (150 mph, 130 kn)
- Range: 900 km (560 mi, 490 nmi)

== Bibliography ==
- Liron, Jean (1990). Les avions Bernard. Collection Docavia. Vol. 31. Paris: Éditions Larivière. ISBN 2-84890-065-2.
