= Chocolaterie Robert =

Madigascan Chocolate Company

- Founded: Toamasina, Madagascar (1940; 86 years ago)
- Founder: Mr and Mrs Robert
- Headquarters: Antananarivo, Madagascar
- Area served: Madagascar, France, United Kingdom
- Key people: Mr Ramanandraibe (President and CEO)
- Website: www.chocolaterierobert.fr

Chocolaterie Robert is the first commercial producer of locally produced chocolate in Madagascar. Bars of chocolate are the company's most widespread product and are sold under the name Chocolat Robert. The company was established in 1940 by the French-Reunionais Robert family in Toamasina and changed hands several times before being sold to a Malagasy business group run by the Ramanandraibe family, among the major Malagasy leaders driving economic development of the island in the post-colonial period.

== History ==
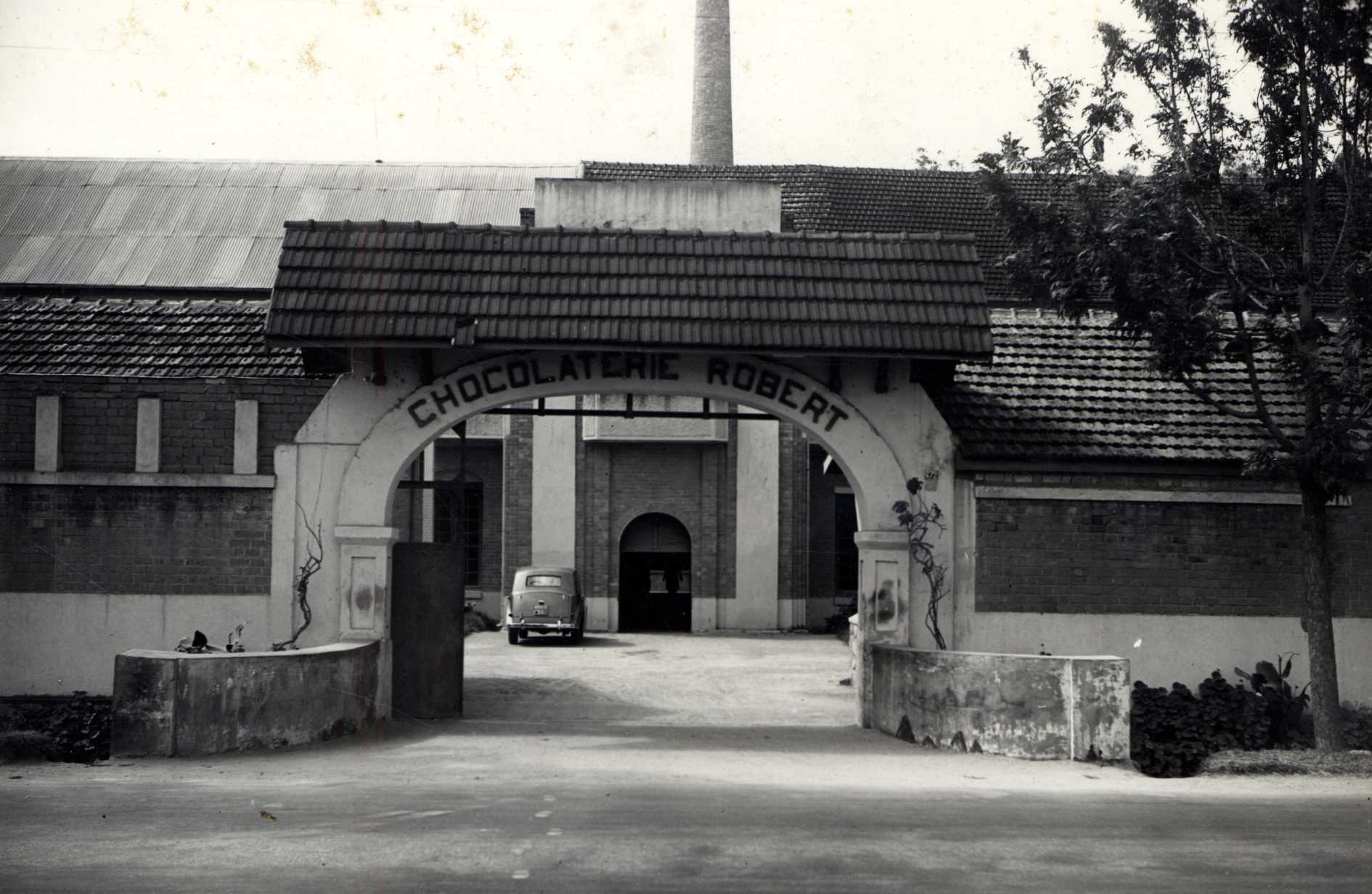
Antananarivo factory and boutique entrance in 1956

Chocolaterie Robert is the first brand of chocolate to be commercially produced and sold in Madagascar. The company was established in 1940 by Mr and Mrs Robert, a French couple from nearby Reunion Island. The couple began producing chocolates using local cocoa from Brickaville, where Madagascar's first cocoa plantations had been established by earlier French colonists. In 1948 the couple sold the company to a candy maker based in Antananarivo. By 1977 the company was owned by a French family named Berger who decided to leave the island and sell the chocolaterie to a Malagasy entrepreneur named Ramanandraibe, whose family were among the Malagasy economic leaders of the post-colonial period.

== Products ==
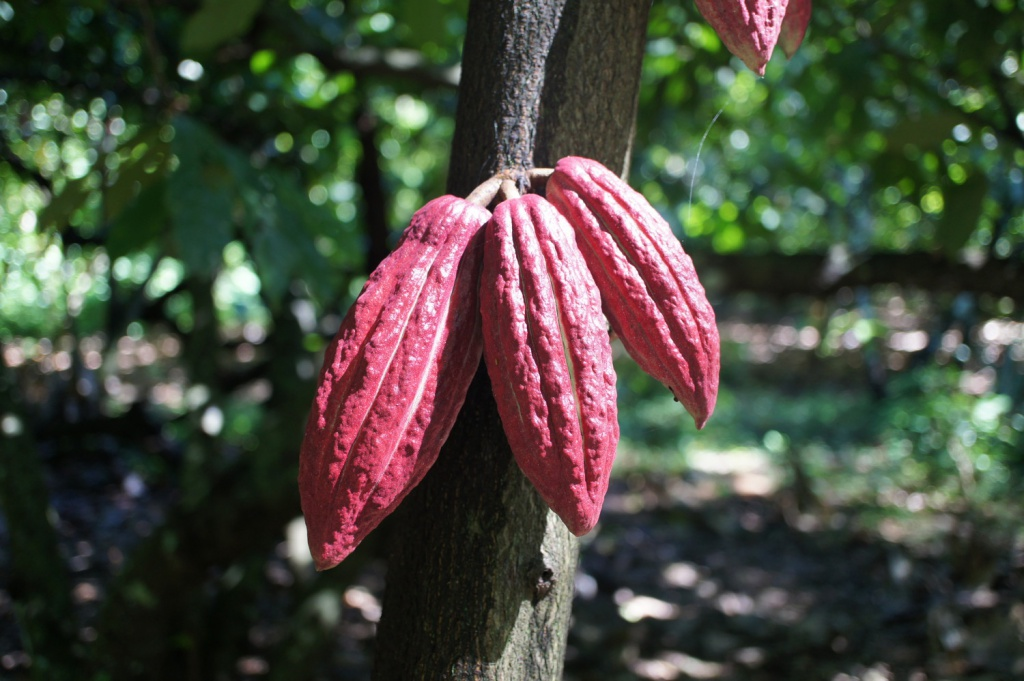
Madagascar cocoa pods

Robert chocolate bars (Chocolat Robert) are currently available throughout Madagascar and in 12 stores in France and one in the United Kingdom. Artisanal chocolates and other sweets are sold in speciality Chocolaterie Robert boutiques at seven locations in Madagascar. These include cakes, chocolate-based candies, baking chocolate, chocolate powder, and chocolate bars. On 18 October 2014, Robert chocolate won awards in several categories at the International Chocolate Awards in London. These included the gold medal for 50% milk chocolate, the silver medal for 85% dark chocolate, the silver medal for its white chocolate with vanilla, and the bronze medal for its 65% dark chocolate, considered the most difficult category with over 100 competitors.

== Operations ==
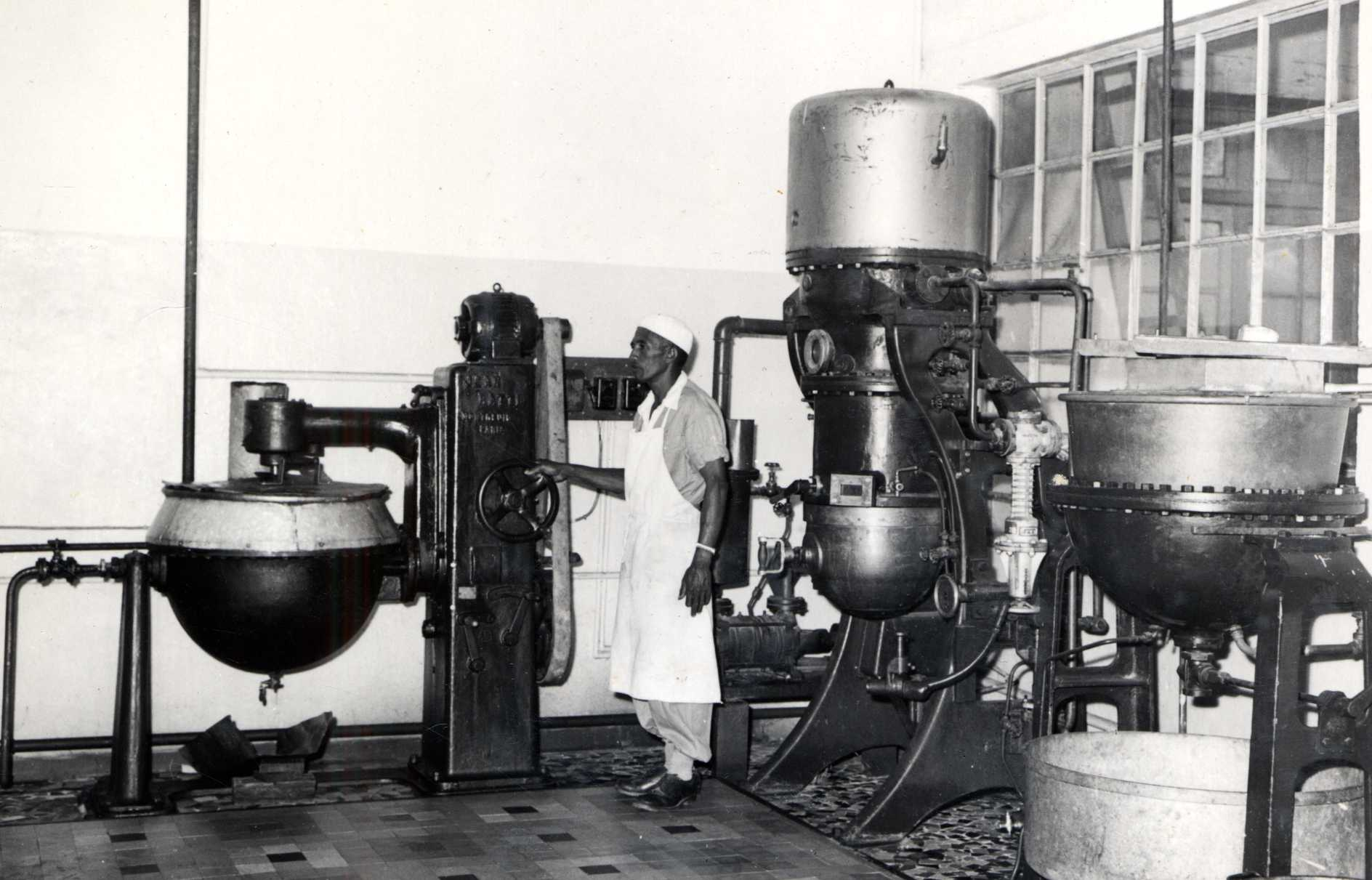
Caramel cooker, 1962

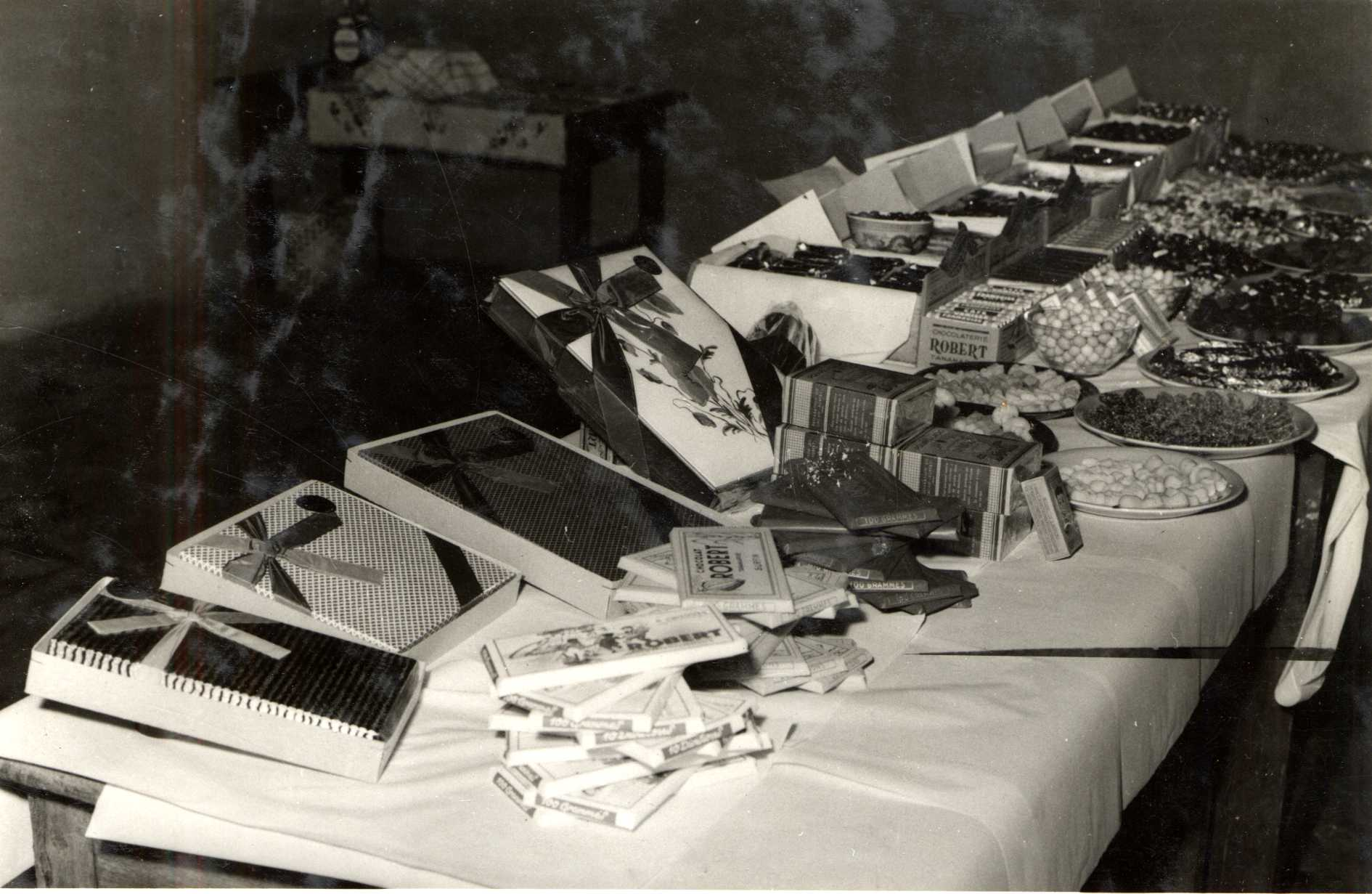
Finished products, 1962

The Ramandraibe group is currently working closely with the farmers of Brickaville to rebuild local expertise in cocoa production. Since 2012 the company has made intensive investments to further improve the quality of their chocolate in order to compete globally with international chocolate makers. To this end, the company established a series of cooperatives employing 125 farmers in the Ambanja region to produce top quality organic cocoa. New high performance machines were purchased for the Antananarivo factory, and the company has adopted British quality standards as required by the Hazard Analysis Critical Control Point in order to expand into the British market.
