= Lorraine Algol =

1930s French piston aircraft engine

Algol
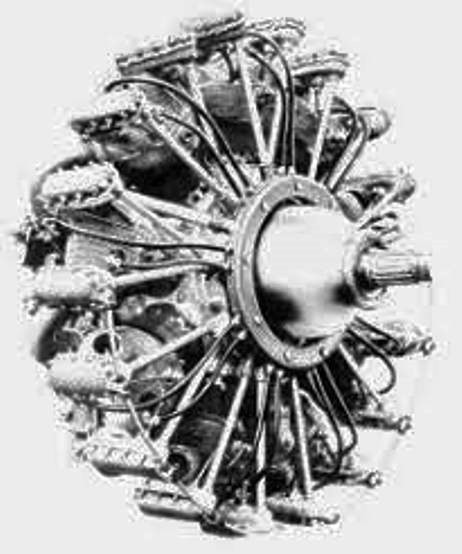
- Type: 9-cylinder air-cooled radial aircraft engine
- National origin: France
- Manufacturer: Société Lorraine, Argenteuil, Paris
- Major applications: Bloch 120
- Variants: Lorraine Sirius

The Lorraine 9N Algol was a French 9-cylinder radial aeroengine built and used in the 1930s. It was rated at up to 370 kW (500 hp), but more usually in the 220–300 kW (300–400 hp) range.

== Design and development ==
The Algol was a conventionally laid out radial engine, with nine cylinders in a single row. The crankcase was a barrel-shaped aluminium alloy casting, with an internal integral diaphragm which held the front crankshaft bearing. Forward of the diaphragm there was an integrally cast cam-gear case for the double track cam-ring. The reduction gear was housed under a domed casing attached to the front of the crankcase.

Flange-mounted steel barrels were bolted to the crankcase and enclosed with cast aluminium alloy, screwed-on, cylinder head with integral cooling fins. The pistons were also made of aluminium alloy and had floating gudgeon pins. The nine pistons drove the single throw crankshaft via one channel-section master rod and eight circular section auxiliary rods. The master rod had an integral, split type big-end. The crankshaft was machined from a single forging, with bolt-on balance weights.

The Algol had a single pair of overhead inlet and exhaust valves per cylinder. The cam-ring drove roller tappets, mounted in the cam-case, which in turn operated rocker arms, fitted with ball bearings, via pushrods. The cam-ring was concentric with the crankshaft and driven via epicyclic gears.

Most Algols were conventionally aspirated via a single carburetter but at least one 1938 variant used a form of fuel injection, where fuel was blown into the induction system rather than the cylinder head.

== Variants ==
9A
9Ab
9Ac
9Ad
9N Algol
9Na Algol
9N Algol-Junior
9N Algol-Major
9N Algol-Amelioré
Type 120 500 hp
A developed version with supercharger and reduction gear giving 500 hp (370 kW) at 3,000 m (9,800 ft)

== Applications ==
- ANF Les Mureaux 120
- Bernard 161
- Bloch 120
- Bloch MB.500
- Caudron C.180
- FBA 290
- Loire 11
- Potez 33
- Potez 40
- PWS-24
- Romano R.16
- SAB-SEMA 12
- Lorraine-Hanriot LH.70
- Weymann 66

== Specifications ==
Data from Jane's All the World's Aircraft 1938

=== General characteristics ===
- Type: 9-cylinder single row supercharged radial
- Bore: 140 mm (5.51 in)
- Stroke: 150 mm (5.90 in)
- Displacement: 20.78 L (1,268 cu in)
- Length: 1.347 m (53.2 in)
- Diameter: 1.275 m (50.2 in)
- Dry weight: complete 390 kg (860 lb)

=== Components ===
- Valvetrain: one inlet and one exhaust overhead valve per cylinder, operated with rocker arms, pushrod driven via roller tappets bearing on a double track cam-ring
- Fuel system: single Stromberg carburettor, heated by exhaust
- Fuel type: petrol
- Cooling system: air-cooled
- Reduction gear: 11:17

=== Performance ===
- Power output: rated 221 kW (296 hp)
- Compression ratio: 6:1
