= Tiko Air =

Malagasy airline

IATA	ICAO	Call sign
-	-	-
- Founded: 2000
- Commenced operations: July 2001
- Hubs: Ivato International Airport
- Headquarters: Antananarivo, Madagascar

Tiko Air is a charter airline based in Antananarivo, Madagascar. It operates charter services within Madagascar.

== History ==
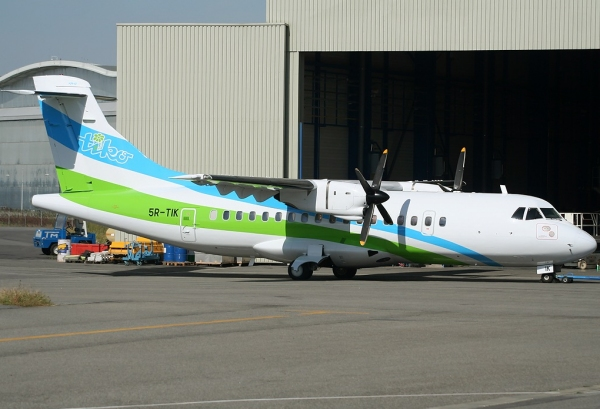
The Tiko Air ATR42-320 aircraft is carrying the brand-new design by the German Designer Joerg Zeitschel

The airline was established in 2000 by Tiko Holding Company (owned by former President of Madagascar, Marc Ravalomanana) and Air Madagascar. The airline began operations in July 2001.

== Fleet ==
=== Current fleet ===
As of November 2010, the Tiko Air fleet includes:

- 1 ATR 42-320 - registered 5R-MJT (previously registered as 5R-TIK)

=== Former fleet ===
- 1 Casa CN-235-10- registered 5R-MKM until June 2006
