= Bloch MB.120 =

MB.120
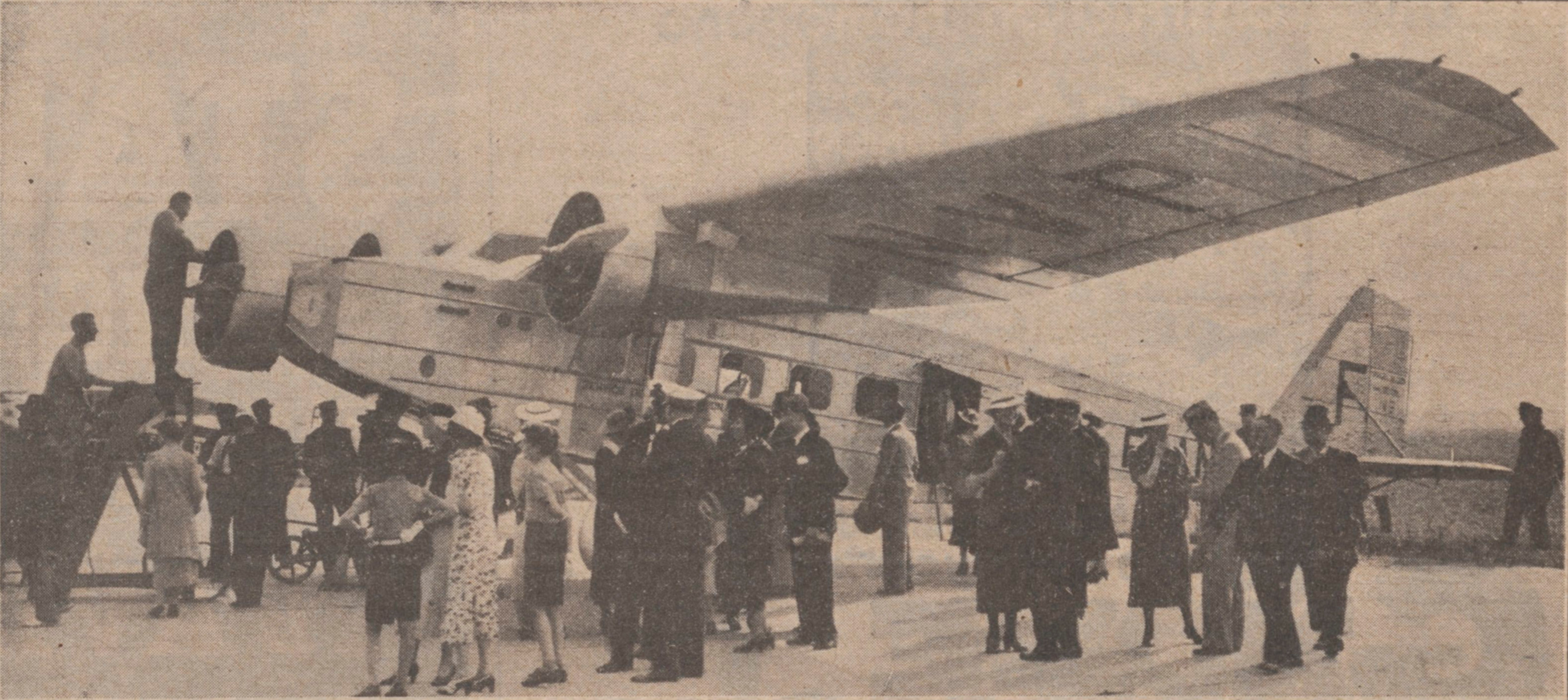
- Bloch MB.120 Ville de Tananarive flown by the Régie Malgache

General information
- Type: Transport/airliner/mail plane
- Manufacturer: Société des Avions Marcel Bloch
- Primary users: Air Afrique French Air Force
- Number built: 11

History
- Introduction date: 1934
- First flight: 1932
- Developed from: Bloch MB.71

The Bloch MB.120 was a French three-engine colonial transport aircraft built by Société des Avions Marcel Bloch during the 1930s.

== Design and development ==
The MB.120 design was selected by the French government for transport use in French overseas territories. It was an all-metal high-wing cantilever monoplane. The prototype was re-worked from the MB.71. Standard accommodation was for a crew of three and up to 10 passengers. The civil aircraft normally carried only four passengers, the rest of the aircraft was filled with mail. Ten production aircraft were produced, six for civil use and four for the French Air Force.

== Operational history ==
Bloch 210 in flight

The aircraft entered operation in 1934 for Air Afrique, which was a new airline set up by the French government on 11 May 1934 to provide service between the French African territories. Both the civil and military aircraft served only in French Africa.

== Variants ==
- MB.120.01 : First prototype.
- MB.120 : Three-engined colonial transport aircraft. Ten built.

== Operators ==
France

- Air Afrique
- French Air Force

== Specifications (M.B.120) ==
Data from

General characteristics

- Crew: 3
- Length: 15.3 m (50 ft 2 in)
- Wingspan: 20.54 m (67 ft 5 in)
- Height: 4 m (13 ft 1 in)
- Wing area: 61 m^{2} (660 sq ft)
- Empty weight: 3,700 kg (8,157 lb)
- Max takeoff weight: 6,000 kg (13,228 lb)
- Powerplant: 3 × Lorraine 9Na Algol 9-cylinder air-cooled radial piston engines, 220 kW (300 hp) each

Performance

- Maximum speed: 250 km/h (160 mph, 130 kn)
- Cruise speed: 200 km/h (120 mph, 110 kn)
- Range: 1,000 km (620 mi, 540 nmi)
- Service ceiling: 6,300 m (20,700 ft)

== See also ==
Related lists

- List of Interwar military aircraft
- List of aircraft of World War II

== Bibliography ==
- Cortet, Pierre (November 1996). "Le Bloch 120 (1ère partie)". Avions: Toute l'aéronautique et son histoire (in French) (44): 16–19. ISSN 1243-8650.
- Cortet, Pierre (December 1996). "Le Bloch 120 (2ème partie)". Avions: Toute l'aéronautique et son histoire (in French) (45): 17–19. ISSN 1243-8650.
