= List of aircraft (Li–Lz) =

This is a list of aircraft in alphabetical order beginning with 'Li' through 'Lz'.

== Li–Lz ==
=== Liaoning Ruixiang ===
(Liaoning Ruixiang General Aviation Manufacture Company Limited, Shenyang, China)

- Liaoning Ruixiang RX1E

=== Liberty ===
(Liberty Airship Co (Pres: D H Felton), Muskogee, OK)

- Liberty 1918 airship

=== Liberty ===
(Liberty Aircraft Co, Kansas City, KS )

- Liberty 1931 Aeroplane

=== Liberty ===
(Liberty Aircraft Sales & Mfg Co, Lambert Field, Robertson, MO)

- Liberty P-2 (a.k.a. Liberty A)

=== Liberty ===
(O N Lloyd, Mesa AZ; aka Mesa Air Development Assn.)

- Liberty Sport A

=== Liberty ===
(Liberty Aerospace, Melbourne, FL)

- Liberty XL-2

=== Liberty Bell ===
(1928: Midwest Aircraft Corp, St Cloud MN. 1928: North Star Aircraft Corp (Fdr: Willard Hoseas Mohlar))

- Liberty Bell 100-HM4a

=== LIBIS ===
(Letalski Institut Branko Ivanus Slovenija)

- LIBIS LK-1
- LIBIS KB-6 Matajur
- LIBIS KB-11 Branko
- LIBIS 160
- LIBIS 180

=== Lift Systems ===
(Lift Systems Inc.)

- Lift Systems LS-3

=== Lige ===
(Eugene H Lige, Auburn, IN)

- Lige Sport

=== Ligeti ===
(Ligeti aero-Nautical Pty. Ltd.)

- Ligeti Startos

=== Light ===
(Light Aircraft Developers, San Diego, CA)

- Light F-15

=== Light Miniature Aircraft ===
(Light Miniature Aircraft, Okeechobee, FL)

- Light Miniature Aircraft LM-1
- Light Miniature Aircraft LM-2
- Light Miniature Aircraft LM-3
- Light Miniature Aircraft LM-5
- Light Miniature Aircraft LM-J3-W
- Light Miniature Aircraft LM-TC-W

=== Light Wing ===
(Light Wing AG Aircraft, Stans, Switzerland)

- Light Wing AC4

=== Lightning Bug ===
(Lightning Bug Aircraft Corp, Sheldon, SC)

- Lightning Bug 199? Monoplane

=== Lightsey ===
(Mark A Lightsey, aka AeroCraftsman Replicas, Rubidoux, CA)

- Lightsey Caudron C.460

=== Lightwing ===
(John M. Lee)

- Lightwing Rooster

=== Lignel ===
(Jean Lignel)(see:SFCA)

=== Ligreau ===
(G. Ligreau)

- Ligreau GL.4

=== Likosiak ===
(Cazimir Likosiak, 7508 Kenwood Ave, Chicago, IL)

- Likosiak 1926 Biplane

=== Lilienthal ===
- Derwitzer Glider

=== Lilienthal Aviation ===
(Ukraine)

- Lilienthal X-32 Bekas

=== Likosiak ===
((Max T) Lillie School of Aviation, Cicero, IL)

- Lillie Tractor

=== Lilium ===
- Lilium Jet

=== Limbach ===
(Gus Limbach)

- Limbach Gusty

=== Linburg ===
(Vincent J Linburg, St Louis, MO)

- Linburg Special

=== Lincoln-Flagg ===
- Lincoln-Flagg-1

=== Lincoln-Page ===
(1920: Nebraska Aircraft, Lincoln, NE, 1923: Lincoln-Standard Aircraft Co. c.1925: Lincoln-(Ray) Page Aircraft Co. 1928: Reorganized as Lincoln Aircraft Co. 1930: Merger of Lincoln and American Eagle operations as (Victor H) Roos Lincoln Aircraft Co, Lincoln, NE)

- Lincoln AP All-Purpose
- Lincoln J-1 Sport
- Lincoln-Page LP-3
- Lincoln-Page PT
- Lincoln AP
- Lincoln-Standard Cabin Cruiser (a.k.a. Lincoln-Standard HS)
- LincolnStandard J-1 Speedster
- LincolnStandard J-2
- LincolnStandard LS-2 Sportplane
- LincolnStandard LS-5
- Lincoln-Standard Raceabout
- Lincoln-Standard Sport
- Roos Lincoln Playboy

=== Lindsay (aviator) ===
- lindsay 1909 Biplane

=== Lindsey ===
(Ray Lindsey, Portland, OR)

- Lindsey 1967 Monoplane

=== Linke-Hofmann ===
- Linke-Hofmann R.I
- Linke-Hofmann R.II

=== Linn ===
(Charles C Linn, Lancaster, CA)

- Linn Mini-Mustang

=== Lion ===
(Lion Airplane Co, Portland, OR)

- Lion A

=== Lioré ===
(Fernand Lioré)

- Lioré No.1 1908
- Lioré No.2 1910

=== Lioré et Olivier ===
(Fernand Lioré et Henri Olivier)

- Lioré et Olivier LeO 1
- Lioré et Olivier LeO 2
- Lioré et Olivier LeO 3
- Lioré et Olivier LeO 4
- Lioré et Olivier LeO 4/1
- Lioré et Olivier LeO 4bis
- Lioré et Olivier LeO 5
- Lioré et Olivier LeO H-6
- Lioré et Olivier LeO H-6/2
- Lioré et Olivier LeO 7
- Lioré et Olivier LeO 8
- Lioré et Olivier LeO 9
- Lioré et Olivier LeO H-10
- Lioré et Olivier LeO 11
- Lioré et Olivier LeO 12
- Lioré et Olivier LeO H-13
- Lioré et Olivier LeO H-14
- Lioré et Olivier LeO H-150
- Lioré et Olivier LeO H-151
- Lioré et Olivier LeO H-152
- Lioré et Olivier LeO H-16 to STAe spec. HB.4
- Lioré et Olivier LeO H-180
- Lioré et Olivier LeO H-181
- Lioré et Olivier LeO H-182
- Lioré et Olivier LeO H-190
- Lioré et Olivier LeO 20
- Lioré et Olivier LeO H-20
- Lioré et Olivier LeO 21
- Lioré et Olivier LeO H-22
- Lioré et Olivier LeO H-221
- Lioré et Olivier LeO H-23
- Lioré et Olivier LeO H-232
- Lioré et Olivier LeO H-24
- Lioré et Olivier LeO H-246
- Lioré et Olivier LeO 25
- Lioré et Olivier LeO H-27
- Lioré et Olivier LeO 300
- Lioré et Olivier LeO 301
- Lioré et Olivier LeO 40
- Lioré et Olivier LeO 41
- Lioré et Olivier LeO H-42
- Lioré et Olivier LeO H-43
- Lioré et Olivier LeO H-44
- Lioré et Olivier LeO 45
- Lioré et Olivier LeO H-46
- Lioré et Olivier LeO H-47
- Lioré et Olivier LeO 48
- Lioré et Olivier LeO H-49
- Lioré et Olivier LeO 50
- Lioré et Olivier LeO CL-10
- Lioré et Olivier LeO CL-11
- Lioré et Olivier LeO C-30
- Lioré et Olivier LeO C-30A/S
- Lioré et Olivier LeO C-301
- Lioré et Olivier LeO C-302
- Lioré et Olivier LeO C-34

=== LIPNUR ===
(Lembaga Industri Penerbangan Nurtanio - Nurtanio Aviation Industry Body)

- LIPNUR LT-200 Angkatang
- LIPNUR Belalang
- LIPNUR Kindjeng
- LIPNUR Kolentang
- LIPNUR Kumbang
- LIPNUR Kunang-kunang
- LIPNUR Manyang
- LIPNUR Sikumbang
- LIPNUR Super Kunang

=== Lippisch ===
- Lippisch DM.1
- Lippisch Storch I
- Lippisch Storch II
- Lippisch Storch III
- Lippisch Storch IV
- Lippisch Storch V
- Lippisch Storch VI
- Lippisch Storch VII
- Lippisch Storch VIII
- Lippisch Storch IX
- Lippisch-Espenlaub E-2
- Lippisch Ente
- Lippisch Delta I
- Lippisch Delta II
- Lippisch Delta III
- Lippisch Delta IV
- Lippisch Delta V
- Lippisch Delta VI
- Lippisch P.01-111, designed as a competitor to the Messerschmitt Me 163 Komet.
- Lippisch Li P.04-106, a tailless airplane designed as a competitor to the Messerschmitt Me 329
- Lippisch P.11, designed to compete with the Horten Ho-IX; the latter went on to become the Horten (Gotha) Ho-(Go-)229.
- Lippisch P.13 (not related to P.13a and P.13b)
- Lippisch P.13a, a unique delta-winged, ramjet-powered interceptor.
- Lippisch P.13b, a unique airplane powered by a rotating fuel-table of lignite, owing to the fuel shortages late in World War 2 in Germany.
- Lippisch P.15, a development of the Messerschmitt Me 163 Komet.
- Lippisch X-112
- Lippisch X-113
- Lippisch X-114
- Lippisch X-117

=== LISA ===
(LISA Aeronautics)

- LISA Akoya

=== Lisch ===
(Fred J Lisch, 258 Blackman, Clinton, IN)

- Lisch 1930 Biplane

=== Lisunov ===
- Lisunov Li-2

=== LITECOo ===
- LITECO Atlas

=== LiteWing Aircraft ===
(Caryville, Tennessee, United States)

- LiteWing Aircraft LiteTrike
- LiteWing Aircraft LiteWing

=== Little Wing Autogyros, Inc. ===
- Little Wing Autogyro
- Little Wing LW-1 Original proof of concept prototype
- Little Wing LW-2 Single place autogyro designed to weigh less than 254 lbs to meet United States Ultralight regulations
- Little Wing LW-3 A 70 hp covered version
- Little Wing LW-4 A two place long frame version
- Little Wing LW-5 A two place short frame version
- Little Wing Roto-Pup

=== Littoral ===
(Littoral / Abel Triou)

- Littoral E-111

=== Liuchow ===
(Liuchow Mechanical and Aircraft Factory )

- Liuchow Kwangsi Type 2
- Laville PS-89
- Liuchow Kwangsi Type 3

=== Livesey ===
(David Livesey)

- Livesey D.L.5

=== Livingston ===
(Eugene Livingston, Charlotte, NC)(aka Gene Livingston)

- Livingston 1950 Biplane
- Livingston HN Double Eagle

=== LKL ===
(Lubelski Klub Lotniczy (Lublian Aviation Club))

- LKL I
- LKL II

=== LKOD ===
(Liepājas Kara Ostas Darbnīcas) - Latvia

- LKOD KOD-1
- LKOD KOD-2
- LKOD KOD-3 - designed by Jacobs Kruze
- LKOD KOD-4 designed by Kruze and/or Atis Strazdins]
- LKOD SA-10 unlicensed copy of Svenska Aero SA-10 Piraten

=== Lloyd ===
(Ungarische Lloyd Flugzeug und Motorenfabrik AG) / (Magyar Lloyd Repülőgép és motorgyár Részvény-Társaság)

=== Company designations ===
- Lloyd B
- Lloyd C
- Lloyd FJ (Flugzeug Jäger)
- Lloyd KF 1 (Kampfflugzeug)
- Lloyd KF 2
- Lloyd LK I (Luftkreuzer)
- Lloyd LK II
- Lloyd LS 1 (built at DFW in Germany)
- Lloyd LS 2 (40.02 / Lloyd Ll 2S / Lloyd Militär Doppeldecker Nr.2) (built at DFW in Germany)

=== Military designations ===
- Lloyd C.I
- Lloyd C.II
- Lloyd C.III
- Lloyd C.IV
- Lloyd C.V
- Lloyd D.I (proposed series 45 fighter, modified 40.05)

Note: As with other austro-Hungarian aircraft manufacturers in World War I Lloyd were allocated the 40 series for prototypes and experimental aircraft.

=== Flars series numbers ===
- Lloyd 40.01 (Lloyd LS 1)
- Lloyd 40.02 (Lloyd LS 2)
- Lloyd 40.03
- Lloyd 40.04
- Lloyd 40.05
- Lloyd 40.06
- Lloyd 40.07
- Lloyd 40.08 Luftkreuzer
- Lloyd 40.09
- Lloyd 40.10
- Lloyd 40.11
- Lloyd 40.12
- Lloyd 40.13
- Lloyd 40.14
- Lloyd 40.15
- Lloyd 40.16
- Lloyd 40.17
- Lloyd 40.18
- Lloyd 40.19
- Lloyd 40.20
- Lloyd series 41 (C.I)
- Lloyd series 42 (C.II)
- Lloyd series 43 (C.III)
- Lloyd series 44 (C.IV)
- Lloyd series 44.2 (C.IV)
- Lloyd series 44.4 (C.IV)
- Lloyd series 45 (D.I)
- Lloyd series 46 (C.V)
- Lloyd series 46.5 (C.V)
- Lloyd series 47 (Aviatik C.I(Ll))
- Lloyd series 48 (Aviatik D.I(Ll))
- Lloyd series 49 (Phőnix C.I(Ll))
- Lloyd series 248 (Aviatik D.I(Ll))
- Lloyd series 348 (Aviatik D.I(Ll))

=== LMAASA ===
(Lockheed martin Aircraft Argentina SA)

- LMAASA IA 63 Pampa NG

=== LO ===
- LO 120 S

=== Load Ranger ===
- LoadRanger 2000

=== Lobet de Rouvray ===
(Lobet de Rouvray Aviation Pty. Ltd. / James Lobet & William Lobet)

- Lobet Ganagobie

=== Lockheed ===
(Lockheed Corporation) (Older name before Lockheed:Detroit)

- Lockheed Project Isinglass
- Lockheed A-9
- Lockheed A-12
- Lockheed A-28 Hudson
- Lockheed A-29 Hudson
- Lockheed AMSS (S-3 derivative)
- Lockheed AT-18
- Lockheed B-21 Raider Bomber
- Lockheed B-30
- Lockheed B-34 Lexington
- Lockheed B-37 Lexington
- Lockheed RB-69A Neptune
- Lockheed C-5 Galaxy
- Lockheed C-12 Vega
- Lockheed C-17 Super Vega
- Lockheed C-23 Altair
- Lockheed C-25 Altair
- Lockheed C-35 Electra
- Lockheed C-36 Electra
- Lockheed C-37 Electra
- Lockheed C-40 Electra
- Lockheed C-56 Lodestar
- Lockheed C-57 Lodestar
- Lockheed C-59 Lodestar
- Lockheed C-60 Lodestar
- Lockheed C-63 Hudson
- Lockheed C-66 Lodestar
- Lockheed C-69 Constellation
- Lockheed C-85 Orion
- Lockheed C-101 Vega
- Lockheed C-111 Super Electra
- Lockheed C-121 Constellation
- Lockheed C-130 Hercules
- Lockheed C-140 Jetstar
- Lockheed C-141 Starlifter
- Lockheed CP-140 Aurora
- Lockheed CP-140A Arcturus
- Lockheed EC-121 Warning Star
- Lockheed EC-130V Hercules
- Lockheed ER-2
- Lockheed F-4 Lightning
- Lockheed F-5 Lightning
- Lockheed F-12
- Lockheed F-14 Shooting Star
- Lockheed F-80 shooting Star
- Lockheed F-90
- Lockheed F-94 Starfire
- Lockheed F-97 Starfire
- Lockheed F-104 Starfighter
- Lockheed NF-104A
- Lockheed F-117A Nighthawk
- Lockheed FM-2
- Lockheed FO Lightning
- Lockheed FV Salmon
- Lockheed GV
- Lockheed H-51
- Lockheed AH-56 Cheyenne
- Lockheed JO Electra Junior
- Lockheed O-3
- Lockheed P-2 Neptune
- Lockheed P-3 Orion
- Lockheed P-3 Orion AEW&C
- Lockheed P-7
- Lockheed P-24
- Lockheed P-38 Lightning
- Lockheed P-49
- Lockheed P-58 Chain Lightning
- Lockheed P-80 Shooting Star
- Lockheed PB-3
- Lockheed PBO
- Lockheed PO Warning Star
- Lockheed PO-2W
- Lockheed PV-1 Ventura
- Lockheed PV-2 Harpoon
- Lockheed P2V Neptune
- Lockheed P3V Orion
- Lockheed RO Altair
- Lockheed R2O Electra
- Lockheed R3O Electra Junior
- Lockheed R4O Super Electra
- Lockheed R5O Lodestar
- Lockheed R6O Constitution
- Lockheed R6V Constitution
- Lockheed R7O Constellation
- Lockheed R7V Constellation
- Lockheed S-3 Viking
- Lockheed SR-71 Blackbird
- Lockheed T-1 Seastar
- Lockheed T-33 Shooting Star
- Lockheed T2V SeaStar
- Lockheed TO Shooting Star
- Lockheed TR-1
- Lockheed TV Shooting Star
- Lockheed U-2
- Lockheed UV
- Lockheed XV-4 Hummingbird
- Lockheed VZ-10 Hummingbird
- Lockheed WV Warning Star
- Lockheed WV-2
- Lockheed X-7
- Lockheed X-26 Frigate
- Lockheed X-27 Lancer
- Lockheed XP-900
- Lockheed YF-12
- Lockheed A-11 (A - Archangel - not military)
- Lockheed A-12 (A - Archangel - not military)
- Lockheed L-1 Vega
- Lockheed L-2 Vega
- Lockheed L-3 Air Express
- Lockheed L-4 Explorer
- Lockheed L-5 Vega
- Lockheed L-7 Explorer
- Lockheed L-8 Altair
- Lockheed L-8 Sirius
- Lockheed L-9 Orion
- Lockheed L-10 Electra
- Lockheed L-012 Electra Junior
- Lockheed L-212
- Lockheed L-014 Super Electra
- Lockheed B-14 (not US military designation)
- Lockheed L-414
- Lockheed L-018 Lodestar
- Lockheed L-022 Lightning
- Lockheed L-122 Lightning
- Lockheed L-222 Lightning
- Lockheed L-322 Lightning
- Lockheed L-422 Lightning
- Lockheed L-026 Neptune
- Lockheed L-126 Neptune
- Lockheed L-226 Neptune
- Lockheed L-326 Neptune
- Lockheed L-426 Neptune
- Lockheed L-526 Neptune
- Lockheed L-626 Neptune
- Lockheed L-726 Neptune
- Lockheed L-033 Little Dipper
- Lockheed L-034 Big Dipper
- Lockheed L-037 Ventura
- Lockheed L-049 Constellation
- Lockheed L-149 Constellation
- Lockheed L-549 Constellation
- Lockheed L-649 Constellation
- Lockheed L-749 Constellation
- Lockheed L-1049 Super Constellation
- Lockheed L-1249 Super Constellation
- Lockheed L-1649 Starliner
- Lockheed L-080 Shooting Star
- Lockheed L-780 Starfire
- Lockheed L-090
- Lockheed L-100 Hercules
- Lockheed L-133
- Lockheed L-140
- Lockheed L-141
- Lockheed L-186
- Lockheed L-188 Starfire
- Lockheed L-188 Electra
- Lockheed L-245
- Lockheed L-286
- Lockheed L-301
- Lockheed L-402
- Lockheed L-1011 TriStar
- Lockheed L-2000
- Lockheed L-7000
- Lockheed Aerogyro
- Lockheed Air Express
- Lockheed Air Trooper
- Lockheed Altair
- Lockheed Big Dipper
- Lockheed CL-282
- Lockheed CL-288
- Lockheed CL-329 Jetstar
- Lockheed CL-400 Project Suntan
- Lockheed CL-475
- Lockheed CL-500
- Lockheed CL-595 Aerogyro
- Lockheed CL-823
- Lockheed CL-915
- Lockheed CL-1200 Lancer
- Lockheed CL-1600
- Lockheed CL-1980
- Lockheed Big Dipper
- Lockheed Constellation
- Lockheed D-21
- Lockheed Electra (1930s)
- Lockheed Electra (1950s)
- Lockheed Electra Junior
- Lockheed Explorer
- Lockheed Flatbed
- Lockheed Have Blue
- Lockheed Hudson
- Lockheed JetStar
- Lockheed JetStar One
- Lockheed KXL1
- Lockheed Little Dipper
- Lockheed Lodestar
- Lockheed Martin CFO
- Lockheed Orion (1930s)
- Lockheed Orion (1960s)
- Lockheed Q-Star
- Lockheed QT-2
- Lockheed Saturn
- Lockheed Sirius
- Lockheed Starliner
- Lockheed Super Constellation
- Lockheed Super Dipper
- Lockheed Super Electra
- Lockheed TriStar
- Lockheed Vega
- Lockheed XFV
- Lockheed/Canadair CF-104 Starfighter Canadian Armed Forces
- Lockheed/Canadair CP-122 Neptune Canadian Armed Forces
- Lockheed/Canadair CP-140 Aurora Canadian Armed Forces
- Lockheed/Canadair CP-140A Arcturus Canadian Armed Forces
- Lockheed/Canadair CT-133 Silver Star Canadian Armed Forces
- Lockheed/Tachikawa Army Type LO Transport

=== Lockheed Martin ===
- Lockheed Martin Aerial Common Sensor
- Lockheed Martin F-22 Raptor
- Lockheed Martin F-35 Lightning II
- Lockheed Martin RQ-3 Dark Star
- Lockheed Martin SR-72
- Lockheed Martin VentureStar
- Lockheed Martin X-33
- Lockheed Martin X-35
- Lockheed Martin X-44A UAV revealed March 2018
- Lockheed Martin X-44 MANTA cancelled project (spoof designation)
- Lockheed Martin Polecat
- Lockheed Martin RQ-170 Sentinel Beast of Kandahar

=== Lockspeiser ===
(Lockspeiser Aircraft Ltd. / David Lockspeiser)

- Lockspeiser LDA-01

=== Lockwood ===
- Lockwood Aircam
- Lockwood Drifter

=== Locomotive ===
(Locomotive Terminal Improvement Co, Barrington, IL)

- Locomotive Chicago Javelin (a.k.a.Mulzer Locomotive)

=== Loehle ===
(Loehle Enterprises, Wartrace, TN: Also Loehle Aviation Inc, Loehle Aircraft Corp.)

- Loehle 5151
- Loehle P-40
- Loehle Spitfire Elite
- Loehle Sport Parasol
- Loehle Spad XIII
- Loehle SE. 5a
- Loehle Fokker D.VII

=== Loening ===
(1913: Grover Loening. 1917: Loening Aeronautical Engineering Co, 31 St at East River, New York, NY, 1928: Merged with Keystone Aircraft Corp as Loening Aeronautical Div. 1929: Loening Aeronautical Engineering Co, Garden City, NY)

- Loening COA-1
- Loening FL USN fighter cancelled
- Loening HL
- Loening LS
- Loening O-10
- Loening OA-1
- Loening OA-2
- Loening OL
- Loening O2L
- Loening PA-1 "pursuit Air-cooled"
- Loening PW-2 "pursuit Water-cooled"
- Loening R-4
- Loening SL
- Loening S2L
- Loening-Milling 1912
- Loening 1911 monoplane flying boat
- Loening 1917
- Loening S-1 (Air Yacht 1922)
- Loening Amphibian 1923
- Loening C-1
- Loening C-2 (Air Yacht 1928)
- Loening C-4
- Loening C-5
- Loening C-6
- Loening Duckling 1918
- Loening Duckling 1929
- Loening M-1
- Loening M-2 Kitten
- Loening M-3
- Loening M-8
- Loening M-8-0
- Loening M-8-1
- Loening Monoduck

=== Lofland ===
(W J Lofland Aircraft Co, Detroit, MI)

- Lofland 1931 Biplane

=== Logistik-Technik ===
(Logistik-Technik u. Design GmbH (known as LTD), Baindt, Germany)

- LTD LO-120S

=== Lohner ===
(Lohnerwerke GmbH / Jakob Lohner)

- Lohner AA (10.20 / 111)
- Lohner AB (112)
- Lohner AC (10.23)
- Lohner A (111.04 / Dr.I)
- Lohner B
- Lohner C
- Lohner D
- Lohner E
- Lohner G
- Lohner H
- Lohner H2
- Lohner J
- Lohner Jc
- Lohner Jcr
- Lohner L (L40-L45)
- Lohner M Rennboot Nordenflug (E17-E21, L16)
- Lohner MK (M31, M39)
- Lohner Mkn (R1-R2)
- Lohner Mn bzw.M2 (E33-E38)
- Lohner P (R28-R30, S.1-S.6)
- Lohner R (R1-R29) 1918
- Lohner S
- Lohner T (L5, L46-L51, L52-L57) 1915
- Lohner Te L58-L69, L90-L119) 1916
- Lohner TI (L120-L143, R1-R24, R25-R48) 1916
- Lohner U
- Lohner X (K300) 1916
- Lohner Z
- Lohner B.I (series 11)
- Lohner B.II
- Lohner B.III
- Lohner B.IV
- Lohner B.V
- Lohner B.VI
- Lohner B.VII
- Lohner C.I
- Lohner C.II
- Lohner Dr.I (Lohner 111.04 / Type A / 10.20)
- Lohner D.I (Lohner 111 / Type AA / 10.20)

Note: The Lohner 10 series is mostly composed of distinct aircraft, with several variants and prototypes of the Pfeilflieger.

- Lohner 10.01
- Lohner 10.02
- Lohner 10.03
- Lohner 10.04
- Lohner 10.05
- Lohner 10.06
- Lohner 10.07
- Lohner 10.08 re-designated Taube
- Lohner 10.09 re-designated Taube
- Lohner 10.10 re-designated Taube
- Lohner 10.10 new Pfeilflieger
- Lohner 10.11 re-designated Taube
- Lohner 10.12 formerly Gebirgsflieger Type C
- Lohner 10.13 second gebirgsflieger
- Lohner 10.14 formerly Meeting Apparat 1914
- Lohner 10.15 Schichtpreis Eindecker Type 1914
- Lohner 10.16
- Lohner 10.17
- Lohner 10.18
- Lohner 10.19 (Lohner C.II series 112.01)
- Lohner 10.20A (Lohner D.I / series 111 / Type AA) SPUCKERL?
- Lohner 10.20B (Lohner D.I / series 111 / Type AA) SPUCKERL?
- Lohner 10.21 (Type U) (formerly Type U twin engined bomber)
- Lohner 10.21 (Type F) Ferkundungs Flugzeug
- Lohner 10.22 second Ferkundungs Flugzeug
- Lohner 10.23 (Type AC)
- Lohner 10.28
- Lohner series 11 (Lohner B.I / Type B)
- Lohner series 12 (Lohner B.II / Type C)
- Lohner series 12.4 (Lohner B.II(U))
- Lohner series 13 (Lohner B.III / Type D)
- Lohner series 14 (Lohner B.III / Type E)
- Lohner series 14.5 (Lohner B.III(U))
- Lohner series 15 (Lohner B.IV / Type G)
- Lohner series 15.5 (Lohner B.IV(U))
- Lohner series 16 (Lohner B.V / Type H)
- Lohner series 16.1 (Lohner B.VI / Type H2)
- Lohner series 17 (Lohner B.VII / Type J)
- Lohner series 17.3 (Lohner B.VII)
- Lohner series 17.5 (Lohner B.VII(U))
- Lohner series 17.8 (Lohner B.VII / re-engined series 17 aircraft)
- Lohner series 18 (Lohner C.I / Type Jc)
- Lohner series 18.5 (Lohner C.I / Type Jcr)
- Lohner series 111 (Lohner D.I / Type AA / 10.20)
- Lohner series 112 (Lohner C.II / Type AB)
- Lohner-Etrich Renn Gebirgs (racer-mountain) (AD 127 and AD 354)
- Lohner-Daimler 1910 Pfeilflieger Pfeilflieger (arrow flier)
- Lohner-Daimler 1911 Pfeilflieger
- Lohner 1912 Pfeilflieger
- Lohner 1913 Pfeilflieger
- Lohner Parasol (AD 426)
- Lohner Marineflieger III
- Lohner Warnemunde (L32) (Others have this as a Model 'T')
- Lohner Nr5 (L.5) 1913
- Lohner Nr6
- Lohner Etrich/Mickl (E16)

=== Loire ===
(Ateliers et Chantiers de la Loire)

- Loire 11
- Loire 30
- Loire 40 1928 C.1
- Loire 41 1928 C.1
- Loire 42 1928 C.1
- Loire 43
- Loire 45
- Loire 46
- Loire 50
- Loire 60
- Loire 70
- Loire 102 Bretagne
- Loire 130
- Loire 210
- Loire 250
- Loire 301
- Loire 501
- Loire 601

=== Loire-Nieuport ===
- Loire-Nieuport LN.10 - twin engine floatplane (1939)
- Loire-Nieuport LN.140
- Loire-Nieuport LN.161
- Loire-Nieuport LN.40
- Loire-Nieuport LN.41
- Loire-Nieuport LN.401
- Loire-Nieuport LN.402
- Loire-Nieuport LN.411
- Loire-Nieuport LN.42

=== Lombarda ===
(Aeronautica Lombarda S.A.)

- Lombarda A.L. 12P
- Lombarda A.L.T.
- Pedaliante B.B. (Bossi-Bonomi HPA)

=== Lombardi ===
(Francis Lombardi) - (Azionaria Vercellese Industrie Aeronautiche q.v.)

- Lombardi FL.3
- Lombardi L.4
- Lombardi LM.5
- Lombardi LM.7

=== London and Provincial ===
(London and Provincial Aviation Company)

- London and Provincial Fuselage Biplane
- London and Provincial School Biplane

=== Lonek ===
(Jaroslav Lonek)

- Lonek L-1 lump
- Lonek L-4
- Lonek L-5
- Lonek L-8 Ginette

=== Long ===
(Leslie Long, Cornelius and Beaverton, OR)

- Long Anzani Longster (a.k.a.AL-1)
- Long Henderson Longster (a.k.a.HL-1)
- Long Low-Wing Longster

=== Long ===
(David E Long, Lock Haven, PA)

- Long Midget Mustang

=== Long-Ralston ===
(Leslie Long & "Swede" Ralston, Cornelius, OR)

- Long-Ralston Wimpy (a.k.a. W)

=== Longfellow ===
(Longfellow Monoplane Company, Allston, Boston, MA)

- Longfellow 1911 monoplane (Bleriot type) powered by an Avis 30 hp., 2 cyl., 2 cycle revolving engine with a weight of 79 lbs.

=== Longmire ===
(D Lev Longmire, Albuquerque, NM)

- Longmire Model A
- Longmire Shady Lady

=== Longren ===
(1911: Albin K. Longren. 1920: Longren Aircraft Co, Cessna Airport, Topeka, KS, 1924: Filed bankruptcy, sold rights and equipment to Alexander Film Co. 1939: Longren Aircraft Co, Torrance, CA)

- Longren 1912 Biplane
- Longren 1914 Biplane
- Longren 1916 Biplane
- Longren AK (a.k.a. Fibre sport Plna or New longren Sport or Commercial - USAAS Longren L-3)
- Longren D-2
- Longren G
- Longren H (H-2)
- Longren H-2
- Longren LH
- Longren LAK
- Longren NL-13
- Longren Topeka

=== Longren ===
(Longren Aircraft Co, Torrance, CA)

- Longren Centaur

=== Lookout Mountain Flight Park ===
(Rising Fawn, GA)

- Lookout Mountain SkyCycle

=== Looney ===
(William E Looney, Detroit, MI)

- Looney Welco

=== Loose ===
(George H Loose Co, Redwood City, CA)

- Loose 1909 Monoplane
- Loose 1910 Monoplane
- Loose 1911 Biplane

=== Loose ===
(Chester Loose, Davenport, IA)

- Loose 1930 Monoplane
- Loose 1933 Monoplane
- Loose Racer
- Loose Special
- Loose-Siem Special (a.k.a. Townsend Special)

=== LoPresti ===
(Curt and Jim LoPresti )

- LoPresti Sharkfire

=== LoPresti ===
(LeRoy P LoPresti. LoPresti-Piper Aircraft Engr Co, Vero Beach, FL)

- LoPresti LP-1 Swiftfury
- LoPresti Swiftfire

=== Loral ===
- Loral GZ-22

=== Loravia ===
- Loravai KV.2
- Loravai KV.3A
- Loravai KV.4
- Loravai KV.5

=== Loring ===
(Talleres Loring / Dr. Jorge Loring)

- Loring Reconocimiento (1919)
- Loring R-I
- Loring R-II
- Loring R-III
- Loring C.I
- Loring B.I
- Loring T.I
- Loring E.II La Pepa
- Loring-Barrón Colonial Trimotor
- Loring X

=== Lorraine Hanriot ===
See: Hanriot

=== Loudenclos ===
(Edward Loudenclos, San Francisco, CA)

- Loudenclos 1912 Biplane
- Loudenclos 1912 Monoplane

=== Loudenslager ===
(Leo Loudenslager)

- Loudenslager Laser 200

=== Loughead ===
(Alco (Alco Cab Co, principal investor) Hydroaeroplane Co, San Francisco, CA, 1916: (Allan and Malcolm) Loughead Aircraft Mfg Co, Santa Barbara, CA)

- Loughead F-1
- Loughead G
- Loughead HS-2L1
- Loughead S-1 Sport

=== Lovejoy ===
(D. Barr Peat and Kenneth “Curly” Lovejoy)

- Lovejoy Curlycraft (Heinz backed)

=== Loveland ===
(A D Loveland, Milwaukee, WI)

- Loveland Experimental

=== Loving ===
(Neal Loving, Wayne University, Detroit, MI)

- Loving WR-1 Love
- Loving WR-2

=== Lowe ===
- Lowe Marlburian

=== L.T.G. ===
(Luft Torpedo Gesellschaft)

- L.T.G. SD 1
- L.T.G. FD 1

=== LTV ===
(1960: Merger of Ling Electronics and TEMCO as Ling-Temco Electronics Inc. 1961: Merged with Chance Vought Corp as Ling-Temco-Vought Inc. 1965: LTV Aerospace. 1976: Vought Corp. 1986: LTV Aircraft Products Group. 1990: LTV Aerospace and Defense Co. )

- LTV A-7 Corsair II
- LTV C-142
- LTV L450F

=== Lualdi-Tassotti ===
See:Aer Lualdi

=== Lübeck-Travemünde ===
(Flugzeugwerft Lübeck-Travemünde G.m.b.H.)

- Lübeck-Travemünde F 1
- Lübeck-Travemünde F 2
- Lübeck-Travemünde F 4
- Lübeck-Travemünde No. 844

=== Lublin (Plage i Laśkiewicz) ===
(Zaklady Mechaniczne E.Plage i T. Laśkiewicz - E.Plage & T.Laśkiewicz Engineering Establishment)

- Lublin R-VIII
- Lublin R-IX
- Lublin R-X
- Lublin R-XI
- Lublin R-XII
- Lublin R-XIII
- Lublin R-XIV
- Lublin R-XVI
- Lublin R-XVII
- Lublin R-XVIII
- Lublin R-XX

=== Lucas ===
(Avions Émile Lucas, Lagny-le-Sec, France)

- Lucas L4 Baby Lucas
- Lucas L5
- Lucas L6
- Lucas L6A
- Lucas L6B
- Lucas L6-7
- Lucas L7
- Lucas L8
- Lucas L10
- Lucas L11
- Lucas L12

=== Ludington ===
(1922: Ludington Exhibition Co (founders: Charles Townsend Ludington & Wallace Kellett), Pine Valley, NJ, 1926: Ludington Philadelphia Flying Service, Philadelphia, PA)

- Ludington Farman Sport
- Ludington Chamberlain Biplane
- Ludington Miller Lizette

=== Ludington-Griswold ===
((C Townsend) Ludington - (Roger) Griswold Aircraft Co, CT)

- Ludington-Griswold 1944 two-seater Monoplane
- Ludington-Griswold 1944 four-seater Monoplane

=== Ludlow ===
(Israel Ludlow, Jamestown, OH or Norfolk, VA)

- Ludlow 1905 Biplane
- Ludlow 1907 Aeroplane
- Ludlow 1908 Aeroiplane
- Ludlow Multiplane

=== Lundgren ===
(Earl Lundgren. )

- Lundgren 1911 Monoplane

=== Lundy-Kotula ===
(Brian Lundy & Steve Kotula, Salt Lake City/Midwale, UT)

- Lundy-Kotula Graflite

=== Luscombe ===
(Luscombe Airplane Co, Kansas City MO)

- Luscombe 1 Phantom
- Luscombe 4
- Luscombe 8 Silvaire (a.k.a.Silvaire-Luscombe 8F a.k.a. TEMCO Luscombe 8F)
- Luscombe 9
- Luscombe 10
- Luscombe 11A Silvaire Sedan
- Luscombe 50
- Luscombe 90
- Luscombe C-90
- Luscombe Gullwing (aka Weatherly-Campbell Colt or Wiggins Colt 460)
- Luscombe Phantom
- Luscombe Sixty-Five
- Luscombe Sprite

=== Luscombe ===
(Luscombe Aircraft (Pres: John Daniel), Altus, OK)

- Luscombe 11E Spartan

=== Lush ===
- Lush VVA-1

=== Luton ===
(Luton Aircraft)

- Luton L.A.2
- Luton L.A.3 Minor
- Luton L.A.4 Minor
- Luton L.A.5 Major
- Luton Buzzard

=== Luyties ===
(Otto Luyties)

- luyties 1907 Helicopter

=== LVG ===
(Luft-Verkehrs Gesellschaft m.b.H. Johannisthal)

- LVG B.I
- LVG B.II
- LVG B.III
- LVG C.I
- LVG C.II
- LVG C.III
- LVG C.IV
- LVG C.V
- LVG C.VI
- LVG C.VIII
- LVG C.IX
- LVG C.VIII
- LVG D.II
- LVG D.III
- LVG D.IV
- LVG D.V
- LVG D.VI
- LVG E.I
- LVG G.I
- LVG G.II
- LVG G.III
- LVG W.I
- LVG D 4
- LVG D 10
- LVG D 12 (D.II)
- LVG P.I
- LVG P.II
- LVG D 12

=== LWD ===
(Lotnicze Warsztaty Doświadczalne - experimental aviation workshops)

- LWD Junak
- LWD Junak-3
- LWD Żak
- LWD Szpak-4
- LWD Żuraw
- LWD Zuch
- LWD Bies
- LWD Goniec
- LWD Miś
- LWD Skrzat
- LWD Upiór

=== LWF ===
(1915: Lowe, Willard & Fowler Engineering Company (Robert G Fowler, Edward Lowe Jr, Charles Willard), Long Island, NY, then College Point, NY, 1916: Reorganized, after principals had left, by New York City investment company as L-W-F Engineering Co Inc.)

- LWF Butterfly
- LWF SDW-1 (Douglas DT-2 / Wright SDW-1)
- LWF model F
- LWF model G
- LWF model G-2
- LWF HS-2L (Curtiss HS-2L)
- LWF Model H Owl
- LWF model J-2 (Twin DH)
- LWF MO-1
- LWF NBS-1
- LWF NBS-2
- LWF Reconnaissance
- LWF T-3
- LWF model V

=== LWS ===
(Lubelska Wytwórnia Samolotów - Lublin aircraft factory)

- LWS-1
- LWS-2
- LWS-3 Mewa
- LWS-4
- LWS-5
- LWS-6 Żubr
- LWS-7 Mewa II
