= Lloyd C.II =

Lloyd C.II–C.IV
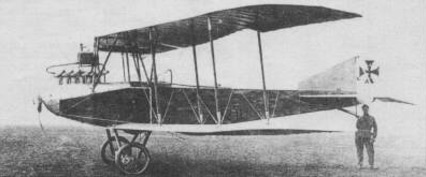
- Lloyd C.II

General information
- Type: Reconnaissance aircraft
- National origin: Austria-Hungary
- Manufacturer: Ungarische Lloyd Flugzeug und Motorenfabrik AG / Magyar Lloyd Repülőgép és motorgyár Részvény-Társaság
- Primary user: KuKLFT
- Number built: 100 × C.II ca. 50 × C.III ca. 40 × C.IV

History
- First flight: 1915

The Lloyd C.II and its derivatives, the C.III and C.IV were reconnaissance aircraft produced in Austria-Hungary during the First World War. They were based on the Lloyd company's pre-war C.I design, and like it, were conventional biplanes with swept-back wings.

== Design and development ==
After the outbreak of World War I, the original aircraft was refined somewhat by Lloyd designers Wizina and von Melczer, featuring a reduced wingspan and wing area but increased weight. An 8 mm Schwarzlose machine gun was added on a semi-circular mount for an observer.

Beginning in 1915, one hundred examples of this type were built – fifty by Lloyd at their plant in Aszód, and another fifty by WKF in Vienna.

Apart from their service with the Austro-Hungarian flying service, ten C.IIs saw service with Poland. These were captured in Malopolska in November 1918 and were used as trainers until being withdrawn from service in 1920.

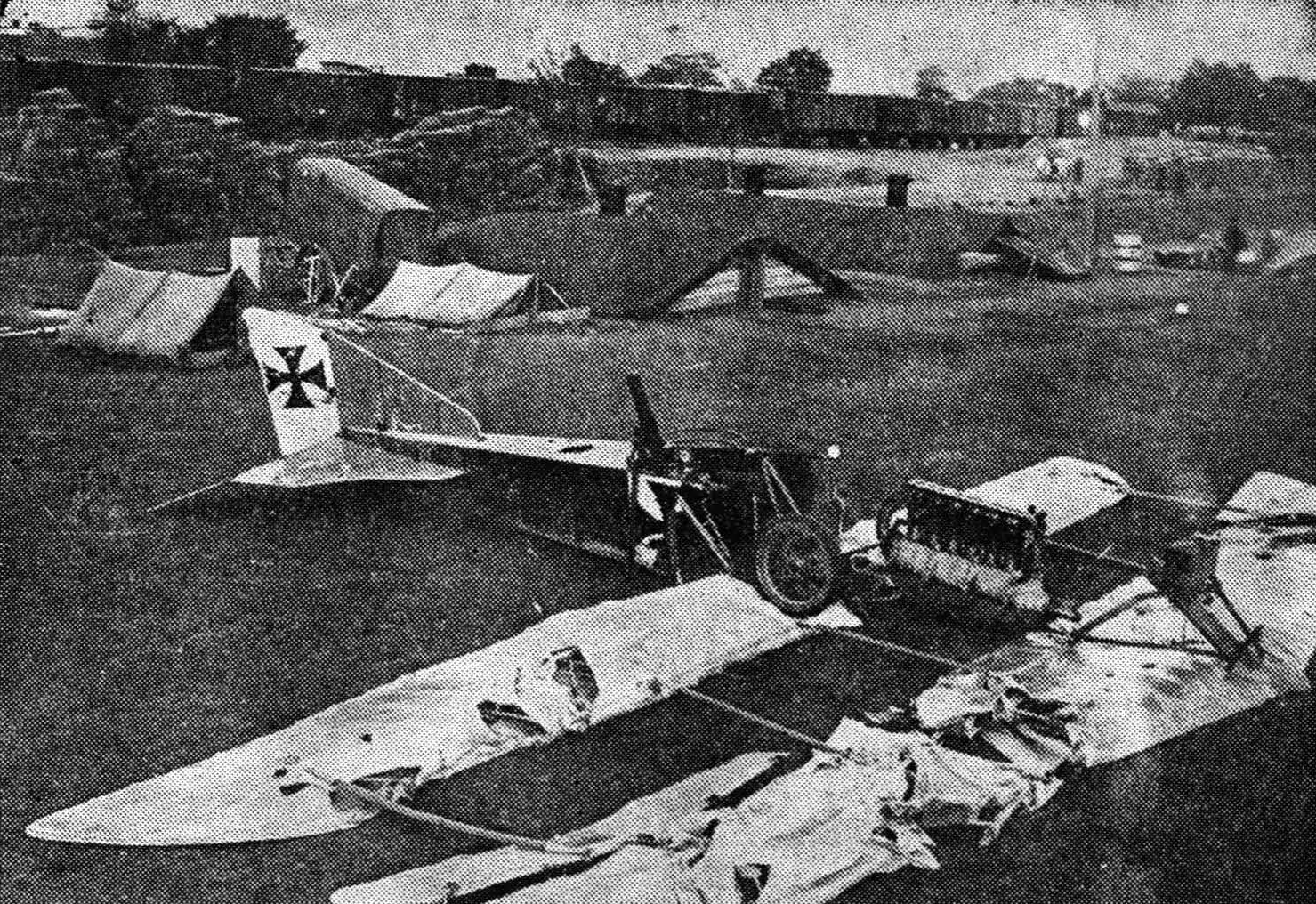
A C.III shot down in Romania

The C.III was almost identical except for the use of a 120 kW (160 hp) Austro-Daimler engine, which increased the top speed to 133 km/h (83 mph). Production again was by both Lloyd and WKF, with total production amounting to 50-60 machines.

The C.IV also used the Austro-Daimler engine, and small batches were produced by both Lloyd and WKF.

== Variants ==
- C.II with Heiro engine and 14.00 m wingspan (100 built)
- C.III with Austro-Daimler engine and 14.00 m wingspan (8 or 16 built by Lloyd, 43 by WKF)
- C.IV with Austro-Daimler engine produced by Lloyd with 14.52 m (47 ft 8 in) wingspan (47 built, plus one converted)

== Operators ==
Austria-Hungary

- KuKLFT

== Specifications (C.II) ==
Data from Grosz 2002, German & Austro-Hungarian Aircraft Manufacturers 1908 - 1918

General characteristics

- Crew: 2
- Length: 8.8 m (28 ft 10 in)
- Upper wingspan: 14.8 m (48 ft 7 in)
- Lower wingspan: 13.8 m (45 ft 3 in)
- Height: 3.15 m (10 ft 4 in)
- Wing area: 38.0 m^{2} (409 sq ft)
- Empty weight: 900 kg (1,984 lb)
- Gross weight: 1,329 kg (2,930 lb)
- Powerplant: 1 × Hiero (Mar) 6-cyl. water-cooled in-line piston engine, 108 kW (145 hp)

Performance

- Maximum speed: 128 km/h (80 mph, 69 kn)
- Range: 400 km (250 mi, 220 nmi)
- Service ceiling: 3,000 m (9,800 ft)
- Rate of climb: 5.6 m/s (1,100 ft/min)

Armament
One 8 mm (0.315 in) Schwarzlose machine gun in the observers position, mounted on a rail.

- 90 kg (198 lb) of bombs
