= Lloyd C.V =

1910s Austro Hungarian reconnaissance aircraft

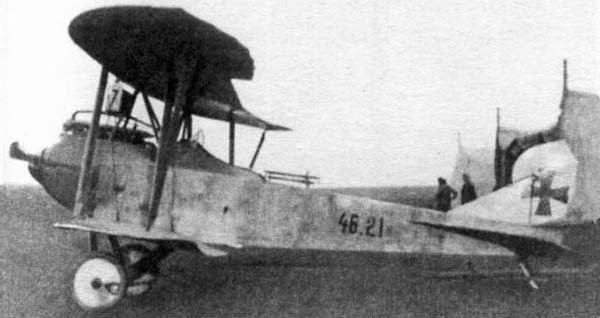
- Lloyd C.V

General information
- Type: Reconnaissance aircraft
- National origin: Austria-Hungary
- Manufacturer: Lloyd
- Primary user: KuKLFT
- Number built: 144

History
- First flight: 1917

The Lloyd C.V was a reconnaissance aircraft produced in Austria-Hungary during the First World War. It was a departure from Lloyd's previous reconnaissance types, which had all been based on a pre-war design. The C.V was a more compact and streamlined aircraft with an unusual wing structure.

== Design and development ==
In spring 1916, Tibor von Melczer, chief designer of the Austro-Hungarian aircraft manufacturer Lloyd, began work on a new reconnaissance aircraft, which differed from Lloyd's previous production types as it was not closely based on German Deutsche Flugzeug-Werke (DFW) designs. The new design was smaller than the DFW-based designs, and careful attention to drag and weight reduction significantly increased performance. The design was largely conventional overall, except for the interplane struts. These were arranged in two sets, front and rear, with the rear sets consisting of two struts per wing, and the forward sets of only one strut per wing. When viewed from the front of the aircraft, rather than standing vertically, the rear struts formed a V-shape, converging to the point where they met the lower wings. From bottom wing to top, the single forward struts sloped inwards towards the centreline, matching the angle of the inboard rear struts. The fin was triangular and similar to the unit on earlier Lloyd designs, but featured an extension at the top of the rudder that reached over the top of the fixed part of the fin. With its curved leading edge and scalloped trailing edge, this rudder resembled the tail of a rooster, and gained the aircraft the nickname Kikeriki (German: "Cock-a-doodle-doo").

The wings departed from the usual structure of one or more spars surrounded by airfoil-shaped ribs and were built instead from ribs surrounded by longerons that stretched span-wise along the wings. This was all then covered in plywood sheeting. While this made for a strong, light structure, it also meant that repairs to damaged wings were difficult, and proved impossible to carry out in the field - damaged aircraft instead being sent back to depots for exchange. Another problem was identified in that moisture trapped inside the wings could have no way to escape easily and would cause the plywood skin to buckle or even delaminate.

Lloyd built 96 C.Vs in 1917, powered by Austro-Daimler engines, while WKF built another 48 with Benz engines. The type saw only brief front-line service before being relegated to secondary duties. A number of continued in service after the war with the military forces of Poland, Hungary, and Ukraine.

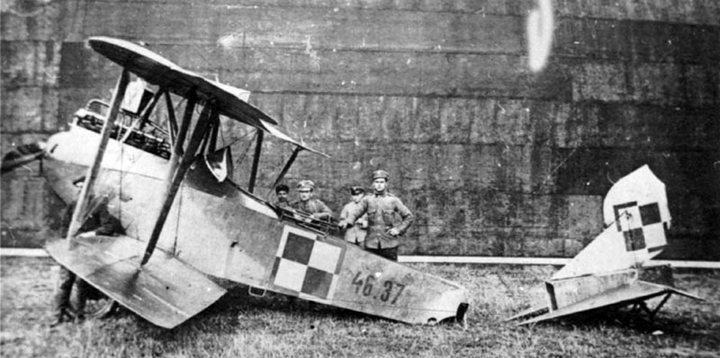
Damaged Lloyd C.V

== Variants ==
- C.Vs built by Lloyd with Austro-Daimler engine (96 built)
- C.Vs built by WKF with Benz engine (48 built)

== Operators ==
Austria-Hungary

- Austro-Hungarian Imperial and Royal Aviation Troops

Poland

- Polish Air Force operated six aircraft (1918–1919), nicknamed Fornir ("Veneer").

Ukrainian People's Republic

- Ukrainian People's Republic Air Fleet

Hungary

- Hungarian Air Force (postwar)

== Specifications (Series 46, Daimler 185 hp) ==
Data from Austro-Hungarian Army Aircraft of World War One

General characteristics

- Crew: Two, pilot and observer
- Length: 7.22 m (23 ft 8 in)
- Upper wingspan: 11.19 m (36 ft 9 in)
- Lower wingspan: 11.00 m (36 ft 1 in)
- Height: 3.00 m (9 ft 10 in)
- Wing area: 27.63 m^{2} (297.4 sq ft)
- Empty weight: 860 kg (1,895 lb)
- Gross weight: 1,125 kg (2,480 lb)
- Powerplant: 1 × Austro-Daimler 6 six-cylinder water-cooled inline piston engine , 138 kW (185 hp)

Performance

- Maximum speed: 165 km/h (103 mph, 89 kn)
- Endurance: 2 hr
- Time to altitude:
  - 4 min 15 to 1,000 m (3,300 ft)
  - 17 min to 3,000 m (9,800 ft)
  - 40 min to 4,600 m (15,100 ft)

Armament

- 1 × trainable 8 mm Schwarzlose machine gun for observer
- 1 × fixed, forward-firing 8 mm Schwarzlose machine gun in overwing Type II VK gunpod
- 50 kg (110 lb) of bombs (in place of observer)

== See also ==
Aircraft of comparable role, configuration, and era

- DFW B.I
