= Lloyd 40.15 =

General information
- Type: Fighter
- Manufacturer: Ungarische Lloyd Flugzeug und Motorenfabrik
- Status: Prototype
- Primary user: Austro-Hungarian Empire
- Number built: 1

History
- First flight: December 1917

The Lloyd 40.15 was an experimental triplane fighter that was designed and built in the Austro-Hungarian Empire during World War I.

== Specifications (Lloyd 40.15) ==
Data from

General characteristics

- Crew: 1
- Length: 7.1 m (23 ft 4 in)
- Upper wingspan: 7.6 m (24 ft 11 in)
- Mid wingspan: 5.8 m (19 ft 0 in)
- Lower wingspan: 4.2 m (13 ft 9 in)
- Height: 2.82 m (9 ft 3 in)
- Wing area: 22.2 m^{2} (239 sq ft)
- Gross weight: 900 kg (1,984 lb)
- Powerplant: 1 × Austro-Daimler 185hp 6-cylinder water-cooled in-line piston engine, 138 kW (185 hp)

Performance

- Maximum speed: 160 km/h (99 mph, 86 kn) estimated

Armament

- Guns: 2 × fixed, forward-firing 8 mm (0.315 in) Schwarzlose machine guns
