= LM-5 =

LM-5, LM.5 or LM5 may refer to:

- Light Miniature Aircraft LM-5, American ultralight aircraft design
- Lombardi LM.5, an Italian light aircraft design
- LM5 (album), a 2018 album by Little Mix
- Long March 5, Chinese heavy lift launch system
- LM-5 Eagle, the Apollo 11 Lunar Module, named Eagle, the first to land humans on the Moon
- Vektor LM5, assault rifle
