= Lohner B.II =

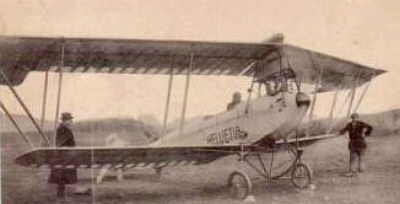

General information
- Type: Reconnaissance aircraft
- National origin: Austria-Hungary
- Manufacturer: Lohner
- Primary user: KuKLFT

The Lohner B.II (originally designated Type C) was a military reconnaissance aircraft produced in Austria-Hungary during World War I. It was a development of the pre-war B.I design, incorporating changes requested by the Austro-Hungarian army, but inheriting its predecessor's basic design, including its characteristic swept-back wings.

== Design and development ==
Intended to perform better in the mountainous terrain of the Austrian alps, the Type C featured a longer fuselage, greater wingspan, and strengthened undercarriage. The Type B's Austro-Daimler engine was exchanged for a Hiero with slightly less power but also much lighter. The extended wingspan soon led to problems, however, when the prototype's wings collapsed under stress testing. A second prototype, with strengthened wings, was accepted by the Army in August 1913, and placed an order for another 24 aircraft. Soon after deliveries began, the wings of a Type C failed in flight, and all examples were grounded. Work to strengthen the wing design was carried out under the direction of Professor Richard Knoller but this was not yet complete when war broke out. Six Type Cs were immediately put back into action, with the grounding of the others being lifted shortly afterwards. The design proved too slow and too fragile for operational service, and was quickly reassigned to secondary roles. In February 1915, the Luftschiffabteilung revised its designation system to match that in use by Germany, and the Type C was redesignated B.II. Later the same year, a new and strengthened wing was fitted to all remaining B.IIs, and the B.II (along with the B.I) was put back into production under licence at Flugzeugwerk Fischamend for use as trainers.

As the year drew on, the B.III, B.IV, B.V, and B.VI followed, featuring a variety of engines. None were produced in quantity, but the B.III and B.IV were also built by the new Ufag firm that had been established to produce these Lohner designs in Albertfalva in Budapest. Further development eventually resulted in the Lohner B.VII by the end of the year.

== Variants ==
B.II
Lohner Type C:production version with 63 kW (85 hp) Hiero engine (96 built)
B.II(U)
Series 12.4, production by UFAG (Ungarische Flugzeugfabrik Abteil Gesellschaft / Ungarische Flugzeugwerke Aktien Gesellschaft): 18 built.
B.III
Lohner Type E: version with 75 kW (100 hp) Mercedes, 90 kW (120 hp) Austro-Daimler
B.III(U)
Series 14.5: production by UFAG (Ungarische Flugzeugfabrik Abteil Gesellschaft / Ungarische Flugzeugwerke Aktien Gesellschaft), powered by 75 kW (101 hp) Austro-Daimler 100hp: 8 built.
B.IV
version with revised undercarriage and 75 kW (100 hp) Mercedes engine (1 built)
B.IV(U)
Series 15.5: production by UFAG (Ungarische Flugzeugfabrik Abteil Gesellschaft / Ungarische Flugzeugwerke Aktien Gesellschaft): 8 built.
B.V
version with 100 kW (140 hp) Rapp Rp II engine (6 built)
B.VI
similar to B.V (18 built)

== Operators ==
Austria-Hungary

- Austro-Hungarian Imperial and Royal Aviation Troops

== Specifications ==
General characteristics

- Crew: Two, pilot and observer
- Length: 8.30 m (27 ft 3 in)
- Wingspan: 13.00 m (42 ft 8 in)
- Height: 3.20 m (10 ft 6 in)
- Wing area: 30.4 m^{2} (327 sq ft)
- Empty weight: 560 kg (1,230 lb)
- Gross weight: 920 kg (2,020 lb)
- Powerplant: 1 × Hiero , 63 kW (85 hp)

Performance

- Maximum speed: 125 km/h (78 mph, 68 kn)
- Rate of climb: 2.4 m/s (470 ft/min)
