= Lloyd 40.05 =

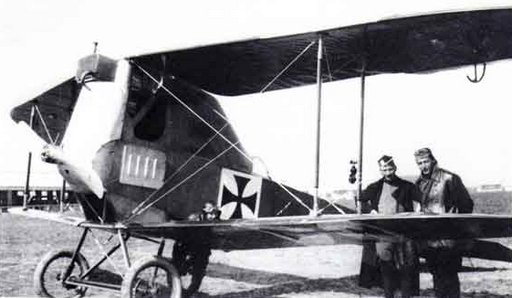
- Lloyd 40.05 cica 1916.

General information
- Type: Fighter / Reconnaissance aircraft
- National origin: Austria-Hungary
- Manufacturer: Lloyd (Ungarische Lloyd Flugzeug und Motorenfabrik AG / Magyar Lloyd Repülőgép és motorgyár Részvény-Társaság)
- Status: Prototype
- Primary user: KuKLFT (Imperial and Royal Aviation Troops - Kaiserliche und Königliche Luftfahrtruppen or K.u.K. Luftfahrtruppen)
- Number built: 2

History
- First flight: January 1916
- Retired: 1916

The Lloyd 40.05 (a.k.a. Type FJ - Flugzeug Jäger - aircraft hunter) was a very unorthodox experimental fighter/reconnaissance biplane produced by Lloyd (Ungarische Lloyd Flugzeug und Motorenfabrik AG / Magyar Lloyd Repülőgép és motorgyár Részvény-Társaság) in the Austro-Hungarian Empire during the First World War.

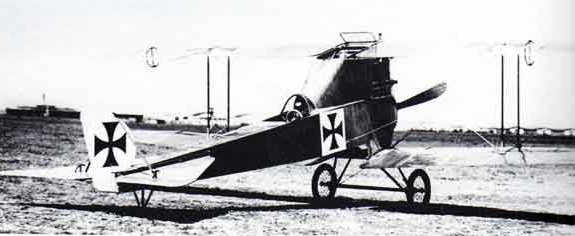
View of pilots position and upper "childs coffin" gunner position.

== Specifications (Lloyd 40.05) ==
Data from Austro-Hungarian Army Aircraft of World War One

General characteristics

- Crew: 2 (later 1)
- Length: 6.92 m (22 ft 8 in)
- Upper wingspan: 11.17 m (36 ft 8 in)
- Lower wingspan: 10.72 m (35 ft 2 in)
- Height: 3.1 m (10 ft 2 in)
- Wing area: 25 m^{2} (270 sq ft)
- Empty weight: 752 kg (1,658 lb)
- Gross weight: 962 kg (2,121 lb)
- Powerplant: 1 × MAG-Daimler 160hp 6-cyl. water-cooled in-line piston engine, 120 kW (160 hp)
- Propellers: 2-bladed wooden fixed pitch propeller

Performance

- Range: 500 km (310 mi, 270 nmi)
- Service ceiling: 5,000 m (16,000 ft)

Armament

- Guns: 1× 8 mm (0.315 in) Schwarzlose M.07/12 machine gun in a Type-II VK gun container + 2x 8 mm (0.315 in) Schwarzlose M.07/12 machine guns fitted to the upper surface of the lower wings outside the propeller arc.
