= LIBIS 180 =

Slovenian aircraft

General information
- Type: Utility aircraft
- National origin: Slovenia
- Manufacturer: LIBIS aircraft (Letalski Inštitut Branko Ivanuš Slovenija)
- Designer: Marjan Slanovec
- Status: 1 airplane in civil use as oldtimer
- Primary user: Slovenian aero clubs
- Number built: 9

History
- Introduction date: 1966
- First flight: 1965
- Retired: 1973
- Developed from: LIBIS KB-6

The LIBIS 180 is a Slovenian sporty three-seater mixed-construction aircraft, mostly wooden with a tail wheel, designed and produced at LIBIS aircraft during Yugoslavian period.

It was used for training, towing gliders, for tourist flights and throwing skydivers. LIBIS 180 represented the further development of the popular school KB-6 Matajur, but was more demanding to fly than the KB-6, because it didn't have an aerodynamic twist to the wing it was difficult to land and did not forgive pilot mistakes at low speed. LIBIS 180 was the first aircraft produced in Yugoslavia, using plastic materials: the bonnet, wing tips and propeller cap were made of glass fibers. The plane has a seat arrangement: two at the front one behind, and a fourth fuel tank is a fuel tank.

The only existing LIBIS 180 (291-11/YU-CVR) has been preserved and is being restored to air-worthy condition at the Maribor aviation centre.

Three LIBIS 180 aircraft visited Klagenfurt, with registration codes YU-CVO, YU-CVP, and YU-CVR.

== Specifications (LIBIS 180, 1966) ==
General characteristics

- Crew: 1 pilot
- Capacity: 2 passengers
- Length: 8.74 m (28 ft 8 in)
- Wingspan: 10.6 m (34 ft 9 in)
- Height: 2.15 m (7 ft 1 in)
- Wing area: 14 m^{2} (150 sq ft)
- Empty weight: 870 kg (1,918 lb)
- Max takeoff weight: 1,231 kg (2,714 lb)
- Fuel capacity: 1x115l+2x40l original
- Powerplant: 1 × Lycoming O-435-1 , 138 kW (185 hp)
- Propellers: 2-bladed wooden Sensenich with fixed pitch, 2.159 m (7 ft 1 in) diameter

Performance

- Cruise speed: 180–230 km/h (110–140 mph, 97–124 kn) economic cruise-fast cruise
- Stall speed: 95–118 km/h (59–73 mph, 51–64 kn) full flaps-flaps up
- Never exceed speed: 350 km/h (220 mph, 190 kn)
- Range: 600 km (370 mi, 320 nmi)
- Ferry range: 800 km (500 mi, 430 nmi) at economical cruise speed
- Service ceiling: 4,160 m (13,650 ft)
- Rate of climb: 4 m/s (790 ft/min)

== See also ==
Aircraft of comparable role, configuration, and era

- LIBIS KB-6
- UTVA Aero 3
- Ikarus Aero 2
- Utva Trojka
- Ikarus Kurir
