= Aviatik (Berg) D.I =

Type of aircraft

Aviatik D.I
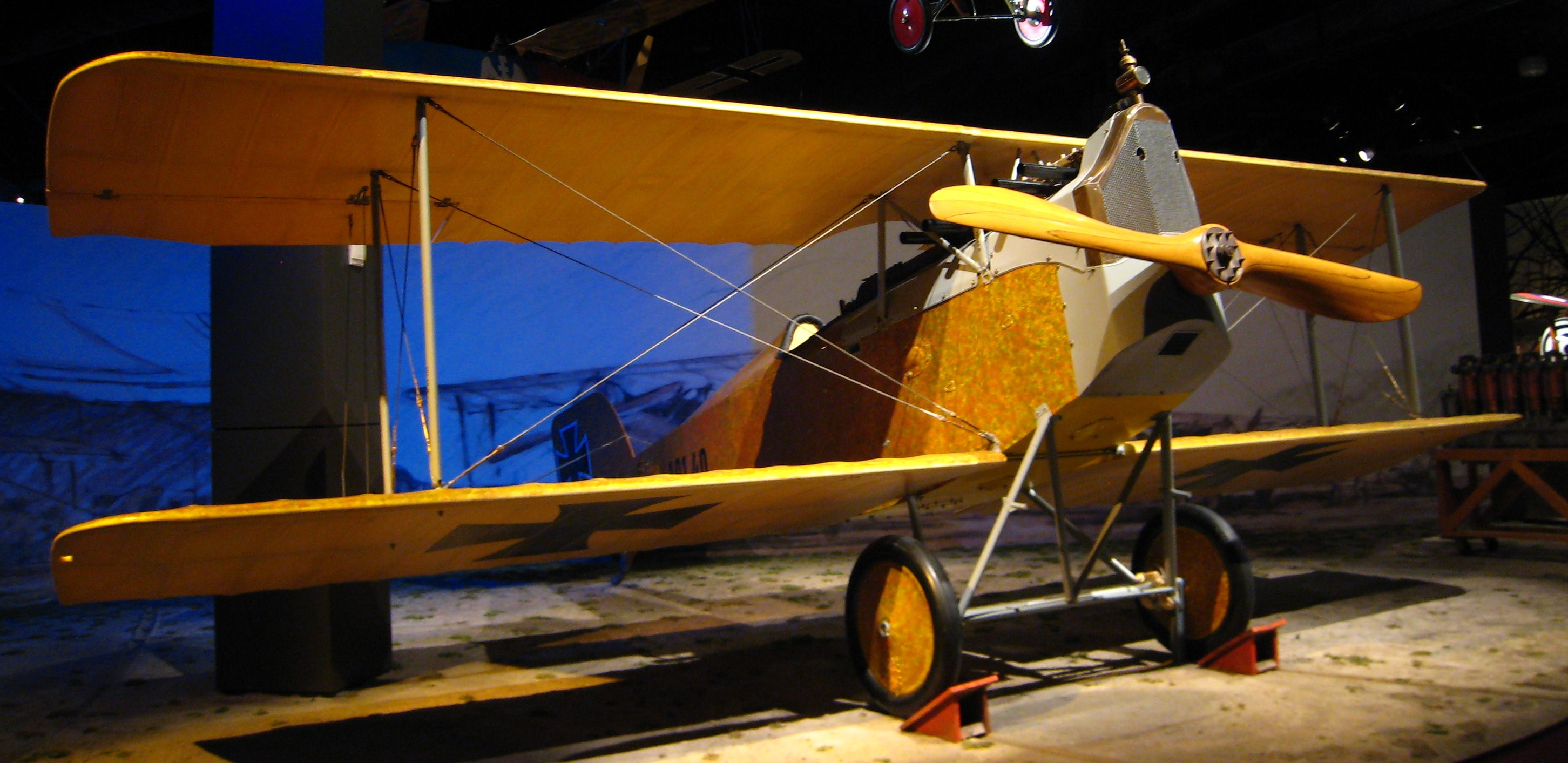
- Aviatik D.I at The Museum of Flight, Seattle.

General information
- Type: Fighter
- Manufacturer: Aviatik
- Designer: Julius von Berg
- Status: Retired
- Primary user: Austro-Hungarian Empire
- Number built: ≈700

History
- Manufactured: 1917 - 1918
- Introduction date: 1917
- First flight: 24 January 1917

The Aviatik (Berg) D.I, was a single-engine, single-seater biplane fighter that was developed and manufactured by the Austro-Hungarian branch of German aircraft company Aviatik. It was also known as Berg D.I or the Berg Fighter, because it was designed by Dipl. Ing. Julius von Berg, and to distinguish it from the D.I fighter built by the parent Aviatik firm in Germany.

The D.I was the first locally designed fighter aircraft to be adopted into the Austro-Hungarian Air Service (Luftfahrtruppen). It was manufactured both in-house and under license by a number of subcontractors. In 1917, the D.I entered Austro-Hungarian service and saw active operations in the final years of the First World War; it was commonly used for aerial reconnaissance missions, as many fighter units continued to prefer using the German-designed Albatros D.III conducting air superiority operations. Following the end of the conflict, it was adopted by the Hungarian Air Force, the Royal Romanian Air Force and the Royal Yugoslav Air Force.

== Development ==
=== Origins ===
The Aviatik (Berg) D.I has its origins within the experimental single-seater 30.14 aircraft. Work on this prototype had commenced during early 1916; aviation author George Haddow described this aircraft as being, in comparison to the later D.I, "ugly" and "cumbersome." However, it also shared many features with its subsequent production form such as the relatively similar design of the wings. According to Haddow, it was claimed by some sources that Professor Richard Knollwer, a high-profile figure within the Austro-Hungarian Empire, has participated in the design of the 30.14.

On 16 October 1916, the first flight of the prototype occurred at Aspern; however, this test flight went badly, resulting in the death of the test pilot. In response, further modifications to the design were made and three additional prototypes were manufactured, labeled 30.19 (for tests on the ground), 30.20 (for in-flight tests) and 30.21 (as a reserve airframe). Construction of the additional test aircraft was completed during late 1916 and the test programme commenced during early 1917. During March 1917, the 30.21 suffered some damage during an eventful landing, however, it was quickly repaired and returned to the flight test programme.

On the whole, the reports of test pilots who flew the prototypes were largely positive, which not only cleared the way for quantity production of the type to commence and for its adoption by the Austro-Hungarian Imperial and Royal Aviation Troops, which quickly placed multiple orders for the type. The first unit to receive production examples (with two synchronized Schwarzloses, on each side of the cylinders) of the D.I was Fluggeschwader I (FLG I, later to be renamed to Flik 101G) on the Divača airfield.

According to Haddow, the prototypes had been largely representative of the initial production D.I aircraft, minor differences include the wings being fitted with greater stagger and the relocation of the aileron control cables. However, they did differ in terms of armament, the prototypes lacking any offensive weapons while production fighters were initially outfitted with a single unsynchronized Schwarzlose machine gun, located above the top wing to fire above the propeller.

=== Production ===
The D.I was manufactured both in-house and under license by a number of subcontractors. The Austrian branch of Aviatik was responsible for producing the 38, 138, 238 and 338 Series itself; all models were produced by external parties, including:

- Lohner manufactured the 115 and 315 Series
- Lloyd manufactured the 48, 248 and 348 Series.
- MAG (Magyar Általános Gépgyár - General Hungarian Machine Works) manufactured the 84 and 92 Series
- Thöne und Fiala manufactured the 101 Series
- Wiener Karosserie Fabrik (WKF) (Vienna Coachwork Factory) manufactured the 184, 284 and 384 Series.

The numbers given to the different series were used to indicate various pieces of information; the first digit represented the manufacturer, the following number being used as a 'type number', which would be followed by a break and addition numbers of identify the individual fighters. The main differences between the different series was in the power of Austro-Daimler engines used (185 hp in the early production aircraft, 200 or 210 hp in the mid-production, and 225 hp in the last ones). Other key areas of change included the positioning of the machine guns, as well as various structural alterations and refinements to the radiator.

By 31 October 1918, 677 Aviatik (Berg) D.I airframes of all batches had been handed over to the Austro-Hungarian Imperial and Royal Aviation Troops. While ordered from Lohner and Thöne und Fiala respectively, both the 215 and 201 Series would remain unbuilt.

== Design ==
The Aviatik (Berg) D.I was a single-seat biplane fighter aircraft. The pilot sat within a high-mounted central position, providing him with a high level of visibility both below and above the upper wing; to enable this seating position, the design featured an uncommonly high decking, which was faired to offer minimal resistance where possible. Much of the design was shaped by the industrial circumstances of the Austro-Hungarian Empire; due to a lack of skilled labour, much of the airframe was as simplified as possible in order to make the type easier to manufacture and capable of being produced in relatively small facilities.

The fuselage of the D.I was rectangular-shaped, composed of a single longeron set at each corner and spaced via bulkheads in the forward section of the fuselage, which provided a mounting point for the engine bearers. Additional reinforcement was provided in the form of tubular steel diagonal struts that ran along the sides of the fuselage between the bearer and the lower wing root. Aft of the cockpit, the bulkheads were dispensed with for lighter frames composed of spruce, which were strengthened by diagonal struts; no internal wire bracing was used throughout the structure, relying upon the external plywood panels for rigidity.

The wings of the D.I used an orthodox structure for the time, composed of spruce spars and leading edges. Steel tubing was used for the compression members while wires were used for internal bracing. A wire-based trailing edge gave the wing a distinctive scalloped appearance. The single-piece upper wing was fixed to the fuselage using the W-shaped struts, while the lower wing was bolted directly onto the side of the lower fuselage. Unblanced ailerons were only fitted onto the upper wing; these were hinged onto false spars set within the framework of the wing and actuated via a projecting lever set into the wing itself. During its later service, the wings had to undergo strengthening in order to support the use of more powerful engines that were adopted during the type's production run.

The D.I incorporated a relatively unconventional innovation in the form of an unusual aerofoil section. Specifically, the upper camber of the wing had a pronounced reflex curvature towards its trailing edge, while the maximum depth was further aft than was standard amongst contemporary fighter aircraft. To enable this unusual construction, the rear-portion of the ribs were somewhat thin and flexible, resulting in the wing "giving" under sudden forces such as gusts of wind, but without losing equilibrium. According to Haddow, these features of the wing were attributable for the D.I's high level of stability, which allegedly did little to lessen or undermine its responsiveness to control inputs, as would normally be the case amongst typical aerodynamically stable fighters.

Early production D.Is were powered by a single Austro-Daimler-built engine, capable of providing 185 hp; the majority of aircraft would be fitted with more powerful 200, 210, and 225 hp units instead. The adoption of the 225 hp engine proved to be too powerful for the airframe, requiring various changes to increase structural strength, particularly within the wing area. Regardless of the engine power, a standardised two-bladed Knoller-Jaray-built propeller was adopted, although an unusual four-bladed unit was used on a minority of aircraft (confirmed on serial number 138.106) in its place.

The majority of aircraft were fitted with a car-type radiator mounted in the aircraft's nose; two different variants were used, a more common rounded-top model and a more angular flat-top unit. Alternatively, some D.Is were provided with a twin-block radiator mounted one above the other on the forward fuselage, which enabled a more streamlined nose to be adopted. Regardless of the version of the radiator used, cooling was a persistent issue suffered by the type. As a result, many D.Is would be flown with the engine cowling being completely removed by ground crews; a solution to the overheating issue was fitted on later-built aircraft in the form of a simple low-cut fringe cowl that kept the engine cylinders exposed and an elongated block radiator fixed onto the leading edge of the wing.

The D.I was fitted with various armaments. It was initially armed with a single Schwarzlose machine gun, which was mounted onto braces set into the upper fuselage; this arrangement was clear of the propeller blades yet still allowed for easy in-flight access to the breach mechanism. Ammunition was stored in a drum within the fuselage decking and belt-fed to the gun via a purpose-built conduit. However, this arrangement was commonly judged to have been outmoded by the time that the D.I was entering service; accordingly, a new armament arrange was soon adopted. A twin Schewarzlose gun arrangement, which featured synchronization gear as to allow the rounds to pass directly between the propeller blades without striking them; however, the locally produced interrupter mechanism was found to be unreliable in service when the engine was run at certain speeds. In spite of the issue, which made the guns prone to striking the propeller blades, this newer armament arrangement was rolled out. Further changes, including the guns being set further back, were also made late on into production.

== Operational service ==
In many respects, the D.I was allegedly proved to have been good combat aircraft amongst its contemporaries. It was a reasonably fast aircraft, possessing excellent flying characteristics and maneuverability, and could reach higher altitudes than most of its adversaries. In addition, the D.I was provided with a roomy and comfortable cockpit which gave a good field of view.

Despite those desirable features, the new Aviatik fighter wasn't greeted with enthusiasm when it entered service in autumn 1917, as the type also had some serious defects which didn't endear it to its pilots. The early aircraft had structural deficiencies and their machine guns were installed beyond the reach of the pilot so that when they jammed, there was nothing the pilot could do about it. These problems were later rectified with the strengthening of the airframe and the repositioning of the guns. While the original Aviatik D-I design by Julius von Berg was sound, the Series 115 aircraft license-produced by the Lohner firm at Wien-Floridsdorf were notorious for failures along the wing trailing edges in high-speed maneuvers, as Lohner had deviated from Aviatik specifications by employing thinner, lighter wing ribs. The main cause of complaints was the engine's tendency to overheat far too easily. To alleviate these cooling problems, operational units tended to fly their aircraft without the engine's top panels, and sometimes the side panels were also left off.

The Austro-Hungarian aviation units used the D.I widely until the end of the First World War on Eastern, Italian and Balkan fronts, mainly as an escort for reconnaissance aircraft, as most of the fighter units preferred the Albatros D.III for air superiority. During 1918, a single D.I was forced down in an undamaged state on the Italian font; this undamaged example was later shipped back to the United Kingdom, where it was subject to an extensive evaluation, which found it to be comparable to its various peers of the time, being particularly light, strong, and simplistic in terms of its construction. The captured aircraft was later put on public display in London.

== Variants ==
Aviatik D.I Series 38
Aviatik-built aircraft powered by 185 hp (138 kW) Austro-Daimler 6 engine. 79 built.
Aviatik D.I Series 138
Aviatik-built aircraft powered by 200 hp (150 kW) Austro Daimler engine. 86 accepted into service by August 1918.
Aviatik D.I Series 238
Aviatik-built aircraft powered by 160 hp (120 kW) Austro Daimler engine.
Aviatik D.I Series 338
Aviatik-built aircraft powered by 225 hp (168 kW) Austro Daimler engine.

The D.II was a version of the D.I with a cantilever lower wing. The model went into production in late 1918 in two Series (39 and 339), but the production aircraft were too late for operational service. The D.III high-altitude version with a 230 hp Hiero engine and the Dr.I triplane development remained as prototypes only.

== Operators ==
Austria-Hungary

- Austro-Hungarian Imperial and Royal Aviation Troops
- Austro-Hungarian Navy

Hungary

- Royal Hungarian Air Force - Postwar.

Romania

- Royal Romanian Air Force - Postwar.

Kingdom of Yugoslavia

- Royal Yugoslav Air Force - Postwar.

== Specifications (D.I) ==
Data from Jane's Vintage Aircraft Recognition Guide The O. Aviatik (Berg) D.I

General characteristics

- Crew: 1
- Length: 6.86 m (22 ft 6 in)
- Wingspan: 8 m (26 ft 3 in)
- Height: 2.48 m (8 ft 2 in)
- Wing area: 21.8 m^{2} (235 sq ft)
- Empty weight: 610 kg (1,345 lb)
- Gross weight: 852 kg (1,878 lb)
- Powerplant: 1 × Austro-Daimler 6 6-cylinder water-cooled in-line piston engine, 147 kW (197 hp)
- Propellers: 2-bladed fixed-pitch propeller

Performance

- Maximum speed: 185 km/h (115 mph, 100 kn) at sea level
- Endurance: 2 hours 30 minutes
- Service ceiling: 6,150 m (20,180 ft)
- Wing loading: 38.9 kg/m^{2} (8.0 lb/sq ft)
- Power/mass: 0.17 kW/kg (0.11 hp/lb)

Armament

- Guns: 2 × fixed 8 mm Schwarzlose MG M.07/12 machine guns

== See also ==
Aircraft of comparable role, configuration, and era

- Albatros D.Va
- Ansaldo SVA
- Fokker D.V
- Lohner Type AA
- Morane-Saulnier AI
- Nieuport 28
- Pfalz D.III
- Phönix D.I
- Royal Aircraft Factory S.E.5
- Sopwith Camel
- SPAD S.XIII

Related lists

- List of fighter aircraft
- List of military aircraft of the Central Powers in World War I
