= Liberty P-2 =

P-2

General information
- Type: Monoplane
- National origin: United States
- Manufacturer: Liberty Aircraft Sales & Mfg Co, Lambert Field, Robertson MO

History
- Introduction date: 1931

The Liberty Model P-2, also called the Liberty Model A, was a two-seat parasol wing monoplane built by the Liberty Aircraft Sales & Mfg Co of St.Louis, Missouri.

== Design ==
The P-2 was a strut-braced parasol wing aircraft with conventional landing gear and side-by-side seating in an open cockpit. The wings used wood spars and aluminum ribs with aircraft fabric covering. The tailplane was adjustable.

== Specifications (P-2) ==
Data from Airway Age

General characteristics

- Capacity: 2
- Length: 19 ft 6 in (5.94 m)
- Wingspan: 35 ft (11 m)
- Height: 6 ft 4 in (1.93 m)
- Wing area: 145 sq ft (13.5 m^{2})
- Fuel capacity: 15 U.S. gallons (57 L; 12 imp gal)
- Powerplant: 1 × Szekeley , 45 hp (34 kW)

Performance

- Maximum speed: 78 kn (90 mph, 140 km/h)
- Cruise speed: 68 kn (78 mph, 126 km/h)
- Range: 350 nmi (400 mi, 640 km)
- Service ceiling: 18,500 ft (5,600 m)
- Rate of climb: 750 ft/min (3.8 m/s)
