= Lohner B.I =

1912 aircraft produced in Austria-Hungary

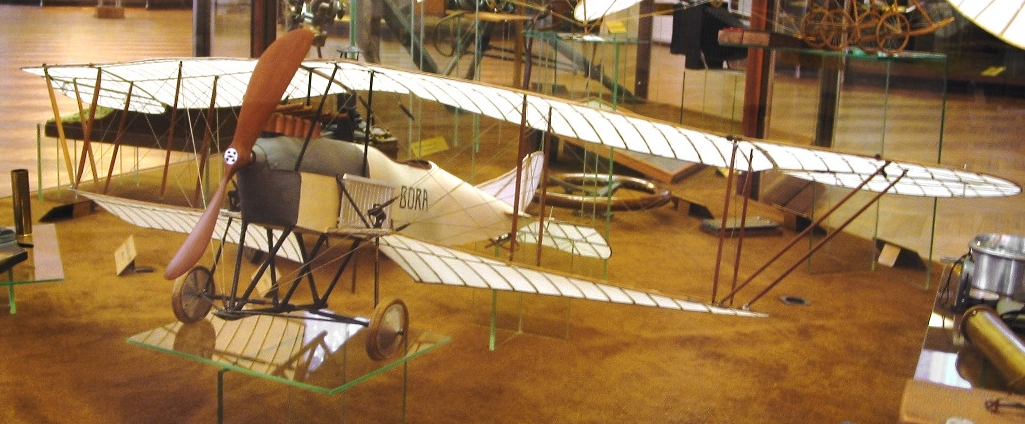
- The Lohner B.1 at the Museum of Military History, Vienna

General information
- Type: Reconnaissance aircraft
- National origin: Austria-Hungary
- Manufacturer: Lohner
- Primary user: KuKLFT

History
- Variants: B.II and B.VII

The Lohner B.I was a military reconnaissance aircraft produced in Austria-Hungary during World War I. As Lohner strove to perfect the design, a variety of increasingly powerful engines were fitted, reflected in a range of military designations from B.II through to B.VI until the definitive B.VII was finally produced. This last version was also produced in an armed variant, designated the C.I.

== Design and development ==
The B.I design originated before the war and was initially known as the Pfeilflieger ("Arrow-flier") on account of its sharply swept-back wings, giving it an arrow-shaped plan form. Apart from this feature, it was an otherwise conventional biplane design with two-bay, staggered wings of unequal span. The pilot and observer (or instructor) sat in tandem in an open cockpit.

The first batch was produced for the Luftschiffabteilung ("Airship Section") of the Austro-Hungarian army in late 1912, after a national fundraising campaign conducted by the Österreichischer Aero-Club ("Austrian Aero-Club"). Known at this time as the Type B, the army took delivery of 28 aircraft before asking Lohner to develop a version better suited for mountain-flying, leading to the B.II which replaced the B.I in production in mid 1914. However, during the course of 1915, production was briefly revived (along with the then-surpassed B.II) under licence at Flugzeugwerk Fischamend for use as trainers.

== Operational history ==
On 17 December 1913, during the war with Morocco, a Spanish expeditionary squadron of the Aeronáutica Militar became the first organized air force unit to see combat during the first systematic bombing in history by dropping aerial bombs from a Lohner Flecha airplane on the plain of Ben Karrix in Morocco.

== Variants ==
B.I
Original Pfeilflieger design.
B.II
The Lohner B.II variant, a version better suited for mountain-flying.
B.II
Production version with 63 kW (85 hp) Hiero engine (96 built)
B.III
Version with 75 kW (100 hp) Mercedes, 90 kW (120 hp) Austro-Daimler (Lohner versions) or 75 kW (100 hp) Austro-Daimler (Ufag version) (30 built)
B.IV
Version with revised undercarriage and 75 kW (100 hp) Mercedes engine (9 built, 8 of these by Ufag)
B.V
Version with 100 kW (140 hp) Rapp engine (6 built)
B.VI
Similar to B.V (18 built)
B.VII
The Lohner B.VII was the definitive version with 110 kW (150 hp) or 120 kW (160 hp) Austro Daimler engine (73 built).
C.1
An armed variant based on the B.VII fitted with a 120 kW (160 hp) Austro Daimler engine and armed with single machine gun on trainable mount for observer (40 built).
Flecha
The Lohner Flecha (Arrow) or Barrón Flecha, was a variant of the Lohner B.1 developed in Spain by engineer Eduardo Barrón in 1915. It would remain in service until 1919. The Flecha would be used as a platform by Barrón in order to develop a new model in 1917, the Barrón W.

== Operators ==
Austria-Hungary

- Austro-Hungarian Imperial and Royal Aviation Troops

Spain

- Aeronáutica Militar (1913 - 1917)

== Specifications ==
Data from Grosz 2002

General characteristics

- Crew: Two, pilot and observer
- Length: 8.50 m (27 ft 11 in)
- Wingspan: 13.40 m (44 ft 0 in)
- Height: 3.00 m (9 ft 10 in)
- Wing area: 37.5 m^{2} (403 sq ft)
- Empty weight: 630 kg (1,390 lb)
- Gross weight: 970 kg (2,130 lb)
- Powerplant: 1 × Austro-Daimler , 70 kW (90 hp)

Performance

- Maximum speed: 115 km/h (72 mph, 63 kn)
- Rate of climb: 1.4 m/s (270 ft/min)
