= Austro-Daimler 6 =

Austro-Daimler
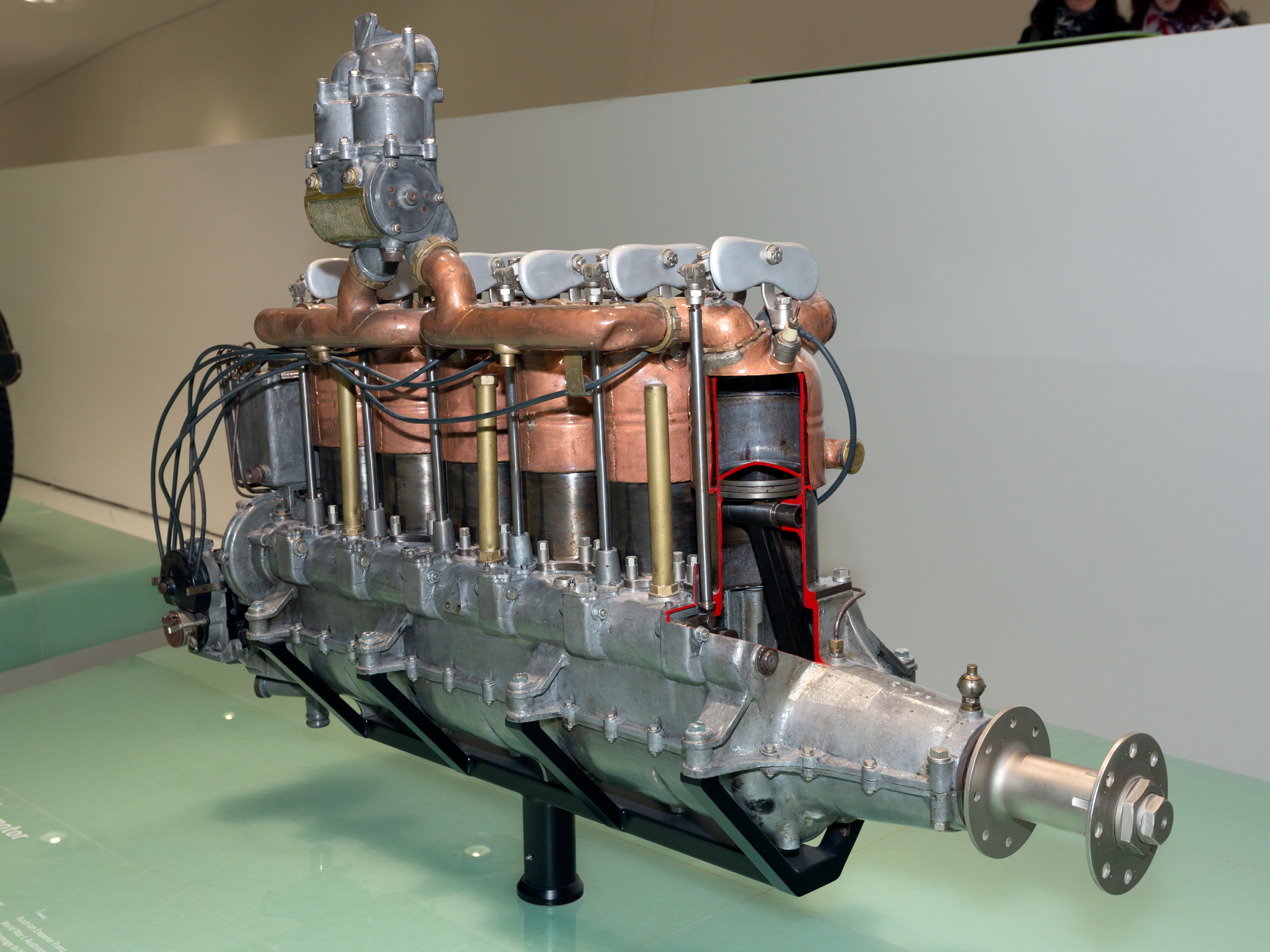
- A 1912 Austro-Daimler 6 on display at the Porsche Museum
- Type: 6-cyl. water-cooled in-line piston engine
- National origin: Austria
- Manufacturer: Austro-Daimler
- First run: 1910
- Variants: Beardmore 120 hp

The Austro-Daimler 6 was a series of Austrian six-cylinder water-cooled inline aero engines first produced in 1910 by the Austro-Daimler company.

== Design and development ==
The first Austro-Daimler six-cylinder engine was designed by Dr-Ing Ferdinand Porsche to be an aircraft engine from the outset. Of high quality manufacture, the Austro-Daimler was modestly rated at relatively low rpm, which gave the engine family a reputation for robustness and reliability.

Features of the Austro-Daimler included welded steel water jackets (originally copper), seven main bearings and large diameter inclined inlet and exhaust valves opened by dual action push-pull rods and closed by spring pressure.

The single-overhead cam (SOHC) valvetrain of later engines was driven from the crankshaft through the usual vertically-oriented shaft as the contemporary Mercedes D.III was, but the Austro-Daimler had its vertical camshaft drive system mounted at the front of the engine instead, and not the usual aft-end placement of other Central Powers straight-six SOHC liquid-cooled aircraft powerplants, like the Mercedes and BMW designs.

The Austro-Daimler inspired many imitators such as the Mercedes D.II, Benz Bz.IV and Hiero 6. Limited availability of the Austro-Daimler engines forced some aircraft manufacturers to substitute Mercedes (the German Daimler company) engines in their aircraft, due to greater availability. From 1913, the 90 and 120 hp models were produced under license in Scotland by William Beardmore and Company. The Beardmore 120 hp went on to power many British military aircraft during WW1.

== Variants ==
Data from:

Austro-Daimler 90 hp 6-cyl.
The original low capacity version developing 90 hp (67.11 kW), introduced in 1910.
Austro-Daimler 120 hp 6-cyl.
Up-rated with a capacity of 13.9 L (848.23 cu in), from 130 mm (5.12 in) bore and 175 mm (6.89 in) stroke, developing 120 hp (89.48 kW) at 1,200 rpm, introduced in 1911.
Austro-Daimler 160 hp 6-cyl.
developing 160 hp (119.31 kW), introduced in 1913.
Austro-Daimler 185 hp 6-cyl.
developing 185 hp (137.95 kW), introduced in 1916.
Austro-Daimler 200 hp 6-cyl.
Up-rated with a capacity of 15.03 L (917.19 cu in), from 135 mm (5.31 in) bore and 175 mm (6.89 in), developing 200 hp (149.14 kW) at 1,350 rpm, introduced in December 1916.
Austro-Daimler 210 hp 6-cyl.
210 hp (156.60 kW), introduced in late 1917.
Austro-Daimler 225 hp 6-cyl.
developing 225 hp (167.78 kW), introduced in 1918.

== Applications ==
- Albatros D.II (Oef) (Austro-Daimler 185 hp 6-cyl.)
- Albatros D.III (Oef) (Austro-Daimler 200 hp 6-cyl.)
- Aviatik B.I
- Aviatik B.II
- Aviatik D.I
- Etrich VII
- Hansa-Brandenburg C.I
- Hansa-Brandenburg D.I
- Lohner C.I
- Lohner Type AA (Austro-Daimler 185 hp 6-cyl.)

== Specifications (Austro-Daimler 200 hp) ==
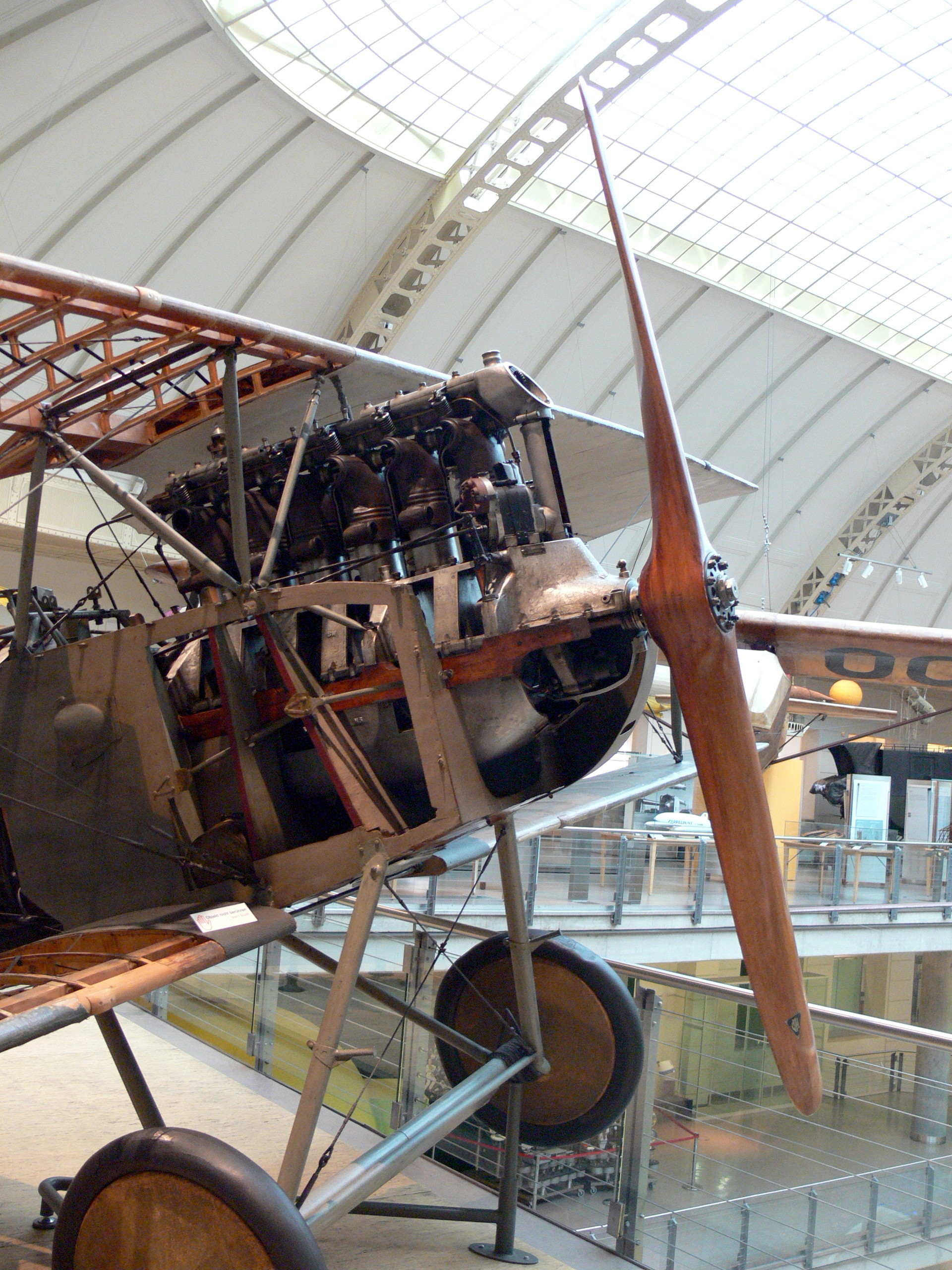
A 147 kW (197 hp) Austro-Daimler fitted to an Aviatik (Berg) D.I, on display at the Vienna Technical Museum

Data from

=== General characteristics ===
- Type: 6-cylinder liquid-cooled inline engine
- Bore: 135 mm (5.31 in)
- Stroke: 175 mm (6.89 in)
- Displacement: 15.0 L (915.48 cu in)
- Length: 1,724 mm (67.875 in)
- Width: 568 mm (22.375 in)
- Height: 1,149 mm (45.25 in)
- Dry weight: 330.4 kg (728.5 lb)

=== Components ===
- Fuel system: One duplex Austro-Daimler carburetor

=== Performance ===
- Power output: 149 kW (200 hp) at 1,400 rpm (rated). 166 kW (222 hp) at 1,600 rpm (maximum).
- Compression ratio: 5.02:1
- Specific fuel consumption: 0.304 kg/kWh (0.499 lb/(hp⋅h))

== See also ==
Comparable engines

- BMW IIIa
- Hiero 6
- Liberty L-6
- Mercedes D.III
- SPA 6A

Related lists

- List of aircraft engines
