= Lohner 10.15 =

Racing monoplane

General information
- Type: monoplane racing aircraft
- National origin: Austro-Hungarian Empire
- Manufacturer: Lohnerwerke GmbH
- Primary user: Luftschifferabteilung (LA)
- Number built: 1

History
- First flight: January 1914

The Lohner 10.15, also known as Schichtpreis Eindecker Type 1914, Lohner A 23, Gnome-Etrich and by its c/n AD 489 (AD 498?), was a monoplane racing aircraft designed and built in late 1913 for the 1914 Schichtpreis race. Requisitioned at the start of World War I by the Luftschifferabteilung (LA), the sole 10.15 remained active as a trainer until at least November 1917.

== Design and development ==
Construction of the 10.15 began in October 1913 as the last Lohner aircraft built as a Taube with the distinctive wing plan-form and warping wing roll control. Construction of the 10.15 was conventional with fabric-covered wooden structure and shoulder-mounted wings wire-braced to king-posts above and below the fuselage. The undercarriage consisted of a sprung wooden tail-skid and sprung main-wheels on a split axle attached to the fuselage and king-posts.

Power was supplied by an 80 hp (60 kW) Gnome Lambda 7-cylinder rotary engine.

== Operational history ==
AD 489 did not compete in the 1914 Scichtpreis race as the pilot, Viktor Wittmann elected to fly the Pfeilflieger AD 553 (Lohner 10.16) which was also entered in his name. The aircraft was also entered in to the Third International Flugmeeting in June 1914 (competition number 23), but did not garner any prizes.

After being requisitioned at the start of World War I by the Luftschifferabteilung (LA), the sole 10.15 remained active as a trainer until at least November 1917, serving with Flek 1, 6 and 8.

== Units using this aircraft ==
Austria-Hungary

- Luftschifferabteilung
- Kaiserliche und Königliche Luftfahrtruppen

== Specifications (10.15) ==
Data from Austro-Hungarian Army Aircraft of World War I

General characteristics

- Crew: 2
- Length: 7.7 m (25 ft 3 in)
- Wingspan: 11.6 m (38 ft 1 in)
- Height: 2.5 m (8 ft 2 in)
- Wing area: 32 m^{2} (340 sq ft)
- Empty weight: 278 kg (613 lb)
- Gross weight: 658 kg (1,451 lb)
- Powerplant: 1 × Gnome Lambda 7-cylinder air-cooled rotary piston engine, 60 kW (80 hp)
- Propellers: 2-bladed wooden fixed pitch propeller

Performance

- Maximum speed: 130 km/h (81 mph, 70 kn)
- Time to altitude: 1,000 m (3,300 ft) in 9 minutes
