= Lincoln-Page PT =

American training aircraft

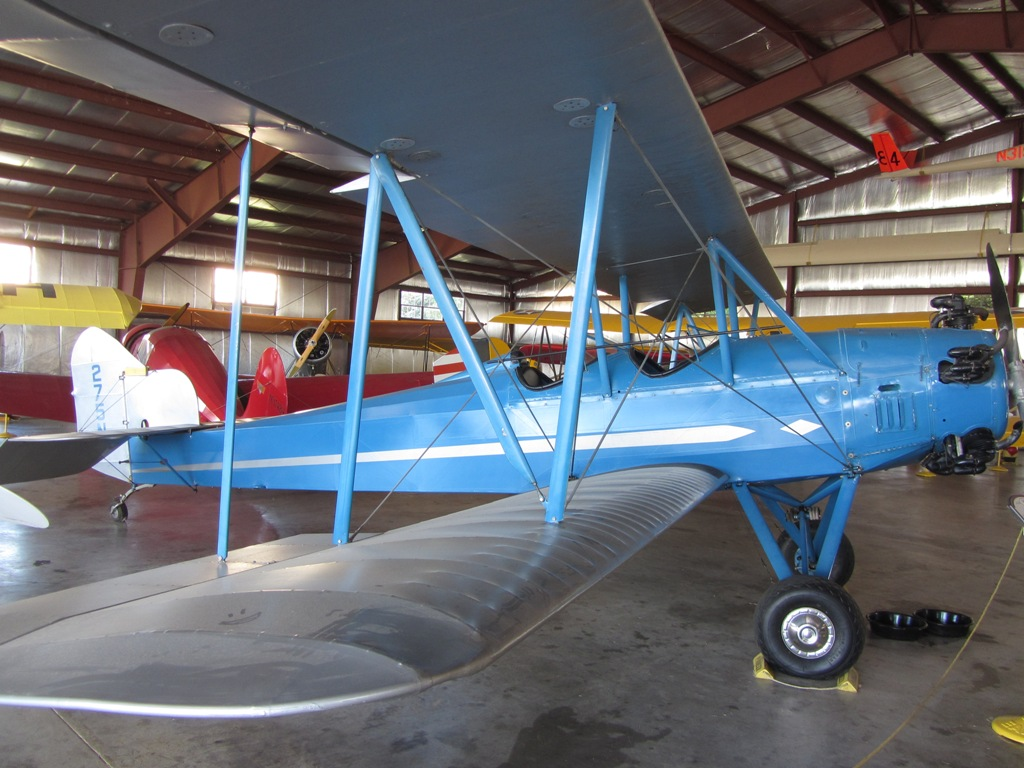
- Lincoln-Page PT-K

General information
- Type: Primary Trainer
- National origin: United States
- Manufacturer: Lincoln-Page
- Designer: A.H. Saxon
- Primary user: Private operators
- Number built: 56

History
- First flight: 1929
- Developed from: Lincoln-Page LP-3

The Lincoln-Page PT is an American open-cockpit two-seat single-bay biplane trainer aircraft produced from 1929 to 1931.

== Manufacture and operations ==
Lincoln-Page (Note: Lincoln-Page became Lincoln, however most contemporaries carried on calling the firm Lincoln-Page.) were eager to take a share of the emerging trainer market. Using their Lincoln-Page LP-3 as a basis they set about designing the PT. The resultant aircraft was quite different from the LP-3, having tandem cockpits and a lengthened rear fuselage. The design bears a resemblance to the Swallow aircraft, partially from manager Victor Roos prior history with the company. Structure was standard for its day:- welded steel tube warren girder fuselage with spruce spars and basswood ribs for the wings. With the ubiquitous Curtiss OX-5 the PT proved quite versatile and able to perform basic aerobatic manoeuvers without too much effort. It was awarded ATC no 181 in July 1929.

The aircraft was also offered with a Curtiss OXX-6 100 hp (75 kW) engine, but no evidence exists that any were produced. However, a later variant using a Kinner K-5 radial engine was named Lincoln PT-K.

== Surviving aircraft ==
A PT-K is on display at the EAA AirVenture Museum. In August 2014 three other PTs were registered by the Federal Aviation Administration as owned by private pilot owners in the United States.

== Variants ==
PT (ATC 181)
90 hp (67 kW) Curtiss OX-5 or 100 hp (75 kW) Curtiss OXX-6 V-8 engine. 28 built.
PT-K (ATC 279)
100 hp (75 kW) Kinner K-5 radial engine. 18 built
PT-W (ATC 284)
110 hp (82 kW) Warner Scarab radial engine. 5 built
PT-T (ATC 344)
90 hp (67 kW) Brownback Tiger. 5 built

== Specifications ==
Data from Specifications of American Commercial Airplanes, EAA Museum

General characteristics

- Crew: 2
- Length: 23 ft 7 in (7.19 m)
- Wingspan: 32 ft 3 in (9.83 m)
- Height: 8 ft 10 in (2.69 m)
- Wing area: 297 sq ft (27.6 m^{2})
- Empty weight: 1,290 lb (585 kg)
- Gross weight: 1,800 lb (816 kg)
- Fuel capacity: 30 US gal (25 imp gal; 110 L)
- Powerplant: 1 × Curtiss OX-5 water-cooled V8 engine, 90 hp (67 kW)
- Propellers: 2-bladed fixed pitch propeller

Performance

- Maximum speed: 105 mph (169 km/h, 91 kn)
- Cruise speed: 90 mph (140 km/h, 78 kn)
- Range: 300 mi (480 km, 260 nmi)
- Service ceiling: 14,000 ft (4,300 m)
- Rate of climb: 800 ft/min (4.1 m/s)
- Landing speed: 38 mph (33 kn; 61 km/h)

== See also ==
Aircraft of comparable role, configuration, and era

- Swallow TP
- Command-Aire 3C3-T
