= Lohner M =

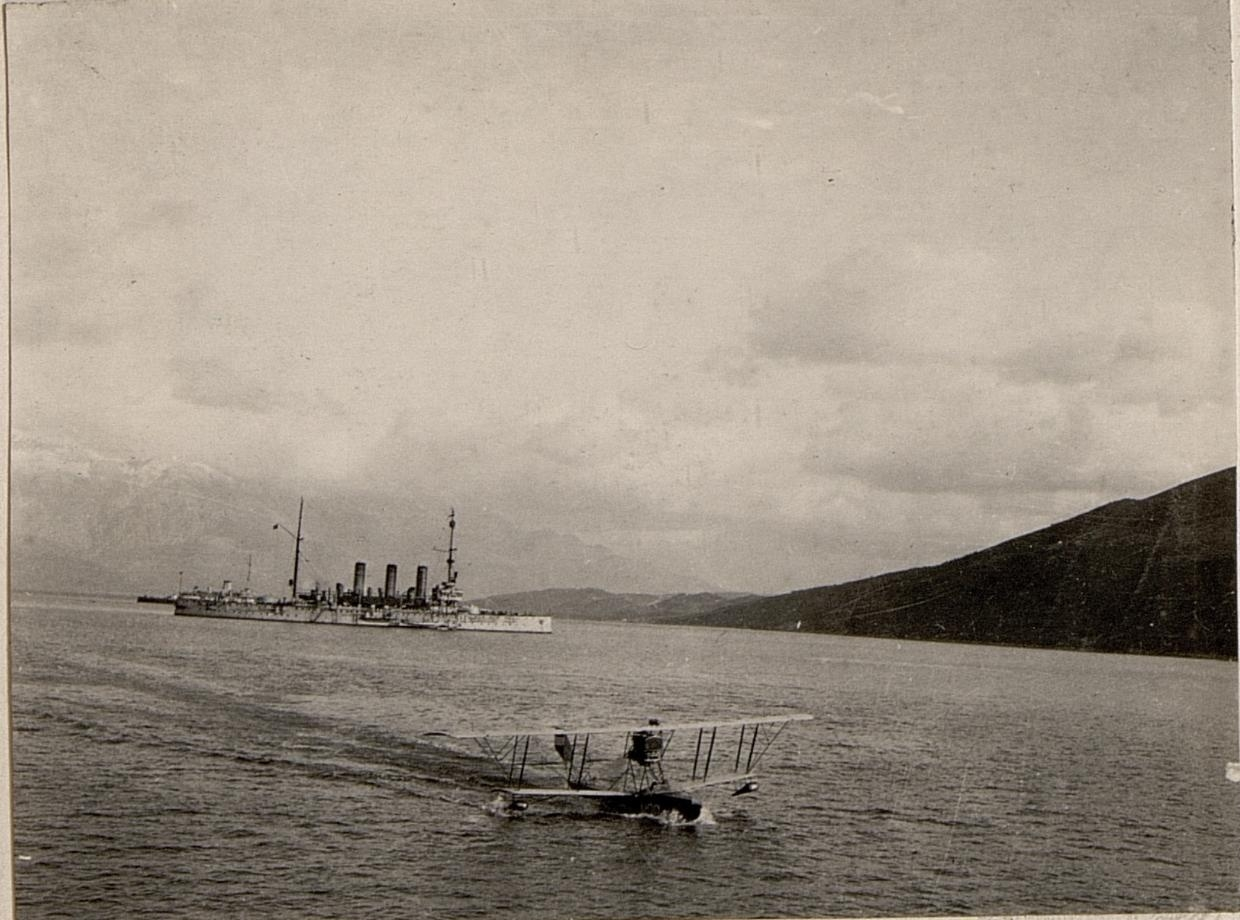
- A Lohner Mk taxiing on the water, 23 May 1916

General information
- Type: Reconnaissance flying boat
- National origin: Austria-Hungary
- Manufacturer: Lohner
- Number built: 15

History
- Introduction date: 1914
- First flight: c. 1914

The Lohner M was a reconnaissance flying boat produced in small numbers in Austria-Hungary during World War I. It was a two-bay biplane of typical configuration for the flying boats of the day, with its pusher engine mounted on struts in the interplane gap. The pilot and observer sat side by side in an open cockpit, and both the upper and lower sets of wings featured sweepback.

== Operators ==
Austria-Hungary

- Austro-Hungarian Navy

German Empire

- Kaiserliche Marine

== Specifications (Lohner Mn) ==
Data from Lohner Type M

General characteristics

- Crew: two, pilot and observer
- Length: 9.5 m (31 ft 2 in)
- Upper wingspan: 13.4 m (44 ft 0 in)
- Lower wingspan: 9.2 m (30 ft 2 in)
- Height: 3.1 m (10 ft 2 in)
- Wing area: 31 m^{2} (330 sq ft)
- Empty weight: 674 kg (1,486 lb)
- Gross weight: 900 kg (1,984 lb)
- Powerplant: 1 × 85 hp. Hiero water-cooled in-line piston engine, 63 kW (85 hp)
- Propellers: 2-bladed fixed-pitch propeller

Performance

- Maximum speed: 90 km/h (56 mph, 49 kn)
- Range: 300 km (190 mi, 160 nmi)
- Service ceiling: 2,400 m (7,900 ft)
- Time to altitude: 10 minutes to 500 m (1,600 ft)

Armament

- Guns: 1 × trainable machine gun for observer
- Bombs: 50 kg (110 lb) of bombs

== See also ==
Related development

- Lohner E

Aircraft of comparable role, configuration, and era

- Donnet-Denhaut flying boat

Related lists

- List of maritime patrol aircraft
- List of flying boats and floatplanes
- List of World War I Central Powers aircraft
