= Lloyd C.I =

1910s Austro-Hungarian reconnaissance aircraft

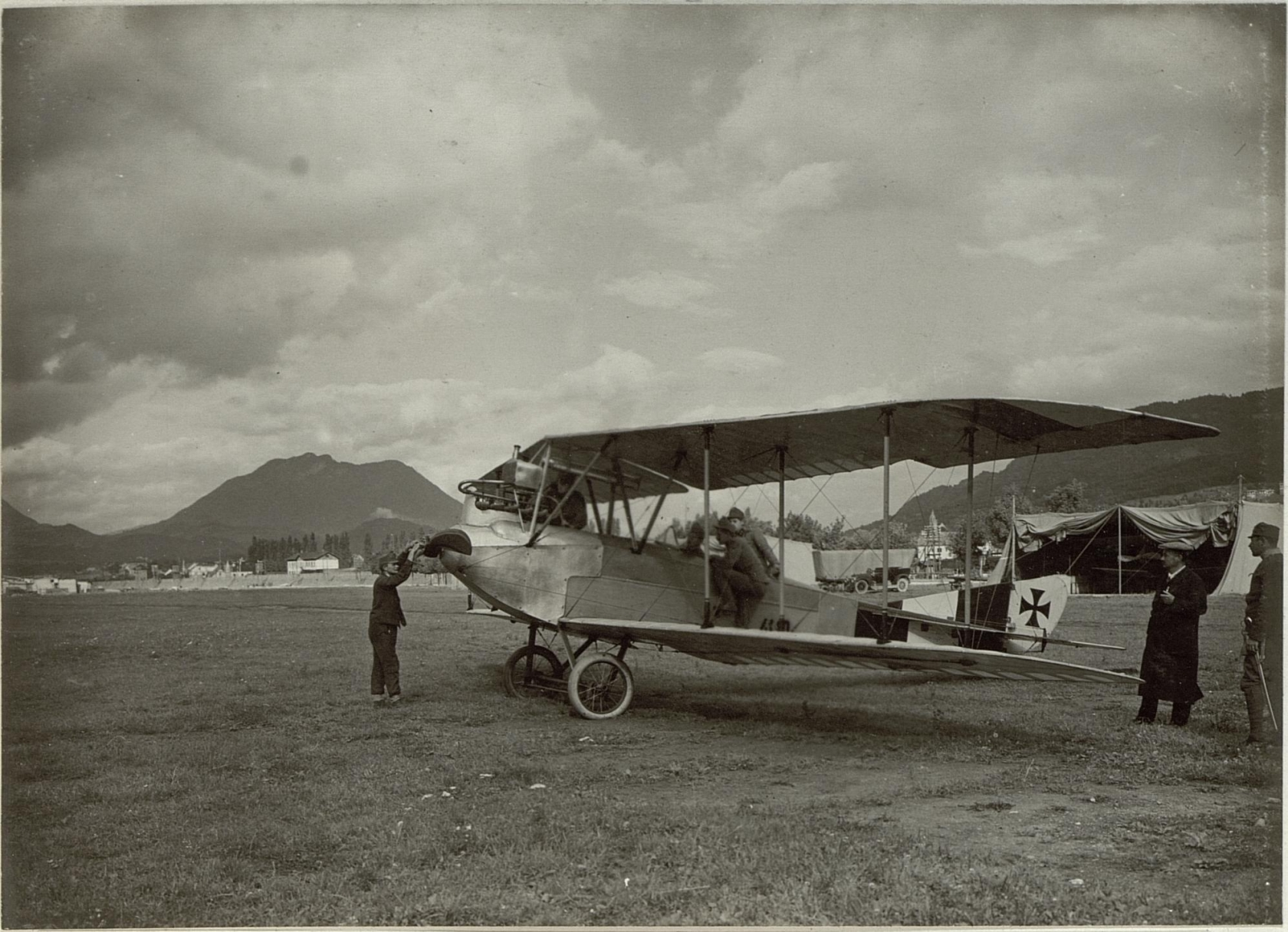

General information
- Type: Reconnaissance aircraft
- National origin: Austria-Hungary
- Manufacturer: Lloyd
- Primary user: KuKLFT
- Number built: 13

History
- First flight: 1913

The Lloyd C.I was a reconnaissance aircraft produced in Austria-Hungary shortly before and during the First World War, and which formed the basis for a number of other closely related types.

== Design and development ==
The C.1 was the Lloyd company's own design, but reflected the DFW designs that Lloyd had previously been building under licence, in particular, in its swept-back, "Pfeil" ("arrow")-style wings. Apart from this feature, it was a conventional biplane design for its day, with staggered wings of unequal span and accommodation for the pilot and observer in tandem, open cockpits. The fuselage was built from welded steel tube, and was covered in fabric. A small load of bombs could be carried internally, to be released by the observer.

The type was demonstrated at the 1914 Vienna air meet, piloted by Lloyd founder Oblt Heinrich Bier. On the first day of flying (21 June), he used it to set two altitude records, one for a pilot and single passenger (6,170 m or 20,237 ft) and one for pilot and two passengers (5,440 m or 17,843 ft), also winning the altitude competition for the meet.

== Operators ==
Austria-Hungary

- Austro-Hungarian Imperial and Royal Aviation Troops

== Specifications ==
Data from Grosz 2002, German & Austro-Hungarian Aircraft Manufacturers 1908–1918

General characteristics

- Crew: 2
- Length: 8.9 m (29 ft 2 in)
- Upper wingspan: 14.4 m (47 ft 3 in)
- Lower wingspan: 13.6 m (44 ft 7 in)
- Height: 3.15 m (10 ft 4 in)
- Wing area: 44 m^{2} (470 sq ft)
- Empty weight: 843 kg (1,858 lb)
- Gross weight: 1,329 kg (2,930 lb)
- Powerplant: 1 × Hiero 145hp 6-cyl. water-cooled in-line piston engine, 108 kW (145 hp)

Performance

- Maximum speed: 128 km/h (80 mph, 69 kn)
- Service ceiling: 6,174 m (20,256 ft)
- Rate of climb: 2.8 m/s (550 ft/min)
