= Lohner Type AA =

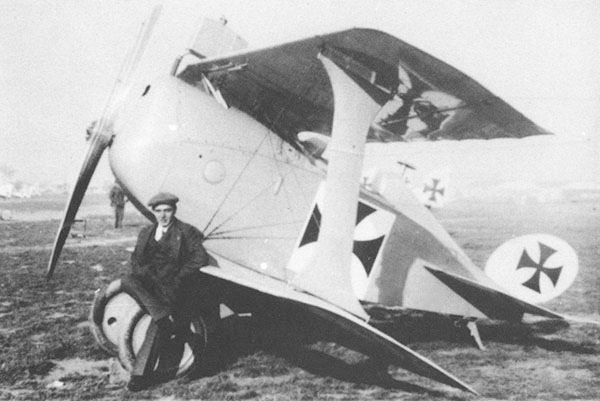
- Lohner 10.20 with no vertical fin and all moving rudder.

General information
- Type: Fighter
- National origin: Austria-Hungary
- Manufacturer: Lohner-Werke
- Designer: Leopold Bauer
- Number built: 4

History
- Introduction date: 5 September 1916.
- First flight: 29 December 1916

The Lohner Type AA (a.k.a. Lohner 10.20, 10.20A, 10.20B, 111.01, 111.02, 111.03, Lohner Dr.I and Lohner D.I) were a series of prototype fighters built during World War I. The program would eventually be cancelled due to inherent instability concerns of the design.

== Design and development ==
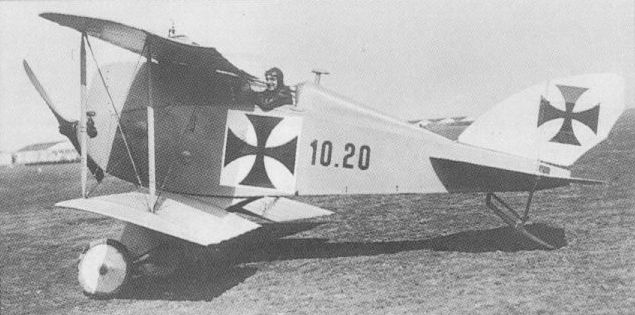
The Lohner 10.20A with lengthened fuselage, twin struts and vertical fin.

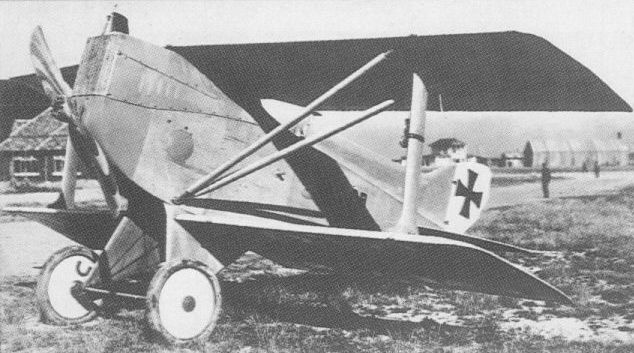
The Lohner 10.20B showing its prominent dorsal fin.

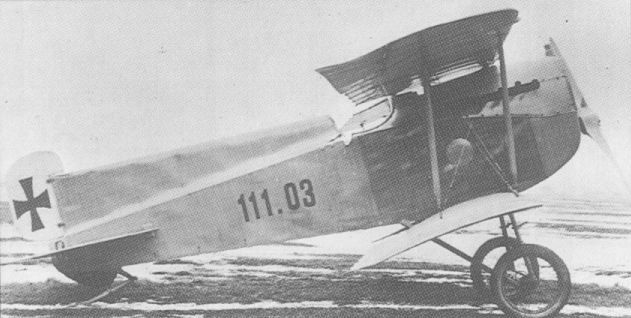
111.03 with massive dorsal fin.

In 1916 the manufacturing company Lohner-Werke of Vienna was given a contract from the Luftfahrttruppen to design and build a single seat fighter based around the 185 hp (138 kW) Austro-Daimler six-cylinder inline engine.

Work was begun on the first airframe, serial number 111.01, and on 5 September 1916 the Lohner 10.20 was unveiled at Aspern. It was a single-bay biplane with equal-span wings and I-type struts. The empennage incorporated a conventional horizontal stabilizer with no vertical stabilizer and an abbreviated all-moving rudder. The fuselage was short and deep of laminated wood construction, armed with twin synchronized Schwarzlose machine guns.

During taxi trials, insufficient yaw control was reported with a tendency to "swap ends". A larger rudder was installed and the fuselage lengthened from 4.65 to 5.85 m (15 ft 3 in to 19 ft 2 in). The Lohner 10.20 first flew on 29 December 1916 and exhibited poor stability. Further test flights followed and the prototype was severely damaged when it crashed in February 1917.

The fighter was sent back to the Lohner-Werke factory where repairs and extensive modification were completed. Now referred to as the Lohner 10.20A, the fuselage was again lengthened to 6.35 m (20 ft 10 in), the I type struts were replaced with the more common twin struts with wire braces. The tail was completely redesigned with a fixed vertical fin and an even larger rudder. Flight testing of the 10.20A continued until 6 June 1917, when it was totally destroyed in another crash.

The second fighter prototype built was serial number 111.02, called the 10.20B. Tail surfaces were similar to the 10.20A and a deep dorsal fin was added. The I-type wing struts returned, reinforced by inclined V-struts. Its initial flight was at Aspern on 2 June 1917. In August 1917 the Luftfahrttruppen commandeered 10.02B and official trials continued through October when further development of this airframe ended.

The third airframe built was known only as 111.03. The I-type struts were again dropped in favor of the twin struts with wire braces and in an effort to gain directional stability the dorsal fin became even more pronounced. First flown on 28 June 1917, flight testing continued through October. Due to the lackluster performance, further development was halted and the Luftfahrttruppen assigned Lohner-Werke a licence to produce the Aviatik (Berg) D.I.

A triplane version of the 111.03 was built as the Lohner Dr.I / Type A / 111.04.

== Variants ==
Data from:Austro-Hungarian Army Aircraft of World War One

Type A
Company designation for the 111.04 / Dr.I triplane.
Type AA
company designation for a 1916 fighter; four prototypes ordered.
Lohner 10.20
Luftfahrtruppen designation for the first prototype, with single I-section inter-plane struts, first flown on 29 December 1916.
Lohner 10.20A
the first prototype modified with more conventional twin inter-plane struts and longer fuselage, first flight 4 March 1917.
Lohner 10.20B
The second aircraft, which was much revised, reprising the I-section inter-plane struts. The fuselage had a long dorsal fin running from the cockpit back to the fin.
Lohner 111.01
Later Luftfahrtruppen designation for the 10.20A.
Lohner 111.02
Later Luftfahrtruppen designation for the 10.20B.
Lohner 111.03
Luftfahrtruppen designation for the third aircraft, with twin inter-plane struts.
Lohner 111.04
Triplane version of the 111.03, first flown on 7 July 1917.
Lohner D.I
A generic military designation for all of the above
Lohner Dr.I
A generic military designation for the 111.04

== Specifications (Type AA / D.I / 111.03) ==
Data from Austro-Hungarian Army Aircraft of World War One, The Complete Book of Fighters

General characteristics

- Crew: 1
- Length: 6.35 m (20 ft 10 in)
- Wingspan: 7.6 m (24 ft 11 in)
- Height: 3 m (9 ft 10 in)
- Wing area: 20 m^{2} (220 sq ft)
- Empty weight: 623 kg (1,373 lb)
- Gross weight: 889 kg (1,960 lb)
- Max takeoff weight: 946 kg (2,086 lb)
- Powerplant: 1 × Austro-Daimler 6 cylinder water-cooled in-line piston engine, 138 kW (185 hp)

Performance

- Maximum speed: 175 km/h (109 mph, 94 kn)
- Range: 386 km (240 mi, 208 nmi)
- Time to altitude: 1,000 m (3,300 ft) in 2 minutes 40 seconds

Armament

- Guns: 2 x synchronized Schwarzlose machine guns

== See also ==
Aircraft of comparable role, configuration, and era

- Albatros D.Va
- Ansaldo SVA
- Fokker D.V
- Morane-Saulnier AI
- Nieuport 28
- Pfalz D.III
- Royal Aircraft Factory S.E.5
- Sopwith Camel
- SPAD S.XIII

Related lists

- List of fighter aircraft
- List of military aircraft of the Central Powers in World War I
