= Loving WR-1 Love =

Single-seat airplane

WR-1 Love
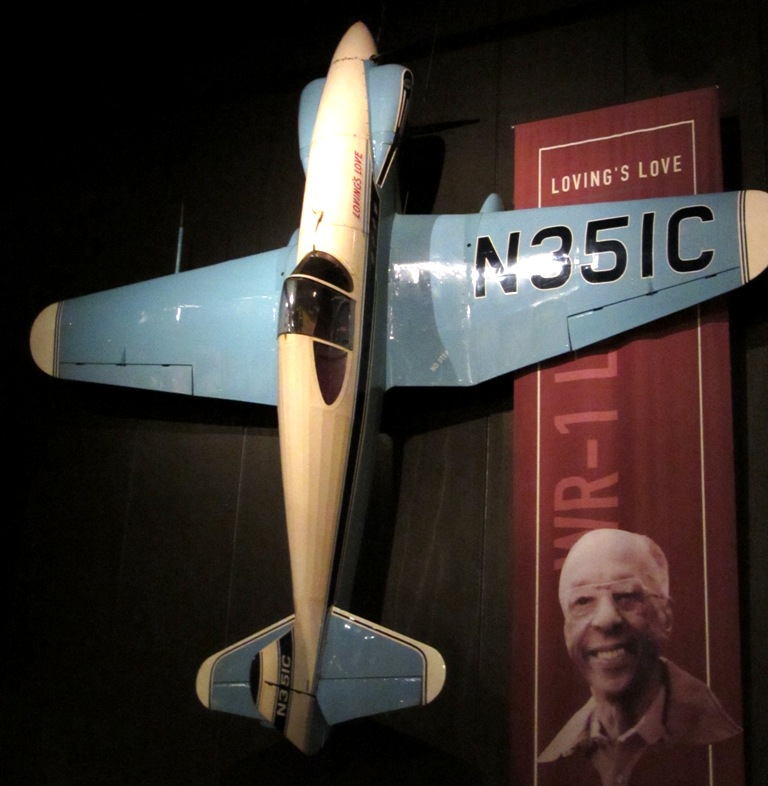
- The WR-1 on display

General information
- Type: Racing aircraft
- National origin: United States
- Manufacturer: Wayne Aircraft Company
- Designer: Neil Loving

History
- First flight: 7 August 1950

The Loving/Wayne WR-1 Love is a single seat, midget racer built in the 1950s.

== Design and development ==
The WR-1 is a single place, gull-winged aircraft with conventional landing gear. The fuselage uses wood truss construction with aircraft fabric covering. The all-wood, plywood covered gull-wing features faired, fixed landing gear at the lowest point. The design was submitted and approved by the professional racing pilots association in 1948 with construction starting in January 1949.

== Operational history ==
In the 1951 National Air Races pilot Neal Vernon Loving qualified with a 266 mph (428 km/h) dive. The aircraft's spinner separated, damaging the propeller.

In December 1953, Loving flew the WR-1 2200 miles from Detroit to Kingston, Jamaica, an unusually long trip for a new experimental design of the era.

In 1954, the design was the winner of the Most Outstanding Design award at the Experimental Aircraft Association Fly-in at Rockford, Illinois.

== Specifications (WR-1) ==
Data from EAA, Air Trails

General characteristics

- Crew: 1
- Length: 17 ft 2 in (5.23 m)
- Wingspan: 20 ft (6.1 m)
- Height: 4 ft 4 in (1.32 m)
- Wing area: 66 sq ft (6.1 m^{2})
- Empty weight: 613 lb (278 kg)
- Gross weight: 815 lb (370 kg)
- Fuel capacity: 15
- Powerplant: 1 × Continental C85 4-cyl. air-cooled horizontally-opposed piston engine, 85 hp (63 kW)
- Propellers: 2-bladed

Performance

- Maximum speed: 187 kn (215 mph, 346 km/h)
- Cruise speed: 135 kn (155 mph, 249 km/h)
- Stall speed: 50 kn (58 mph, 93 km/h)
- Range: 390 nmi (450 mi, 720 km)
- Service ceiling: 18,000 ft (5,500 m)
- Rate of climb: 2,100 ft/min (11 m/s)
