= LVG C.VIII =

German WWI prototype aircraft

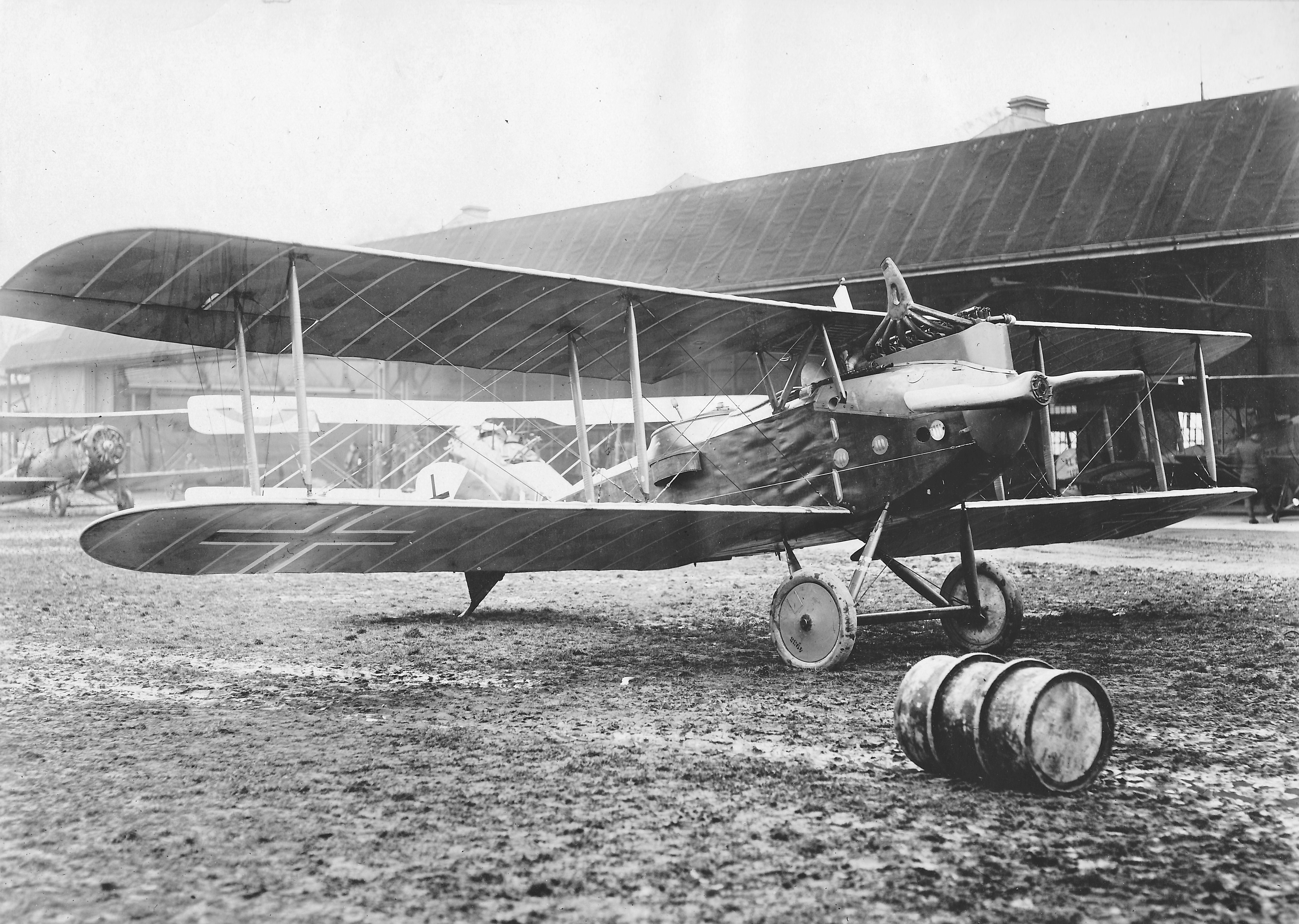

General information
- Type: Reconnaissance aircraft
- National origin: Germany
- Manufacturer: LVG (aircraft manufacturer)
- Number built: 1

History
- First flight: 1918

The LVG C.VIII was a prototype reconnaissance aircraft built in Germany during World War I.

== Design and development ==
The C.VIII was a conventional two-bay biplane design of its day, with unstaggered wings of equal span and tandem, open cockpits for the pilot and observer.

== Specifications ==
Data from German Aircraft of the First World War,

General characteristics

- Crew: 1
- Length: 7 m (23 ft 0 in)
- Wingspan: 13 m (42 ft 8 in)
- Height: 2.8 m (9 ft 2 in)
- Wing area: 35.7 m^{2} (384 sq ft)
- Empty weight: 975 kg (2,150 lb)
- Gross weight: 1,380 kg (3,042 lb)
- Powerplant: 1 × Benz Bz.IVü 6-cylinder water-cooled in-line high compression piston engine, 150 kW (200 hp) at sea level; (180 kW (240 hp) at rated altitude
- Propellers: 2-bladed fixed-pitch propeller

Performance

- Maximum speed: 165 km/h (103 mph, 89 kn)
- Endurance: 4 hours
- Service ceiling: 4,000 m (13,000 ft)

Armament

- Guns: 1 × fixed forward firing synchronised 7.92 mm (0.312 in) LMG 08/15 machine gun and 1 x flexibly mounted 7.92 mm (0.312 in) Parabellum MG 14 machine gun
