= Lombardi LM.5 =

LM.5, LM.7 Aviastar
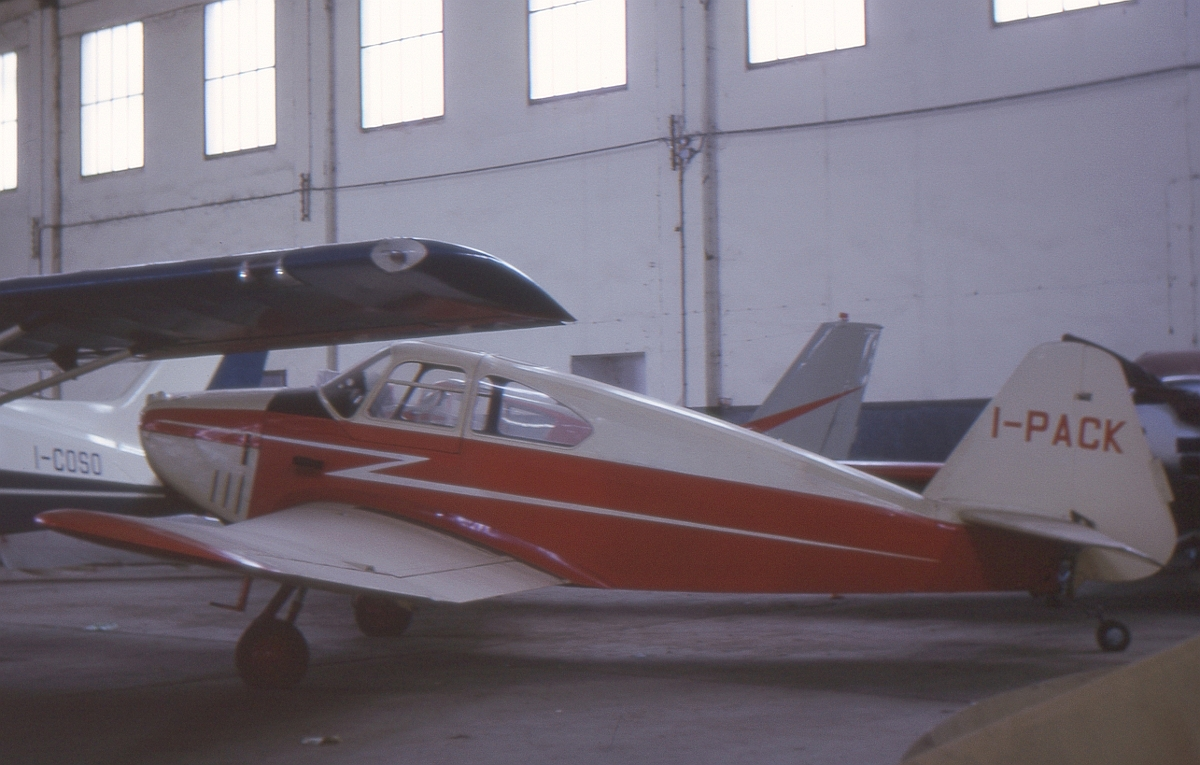
- The second of the two LM.7 three-seat light tourers to be completed during 1949 hangared at Milan's Bresso Airport in 1965

General information
- Type: Utility aircraft
- National origin: Italy
- Manufacturer: Lombardi
- Designer: Pieraldo Mortara
- Number built: 7

History
- First flight: 1945

The Lombardi LM.5 Aviastar was a two-seat light aircraft produced in Italy shortly after the Second World War, followed by a three-seat version called the LM.7.

== LM.5 Design and construction ==
It was a low wing, cantilever monoplane of conventional design and mixed construction. The main units of the tailwheel undercarriage were retractable, and the cabin was fully enclosed, offering side-by-side seating. The Italian press of the day nicknamed it Topolino dell'Aria ("Little mouse (Note: Topolino means "little mouse", but is also the Italian name of Mickey Mouse and the nickname of a ubiquitous model of Fiat automobile at the time - see Fiat Topolino) of the air").

== Operational history ==
An LM.5 (registration HB-UEM) was piloted to victory in the 1949 Tour Aerien de Suisse by Walter Spahni. (Note: "Souvenir of Switzerland", 496 – NB this article incorrectly states that the aircraft was of Czechoslovak manufacture, apparently confusing Lombardi's pre-war name of AVIA (Azionara Vercellese Industrie Aeronautiche) with the Czechoslovak aircraft manufacturer Avia. The error was noted in a subsequent edition of Flight (27 October 1949, p. 570).) The same year, however, the Lombardi firm ceased business, unable to sell its designs in the post-war marketplace. Only five examples of the LM.5 and two of the LM.7 had been built.

The LM.5 prototype (registered I-PIER, after its designer) was restored by Ali Romantiche at Sandigliano.

== LM.7 design and construction ==
The two Lombardi LM.7 aircraft were completed in 1949 and had a lengthened cabin accommodating two seats in the front with a single rear seat. The starboard and rear seats may be removed for the carriage of light freight. Ali Romantiche has also commenced the restoration of the LM.7 prototype (registration I-TTEN).

== Variants ==
- LM.5 - two-seat version with CNA D or Continental C90 engine
- LM.7 - three-seat version with Praga or Walter Minor engine

== Specifications (LM.5) ==
Data from The Aircraft of the World

General characteristics

- Crew: One pilot
- Capacity: 1 passenger
- Length: 6.15 m (20 ft 2 in)
- Wingspan: 11.14 m (36 ft 6 3/4 in)
- Height: 2.13 m (7 ft 0 in)
- Wing area: 14.45 m^{2} (155.5 sq ft)
- Gross weight: 620 kg (1,367 lb)
- Powerplant: 1 × Continental C90-12F , 67 kW (90 hp)

Performance

- Maximum speed: 206 km/h (128 mph, 111 kn)
- Cruise speed: 180 km/h (112 mph, 97 kn)
- Range: 770 km (480 mi, 420 nmi)
- Service ceiling: 5,300 m (17,500 ft)
