= Lohner B.VII =

Austro-Hungarian military plane

Lohner B.VII, C.I
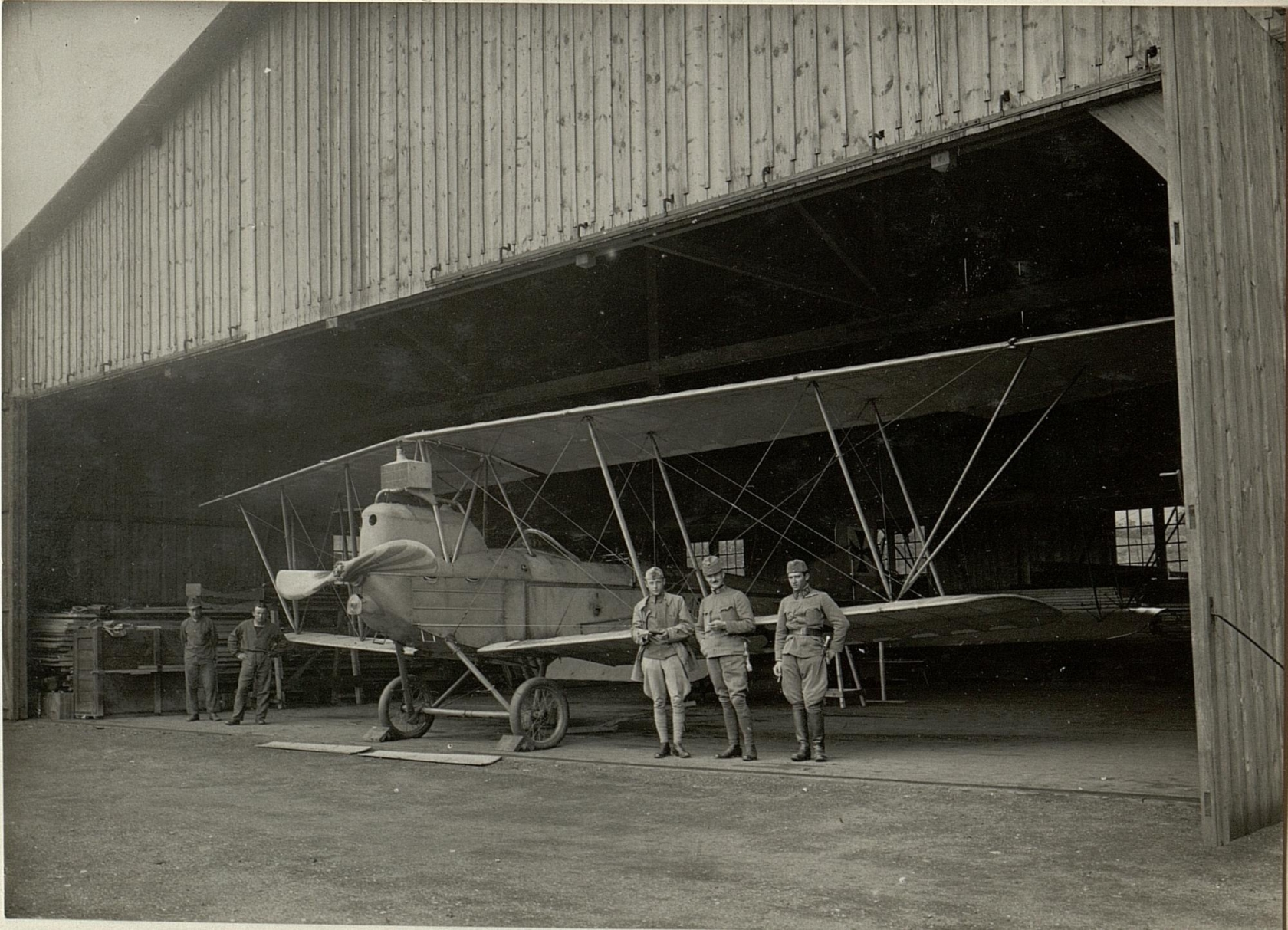
- Lohner B.VII (series 17)

General information
- Type: Reconnaissance aircraft
- National origin: Austria-Hungary
- Manufacturer: Lohner
- Primary user: KuKLFT

The unarmed Lohner B.VII and its armed derivative the C.I were military reconnaissance aircraft produced in Austria-Hungary during World War I. They were the ultimate developments in a family of aircraft that had begun with the B.I prior to the outbreak of war, and were the first members of that family that proved suitable for front-line service during the conflict. Like their predecessors, the B.VII and C.I were conventional biplanes with characteristic swept-back wings.

== Operational history ==
The B.VII appeared in August 1915 and finally provided a machine suitable for service use. These were used to conduct long-range reconnaissance missions over the Italian Front, as well as occasional bombing raids, carrying 80 kg (180 lb) of bombs internally. Many B.VIIs in operational service were equipped with machine guns on flexible mounts for the observer, and this led to the armed C.I version being produced at both the Lohner and Ufag factories. Aside from its factory-installed armament, the C.I also sported a streamlined cowling around the engine, whereas the B-types had their cylinders exposed to the airstream. Notable missions carried out by these aircraft included the raid on the Porta Volta power station in Milan on 14 February 1916 (a 378 km/276 mi round trip for 12 B.VIIs) and Julius Arigi sinking an Italian steamer at Valona in a B.VII in 1916.

Production of all versions ceased in 1917, and all were withdrawn from service soon afterwards.

== Variants ==
B.VII
unarmed version with 110 kW (150 hp) or 120 kW (160 hp) Austro Daimler engine (73 built)
B.VII(U)
Series 17.5: production by UFAG (Ungarische Flugzeugfabrik Abteil Gesellschaft / Ungarische Flugzeugwerke Aktien Gesellschaft): 48 built.
C.I
version with 120 kW (160 hp) Austro Daimler engine and armed with single machine gun on trainable mount for observer (40 built)

== Specifications ==
Data from Grosz 2002.

General characteristics

- Crew: Two, pilot and observer
- Length: 9.50 m (31 ft 2 in)
- Wingspan: 15.40 m (50 ft 6 in)
- Height: 3.75 m (12 ft 4 in)
- Wing area: 44.0 m^{2} (473 sq ft)
- Empty weight: 913 kg (2,000 lb)
- Powerplant: 1 × Austro-Daimler engine , 110 kW (150 hp)

Performance

- Endurance: 6 hours
- Rate of climb: 1.8 m/s (350 ft/min)
