= Hungarian Lloyd Aircraft and Engine Factory =

Defunct Austro-Hungarian aircraft and engine manufacturer

- Industry: Aircraft manufacture
- Founded: 1913
- Defunct: 1921
- Fate: Closed under Treaty of Trianon
- Headquarters: Aszód

The Hungarian Lloyd Aircraft and Motor Factory Corporation ( Hungarian: Magyar Lloyd Repülőgép- és Motorgyár Rt., German: Ungarische Lloyd Flugzeug und Motorenfabrik AG) was established in Aszód in 1913. The company started its operations in the factory building for the chassis and carpentry of the former Hungarian Royal Institute of Repair Workshop.

== History ==
The factory was established on the initiative of Hungarian and foreign interest groups under the name Magyar Lloyd Autómobil- és Motorgyár Rt.

Aircraft production started in 1914, with the Deutsche Flugzeug-Werke (D.F.W.) company entering the business with ten DFW B.I type semi-finished aircraft, in order to speed up assembly and production in the newly established factory. D.F.W. also sent pilot Henrik Bier to the new factory manager.

Hungarian engineers were entrusted with the management of the new plant.

When assembling the first DFW aircraft, the factory's engineers noticed that the machines had a very complicated structure, so they reworked the wing shape - also called "Flying Banana" because of the curved wings - to a straight-line, backward-arrowing structure.

== The first Lloyd aircraft ==
The factory in Aszód was given the monarchy's Aircraft Factory 4 mark, so the first prototype aircraft built here was given the mark 40.01. The first public appearance of the aircraft took place immediately after its completion. In June 1914, the aircraft was sent to Aspern for a demonstration, where it was entered in a flying competition on 27 July 1914 with a number 20. At the Aspern demonstration, the experimental aircraft, equipped with a 107 KW (145 HP) Hiero engine and piloted by director Heinrich Bier, climbed to a surprising 6,170 metres (20,240 ft), reaching a record altitude of 5,440 metres (17,850 ft) with a passenger, thus opening the way for the factory's aircraft and the production of the Lloyd 41 series.

In 1914, the Aspern race was the first to be reported in foreign-language journals, such as Zeitschrift Für Flugtechnik Und Motorluftschiffahrt, in July 1914, and an article in the Hungarian-language aviation magazine "Aero" appeared in 1916:

"The Hungarian Lloyd. " Almost in the last days of the peacetime, on 27 June 1914 in Aspern near Vienna, Lieutenant-General Bier Henrik reached an altitude of 6170 m with one passenger and set a world record! In addition to this undoubtedly great sporting achievement, we Hungarians were also affected by this brilliant achievement from another and closely related point of view. I.e. the plane on which Bier made this remarkable aerial excursion was a Hungarian plane, the very first one built by the Aszód workshops of Magyar Lloyd aircraft factory r. t. Aszód and, as the result showed, an excellent success."

The first Lloyd aircraft, which later became legendary, was taken over by the Imperial and Royal Command and put into service in the southern front immediately after the outbreak of the First World War. The aircraft operated for 2 years as a war machine, equipped with bombs and radio equipment, in addition to reconnaissance missions. The brave war pilots who flew the aircraft made numerous visits to the positions of Lovcen, Cetinje, Durazzo, Valona and Nis.

Most often, the pilots Captain Dworzák, Lieutenant Pieler and Sergeant Dobos flew this first Lloyd aircraft, many times at the greatest risk to their lives, as can be seen from the marks of hits from the shots on the fuselage and wings.

After two years of loyal service, the aircraft was returned to the factory, whose management donated this veteran aircraft, which is of great industrial, sporting and military importance, to the Royal Hungarian Transport Museum.

In 1917 the empty kite of the aircraft was exhibited at the Military Aircraft Exhibition and later at the Royal Transport Museum.

According to the Object Guide of the 1917 Military Aircraft Exhibition in the Industrial Exhibition Hall:

   Wingspan: 14.4 m 
   Length: 8,9 m 
   Height: 3,15 m 
   Take-off weight: 1060 kg 
   Maximum speed: 140 km/h 
   Engine: Hiero, 6-cylinder, 106 kW

== Aircraft variants produced by Lloyd ==
Between 1914 and 1916, the aircraft factory, which employed 400 people, largely produced versions of the successful first aircraft with various engines, serial numbers 41, 42 and 43.

These first aircraft were made of wood and covered with canvas, with the exception of the 40.01, which had a steel tube fuselage imported from Leipzig.

The design engineers at the Lloyd factory used the experience of the first war years to produce two versions of the 44 series, the second of which differed from the first in that instead of the previous canvas wing covering, the entire surface of the wings was covered with a thin layer of wooden sheeting, which greatly increased the stiffness of the wing, while at the same time increasing the surface smoothness, resulting in higher speed.

The Series 46, produced in 1917, was a completely revised new type. The Lloyd, which at that time was still a novelty, was fitted with a plywood cowling and was now powered by a 136 kW (185 hp) MÁG Daimler engine (this aircraft was also the first version of the two-seat fast-flyer). Given the success of the revised aircraft, the Flieger-Arsenal in Vienna ordered the production of the Hungarian-designed (Series 82) type by the Wiener Karosserie company. This type was later fitted with 162 kW (220 hp) engines from the MARTA factory in Arad and was equipped with both forward and rearward firing machine guns.

As at that time design and testing facilities were only available in Vienna, the managers of the Lloyd factory in Asde tried to make up for the lack of design and testing experience by building many experimental aircraft. Research in this direction has so far produced 16 experimental aircraft, which have been used to measure strength and flight characteristics. (The most interesting of these experiments was undoubtedly the one carried out during the tender for large aircraft (type G or Grossflugzeug type), when a giant three-engined, two-fuselage, three-deck aircraft (type 40.08) was built in six weeks, using largely parts from the existing aircraft. Unfortunately, the experiment was not a success, however, and the machine broke down on the first test.

By the end of 1917, however, the total production capacity of 20-24 aircraft per month was already made up of Austrian licence production of Aviatik C and D.I Berg reconnaissance and fighter aircraft.

Production of the Phönix C.I two-seat fast reconnaissance aircraft was due to start in the autumn of 1918, but by then the factory was already suffering from severe shortages of materials, so the first such aircraft could not be assembled until the Soviet Republic. The aircraft assembled at that time was the factory's 49 series, while the Aviatik C.I reconnaissance aircraft were designated 47 and the Aviatik (Berg) D.I fighters, which had been improved with a powerful engine, were designated 348.

== Fate ==
As a result of the total ban on aircraft production and military aviation in Hungary imposed by the Treaty of Trianon in the summer of 1920, the Aszód factory was destroyed in 1921, and at the same time the aircraft, their engines and documentation in Hungary were removed or destroyed by the Allied Control Commission.
