= H27 =

H27 may refer to:

- HMS Electra (H27), a Royal Navy E-class destroyer
- HMS H27, a British H-class submarine
- Lioré et Olivier LeO H-27, a French flying boat
