= Lioré et Olivier LeO 21 =

French biplane airliner and military transport

Lioré et Olivier LéO 21
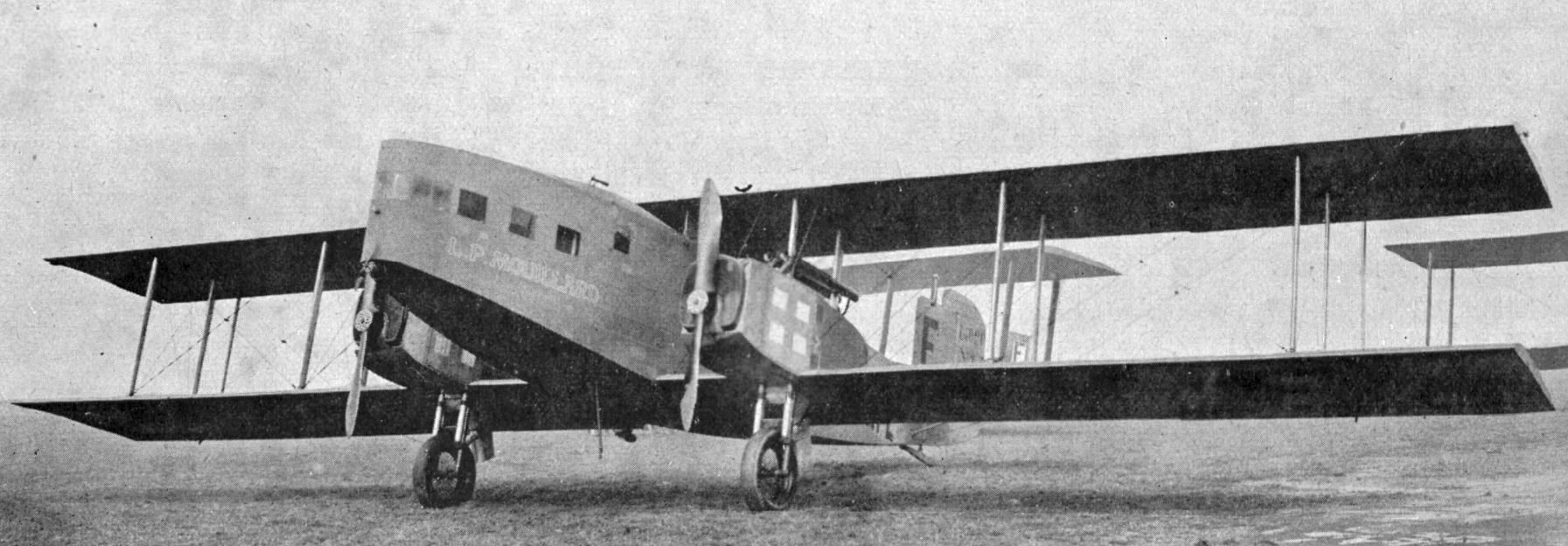

General information
- Type: Biplane airliner
- National origin: France
- Manufacturer: Lioré et Olivier

History
- First flight: 1926

The Lioré et Olivier LéO 21 was a 1920s French biplane airliner and later military transport based on the earlier LéO 20 night bomber.

== Development ==
First flown in August 1929 the LéO 21 was a twin-engined biplane airliner with a fixed tailskid landing gear. It retained the basic structure of the LéO 20 night bomber but with a new wider fuselage. It had room for six passengers in a nose cabin and a further 12 passengers in the main cabin with an open cockpit for the pilot.

The second LéO 21 was fitted with two 450 hp (336 kW) Renault 12Ja engines and re-designated as a LéO 212. It was converted by the Wagons-Lits company as a dining aircraft. The first LéO 21 became an avion-bar in 1929 and was re-designated LéO 211; it was later modified in 1931 with Renault engines as the LéO 213. One aircraft was produced as the LéO 21S fitted as a 10-stretcher ambulance. The first production LéO 213 was built in 1928 and a total of eleven were built and operated by Air Union on routes from Paris to London, Lyons, Marseilles and Geneva. The LéO 213 had an increased wingspan, improved sound proofing and three baggage holds. When modified for night services they were re-designated as LéO 213N. In 1934 all the surviving LéO 213s were bought by the Armée de l'Air (French Air Force) and were converted to transports for 14-troops on bench seats and re-designated LéO 214.

== Variants ==
LeO 21
Prototype powered by 2x 310 kW (420 hp) Gnome & Rhône 9Ab Jupiter engines
LeO 211
First prototype modified
LeO 212
Second prototype fitted with 2x 340 kW (450 hp) Renault 12Ja engines.
LeO 213
Production version with Renault 12Ja engines, some redesignated LéO 213N for night use.
LeO 214
Military conversions from LéO 213 for the Armée de l'Air.
LeO 21S
Air ambulance, one built.

== Accidents and incidents ==
- On 25 July 1930, LeO 21 F-AIZO Golden Ray/Rayon d'Or of Air Union made a forced landing at Snave, Kent following an engine failure. The aircraft was subsequently dismantled and removed to Hythe, Kent.

== Operators ==
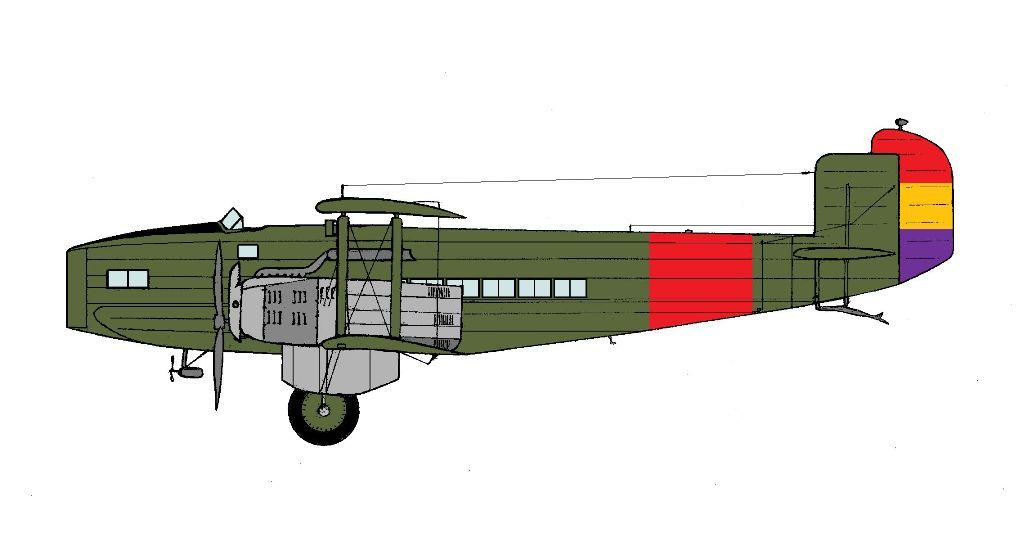
LeO 213 Spanish Republican AF

France

- Air Union
- French Air Force

Spain

- Spanish Republican Air Force - Lioré et Olivier 213

== Specifications (LeO 214) ==
Data from

General characteristics

- Crew: 1
- Capacity: 14 troops
- Length: 15.55 m (51 ft 0.25 in)
- Wingspan: 23.03 m (75 ft 6.75 in)
- Height: 4.50 m (14 ft 9.25 in)
- Wing area: 108 m^{2} (1,162.54 sq ft)
- Empty weight: 3,440 kg (7,584 lb)
- Gross weight: 5,700 kg (12,566 lb)
- Powerplant: 2 × Renault 12Ja V-12 piston engines , 336 kW (450 hp) each

Performance

- Maximum speed: 190 km/h (118 mph, 103 kn)
- Range: 560 km (348 mi, 302 nmi)
- Service ceiling: 4,500 m (14,765 ft)

== See also ==
Related development

- Lioré et Olivier LeO 20

Related lists

- List of Interwar military aircraft
- List of military aircraft of France

== Bibliography ==
- Hartmann, Gérard. Les Avions Lioré Et Olivier. Boulogne-Billancourt, France: ETAI. 2002. ISBN 2-7268-8607-8 (in French)
- Taylor, Michael J. H. (1989). Jane's Encyclopedia of Aviation. London: Studio Editions.
- The Illustrated Encyclopedia of Aircraft (Part Work 1982-1985). Orbis Publishing.
