= Lioré et Olivier LeO H-23-2 =

LeO H-23-2
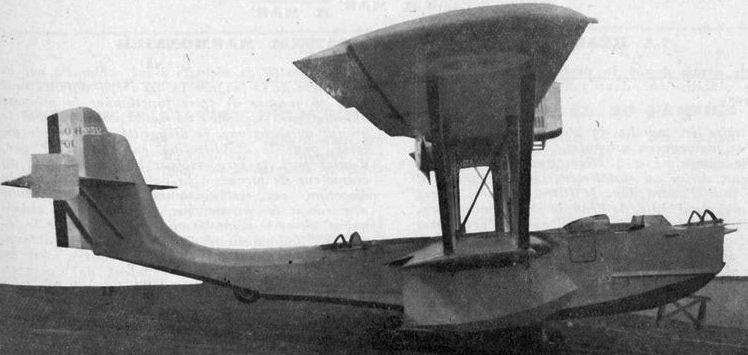

General information
- Type: Amphibious reconnaissance flying boat
- National origin: France
- Manufacturer: Lioré et Olivier
- Primary user: Venezuelan Army Air Service
- Number built: 4

History
- First flight: 1932

The Lioré et Olivier H-23-2 was an amphibious maritime reconnaissance flying boat, built in France in 1932. Three were produced for the Venezuelan Army Air Service.

== Design ==
Despite having the same roles and being amphibious flying boats sharing essentially the same engine and very similar designations, the Lioré et Olivier LeO H-23 and the LeO H-23-2 were very different aircraft. Most obviously, the former was a tractor configuration monoplane and the latter a pusher sesquiplane, but there were many other differences.

In terms of span the LeO H-23-2 was a true sesquiplane, with a lower wing span close to half that of the upper wing. The lower wing was also narrower and the ratio of wing areas was about 3:1. The upper wing had a centre-section filling 63% of the span and two outer panels; all sections were essentially rectangular, though the wingtips were slightly blunted. Narrow ailerons filled the trailing edges of the outer panels. The lower wing was mounted from the top of the hull. Both upper and lower wings combined wood and metal construction, had two spars and were fabric covered with plywood leading edges. They were braced together on each side with struts from the lower wingtips with two parallel pairs of streamlined struts, one pair leaning outwards and the other inwards; wire cross bracing strengthened the structure. A pair of N-form struts supported both the inner upper wing and the centrally positioned, pusher configuration, 541 kW (725 hp) Hispano-Suiza 12Nbr liquid-cooled V12 engine. The engine sat on the wing in a flat-sided cowling, with its honeycomb radiator at the front and a three-bladed propeller working in a rectangular cut-out in the trailing edge.

The LeO H-23-2 had a wooden framed hull covered in birch plywood. Its planing bottom had a convex V-section quite different from the softly curved underside of the LeO H-23. There were two steps, one under the wings and the other at about two-thirds of the way back from the reinforced nose. Single-stepped floats, each mounted on two pairs of short struts from the tips of the lower wings ensured lateral stability on water. In the nose was an open position from which a crew member could take observations or bearings, assist with mooring or, in event of attack, uses a pair of machine guns on a flexible mounting. He could also release four bombs, held under the lower wings. Immediately behind this position was the pilots' open cockpit, which had side-by-side seats equipped with dual controls. Their seats were well separated to allow access to the front post via a door and had their own fuselage openings, windscreens and headrests. Passage rearwards between the seats led to a large cabin with windows for observation, containing radio equipment, a mapping table and a camera mounted for vertical or oblique photographs. Behind that was a dorsal gun position with another pair of flexibly mounted machine guns.

Aft of the rear step, the hull became slender and then blended into a tall fin. Some images show the rudder unbalanced and the same height as the fin but others show a taller balanced rudder. At some point after the rudder was balanced, small auxiliary fins were added to the tailplane tips. The tailplane was mounted over halfway up the central fin, each side braced from below by a pair of parallel struts.

The LeO H-23-2 was an amphibious aircraft with conventional tailwheel landing gear. Each wheel, fitted with low pressure tyres and brakes, was on a cranked axle with a drag strut, both hinged from the hull side, and another leg which was vertical when the gear was down; the fuselage hinge also mounted an inverse V-strut, its vertex on the top of the vertical leg. All three joined the bottom end of an oblique Messier retracting shock absorber which projected inwards above the wing. Retracted, the wheel was exposed under the wing, at about 30° to it. The castoring tailwheel was attached just aft of the rear step and had a rubber shock absorber.

== Development ==
The LeO H-23-2 was afloat by May 1932 though the date of the first flight is not known. It appeared at the 13th Paris Aero Salon in November 1932. Since 1920 France had aeronautical connections with Venezuela and supplied most of their military aircraft from about 1920 to 1935. The LeO H-23-2 attracted their Salon delegation's interest and an order for three followed. These had some modifications to the float depth and to the engine cowling. Unusually, the aircraft were paid for with sacks of coffee beans. They went on to serve their country well.

Little is known about the career of the prototype, though when it flew at a display of naval aircraft in March 1936 it was described as a trainer. (Note: The article describes the type as a LeO-23 but by that time the earlier design had crashed; other examples of this confusion appear elsewhere in the French literature.)

== Operators ==
- Venezuela Venezuelan Army Air Service

== Specifications ==
Data from Les Ailes September 1933

General characteristics

- Length: 13.72 m (45 ft 0 in)
- Upper wingspan: 21.30 m (69 ft 11 in)
- Lower wingspan: 10.20 m (33 ft 6 in)
- Height: 5.20 m (17 ft 1 in)
- Wing area: 66 m^{2} (710 sq ft)
- Empty weight: 2,380 kg (5,247 lb)
- Gross weight: 4,000 kg (8,818 lb)
- Max takeoff weight: 4,800 kg (10,582 lb)
- Fuel capacity: 750 kg (1,650 lb)
- Powerplant: 1 × Hispano-Suiza 12Nbr liquid-cooled V12, geared down 2:1, pusher configuration, 541 kW (725 hp) 480 kW (650 hp) nominal
- Propellers: 3-bladed

Performance

- Maximum speed: 210 km/h (130 mph, 110 kn) at ground level
- Range: 1,200 km (750 mi, 650 nmi)
- Service ceiling: 5,200 m (17,100 ft)
- Time to altitude: 18 min 27 sec to 3,000 m (9,800 ft)
- Minimum speed: 90 km/h (56 mph; 49 kn)

Armament

- Pairs of machine guns on flexible mounts in both nose and dorsal positions.
