= Lioré et Olivier LeO 25 =

LeO 25
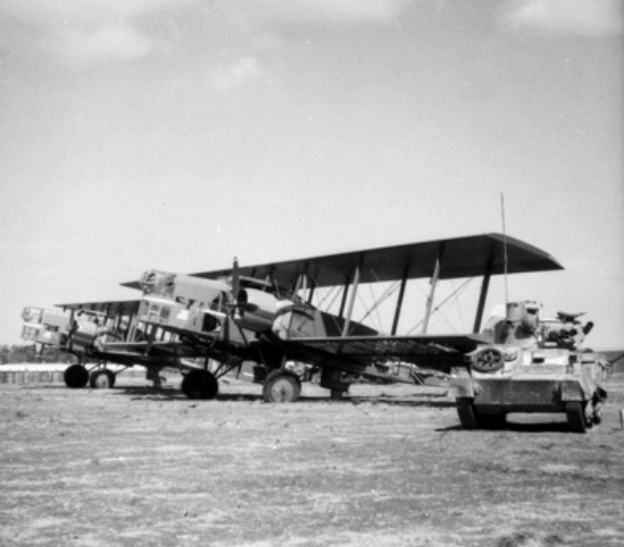

General information
- Type: Bomber
- National origin: France
- Manufacturer: Lioré et Olivier
- Primary user: Aéronavale

History
- First flight: 1928

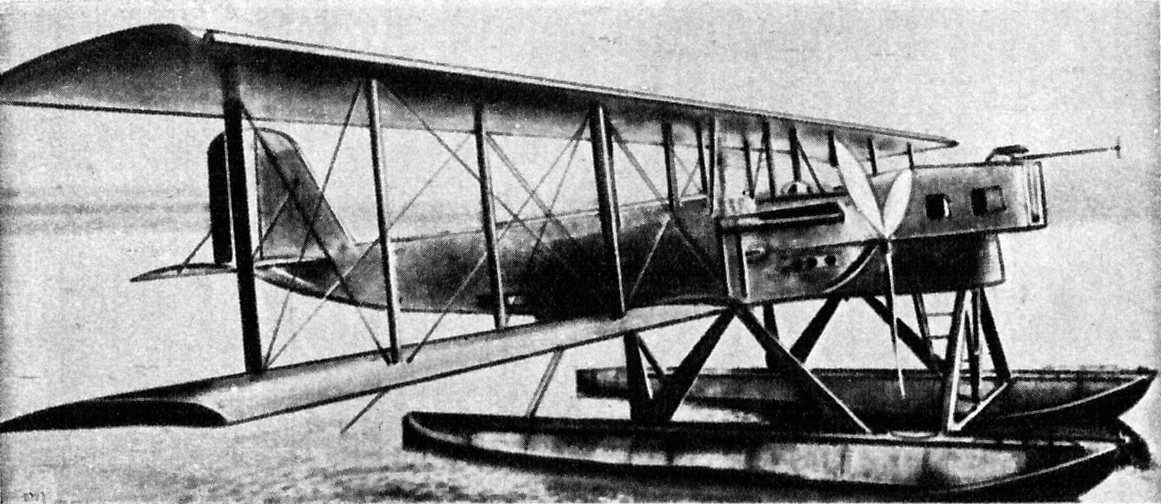
LeO H-256

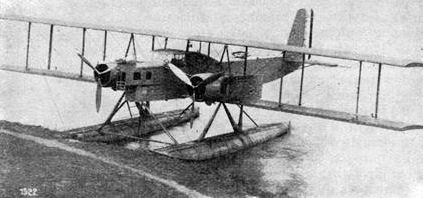
LeO H.257 photo from L'Aerophile February 1934

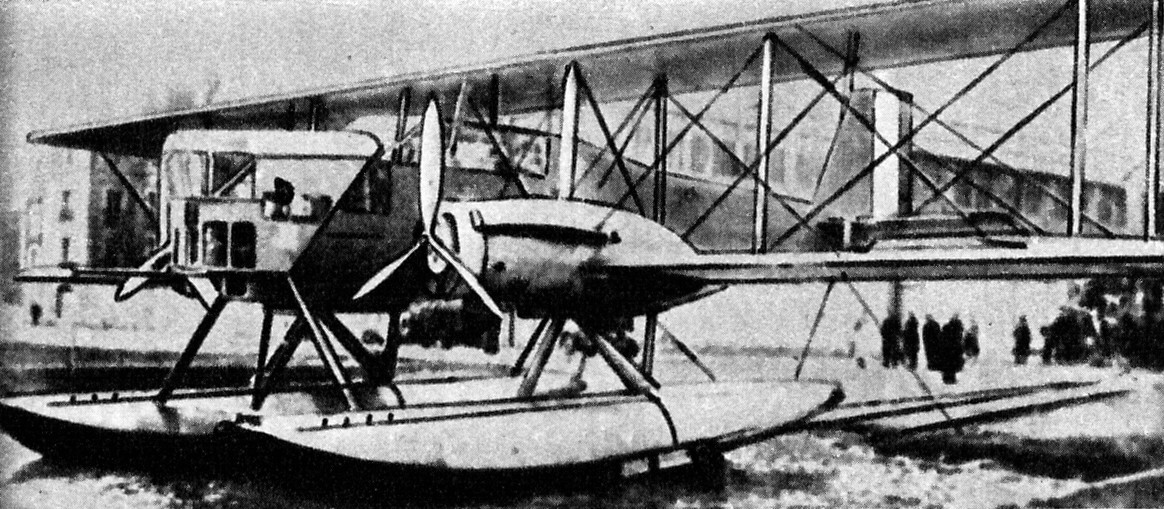
LeO H-259

The Lioré et Olivier LeO 25 was a bomber aircraft produced in France in the late 1920s.

== Design and development ==
The LeO 25 was a development of the LeO 20 and retained much of that aircraft's structure, adding a new tail and liquid-cooled engines. The prototype was delivered to the Aéronautique Militaire amongst a batch of LeO 20s in 1928 for evaluation. This was redesignated LeO 252 in 1929 after an engine change, and a second, generally similar machine was purchased by Romania.

In 1931, the LeO 252 remaining in France was fitted with wooden floats and handed over to the Aéronavale, forming the pattern for the majority of LeO 25s which would be produced as seaplanes. The only other members of the family to be built with wheeled undercarriage were three LeO 253s purchased by Brazil in 1931, and which would see service in the Constitutionalist Revolution the following year, and the sole LeO 255 which would later be fitted with floats. This latter machine was equipped with supercharged engines and was used to set a number of height-with-load records for seaplanes.

The only versions produced in quantity were the LeO H-257bis and LeO H-258, which together represented orders for 86 units from the Aéronavale. Entering service in June 1935, they flew neutrality patrols during the Spanish Civil War and some remained in service at the outbreak of the Second World War. These surviving aircraft flew convoy escort and anti-submarine patrols in September 1939 before being used as tactical bombers against land targets during the Blitzkrieg, suffering heavy losses. Fifty-three remained on strength with Vichy forces in August 1940, and these were used for secondary roles such as training and target towing until 1944.

== Variants ==
- LeO 25 - landplane night bomber with Hispano-Suiza 12Hb engines (1 prototype)
- LeO 252 - landplane bomber with Hispano-Suiza 12Mbr engines (1 built, one converted from LeO 25)
- LeO 253 - landplane bomber similar to LeO 252 (3 built)
- LeO H-254 - dedicated seaplane version of LeO 252 (2 built)
- LeO H-255 - record-setting version of LeO H-254 with supercharged Hispano-Suiza 12Xbrs engines (1 built)
- LeO H-256 - version of H-254 with extended wingspan (1 built)
- LeO H-257 - modified version for Aéronavale with Gnome-Rhône 14Kbrs engines and enclosed cockpit for pilot (1 built)
  - LeO H-257bis - production version of H-257 with Gnome-Rhône 14Kirs / Gnome-Rhône 14Kjrs engines, strengthened airframe, and enclosed nose gun position (60 built)
- LeO H-258 - interim version similar to H-257bis but with Hispano-Suiza 12Nbr engines, supplied to Aéronavale while H-257bis production was being undertaken (26 built)
- LeO 259 - version with Hispano-Suiza 12Ydrs / Hispano-Suiza 12Yfrs engines (1 built)

== Operators ==
Brazil

- Brazilian Air Force - 3 × LeO 253

France

- Aéronavale
- Armée de l'Air
- Escadrille 3B1
- Escadrille 3B2
- Escadrille B-1
- Escadrille B-2
- Escadrille B-3
- Escadrille E.7
- Escadrille 3S4
- Groupe de Bombardement II/25

Vichy France

- Vichy French Air Force

Kingdom of Romania

- Royal Romanian Air Force - 1 × LeO 252

== Specifications (LeO H-257bis) ==
Data from

General characteristics

- Crew: 4
- Length: 17.54 m (57 ft 7 in)
- Wingspan: 25.5 m (83 ft 8 in)
- Height: 6.8 m (22 ft 4 in)
- Wing area: 133.5 m^{2} (1,437 sq ft)
- Empty weight: 4,750 kg (10,472 lb)
- Gross weight: 9,380 kg (20,679 lb)
- Powerplant: 1 × Gnome-Rhône 14Kirs 14-cyl. air-cooled radial piston engine, 650 kW (870 hp) LH rotation fitted to starboard
- Powerplant: 1 × Gnome-Rhône 14Kjrs 14-cyl. air-cooled radial piston engine, 650 kW (870 hp) RH rotation fitted to port

Performance

- Maximum speed: 241 km/h (150 mph, 130 kn)
- Range: 2,000 km (1,200 mi, 1,100 nmi)
- Service ceiling: 8,000 m (26,000 ft)

Armament

- Guns: 3 × 7.5 mm (0.30 in) Darne machine guns
- Bombs: 700 kg (1,500 lb) of bombs or 1 × DA torpedo

== See also ==
Related lists

- List of Interwar military aircraft
