= Lioré et Olivier LeO H-246 =

Four-engined flying boat

LeO H-246
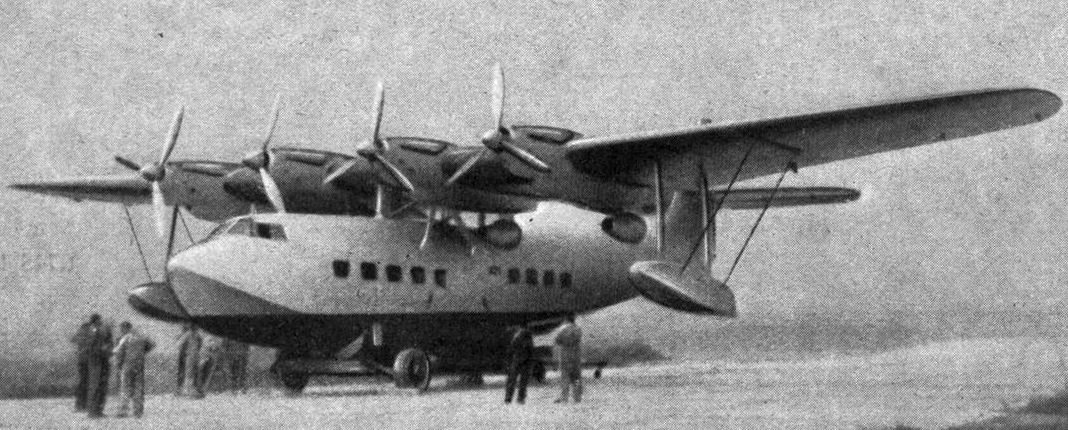

General information
- Type: Transport flying boat
- National origin: France
- Manufacturer: Lioré-et-Olivier; Sud-Est
- Primary users: Air France Luftwaffe
- Number built: 6

History
- Introduction date: 1939
- First flight: 30 September 1937
- Retired: 1946

The Sud-Est LeO H-246 was a large four-engined flying boat from the late 1930s.

== Development and design ==
The LeO H-246 was designed by the French aircraft manufacturer Lioré-et-Olivier to meet a 1935 specification for a commercial flying boat for use on the Mediterranean routes of Air France. It was a four-engined parasol monoplane of mixed construction and powered by four 720 hp (537 kW) Hispano-Suiza 12Xir liquid cooled V12 engines. All four engines were mounted in streamlined nacelles ahead of the leading edge of the wing. It had a duralumin hull which was of similar layout to that of Lioré et Olivier's H-47; it had seats for 26 passengers, and a crew of four.

The prototype H-246.01 (Lioré et Olivier's factories had been nationalised at the end of 1936, so the aircraft was built by Sud-Est) made its maiden flight from the Étang de Berre on 30 September 1937. Air France placed an order for six H-246.1 aircraft in January 1938, with the prototype also being brought up to production standard for commercial service.

== Operational history ==
The refurbished prototype and the first production aircraft were being readied for commercial service when the Second World War broke out in September 1939. The French Navy drew up plans to requisition the H-246s as maritime patrol aircraft, but Air France still needed them, and the Navy agreed to take over only four of the aircraft. This allowed Air France to commence operations with the prototype on the Marseille–Algiers route on 14 October 1939.

The third production aircraft was completed for the Navy in June 1940, with a glazed position in the nose for a bombardier/navigator, bomb racks below the wings and four 7.5 mm Darne machine guns as defensive armament. It entered service with Escadrille 9E on 25 August 1940, the only aircraft of the type actually to be operated by the French Navy, with the remaining aircraft going to Air France.

In November 1942, the Allies landed in French North Africa and, in response, German forces occupied Vichy France. They seized the single French Navy H-246, along with three Air France aircraft. Two more Air France aircraft were at Algiers at the time and so escaped seizure by the Germans. (The prototype H.246 had been withdrawn from use in 1941).

The German Luftwaffe took over the three seized ex-Air France aircraft, fitting them with five MG 15 machine guns as defensive armament and carrying up to 21 soldiers or 14 stretchers. The aircraft were used for various tasks, including transport in Finland. The ex-French Navy H-246 was destroyed at Lyon by Allied attacks in the spring of 1944. After the war, the two surviving H-246s were used by Air France to restart the Marseille–Algiers service, continuing in use until September 1946.

== Operators ==
France

- Air France received 6 aircraft.
- French Navy

Vichy France

- Vichy French Air Force operated aircraft taken over from Air France.

Germany

- Luftwaffe operated 4 aircraft captured in Vichy France.

== Specifications (H-246.1) ==
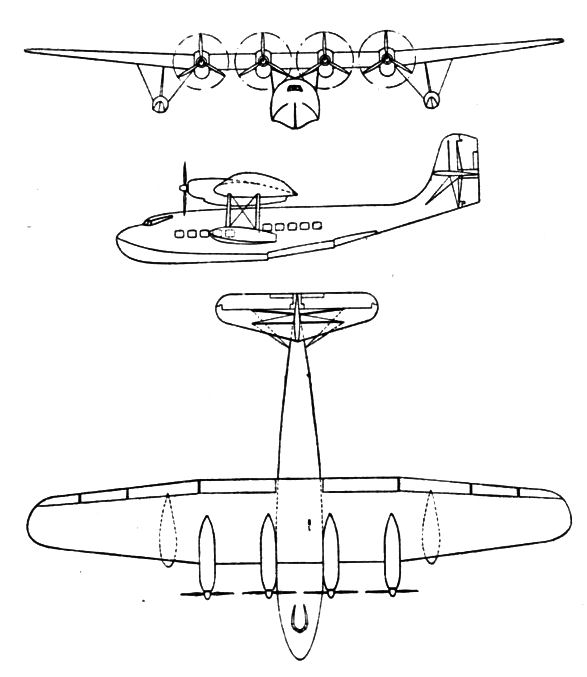
LeO H.246 3-view drawing from L'Aerophile November 1937

Data from The Encyclopedia of World Aircraft

General characteristics

- Crew: 4–5
- Capacity: 26 passengers or
  21 soldiers. or
  14 stretchers.
- Length: 21.17 m (69 ft 5 in)
- Wingspan: 31.72 m (104 ft 1 in)
- Height: 7.15 m (23 ft 5 in)
- Wing area: 131 m^{2} (1,410 sq ft)
- Empty weight: 9,800 kg (21,605 lb)
- Max takeoff weight: 15,000 kg (33,069 lb)
- Powerplant: 2 × Hispano-Suiza 12Xirs V-12 liquid-cooled piston engines, 537 kW (720 hp) each LH rotation fitted to starboard (#3 and #4)
- Powerplant: 2 × Hispano-Suiza 12Xjrs V-12 liquid-cooled piston engines, 537 kW (720 hp) each RH rotation fitted to port (#1 and #2)
- Propellers: 3-bladed constant-speed propellers

Performance

- Maximum speed: 330 km/h (210 mph, 180 kn)
- Cruise speed: 255 km/h (158 mph, 138 kn)
- Range: 2,000 km (1,200 mi, 1,100 nmi)
- Service ceiling: 7,000 m (23,000 ft)

Armament

- Guns: 4 x 7.5 mm Darne machine guns or 5 x MG 15 machine guns

== See also ==
- Lioré et Olivier LeO H-242
- List of aircraft of World War II

== Bibliography ==
- Bousquet, Gérard. French Flying Boats of WW II. Sandomierz, Poland: Stratus, 2013 ISBN 978-83-63678-06-7
- Donald, David. The Encyclopedia of World Aircraft. Leicester, UK: Blitz Editions, 1997. ISBN 1-85605-375-X
- Green, William. War Planes of the Second World War: Volume Five Flying Boats. London, Macdonald, 1968. ISBN 0-356-01449-5
- Hartmann, Gérard. Les Avions Lioré Et Olivier. Boulogne-Billancourt, France: ETAI. 2002. ISBN 2-7268-8607-8 (in French)
- Nicolaou, Stéphane. Boats & Seaplanes: A History Since 1905. Bideford, UK: Bay View Books, 1998. ISBN 1-901432-20-3.
- "Plane Facts: LeO in Finland". Air International August 1972, Vol 3 No 2. pp. 106–107
- Stroud, John. "Wings of Peace: Lioré et Olivier H 46 and H 246". Aeroplane Monthly. January 1992. London: IPC, pp. 48–52
