= Lioré et Olivier LeO H-15 =

LeO H-15
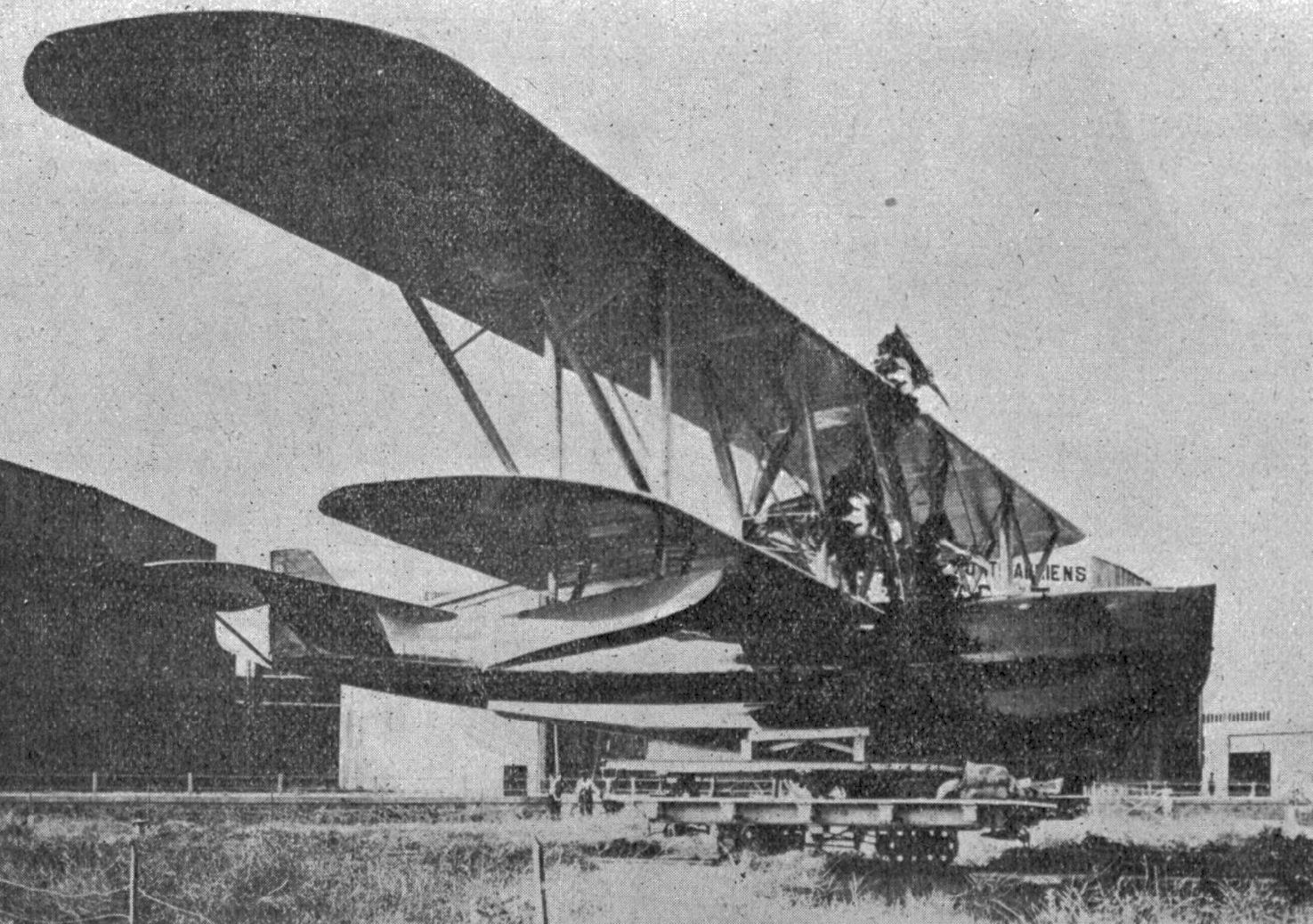

General information
- Type: Transport aircraft
- National origin: France
- Manufacturer: Lioré et Olivier
- Number built: 1

History
- First flight: 10 June 1926

The Lioré et Olivier Leo H-15 was a French twelve-seat civil flying boat, flown in a national contest in 1926. It did not win but set two load carrying records, one a world record.

== Design and development ==
In 1926 the French government offered large prizes in a contest to produce new, multi-engined commercial seaplanes. Compared with similar landplane competitions, few manufacturers offered a candidate; at the trials, held in July and August only the Lioré et Olivier LeO H-15 and the SPCA Météore 63 took part.

The LeO H-15 was a three-engined biplane with high aspect ratio, thin section wings of unequal span. The shorter span lower wing, with slight dihedral, was built into the hull and the upper wing was mounted on it without stagger or dihedral. The interplane struts were in parallel pairs, two outward leaning and two vertical outboard, and an interconnected central complex which both braced the wings and mounted two of its three 310 kW (420 hp) Gnome & Rhône 9Ab nine cylinder radial engines close inboard between the wings. The other was mounted on the upper wing over the hull.

Its hull had two steps, one under the wing trailing edge and the second further aft. The underside had a rounded, rather than V, section and was wider than its upper part. The pilot was positioned in an open cockpit just ahead of the leading edge of the wing and a "luxurious" passenger cabin, accommodating twelve, was accessed via a hatch in the nose. On each side a stabilizing float was mounted below the lower wing on extensions of the outer interplane struts, strengthened with another, inward pair.

The LeO H-15's fin was part of the hull and was roughly triangular in profile. It carried a vertical-edged, balanced rudder which extended to the lower fuselage. A rectangular plan tailplane was mounted on the fin a little way above the fuselage, braced on each side with a parallel pair of struts to the lower fuselage and wires from the upper fin; like the rudder, the elevators were balanced.

== Operational history ==
The LeO H-15 first flew on 10 June 1926, less than six weeks before the start of the trials on July 19 at Saint-Raphaël. It was required to achieve its Certificate of Airworthiness two days before the trials to take part. Its trials pilot was Lt. de Vaisseau Benoit. The Météore out-performed the LeO in the commercial flight tests and was judged safer and more comfortable for the passengers, though its take-offs took longer, it climbed more slowly and was less seaworthy. As a result, the Météore received the first prize of 100,000 francs and the LeO the 20,000 francs second prize.

During the trials the LeO H-15 set two records, both for aircraft carrying a load of 500 kg (1,100 lb). The first was a world duration record of 4 h 32 min 11 s and the second a French speed record over 500 km (310 mi) at 130.86 km/h (81.31 mph; 70.66 kn).

== Specifications ==
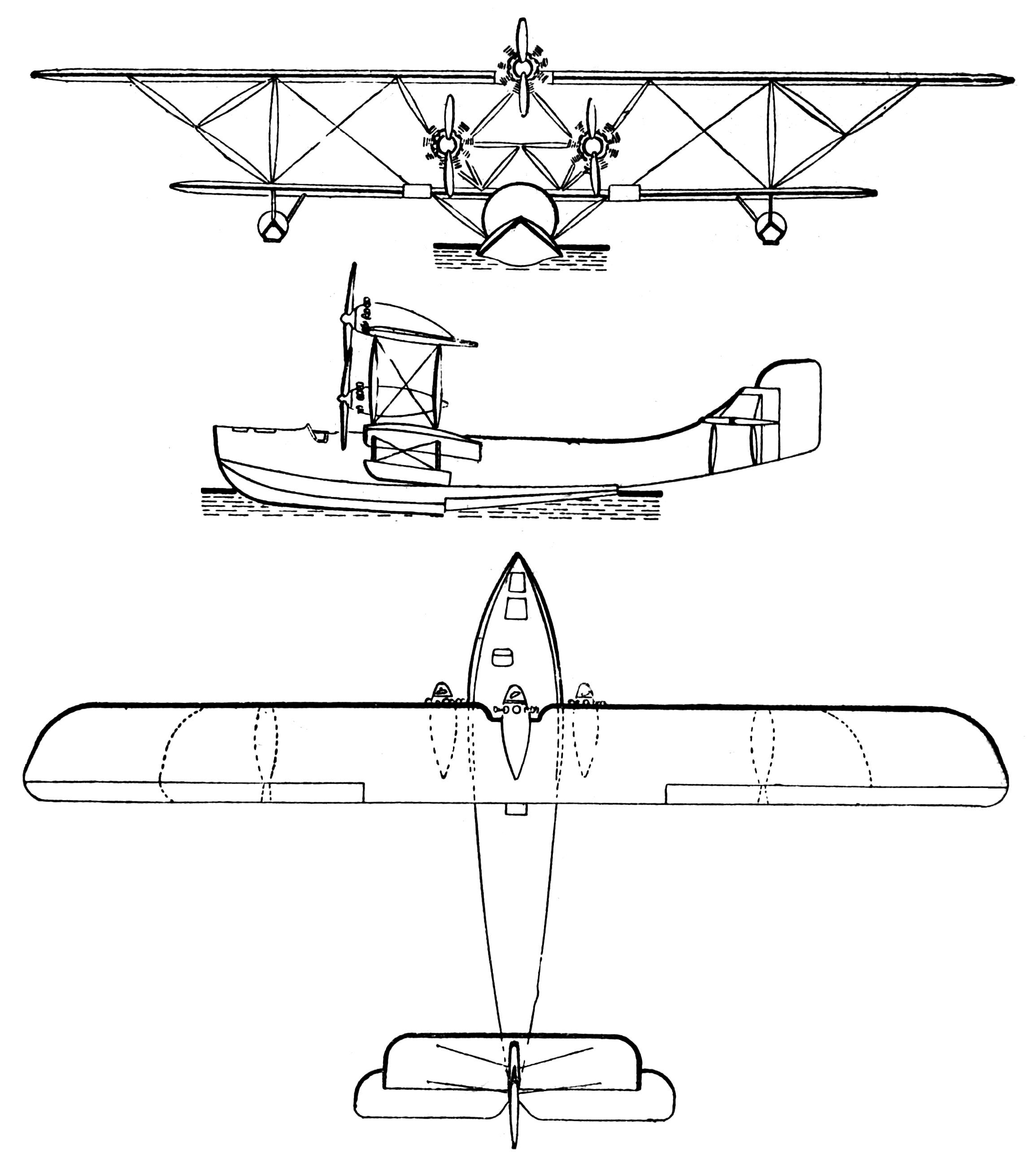
Lioré et Olivier LeO H-15 3-view drawing from Les Ailes July 8, 1926

Data from Les Ailes, July 1926

General characteristics

- Capacity: twelve passengers
- Length: 16.95 m (55 ft 7 in)
- Upper wingspan: 28.10 m (92 ft 2 in)
- Lower wingspan: 20.50 m (67 ft 3 in)
- Height: 6.10 m (20 ft 0 in)
- Wing area: 136.24 m^{2} (1,466.5 sq ft)
- Empty weight: 3,950 kg (8,708 lb)
- Gross weight: 6,645 kg (14,650 lb)
- Powerplant: 3 × Gnome & Rhône 9Ab 9-cylinder radial, 310 kW (420 hp) each (Bristol Jupiter built under licence)
- Propellers: 2-bladed

Performance

- Cruise speed: 150 km/h (93 mph, 81 kn)
