= Lioré et Olivier LeO 9 =

1920s French fighter aircraft

LeO 9

General information
- Type: Fighter
- National origin: France
- Manufacturer: Lioré et Olivier
- Number built: 1

History
- First flight: 1923

The Lioré et Olivier LeO 9 was a French monoplane fighter built in 1923.

== Design and development ==
The LeO 9 was a low wing monoplane fighter of all-metal construction using a Joukowski aerofoil. Despite excelling in flight tests, the LeO 9 was not ordered into production.

== Specifications ==
Data from

General characteristics

- Crew: one
- Length: 6.59 m (21 ft 7 in)
- Wingspan: 10.94 m (35 ft 11 in)
- Height: 2.18 m (7 ft 2 in)
- Wing area: 17 m^{2} (180 sq ft)
- Airfoil: Joukowski airfoil
- Gross weight: 1,175 kg (2,590 lb)
- Powerplant: 1 × Hispano-Suiza 8Fb 8-cylinder V-shaped liquid cooled, 220 kW (300 hp)
- Propellers: 2-bladed

Performance

- Maximum speed: 280 km/h (170 mph, 150 kn)at sea level
- Service ceiling: 7,000 m (23,000 ft)

== Bibliography ==
- Hartmann, Gérard. Les Avions Lioré Et Olivier. Boulogne-Billancourt, France: ETAI. 2002. ISBN 2-7268-8607-8 (in French)
- Riccio, Philippe (November–December 2019). "De l'avion Eiffel au LeO 9: Le chasseur trop en avance sur son temps" [From the Eiffel Aircraft to the LeO 9: The Fighter Too Far in Advance of Its Time]. Avions (in French) (232): 67–79. ISSN 1243-8650.
