= Lioré et Olivier =

Aircraft manufacturer

Lioré-et-Olivier
- Industry: Aeronautics, defence
- Founded: 1912
- Founder: Fernand Lioré & Henri Olivier
- Defunct: 1 February 1937
- Fate: Merged
- Successor: SNCASE
- Headquarters: France
- Products: Aircraft

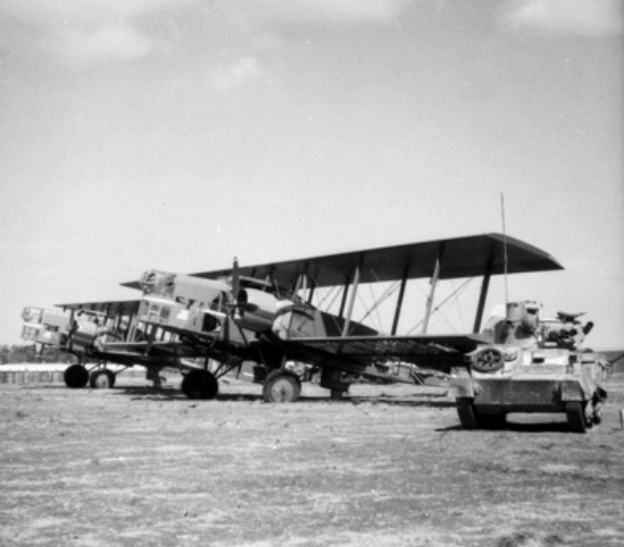
Two LeO 25 bombers at Aleppo.

Lioré-et-Olivier was a French manufacturer of aircraft of the 20th century, founded in 1912 by Fernand Lioré and Henri Olivier.

== History ==
The Société de Constructions Aéronautiques d'hydravions Lioré-et-Olivier had three factories, located in Argenteuil, Clichy, Hauts-de-Seine and Rochefort, Charente-Maritime.

The company was nationalized in 1936, following which it was merged with Chantiers aéronavals Étienne Romano, Potez, CAMS and SPCA in order to form the Société nationale des constructions aéronautiques du Sud-Est (SNCASE) on 1 February 1937. The factory at Rochefort, however, went into SNCASO.

== Aircraft designs ==
- Lioré et Olivier LeO 1: Sopwith 1½ Strutter built under license.
- Lioré et Olivier LeO 3: fighter, 1917 (project).
- Lioré et Olivier LeO 4: reconnaissance aircraft, 1917 (project).
- Lioré et Olivier LeO 5: Three-seat heavy armored ground attack biplane, 1919.
- Lioré et Olivier LeO H-6: Four-passenger sesquiplane flying boat, 1919.
- Lioré et Olivier LeO 7: Bomber escort biplane, developed from the LeO 5, 1922.
  - Lioré et Olivier LeO 7/2: Production version for the French Air Force.
  - Lioré et Olivier LeO 7/3: Production version for the French Naval Aviation.
- Lioré et Olivier LeO 8: Two-seat reconnaissance aircraft and night fighter, 1923.
- Lioré et Olivier LeO 9: Single-seat, low-wing monoplane fighter, 1923.
- Liore et Olivier H.10: Prototype two-seat reconnaissance floatplane, 1923.
- Lioré et Olivier LeO 12: Night bomber prototype, 1924.
  - Lioré et Olivier LeO 121: One LeO 12 converted into a 12-seat airliner.
  - Lioré et Olivier LeO 122: Improved night bomber prototype, converted from an LeO 12.
  - Lioré et Olivier LeO 123: One LeO 12 converted into a testbed with enclosed cockpits.
- Lioré et Olivier LeO H-13: Biplane flying boat, 1922.
  - Lioré et Olivier H-132: Powered by two Hispano-Suiza 8Aa engines.
  - Lioré et Olivier H-133: Powered by two Renault 12F engines.
  - Lioré et Olivier H-134: Powered by one Lorraine 12Eb engine.
  - Lioré et Olivier H-135: Powered by two Hispano-Suiza 8Ab engines.
  - Lioré et Olivier H-136: Version for Aeronavale.
- Lioré et Olivier H-14: Proposed 5-seat version of the H-13.
- Lioré et Olivier LeO H-15: Twelve passenger flying boat, 1926.
- Liore et Olivier H-18: Two-seat flying boat, 1928.
  - Liore et Olivier H-181: Version of H.180 with an enclosed cockpit, longer span and lengthened fuselage.
  - Liore et Olivier H-182: Postal version.
- Lioré et Olivier LeO H-190: Flying boat airliner, 1928.
  - Lioré et Olivier LeO H-190T: Production version of the LeO H-190.
  - Lioré et Olivier LeO H-191: Trainer version, powered by a Lorraine 12Eb engine.
  - Lioré et Olivier LeO H-192: Similar to H-190T, but with pilot's position in the bow and powered by a Gnome-Rhone 9Ab engine.
  - Lioré et Olivier LeO H-193: Similar to H-192, but with a reinforced wing.
  - Lioré et Olivier LeO H-194: Version with increased fuel capacity for long-distance flights.
  - Lioré et Olivier LeO H-195: Military amphibian version (project).
  - Lioré et Olivier LeO H-196: Civil transport version, powered by a Gnome-Rhone 9Ab engine.
  - Lioré et Olivier LeO H-197S: Ambulance version.
  - Lioré et Olivier LeO H-198: Catapult-capable mailplane.
  - Lioré et Olivier LeO H-198/2: Catapult-capable airliner.
  - Lioré et Olivier LeO H-199/1: Twin-engine (push-pull) version, powered by two Hispano-Suiza 6Mbr engines.
  - Lioré et Olivier LeO H-199/2: As H-199/1 but powered by two Gnome-Rhone 7Kb engines.
- Lioré et Olivier LeO 20: Night bomber aircraft, developed from the LeO 122, 1927.
  - Lioré et Olivier LeO 201: Designation for parachute trainers converted from LeO 20.
  - Lioré et Olivier LeO 203: Four-engine version with Gnome-Rhone 7Kb engines.
  - Lioré et Olivier LeO H-20/4: Floatplane version of LeO 203. Also known as H-204.
  - Lioré et Olivier LeO 206: Production version of LeO 203 with revised nose, ventral "balcony" and a tail gun.
  - Lioré et Olivier LeO 207: Similar to LeO 206 but with a smaller "balcony" and revised nose.
  - Lioré et Olivier LeO 208: As LeO 20 but with an enclosed cockpit and Gnome-Rhone 14Mrs engines.
  - Lioré et Olivier LeO 208/2: LeO 208 development with relocated front gunner.
- Lioré et Olivier LeO 21: Biplane airliner/military transport based on the LeO 20, 1929.
  - Lioré et Olivier LeO 211: Modified first prototype of the LeO 21 to an avion-bar.
  - Lioré et Olivier LeO 212: Second prototype with two Renault 12Ja engines
  - Lioré et Olivier LeO 213: Production version.
  - Lioré et Olivier LeO 214: Designation for LeO 213s converted into military transports for the French Air Force.
  - Lioré et Olivier LeO 21S: Air ambulance based on the LeO 213.
- Lioré et Olivier LeO H-22: Flying boat mailplane, 1931.
  - Lioré et Olivier LeO H-221: Three-seat trainer flying boat.
  - Lioré et Olivier LeO H-222: Two-seat transport mailplane flying boat (project).
- Lioré et Olivier LeO H-23: Amphibious reconnaissance flying boat, 1930.
- Lioré et Olivier LeO H-23-2: Amphibious reconnaissance flying boat, 1932. Also known as H-232.
- Liore et Olivier H-24: Flying boat airliners.
  - Lioré et Olivier H-241: Initial variant of the H-24.
  - Lioré et Olivier H-242: Flying boat airliner, 1933.
  - Lioré et Olivier H-242/1: Revised version of H-242 with a modified engine installation.
  - Lioré et Olivier H-243: Unbuilt version for the French Navy with enlarged hull (project).
  - Lioré et Olivier H-244: High-speed intercontinental flying boat for Air Union (project). Abandoned when Air Union was absorbed into Air France.
  - Lioré et Olivier LeO H-246: Transport flying boat, 1939.
- Lioré et Olivier LeO 25: Bomber developed from the LeO 20, 1928.
  - Lioré et Olivier LeO 251: Lightweight version of LeO 25 (project).
  - Lioré et Olivier LeO 252: Landplane bomber converted from LeO 25.
  - Lioré et Olivier LeO 253: Landplane bomber similar to LeO 252.
  - Lioré et Olivier LeO H-254: Seaplane version of LeO 252.
  - Lioré et Olivier LeO H-255: Record-setting version of H-254.
  - Lioré et Olivier LeO H-256: As H-254 except with lengthened wingspan.
  - Lioré et Olivier LeO H-257: Modified H-254 for Aeronavale.
    - Lioré et Olivier LeO H-257bis: Production version of H-257.
  - Lioré et Olivier LeO H-258: Interim version similar to H-257bis for Aeronavale while H-257bis production was being undertaken.
  - Lioré et Olivier LeO 259: Version powered by Hispano-Suiza 12Y engines.
- Liore et Olivier H-27: Flying boat mailplane, 1933.
  - Lioré et Olivier LeO H-271: Military derivative of H-27 (project).
- Lioré et Olivier LeO H-28: Seaplane project.
- Lioré et Olivier LeO 40: Experimental biplane, 1932.
- Lioré et Olivier LeO 41: Experimental biplane, 1932.
- Lioré et Olivier LeO H-42: Maritime patrol sesquiplane flying boat, 1932 (project).
- Lioré et Olivier LeO H-43: Ship-based reconnaissance seaplane, 1934.
  - Lioré et Olivier LeO H-43S: Developed version with larger rudder.
  - Lioré et Olivier LeO H-431: Version with Gnome-Rhone K9 engine.
- Lioré et Olivier LeO 45: Designation for the LeO 451 prototype.
  - Lioré et Olivier LeO 451: Production version of the LeO 45.
- Lioré et Olivier LeO H-47: Flying boat airliner/maritime patrol aircraft, 1936.
  - Liore et Olivier H-470: Improved version of H.47.
- Lioré et Olivier LeO 48: Experimental four-seat, mid-wing aircraft, 1941.
- Lioré et Olivier LeO H-49: Large transatlantic flying boat airliner, 1942. Produced as the SNCASE SE.200.
- Lioré et Olivier LeO 50: Two-seat heavy fighter. Produced as the SNCASE SE.100.
- Lioré et Olivier LeO 300: Prototype night bomber, 1933.
  - Lioré et Olivier 301: Version with more powerful engines.
- Lioré et Olivier LeO H-440: High-wing, long-range maritime monoplane flying boat, 1935 (project).
  - Lioré et Olivier H-440/1: Civilian version.
