= Lioré et Olivier LeO 41 =

LeO 41

General information
- Type: Experimental biplane
- National origin: France
- Manufacturer: Lioré et Olivier
- Number built: 1

History
- First flight: 1932

The Lioré et Olivier LeO 41 was a French experimental biplane built by Lioré et Olivier. The LeO 41 has been described as a "strange design" with long control surfaces fitted to struts behind each wing, it was powered by a 95 hp (71 kW) Renault 4Pb engine. Only one was built and the design was abandoned.

== Specifications ==
General characteristics

- Capacity: 2
