= Lioré et Olivier LeO 7 =

Lioré et Olivier 7
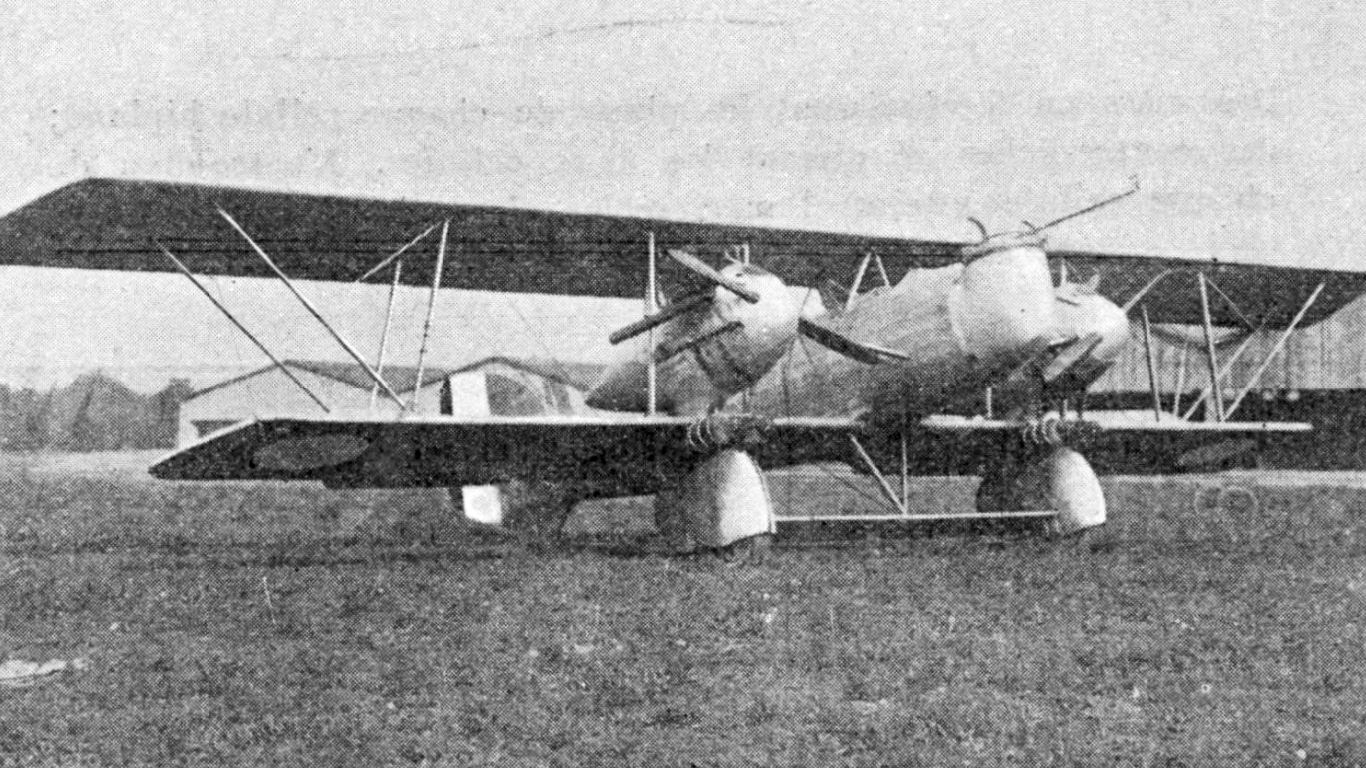

General information
- Type: Bomber escort biplane
- Manufacturer: Lioré et Olivier
- Primary users: French Air Force French Navy
- Number built: 39

History
- First flight: 1922

The Lioré et Olivier LeO 7 was a French bomber escort biplane designed and built by Lioré et Olivier for the French Air Force.

== Design and development ==
The LeO 7 was three-seat bomber escort biplane developed from the LeO 5 ground-attack biplane. Appearing in 1922 the production version (the LeO 7/2) had a wide-track landing gear and gunner's cockpits in the snub nose and amidships. The pilot was located in a cockpit just behind the wing trailing edge.

== Operational history ==
Twenty LeO 7/2s were built followed by 18 LeO 7/3s which were a navalised version with increased wingspan.

== Variants ==
LeO 7
Prototype
LeO 7/2
Production version for the Armée de l'Air (French Air Force), 20 built
LeO 7/3
Production version for the Aéronautique Navale (French Naval Aviation), 18 built.

== Operators ==
France

- French Air Force
- French Navy

== Specifications (LeO 7/2) ==
Data from The Illustrated Encyclopedia of Aircraft

General characteristics

- Crew: 3 (pilot and two gunners)
- Length: 11 m (38 ft 0.75 in)
- Wingspan: 18.59 m (60 ft 11.75 in)
- Height: 3.9 m (13 ft 2.25 in)
- Wing area: 68 m^{2} (730 sq ft)
- Powerplant: 2 × Hispano-Suiza 8Fb V-8 engines , 223 kW (300 hp) each

Performance

- Maximum speed: 190 km/h (118 mph, 103 kn)
- Service ceiling: 7,010 m (23,000 ft)

Armament

- 400kg (882lb) bombs
