= Lioré et Olivier LeO H-13 =

Lioré et Olivier H-13
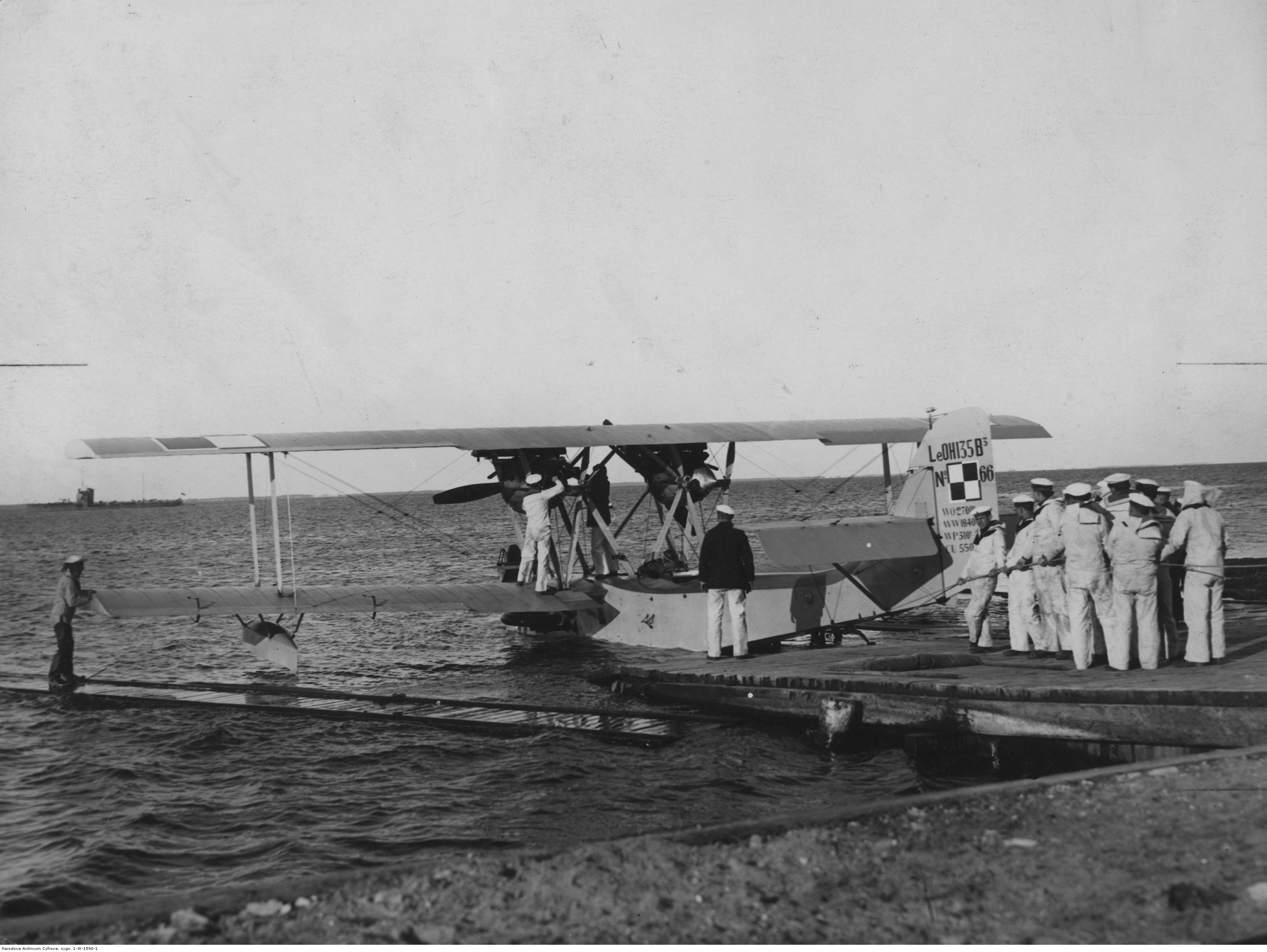
- LeO H.135B3 no. 6-6 of Polish Navy

General information
- Type: Passenger and bomber flying boat
- Manufacturer: Lioré et Olivier
- Primary users: French Navy French civil aviation Polish Navy
- Number built: 53

History
- First flight: July 1922

The Lioré et Olivier LéO H-13 was a French biplane two-engine flying boat of the 1920s, built in passenger and military variants.

== Development ==
The LeO H-13 was constructed by Lioré et Olivier in Levallois-Perret factory, for an order of the French Aeronavale airlines. The prototype was flown in July 1922. From 1923 23 passenger aircraft were built LeO H-13A.

Next, military variants were developed: reconnaissance-bomber LeO H-13B-3 and trainer LeO H-13E. They differed in fuselage configuration, because the H-13B-3 had an open cockpit for a pilot only behind a lower wing, while the H-13E had an open cockpit for a trainee and instructor seating side-by-side, in front of wings. Both had open machine gun positions in the nose and behind the wings. The H-13E could be also used as a reconnaissance aircraft. From late 1923 20 H-13B-3 were built (nos. 1-20) and 10 H-13E (nos. 21-30).

== Variants ==
Data from: - Lioré et Olivier

LéO H-13

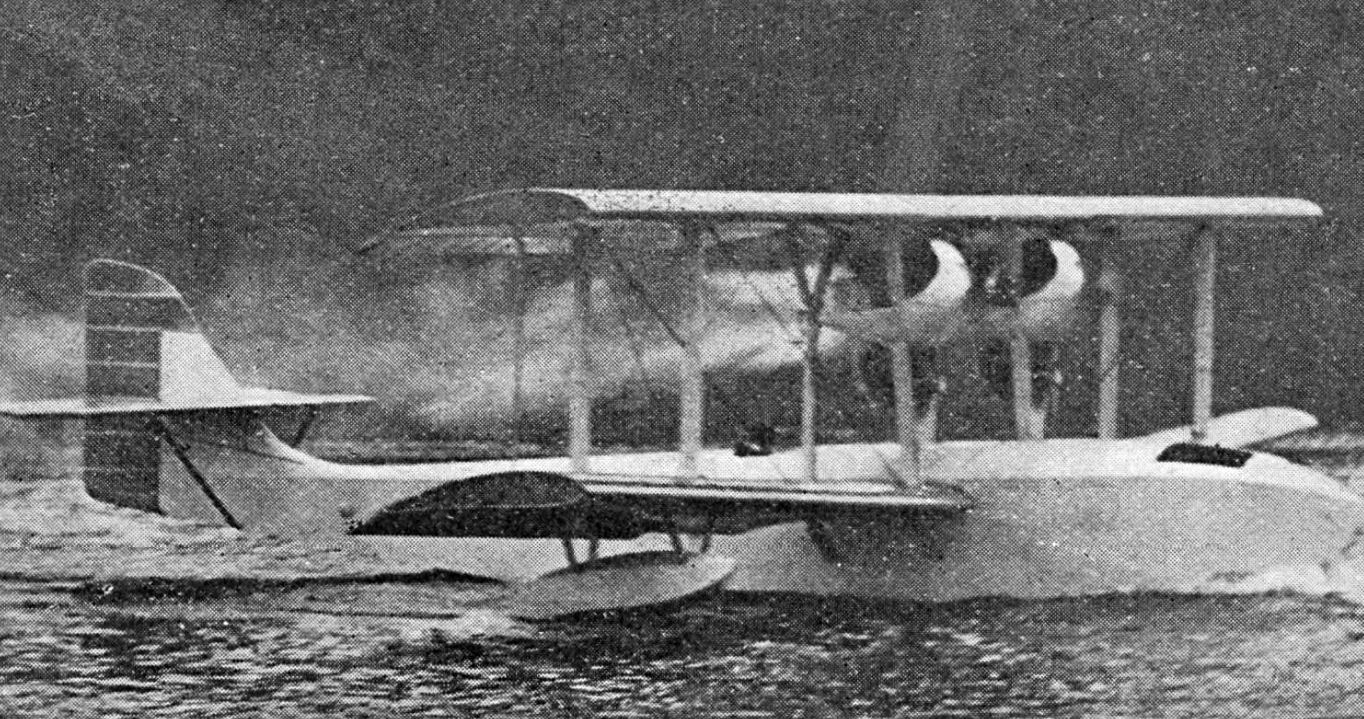
Lioré et Olivier LeO H-13 photo from L'Aéronautique December,1922

Prototype
LeO H-13bis
LéO H-13A
Passenger variant, 3 built
LéO H-13B-3
Reconnaissance-bomber variant, 20 built.
LéO H-13E
Trainer variant, 10 built.
LeO H-132
2 built, powered by 2x Hispano-Suiza 8Aa engines.
LeO H-133
4 built, powered by 2x 300 hp (223.7 kW) Renault 12F engines.
LeO H-134

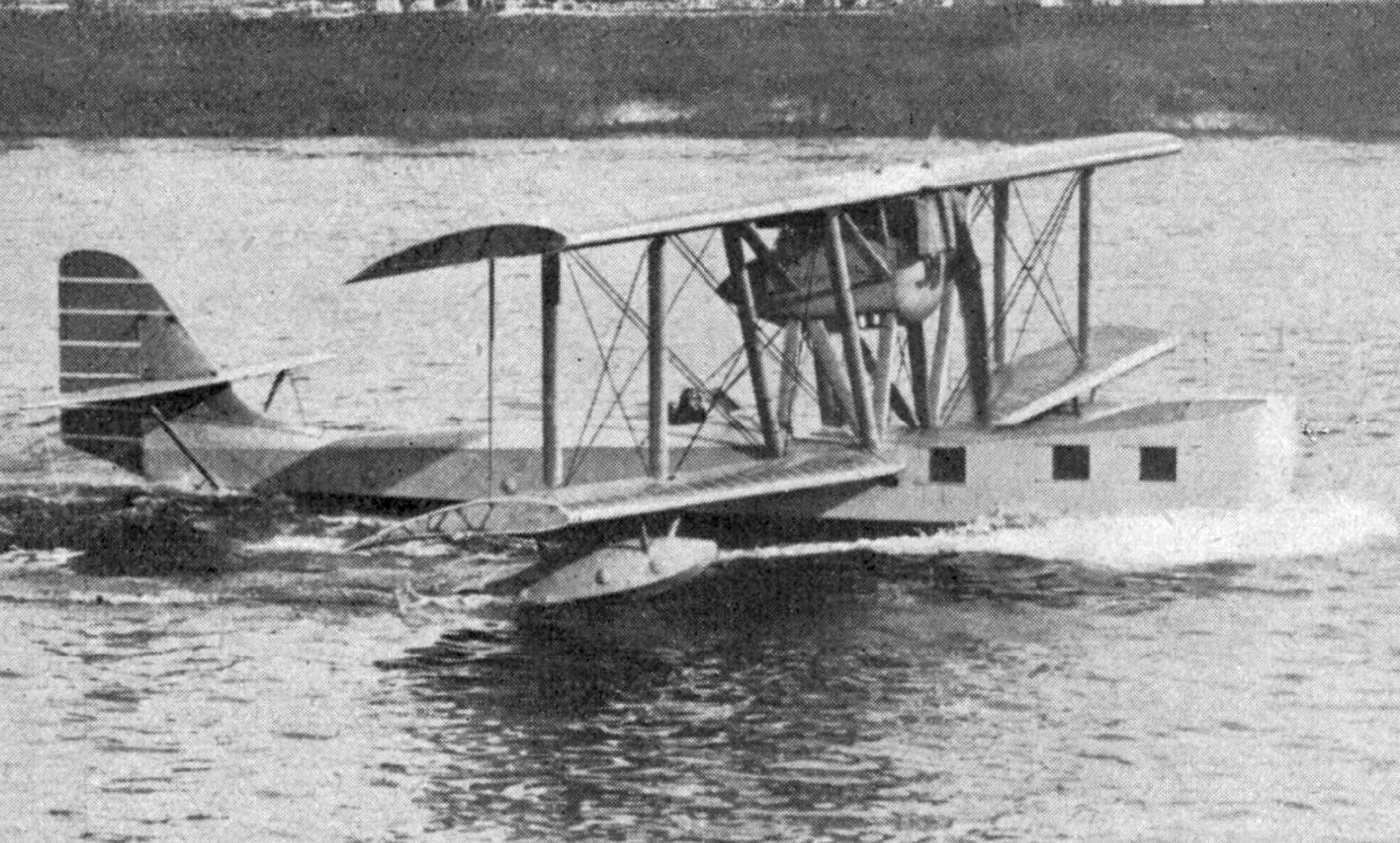
Lioré et Olivier LeO H-134 photo from L'Aéronautique January,1926

2 built, powered by 1x 450 hp (335.6 kW) Lorraine 12Eb engines.
LeO H-135
7 built, powered by 2x 180 hp (134.2 kW) Hispano-Suiza 8Ab engines.
LeO H-136
12 built for Aeronavale
Leo H-14
Design studies for a 5-seat version of the H-13, not completed due to lack of interest from airlines.

== Service ==
Passenger H-13A were used over the Mediterranean Sea.

In the French Navy, H-13 were quickly withdrawn for training purpose, because of weak structure and low manufacturing quality.

In 1924-1925 two H-13B3 and two H-13E were sold to Poland and used in Naval Aviation Unit (MDLot) in Puck from mid-1925. One of H-13E was used for a short time in a River Flotilla in Pińsk. The first H-13B-3 no. 1-1 was withdrawn in 1929, next two (nos. 1-2 and 1-3) in 1931, while the last H-13E, no. 1-4, crashed on 29 July 1931 over the land near Puck.

== Description ==
Two-engine biplane flying boat of wooden construction. Wooden framed fuselage, plywood covered, rectangular in cross-section, with a flat bottom with a single step. Two-spar rectangular wings, covered with plywood (in front) and canvas. A lower wing attached to the fuselage, an upper wing above it, mounted on struts, with two engines between wings, driving tractor propellers. Two floats under a lower wing. Conventional braced empennage. Two 150 hp radial engines Hispano-Suiza 8E.

Armament: two twin 7.7 mm Lewis machine guns and 4 bombs up to 25 kg below a lower wing.

== Operators ==
France

- French Navy

Poland

- Polish Navy

== Specifications (LeO H-13B-3) ==
Data from Lioré et Olivier

General characteristics

- Length: 11 m (36 ft 1 in)
- Wingspan: 16 m (52 ft 6 in)
- Height: 3.7 m (12 ft 2 in)
- Wing area: 58 m^{2} (620 sq ft)
- Empty weight: 1,620 kg (3,571 lb)
- Gross weight: 2,500 kg (5,512 lb)
- Fuel capacity: 250 kg (551.2 lb) (350 L (77.0 imp gal))
- Powerplant: 2 × Hispano-Suiza 8Aa V-8 water-cooled piston engine, 110 kW (150 hp) each

Performance

- Maximum speed: 170 km/h (110 mph, 92 kn) military aircraft, 160 km/h (99.4 mph; 86.4 kn)
- Range: 450 km (280 mi, 240 nmi)
- Service ceiling: 3,600 m (11,800 ft)
- Rate of climb: 3.1 m/s (610 ft/min)
- Wing loading: 38.8 kg/m^{2} (7.9 lb/sq ft)

== Bibliography ==
- Hartmann, Gerard (2002). Lioré et Olivier. Boulogne-Billancourt: E-T-A-I. ISBN 2-7268-8607-8.
- Nelcarz, Bartolomiej & Peczkowski, Robert (2001). White Eagles: The Aircraft, Men and Operations of the Polish Air Force 1918–1939. Ottringham, UK: Hikoki Publications. ISBN 1-902109-73-2.
- Sankowski, Wojciech: "Pierwsze Francuzy" in: Lotnictwo z szachownicą nr 20 (in Polish)
