= Lioré et Olivier LeO 40 =

French experimental two-seat biplane

LeO 40

General information
- Type: Experimental biplane
- National origin: France
- Manufacturer: Lioré et Olivier
- Number built: 1

History
- First flight: 1932

The Lioré et Olivier LeO 40 was a French experimental biplane built by Lioré et Olivier. The two-seat LeO 40 had full span slats fitted to both wings, it was powered by a 95 hp (71 kW) Argus engine in Pusher configuration. Only one was built and the design was abandoned.

== Specifications ==
General characteristics

- Capacity: 2
