= Lioré et Olivier LeO 12 =

LeO 12
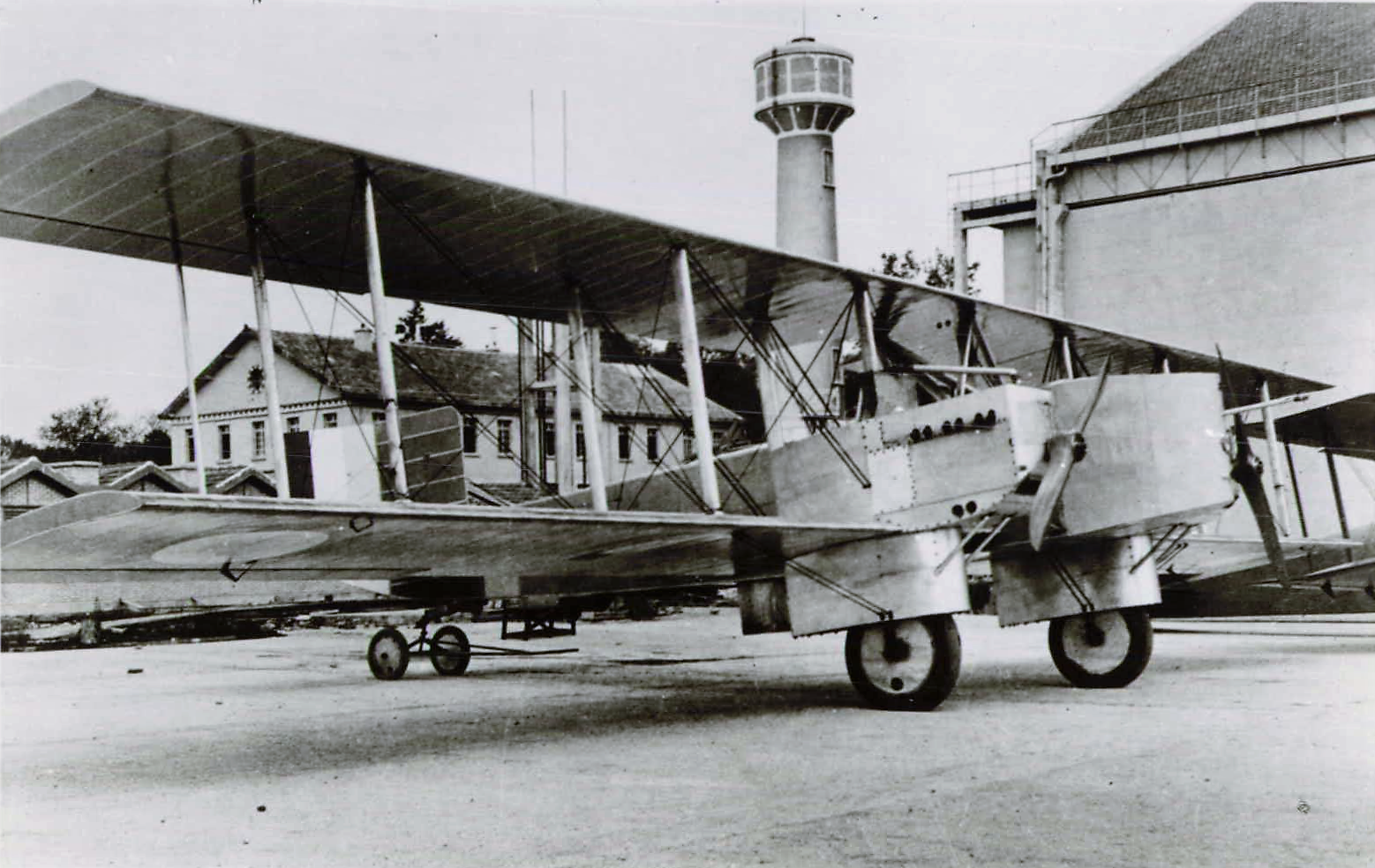

General information
- Type: Night bomber
- National origin: France
- Manufacturer: Lioré et Olivier
- Number built: 4

History
- First flight: June 1924

The Lioré et Olivier LeO 12 was a large biplane designed and produced by the French aircraft manufacturer Lioré et Olivier. Designed for use as a night bomber, it was adapted to other roles, including that of a civilian airliner, following a lack of interest from the French Air Force.

The LeO 12 was a large biplane of a conventional design, with three-bay equal-span wings and twin engines mounted in nacelles on struts in the interplane gap. The independent main undercarriage units were faired in long, trouser-style spats. Construction throughout was mainly duralumin, skinned in fabric. The pilot's cockpit was open, and there was a second cockpit amidships for a gunner.

== Design and development ==
The Lioré et Olivier LeO 12 was a large biplane that was broadly conventional in terms of its design, which was relatively simplistic and, aside from its covering, was made entirely of metal. Considerable attention was paid to minimising construction costs, a factor which drove simplicity as well as a minimal use of stamped components as well as riveting. It had a framework that primarily comprised light-metal tubing that was standardised wherever feasible to do so. During its official trials, the LeO 12 demonstrated favourable performance, particularly in terms of its flying characteristics, proving to be both easily manageable and manoeuvrable even when carrying its full payload and with one engine out while flying at an altitude of 2000m (6562 ft.).

While principally intended for use by military operators in the night bomber role, for which it was to have been crewed by either two or three personnel, it was also readily convertible into a commercial airliner configuration, capable of carrying a maximum of 15 passengers along with up to 300 kg (661 lb.) of freight. In a bomber configuration, the aircraft's fuselage had a width of 1.3 m (4. • 27 ft.) and a height of 1.5 in (4.92 ft.) at its largest point. The cockpit, which was positioned directly behind the cell, contained two seats in a side by side configuration. In the vicinity of the cockpit, cutaways are present in the wings in order to increase external visibility for the crew. Directly behind the cockpit was a turret armed with twin machine guns while a second gunner's position was present within the fuselage, thus permitting both forward and aft defensive fire as required.

It was typically powered by a pair of Lorraine-Dietrich 12Db engines, each capable of generating up to 400 HP, which enabled the aircraft to attain its maximum speed of 204 kmph (127 mph) while baring a payload of 1,944 kg (4,286 lb.) and achieving a combat range of 875 km (544 miles). Each engine was mounted on a removable frame forward of the lower wing. A pair of compression struts of light-metal tubing connected the cross members of the engine bed with the struts of the landing gear. An assortment of standardised struts, cross members and diagonals connected the two cross members to the compression struts of the engine frame. Attachments were provided on each engine to facilitate its removal, thus permitting an engine replacement to be accomplished within the space of three hours. The engines were also relatively accessible for inspection and servicing purposes, being located entirely outside of the cell and fitted with removal hoods. A frontal honeycomb-style radiator was positioned located above and to the rear of each engine; these radiators could be moved vertically and thus drawn into the cockpit behind the engine. Additional cooling was provided by a side-mounted water tank.

The landing gear consisted of two entirely independent elements that comprised a fixed frame and a movable frame of steel tubes, the latter being guided by the former. Each part of the landing gear was located directly underneath one of the engines and enclosed in a housing. Shock absorption measures were also incorporated into the upper frames. The landing gear was considered to be relatively strong, being capable of supporting up to six times the total weight of the aircraft without sustaining damage. Large diameter wheels were used, which permitted the aircraft to traverse rough terrain more easily as well as to prevent the wheels from sinking into soft ground.

The LeO 12 had two equal unstaggered rectangular wing, lacking any lateral dihedral or longitudinal sweep back. It was divided into half-cells, each one possessing three pairs of vertical struts that were diagonally braced using steel cables; the upper wing connected with the fuselage at the centre of the cell via a series of oblique struts. The structure of the wing was entirely composed of metal; each wing possessed a pair of box girders and numerous strengthening ribs that formed a braced girder. The exterior was covered by fabric. A total of four unbalanced ailerons were present.

The framework of the empennage was mainly composed of light metal, although some steel elements were present. A fabric covering was used. A series of double-steel turnbuckles, each one attached to the base of the rearmost upright of the fuselage as well as to the spar of the plane, were used to secure parts of the tail unit; the lower end was integral with the rudder post and braced by two compact oblique struts. The horizontal elements of the empennage were relatively simplistic, comprising a stabilizer and an unbalanced two-part elevator. The incidence of the stabilizer could be adjusted mid-flight, an ability which, when appropriately set by the pilot, meant that no force would need to be exerted on the control stick. The vertical empennage consisted of a large fin and an unbalanced rudder. A patented device was present for adjusting the fin; a function that was deemed to be retaining ideal control of the rudder and was particularly useful in extending flight time by appropriately adjusting the fin to compensate for the case of the stopping of one of the engines.

== Operational history ==
After the French Air Force failed to quickly solidify their interest in the type as a bomber, three of the four aircraft built were modified for other roles. One was adapted into a 12-seat passenger transport that Lioré et Olivier operated under an airline subsidiary. Another had its cockpit and gunner's hatch enclosed and was used by the French air ministry as an experimental testbed while the third received new engines and better defensive armament and was again demonstrated to the French military. The reception to this type, the LeO 122, was barely more enthusiastic; however, Lioré et Olivier used it as the basis for further development work that would result in the successful LeO 20.

== Variants ==
- LeO 12 - prototype night bomber version with Lorraine-Dietrich 12Db engines (four built)
  - LeO 12 BN.2
  - LeO 12 BN.3
- LeO 121 - 12-seat airliner (one converted from LeO 12)
- LeO 122 - improved night bomber prototype with Gnome-Rhône 9Ab engines and extended "balcony" on nose for second gunner (one converted from LeO 12)
- LeO 123 - testbed with enclosed cockpits (one converted from LeO 12)

== Specifications (LeO 12) ==
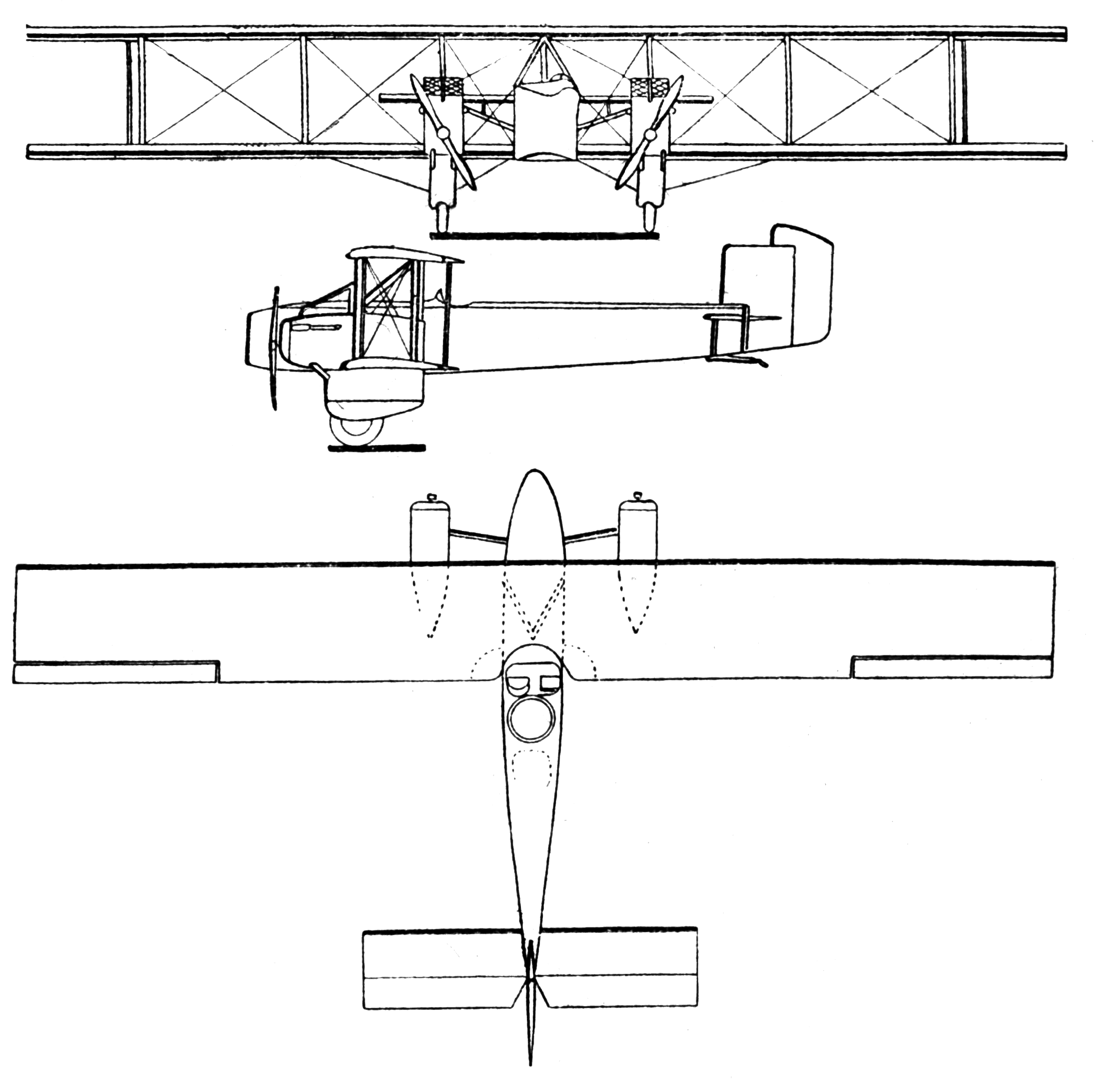
Liore et Olivier LeO 12 3-view drawing from Les Ailes January 21, 1926

Data from National Advisory Committee for Aeronautics

General characteristics

- Crew: Two (pilot and gunner)
- Length: 12.6 m (41 ft 4 in)
- Wingspan: 22.2 m (72 ft 10 in)
- Height: 4.26 m (14 ft 0 in)
- Wing area: 105 m^{2} (1,130.21 sq ft)
- Empty weight: 2,650 kg (5,842 lb)
- Gross weight: 4,600 kg (10,141 lb)
- Powerplant: 2 × Lorraine-Dietrich 12Db , 300 kW (400 hp) each

Performance

- Maximum speed: 204 km/h (126.75 mph, 110.14 kn)
- Range: 598.6 km (372 mi, 323 nmi)
- Service ceiling: 6,004 m (19,700 ft)
