= Lioré et Olivier 300 =

LeO 300
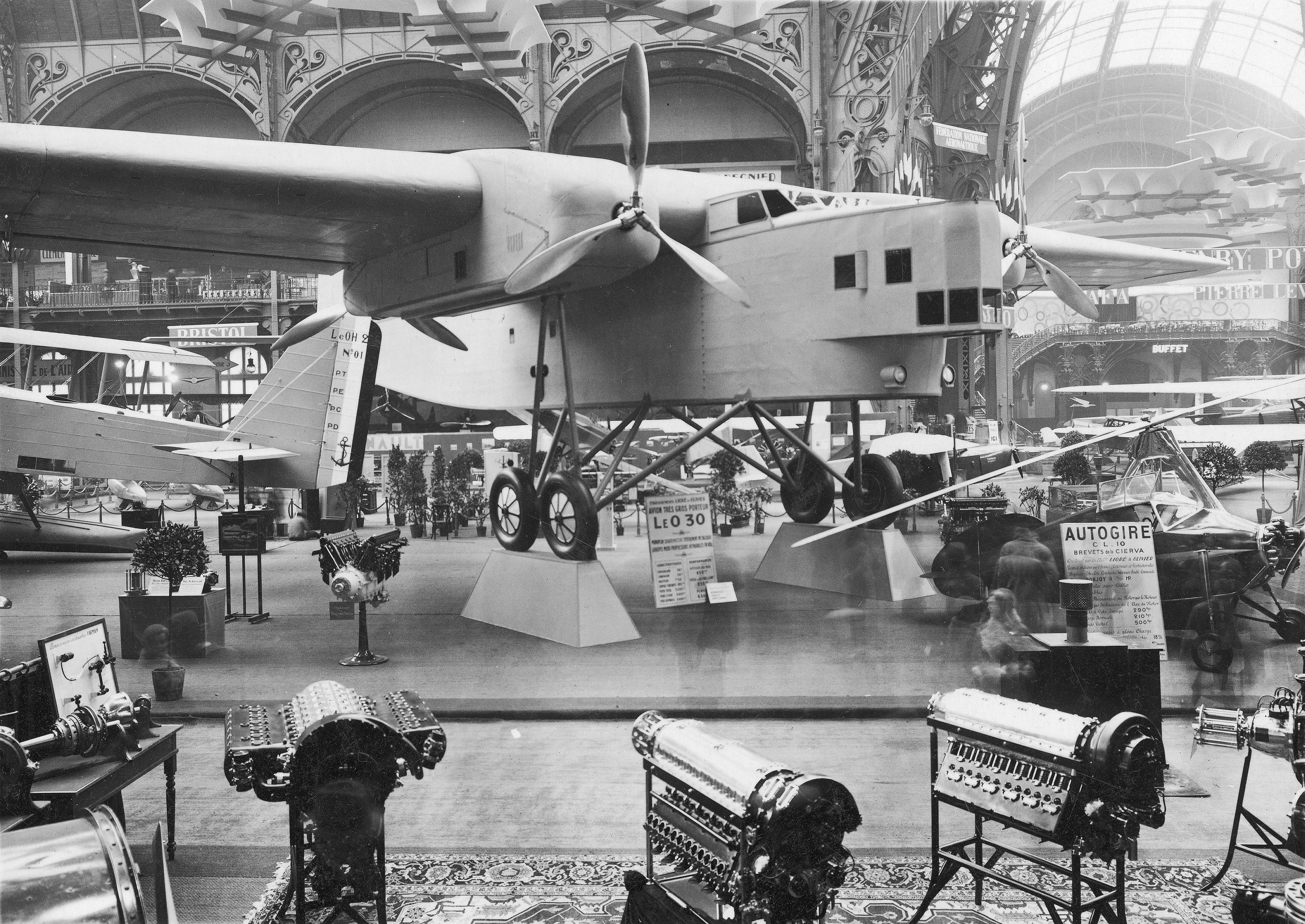

General information
- Type: Night bomber
- National origin: France
- Manufacturer: Lioré et Olivier
- Status: retired
- Number built: 1

History
- First flight: 1933

The Lioré et Olivier 300 (abbreviated to LeO 300) was a 1930s French prototype night bomber. Only one was built when the programme was abandoned.

== Design and development ==
The LeO 300 was designed to meet a French requirement for a BN.5 category night bomber. It was a high-wing cantilever monoplane with a crew of five. The prototype first flew in September 1933, powered by four 500 hp (373 kW) Renault 12Jb engines mounted in tandem pairs on the wings. The LeO 300 was superseded by the LeO 301 with more powerful engines but with the withdrawal of the requirement it was abandoned in final assembly and work on the programme was stopped.

== Variants ==
LeO 300
Prototype four-engine night bomber, one built.
Leo 301
Improved variant with more powerful engines, not completed.

== Specifications ==
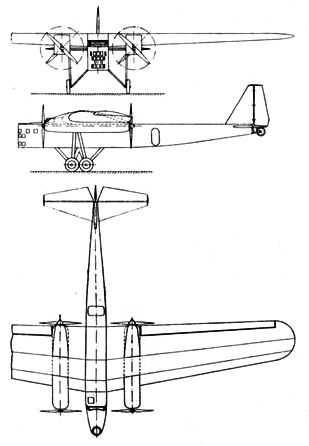
Lioré et Olivier LeO 30 3-view drawing from L'Aerophile Salon 1932

Data from

General characteristics

- Crew: 5
- Length: 23.98 m (78 ft 8 in)
- Wingspan: 38 m (124 ft 8 in)
- Height: 6 m (19 ft 8 in)
- Wing area: 185 m^{2} (1,990 sq ft)
- Empty weight: 7,600 kg (16,755 lb)
- Gross weight: 14,800 kg (32,628 lb)
- Powerplant: 4 × Renault 12Jb V-12 water-cooled piston engines, 370 kW (500 hp) each

Performance

- Maximum speed: 210 km/h (130 mph, 110 kn)
- Service ceiling: 5,000 m (16,000 ft)

== Bibliography ==
- Hartmann, Gérard. Les Avions Lioré et Olivier. Boulogne-Billancourt, France: ETAI. 2002. ISBN 2-7268-8607-8 (in French)
- The Illustrated Encyclopedia of Aircraft (Part Work 1982-1985). Orbis Publishing.
