= Lioré et Olivier LeO 5 =

LeO 5

General information
- Type: Ground attack
- Manufacturer: Lioré et Olivier
- Number built: 1

History
- First flight: 1919

The Lioré-et-Olivier LeO 5 was a French ground attack biplane, built shortly after World War I, initially to the S2 armoured attack aircraft specification and then to the Ab2 specification, from the STAé (Service Technique de l'Aéronautique).

== Specifications (Leo 5) ==
Data from Aviafrance : Lioré et Olivier LeO-5

General characteristics

- Crew: 2
- Length: 8.3 m (27 ft 3 in)
- Wingspan: 14.35 m (47 ft 1 in)
- Height: 3.34 m (10 ft 11 in)
- Gross weight: 1,900 kg (4,189 lb)
- Fuel capacity: 3,235 L (855 US gal; 712 imp gal)
- Powerplant: 2 × Le Rhône Type 9R 9-cylinder air-cooled rotary piston engines, 130 kW (170 hp) each

Performance

- Maximum speed: 190 km/h (120 mph, 100 kn)
