= Lioré et Olivier LeO H-6 =

LeO H-6
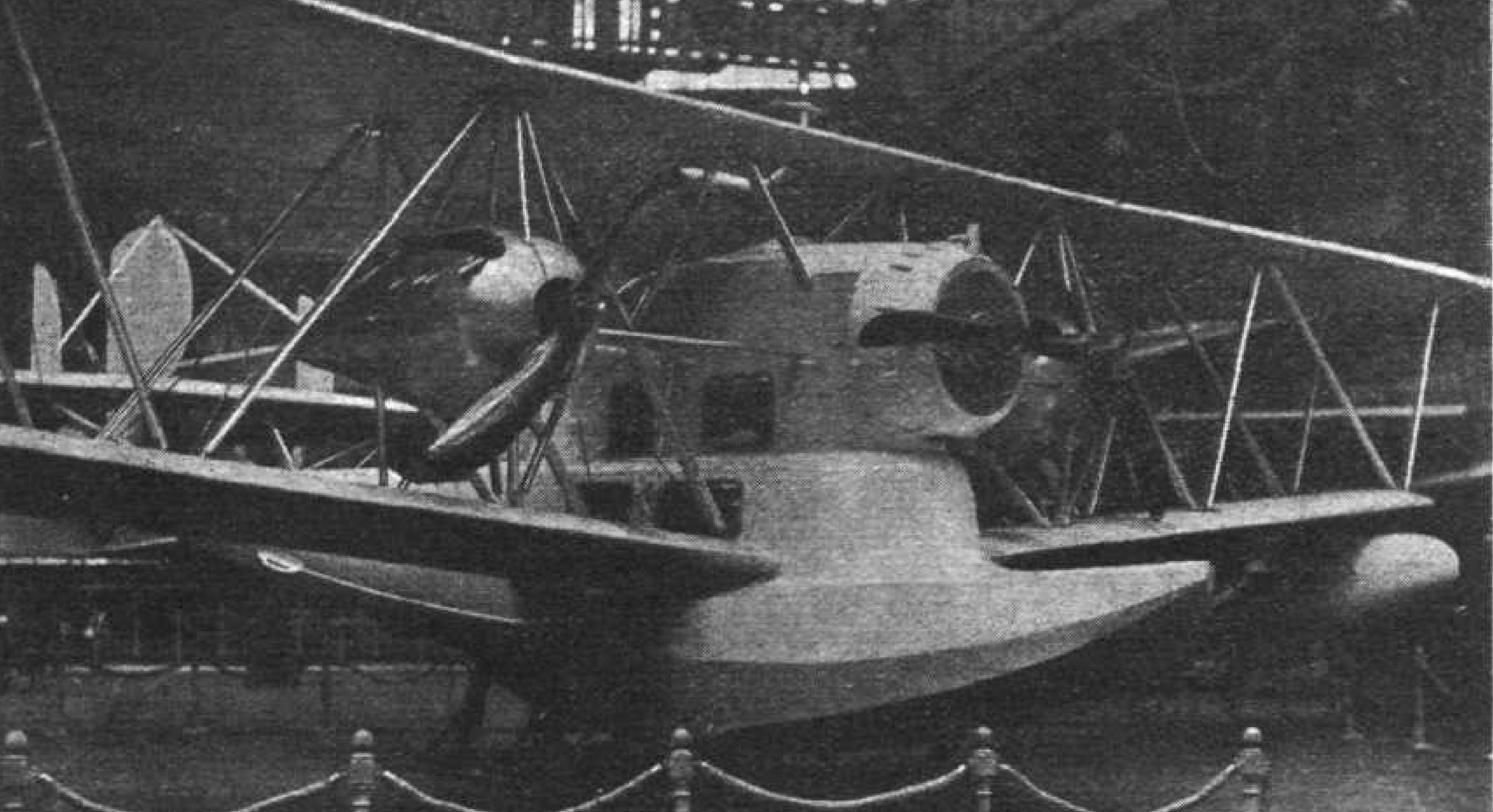

General information
- Type: Flying boat
- National origin: France
- Manufacturer: Lioré-et-Olivier
- Number built: 2

History
- First flight: 1919

The Lioré-et-Olivier LeO H-6 and LeO H-6/2 were French flying boat and amphibian aircraft, built shortly after World War I.

== Design ==
The LeO H-6 was a biplane flying boat with a monocoque fuselage. The second example, the LeO H-6/2, with similar powerplant, was completed as an amphibian.

== Variants ==
LeO H-6
the first aircraft a flying boat transport.
LeO H-6/2
The generally similar amphibious version.

== Specifications (LeO H-6) ==
Data from Aviafrance : Lioré et Olivier LeO H-6, Aviafrance : Lioré et Olivier LeO H-6/2

General characteristics

- Crew: 6
- Length: 14.92 m (48 ft 11 in)

LeO H-6/2: 14.96 m (49.1 ft)

- Wingspan: 23.12 m (75 ft 10 in)
- Height: 4.45 m (14 ft 7 in)

LeO H-6/2: 4.88 m (16.0 ft)

- Wing area: 107 m^{2} (1,150 sq ft)
- Empty weight: 2,650 kg (5,842 lb)

LeO H-6/2: 2,790 kg (6,150 lb)

- Gross weight: 4,000 kg (8,818 lb)

LeO H-6/2: 4,350 kg (9,590 lb)

- Powerplant: 2 × Hispano-Suiza 8Aa V-8 water-cooled piston engines, 110 kW (150 hp) each
- Powerplant: 1 × Salmson CM9 9-cylinder water-cooled radial piston engine, 190 kW (260 hp)

Performance

- Maximum speed: 160 km/h (99 mph, 86 kn)

LeO H-6/2: 150 km/h (93 mph; 81 kn)
