= Lioré et Olivier LeO H-27 =

LeO H-27
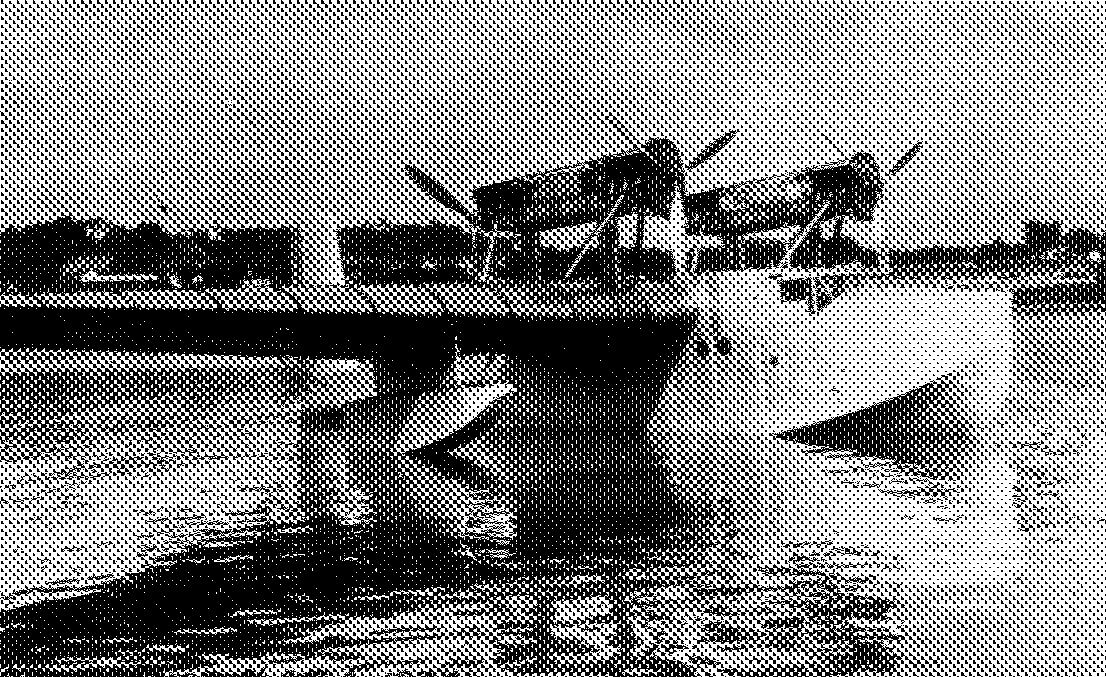

General information
- Type: Postal flying boat
- National origin: France
- Manufacturer: Lioré et Olivier

History
- First flight: 30 December 1933

The four-engined Lioré et Olivier LeO H-27 was one of three French flying boats competing to carry mail over Air France's South Atlantic routes. Flying later than its competitors, it was not selected and only one was built.

== Design ==
The LeO H-27 was built in response to a French government call for a postal aircraft able to cover the South Atlantic routes. It was in competition with the Latécoère 300 and the Blériot 5190.

The design of the LeO H-27 was assisted by Lioré at Olivier's experience with the LeO H-180 and LeO H-240 flying boats, the first single-engined and the second with one push-pull pair. It was a high wing cantilever monoplane with an all-metal wing in two parts, each with a thick airfoil, rectangular plan centre section and a trapezoidal outer panel with a rounded tip. The outer panel tapered in thickness outwards and carried 11.80 m (38.7 ft) span ailerons which, like the rear control surfaces, were balanced. The wing was built around two duralumin spars joined into a central box to which the leading and trailing edges were attached; all were dural covered.

Four 480 kW (650 hp) Hispano-Suiza 12Nbr water-cooled V-12 engines, each driving a three blade propeller, were mounted in two push-pull pairs, each pair mounted above the central panel on N-form, broad, faired struts assisted by two forward diagonal thrust struts and a near vertical pair aft.

The LeO H-27 had a two step hull; its concave V reinforced underside had a central angle of 144°. It was a flat sided structure built around longerons and frames. There was a mooring compartment in the extreme nose and in a second section the pilots' multiply-windowed cabin was also well forward and in front of the propeller discs. It had side-by-side seats with dual controls and was high up, with a navigator's cabin and radio equipment underneath, lit by portholes just forward of the port side crew entry door. The engineer's compartment was immediately behind the pilots. The mail was stored in a third, 8 m^{3} (280 cu ft), section of the hull and the fourth housed equipment and four hammocks.

At the rear a tall, straight edged fin mounted a narrow rectangular balanced rudder and also the high aspect ratio, parallel chord tailplane, positioned about halfway up the fin to keep it out of the spray and braced with a single strut on each side to the top of the hull. It had separate, narrow chord elevators.

Lateral stability on the water was provided by two wing-mounted floats, with single step, V-form undersides. These were mounted below the central-outer wing panel junctions at only about one-quarter span on a combination of faired-in vertical and inward leaning struts.

== Development ==
Though the hull of the LeO H-27 was first seen in public at the 12th Paris Aéro Salon in November 1930, it did not fly until 30 December 1933, piloted by Bourdin. Only one was built and Air France's South Atlantic routes were flown instead by the Latécoère 300; the LeO H-27 did make at least one Atlantic crossing when Bourdin flew it to the Antilles towards the end of 1934.

== Specifications ==
Data from Les Ailes February 1934

General characteristics

- Crew: Four
- Length: 21.45 m (70 ft 4 in)
- Wingspan: 36.80 m (120 ft 9 in)
- Height: 7.13 m (23 ft 5 in)
- Wing area: 180 m^{2} (1,900 sq ft)
- Empty weight: 9,330 kg (20,569 lb)
- Gross weight: 18,200 kg (40,124 lb)
- Fuel capacity: 9,460 L (2,080 imp gal; 2,500 US gal)
- Powerplant: 4 × Hispano-Suiza 12Nbr water-cooled geared V-12, 480 kW (650 hp) each
- Propellers: 3-bladed metal

Performance

- Maximum speed: 245 km/h (152 mph, 132 kn) at 1,500 m (4,900 ft)
- Range: 3,500 km (2,200 mi, 1,900 nmi) with 600 kg (1,300 lb) of mail and a 50 km/h (31 mph) head wind
- Service ceiling: 4,300 m (14,100 ft) theoretical
- Time to altitude: 15 min 30 sec to 2,000 m (6,600 ft)

== Bibliography ==
- Hartmann, Gérard. Les Avions Lioré Et Olivier. Boulogne-Billancourt, France: ETAI. 2002. ISBN 2-7268-8607-8 (in French)
