= Lioré et Olivier LeO H-43 =

LeO H-43
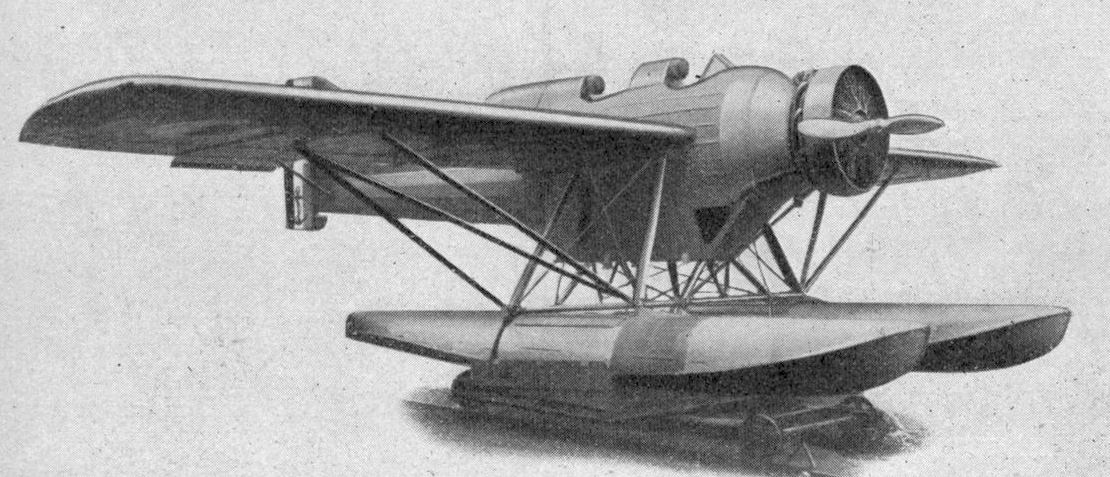

General information
- Type: Reconnaissance seaplane
- National origin: France
- Manufacturer: Lioré et Olivier
- Primary user: Aéronavale
- Number built: 21

History
- Introduction date: 13 July 1939
- First flight: 4 December 1934

The Lioré et Olivier LeO H-43 was a reconnaissance seaplane produced in France in the 1930s. It was a strut-braced, mid-wing monoplane of largely conventional design, provided with an observation balcony underneath the fuselage. It was designed to be launched by catapult from warships and, after a first flight in 1934, trials were conducted on board Commandant Teste.

Development was prolonged and the prototype underwent much modification before an order for 20 machines was placed by the Aéronavale. Even after this, a major redesign to the forward fuselage was specified as part of the production order. As a result, the first test flight of the production version did not take place until 13 July 1939, by which time the H-43 was already obsolete.

The twenty examples purchased briefly equipped two squadrons from February 1940, but all were withdrawn with the Fall of France.

== Operators ==
France

- Aéronavale
  - Escadrille 3S1
  - Escadrille 3S5

== Specifications ==
General characteristics

- Crew: Three
- Length: 11.00 m (36 ft 1 in)
- Wingspan: 16.00 m (52 ft 6 in)
- Height: 3.85 m (12 ft 8 in)
- Wing area: 36.0 m^{2} (387 sq ft)
- Empty weight: 1,760 kg (3,870 lb)
- Gross weight: 3,375 kg (7,425 lb)
- Powerplant: 1 × Hispano-Suiza 9Vb , 480 kW (650 hp)

Performance

- Maximum speed: 222 km/h (139 mph, 121 kn)
- Range: 850 km (530 mi, 460 nmi)
- Service ceiling: 6,200 m (20,300 ft)

Armament

- 2 × machine guns

== See also ==
Related lists

- List of aircraft of World War II
- List of flying boats and floatplanes
