= Lioré et Olivier LeO 48 =

LeO 48

General information
- Type: Experimental
- National origin: Vichy France
- Manufacturer: Liore et Olivier
- Number built: 1

History
- First flight: 21 November 1941

The Lioré-et-Olivier LeO 48 was a French experimental aircraft that was built early in World War II.

== Specifications (LeO 48) ==
Data from

General characteristics

- Crew: 4
- Length: 8.77 m (28 ft 9 in)
- Wingspan: 11.3 m (37 ft 1 in)
- Height: 5.77 m (18 ft 11 in)
- Wing area: 17 m^{2} (180 sq ft)
- Empty weight: 1,600 kg (3,527 lb)
- Gross weight: 2,100 kg (4,630 lb)
- Powerplant: 2 × Régnier 4G.0 4-cylinder inverted air-cooled in-line piston engines, 100 kW (140 hp) each

Performance

- Maximum speed: 310 km/h (190 mph, 170 kn)
