= Lioré et Olivier LeO H-22 =

LeO H-22
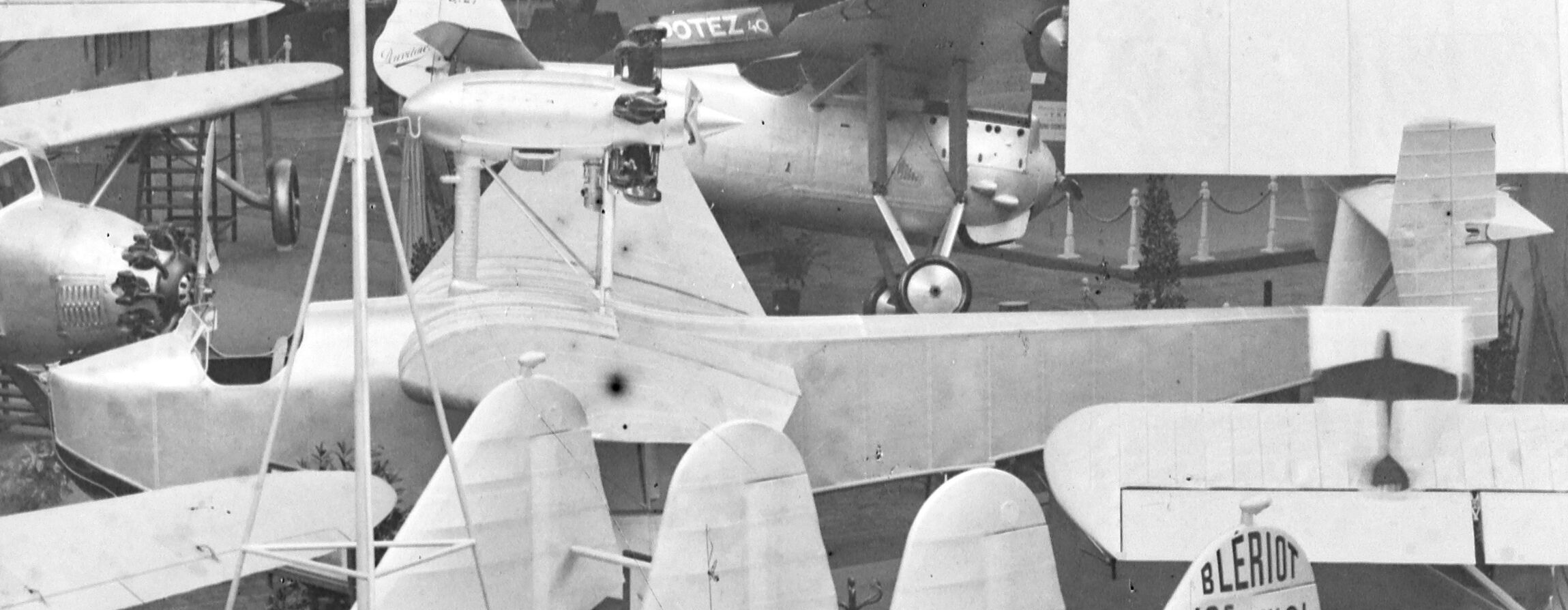
- LeO H-22 at Salon de l'Aviation 1930 in Paris.

General information
- Type: mail transport flying boat
- National origin: France
- Manufacturer: Lioré et Olivier
- Number built: 1

History
- First flight: 1931

The Lioré et Olivier LeO H-22 was a French amphibious plane, primarily intended for aerial mail transport.

== Design ==
The LeO H-22 was a flying boat with a three part cantilever high wing, primarily of both wood and metal construction. The Gnome-Rhône 5Bc 5-cylinder radial engine, driving apusherpropeller, was mounted in a streamlined nacelle, supported on struts, over the wing centre-section.

The LeO H-221 three-seat trainer flying boat, derived from the H-22, differed in cockpit arrangement and was powered by a 230 hp (170 kW) Salmson 9Ab 9-cylinder radial engine, also driving a pusher propeller.

== Variants ==
H-22
Airmail transport amphibious plane, Gnome-Rhône 5Bc 5-cylinder radial .
H-221
Trainer amphibious plane, Salmson 9Ab 9-cylinder radial.

== Specifications ==
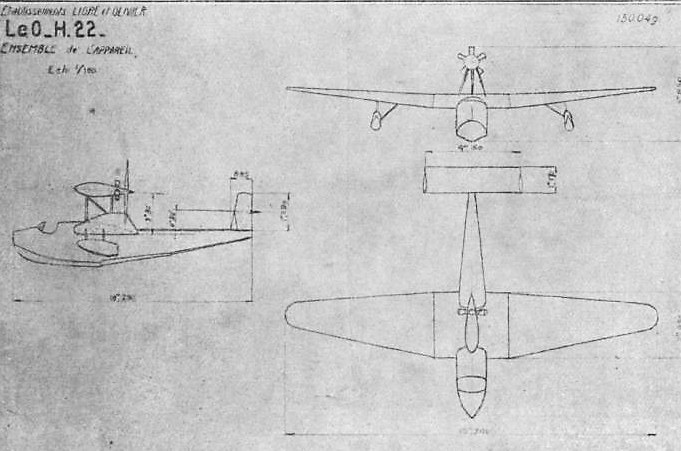

Data from

General characteristics

- Crew: 2

H-221 3

- Length: 10.70 m (35 ft 1 in)
- Wingspan: 15.94 m (52 ft 4 in)
- Height: 3.85 m (12 ft 8 in)
- Wing area: 33 m^{2} (360 sq ft)
- Empty weight: 1,234 kg (2,721 lb)

H-221 1,278 kg (2,818 lb)

- Gross weight: 1,800 kg (3,968 lb)

H-221 1,773 kg (3,909 lb)

- Powerplant: 1 × Gnome-Rhône 5Bc 5-cylinder air-cooled radial engine, 170 kW (230 hp)

H-221 1 x Salmson 9Ab 9-cylinder air-cooled radial engine 230 hp (170 kW)

- Propellers: 2-bladed fixed pitch pusher propeller

Performance

- Maximum speed: 175 km/h (109 mph, 94 kn) at ground level
- Range: 600 km (370 mi, 320 nmi)
