= Lioré et Olivier LeO H-180 =

French flying-boat

LeO H-180
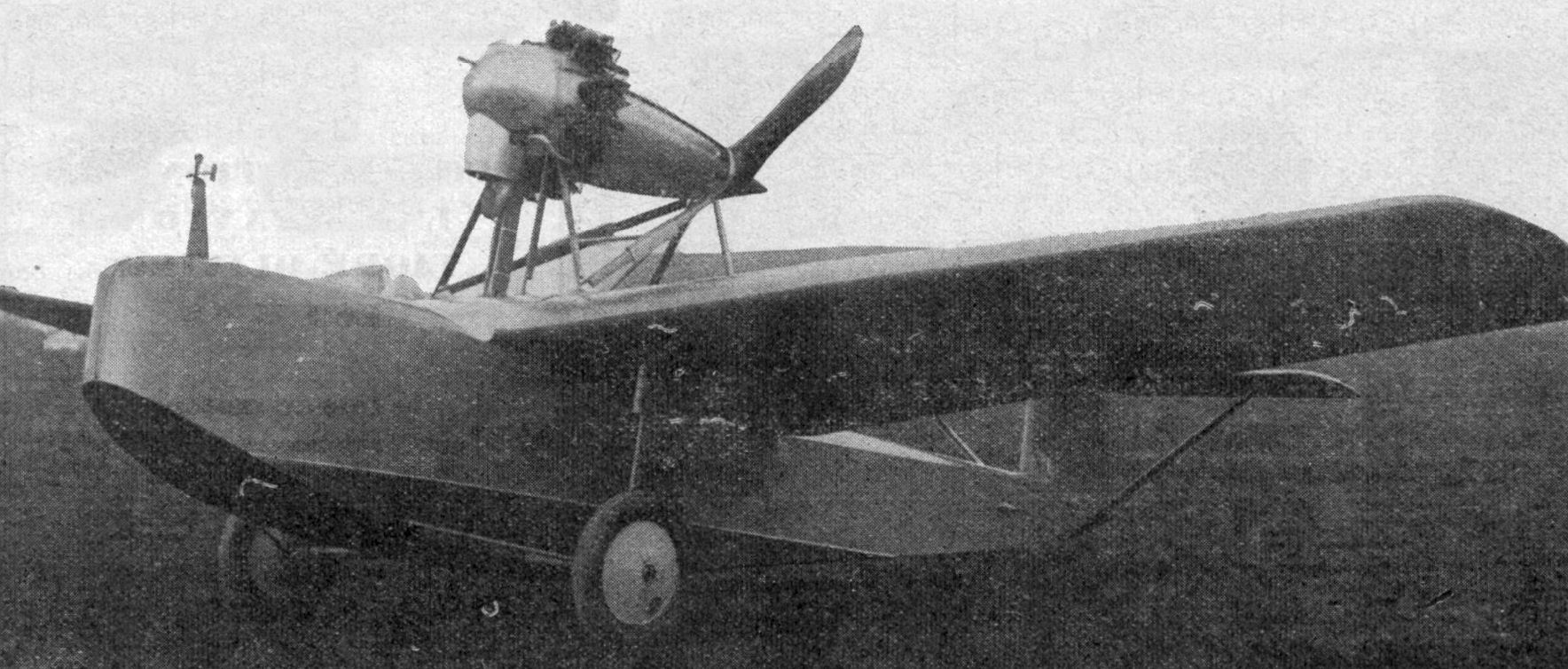

General information
- Type: Two-seat flying-boat
- National origin: France
- Manufacturer: Lioré et Olivier
- Number built: 6

History
- First flight: 1928

The Lioré et Olivier LeO H-180 was a 1920s French two-seat flying-boat built by Lioré et Olivier.

== Development ==
The H-180 first flew in 1928 and was a cantilever high-wing monoplane flying-boat. Powered by a 120 hp (89 kW) Salmson 9Ac engine strut-mounted above the fuselage. It had two side-by-side seats in an open cockpit but the following year it was fitted with an enclosed cockpit and re-designated the LeO H-181. The company intended to build a production batch of ten aircraft but only five H-181s were built. One aircraft was destroyed and the others finding no buyers were used as test aircraft by the company.

== Variants ==
H-180
Two-seat touring / training flying boat; 1 built.
H-181
An enclosed cockpit version, with increased span and longer fuselage; 5 built.

== Specifications (H-180) ==
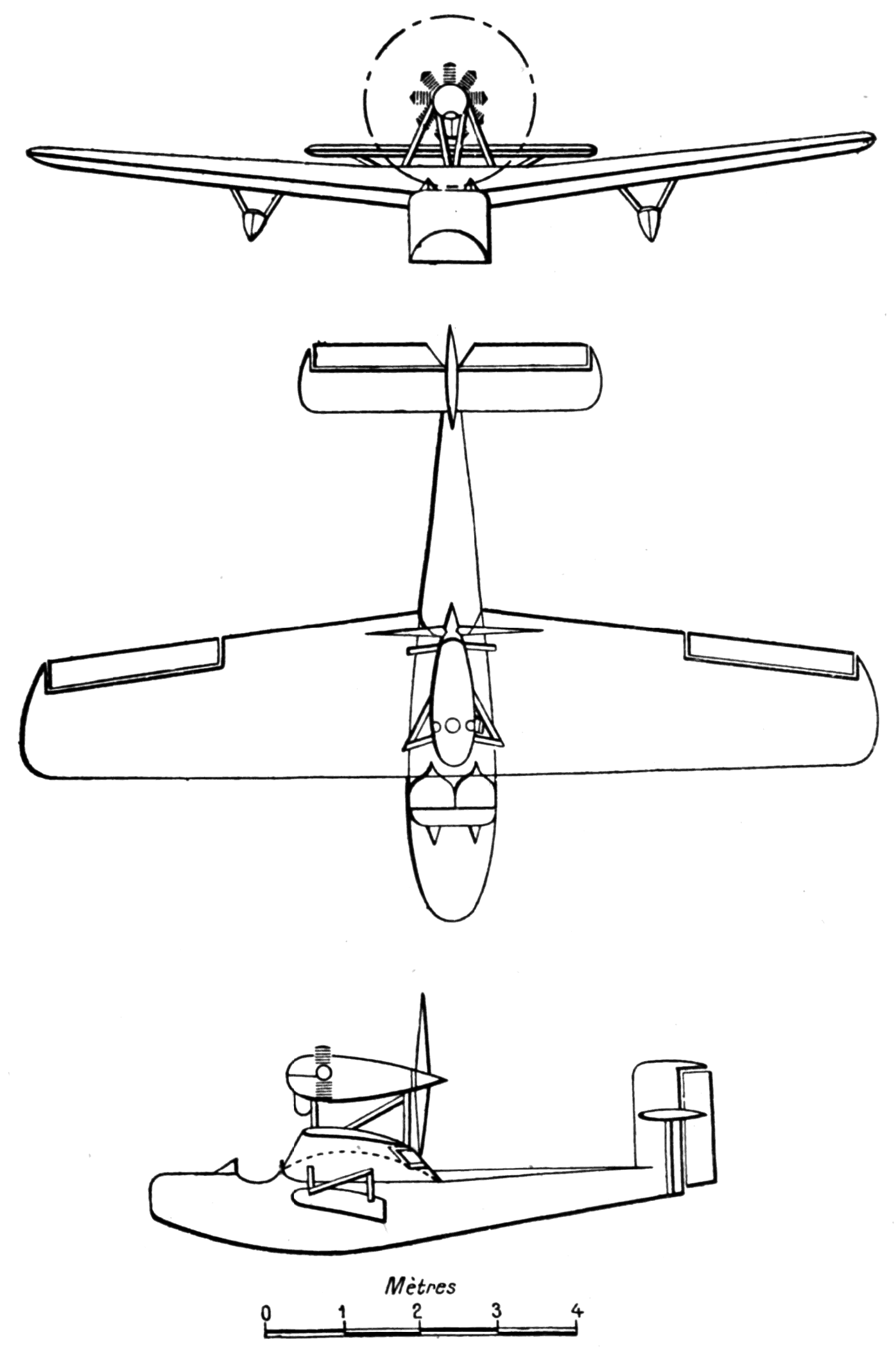
Lioré et Olivier LeO H-180 3-view drawing from L'Aéronautique June,1928

Data from Flight, Jane's all the World's Aircraft 1928

General characteristics

- Crew: 2, (1 pilot)
- Capacity: (1 pax)
- Length: 7.25 m (23 ft 9 in)
- Wingspan: 11.2 m (36 ft 9 in)
- Height: 2.2 m (7 ft 3 in)
- Wing area: 17.2 m^{2} (185 sq ft)
- Empty weight: 680 kg (1,499 lb)
- Gross weight: 960 kg (2,116 lb)
- Powerplant: 1 × Salmson 9Ac 9-cylinder air-cooled radial piston engine, 89 kW (120 hp)
- Propellers: 2-bladed fixed pitch pusher propeller

Performance

- Maximum speed: 165 km/h (103 mph, 89 kn)
- Cruise speed: 140 km/h (87 mph, 76 kn)
- Range: 520 km (320 mi, 280 nmi)
- Service ceiling: 3,500 m (11,500 ft)
- Time to altitude: 20 min to 2,000 m (6,600 ft)
- Wing loading: 55.8 kg/m^{2} (11.4 lb/sq ft)
- Power/mass: 0.09341 kW/kg (0.05682 hp/lb)

== See also ==
Related lists

- List of flying boats and floatplanes

== Bibliography ==
- Hartmann, Gérard. Les Avions Lioré Et Olivier. Boulogne-Billancourt, France: ETAI. 2002. ISBN 2-7268-8607-8 (in French)
