= Lioré et Olivier LeO H-23 =

LeO H-23
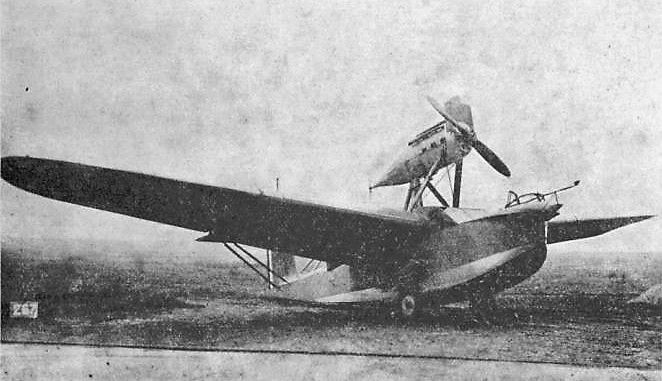

General information
- Type: Amphibious reconnaissance flying boat
- National origin: France
- Manufacturer: Lioré et Olivier
- Number built: 1

History
- First flight: early June 1930

The Lioré et Olivier LeO H-23 was a French military flying boat, primarily intended for coastal reconnaissance, though able to carry a small bomb load. Only one was built.

== Design ==
The LeO H-23 was a flying boat with a three part cantilever high wing which was trapezoidal in plan out to roughly elliptical tips. The centre section filled just over half of the span and was very thick at the roots but the wing thinned continuously outboard over both centre and outer panels. There was about 4.5° of dihedral. Its ailerons were on the outer panels. The wing was completely wooden and covered in plywood.

Like the wings, the hull was made of wood. The bottom had a single, small step and was relatively flat-bottomed and without a sharp central V-form cross-section, rather having gentle double curvature flattening towards the chines. Above the chines the hull sides were flat and vertical, with the wing mounted on top. On each side an unstepped metal float was mounted from two pairs of parallel struts at the outer end of the wing centre-section to stabilise the aircraft on water. There was a large, open position in the nose for an observer/bombardier, provided with a pair of machine guns on a flexible mount, who could also take bearings and provide signals. The LeO H-23 had an enclosed cockpit just ahead of the wing leading edge with two side-by-side seats and dual controls. The remaining crew position was a dorsal cockpit in the rear fuselage, well behind the wing and where the top of the hull had curved decking. This post was equipped, like the one in the nose, with twin machine guns and also housed radio equipment and a camera. The crew communicated with each other through speaking tubes. At the rear the fin was large and almost rectangular, as was the rudder. Its tailplane was mounted about halfway up the fin, braced from below with a pair of divergent struts on each side. The horizontal tail had high aspect ratio and both tailplane and elevator had rectangular plans.

The LeO H-23 was powered by a 450 kW (600 hp) Hispano-Suiza 12N tractor configuration water-cooled V-12 engine, strut-mounted high above the wing and the cockpit. It was in a long, tapered engine cowling which stretched back almost to the trailing edge but its rectangular honeycomb radiator was immediately behind the propeller, standing proud above the engine. Fuel was in a combination of wing and hull tanks.

It was an amphibious aircraft; its landing gear had two retractable mainwheels and a small leaf spring tailskid. Two small, streamlined structures, each close to the fuselage side a little above the waterline and mounted on a pair of parallel struts from the forward wing spar, carried the undercarriage legs, a vertical shock absorber and a trailing arm meeting at the wheel axle, which could be rotated together to a horizontal position for touchdowns on water. The undercarriage track was 2.15 m (7 ft 1 in). Fitting the wheeled undercarriage increased the weight by 155 kg (342 lb) and reduced maximum speeds by about 5 km/h (3 mph; 3 kn).

== Development ==
Two prototypes were funded by the government, as usual, but only one was built. the first flight was in early June 1930, piloted by Bourdin at Villacoublay. More flights were made during the following week, after which it was flown off the sea at Saint-Raphaël. It was judged worth further testing and after some hull modifications it was transferred to Bizerte in the then French colony of Tunisia for full evaluation but was lost in an accident after logging 83 hours of flight.

== Specifications ==
All performance figures calculated

Data from Les Ailes 19 June 1930

General characteristics

- Crew: Four
- Length: 12.19 m (40 ft 0 in)
- Wingspan: 19.70 m (64 ft 8 in)
- Height: 4.84 m (15 ft 11 in)
- Wing area: 52 m^{2} (560 sq ft)
- Aspect ratio: 7.5
- Empty weight: 2,150 kg (4,740 lb)
- Gross weight: 3,410 kg (7,518 lb)
- Fuel capacity: 610 kg (1,340 lb)
- Powerplant: 1 × Hispano-Suiza 12N liquid-cooled V-12 engine, 450 kW (600 hp)
- Propellers: 2-bladed

Performance

- Maximum speed: 200 km/h (120 mph, 110 kn) at ground level
- Cruise speed: 165 km/h (103 mph, 89 kn)
- Range: 1,000 km (620 mi, 540 nmi) at cruising speed and at 1,500 m (4,900 ft)
- Time to altitude: 9 min 30 sec to 5,000 m (16,000 ft)

Armament

- Guns: Two pairs of machine guns on flexible mounts in nose and dorsal positions.
- Bombs: Two 75 kg (165 lb) bombs.
