= Lioré et Olivier LeO H-47 =

French flying boat airplane built in 1936

LeO H-47
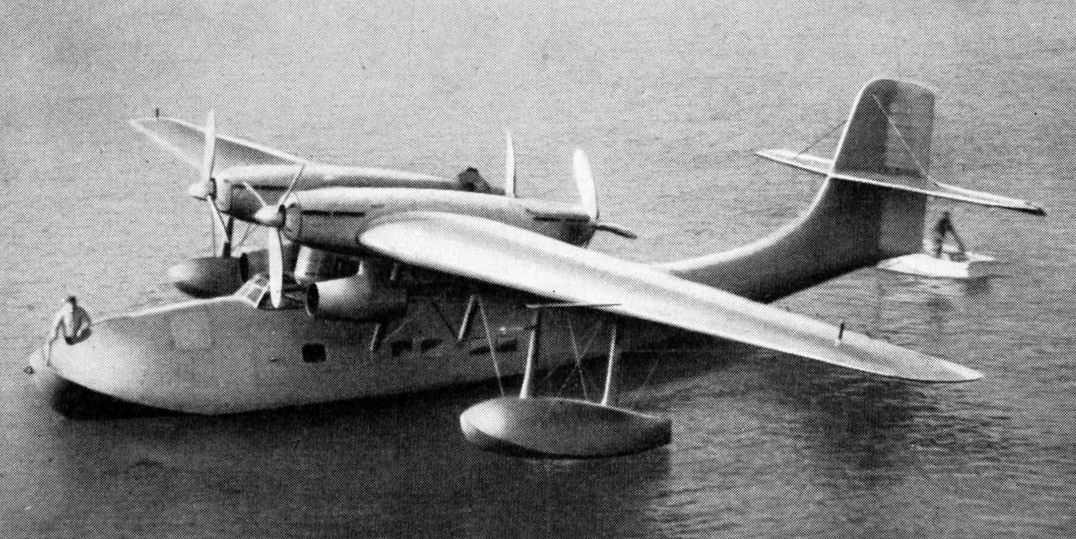

General information
- Type: Airliner
- National origin: France
- Manufacturer: Lioré et Olivier
- Number built: 6

History
- First flight: 25 July 1936
- Retired: 1943

The Lioré et Olivier LeO H-47 was a flying boat airliner built in France in 1936. It was designed to operate passenger services over the South Atlantic, but the outbreak of the Second World War caused the type to be used by the French Navy as a maritime patrol aircraft.

== Development and design ==
In 1934, the French air ministry issued a specification for a long-range flying boat to be used by Air France on services over the South Atlantic between Dakar in Senegal and Natal in Brazil. As such, the specification required that the new transport be capable of flying 3,000 km (1,900 mi) at a speed of 250 km/h (160 mph) while carrying a payload of 1,000 kg (2,200 lb). Lioré et Olivier received an order for a prototype of its design to meet this specification, the LeO H-47 on 10 August 1935.

The H-47 was a cantilever high-wing monoplane, with a streamlined hull. A flight deck, which accommodated a crew of five (two pilots, a navigator, a radio operator and a mechanic) and a cabin for four to eight passengers were fully enclosed within the aircraft's hull. The four 660 kW (880 hp) Hispano Suiza 12Y engines were mounted in two tractor-pusher pairs above the wing.

The prototype H-47 first flew from Antibes on 25 July 1936, and was destroyed in a crash in May 1937 that was attributed to a wingtip float breaking away whilst the aircraft was in flight. Nevertheless, Air France went ahead with the purchase of five similar (though strengthened) machines, designated H-470, which were put into service as mail planes. These machines were impressed into the French Navy at the outbreak of the Second World War.

The four remaining aircraft remained in use with the Vichy French Navy following the French Armistice, serving as transports between France and Tunisia, before being transferred to Dakar in Senegal in June 1941. The last H-470 was scrapped in August 1943 when stocks of spares ran out.

== Operators ==
France

- Air France
- French Navy

Vichy France

- Vichy French Air Force

== Specifications ==
General characteristics

- Crew: 2
- Capacity: 12 passengers
- Length: 21.20 m (69 ft 7 in)
- Wingspan: 31.80 m (104 ft 4 in)
- Height: 7.10 m (23 ft 4 in)
- Wing area: 135.0 m^{2} (1,452 sq ft)
- Empty weight: 10,465 kg (23,023 lb)
- Gross weight: 19,713 kg (43,389 lb)
- Powerplant: 4 × Hispano-Suiza 12Ydrs , 650 kW (860 hp) each

Performance

- Maximum speed: 360 km/h (225 mph, 196 kn)
- Range: 3,200 km (2,000 mi, 1,700 nmi)
- Service ceiling: 7,000 m (23,000 ft)

== See also ==
Related lists

- List of aircraft of World War II
