= Lioré et Olivier LeO 20 =

LeO 20
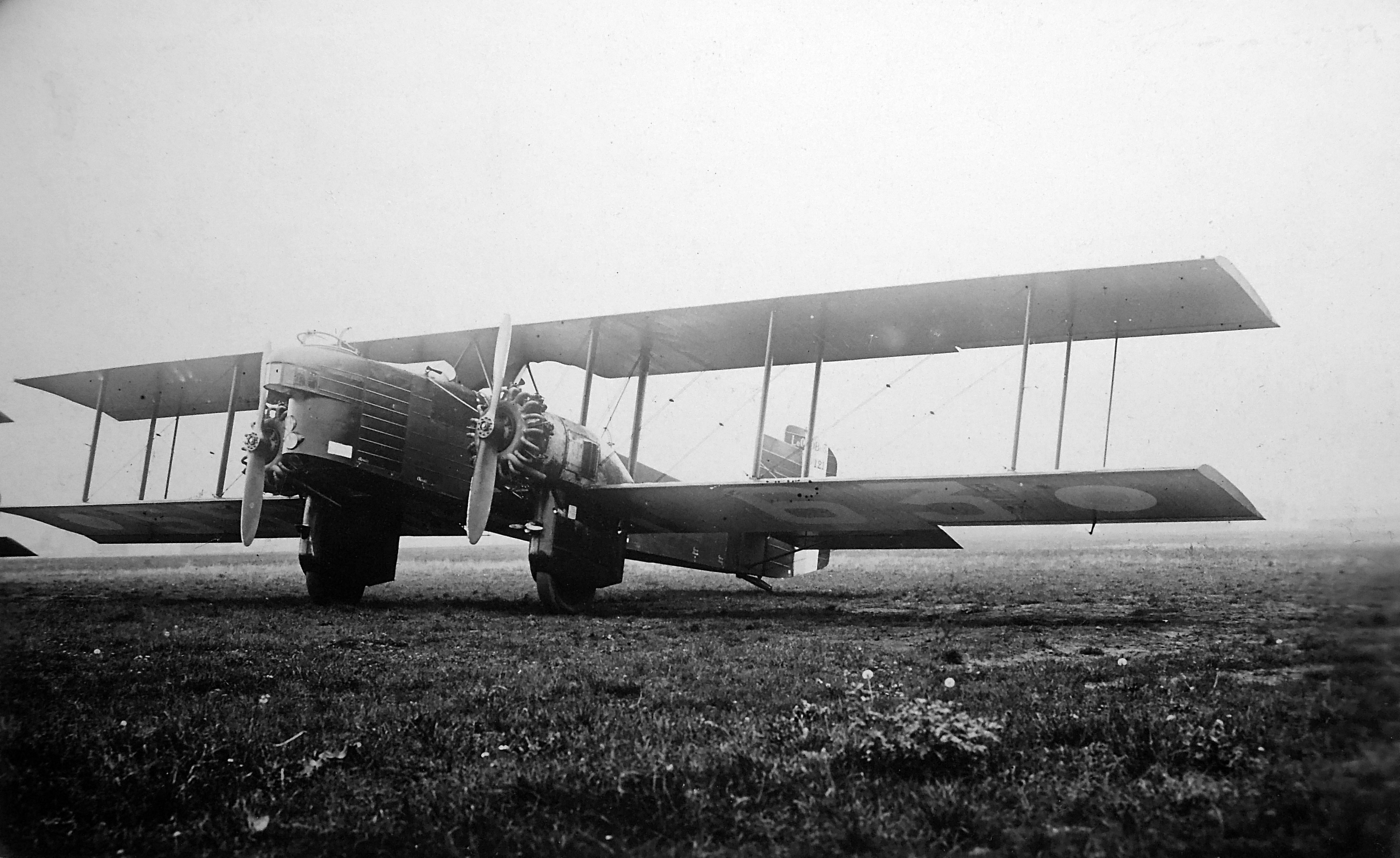
- Lioré et Olivier LeO 20

General information
- Type: night-bomber
- National origin: France
- Manufacturer: Lioré et Olivier
- Status: retired
- Primary user: French Air Force
- Number built: 320

History
- Introduction date: 1928
- First flight: 1927
- Retired: 1939
- Developed from: Lioré et Olivier LeO 122

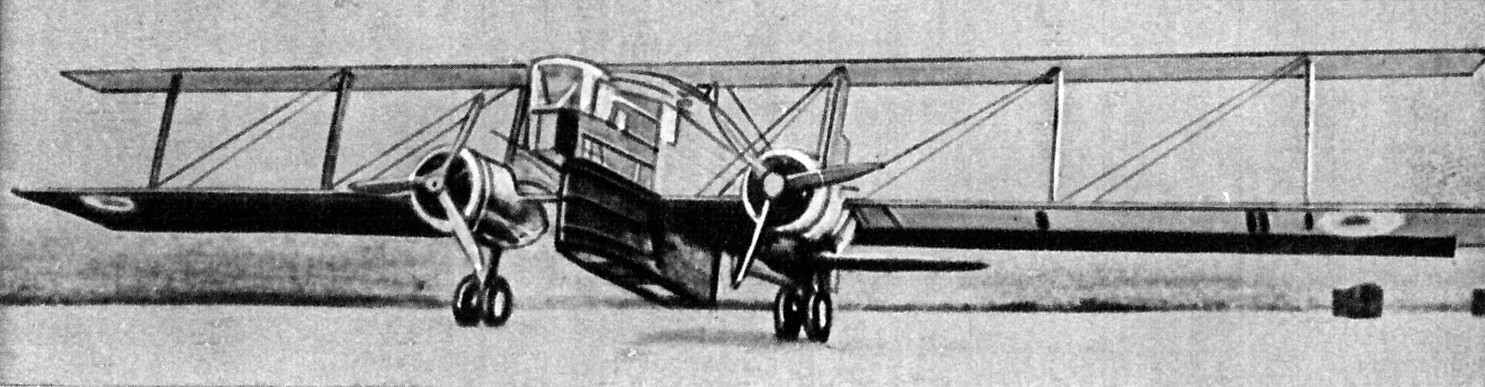
LeO 208

The Lioré et Olivier LeO 20 was a French night-bomber aircraft built by Lioré et Olivier.

== Development ==
The LeO 20 was a development of the LeO 122 prototype. It won the 1926 French ministry competition for a new night-bomber, and received an order for 50 aircraft. The first were delivered at the end of 1926 and flight tested at Villacoublay in 1927. A total of 311 aircraft were delivered to the French air arm, ending in December 1932.

== Variants ==
LeO 20
twin-engine night bomber with Gnome-Rhône 9Ady engines (320 built)
LeO 201
re-designation for parachute trainers converted from LeO 20
LeO 203
four-engine version with Gnome-Rhône 7Kb engines
LeO H-20/4
floatplane version of LeO 203
LeO 206
production version of LeO 203 with revised nose, ventral "balcony" and tail gun (37 built)
LeO 207
similar to LeO 206 but with different nose and smaller "balcony" (3 built)
LeO 208
similar to LeO 20 but with enclosed cabin and Gnome-Rhône 14Mrs engines

== Operators/Units using this aircraft ==
France

- French Air Force
  - 21st Regiments d'Aviation
  - 22nd Regiments d'Aviation
  - 12th Regiments d'Aviation
  - 34th Regiments d'Aviation
  - Aeronautique Militaire School
- French Navy

Romania

- Royal Romanian Air Force

== Specifications (LeO 20) ==
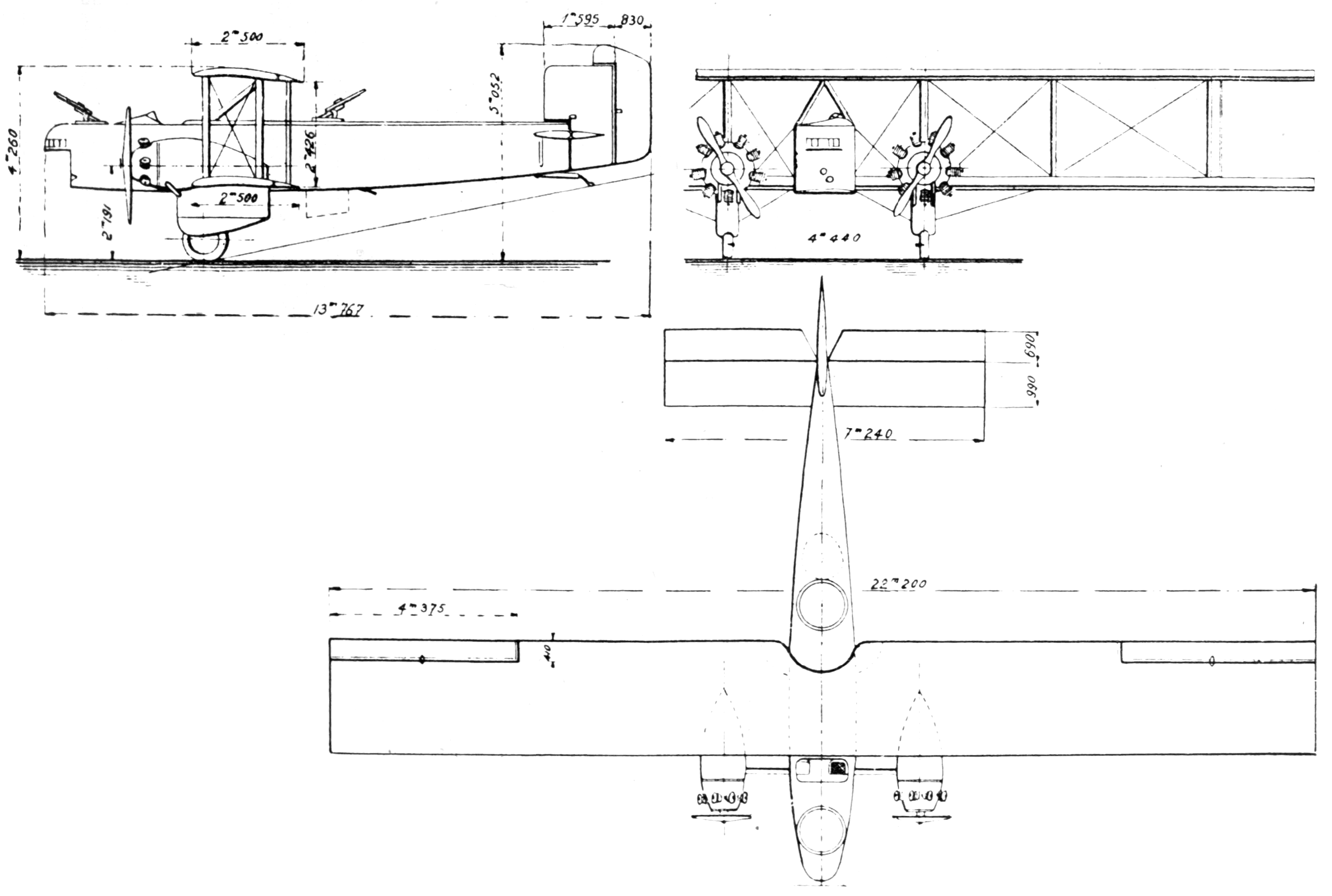
Lioré et Olivier LeO 20 3-view drawing from L'Air May 15, 1928

Data from Jane's all the World's Aircraft 1928,

General characteristics

- Crew: 3
- Length: 13.77 m (45 ft 2 in)
- Wingspan: 22.2 m (72 ft 10 in)
- Height: 4.26 m (14 ft 0 in)
- Wing area: 105 m^{2} (1,130 sq ft)
- Empty weight: 2,580 kg (5,688 lb)
- Gross weight: 5,060 kg (11,155 lb)
- Max takeoff weight: 5,600 kg (12,346 lb)
- Powerplant: 2 × Gnome et Rhône 9Ady Jupiter 9-cylinder air-cooled radial piston engine, 360 kW (480 hp) each
- Propellers: 2-bladed fixed pitch wooden propellers

Performance

- Maximum speed: 196 km/h (122 mph, 106 kn) at sea level

189 km/h (117 mph; 102 kn) at 3,000 m (9,800 ft)

- Range: 1,000 km (620 mi, 540 nmi)
- Service ceiling: 5,750 m (18,860 ft)
- Time to altitude: 3,000 m (9,800 ft) in 18.6 minutes
- Wing loading: 48.2 kg/m^{2} (9.9 lb/sq ft)
- Power/mass: 0.1208 kW/kg (0.0735 hp/lb)

Armament

- Guns: provision for 2 × 7.7 mm (0.30 in) machine-guns at nose and dorsal positions and 1 × 7.7 mm (0.30 in) machine-gun at ventral position.
- Bombs: 10 × 50 kg (110 lb) bombs internally or 7 × 70 kg (150 lb) bombs under the centre-section/centre fuselage; maximum 500 kg (1,100 lb)

== See also ==
Related lists

- List of Interwar military aircraft

== Bibliography ==
- Hartmann, Gérard. Les Avions Lioré Et Olivier. Boulogne-Billancourt, France: ETAI. 2002. ISBN 2-7268-8607-8 (in French)
