= Fokker T.VIII =

1938 torpedo bomber floatplane

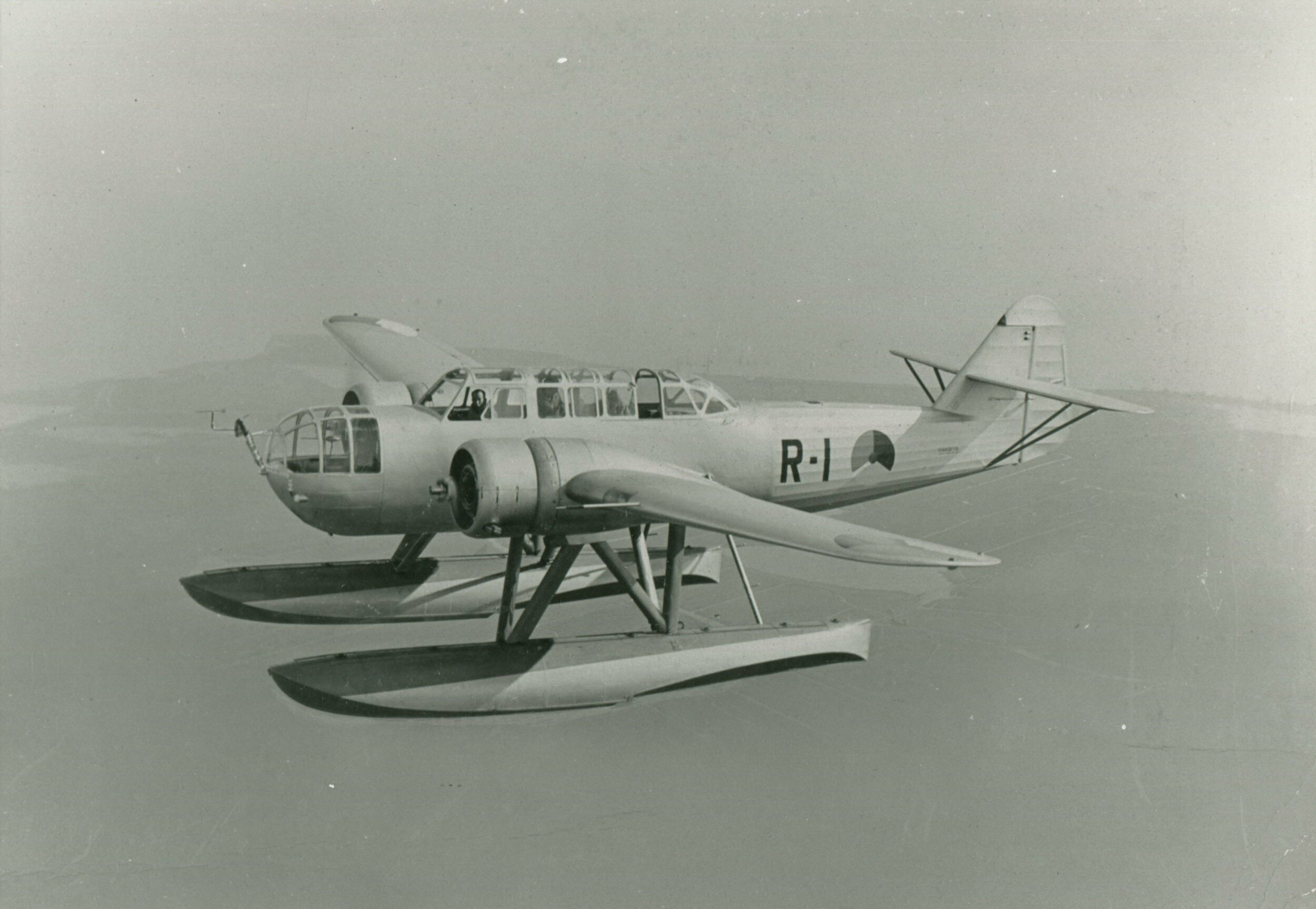
- T.VIII in flight

General information
- Type: Torpedo-bomber seaplane
- Manufacturer: Fokker
- Primary users: Marine-Luchtvaartdienst Royal Air Force; Luftwaffe
- Number built: 36

History
- Introduction date: 1939
- First flight: 1938

The Fokker T.VIII is a twin-engined torpedo bomber and aerial reconnaissance floatplane designed and manufactured by the Dutch aviation company Fokker.

It was developed in the late 1930s as a successor to the Fokker T.IV. While the Dutch Naval Aviation Service had originally intended to use it in home waters and in the Dutch East Indies, the Second World War broke out as production was beginning to meet these needs. The Royal Air Force (RAF) and the Luftwaffe operated small numbers of the type.

== Development ==
=== Background ===
During the early 1930s, one of the consequences of the Great Depression was that many countries had little to spare for military procurement, even in light of ageing and obsolete aircraft. The Netherlands was no exception to this trend, however, following the rise to power of Nazism in neighbouring Germany, several Dutch officers and politicians recognised that military modernisation was increasingly necessary, particularly in the field of aviation. One requirement identified during 1937 by the Royal Netherlands Navy was for a new floatplane for coastal defense and aerial reconnaissance operations, which could be alternatively armed with either bombs or air-dropped torpedoes.

The choice to specify a torpedo armament was unusual for the time as, throughout the interwar period, such weapons had been considered to be extravagant and unaffordable, despite interest in using such munitions being held by some officers. Based on this interest, launching trials were performed using a specially-adapted Fokker C.V landplane, which successfully validated the concept. While the torpedo-armed Fokker T.IV had been conceived to perform such missions, by the late 1930s the type had become outdated and never actually carried such weapons in combat. The Dutch naval staff considered the procurement of a modern twin-engined floatplane that could carry a single torpedo internally to be a priority and approached Dutch aircraft manufacturer Fokker with this requirement during 1937.

The specification defined the aircraft as being foremost for coastal defence operations. It demanded that the prospective aircraft possess both a top speed of at least 175 MPH and considerable endurance, both factors making long-distance reconnaissance flights over the North Sea possible. In order to house the desired armaments necessitated a fairly-large payload capacity as well, along with a crew of three to operate the aircraft. It was also to be powered by a pair of engines capable of producing between 400 hp and 700 hp. Fokker decided to respond to this specification and submit its own design, known by the company designation T.VIII.

=== Orders and flight testing ===
During 1938, an initial order for five aircraft of Fokker's new design was issued. By early 1939, the first of these aircraft was ready to flight, while all five were completed by 1 June of that year. Despite some initial issues, the Netherlands Naval Aviation Service was largely satisfied with the type's performance and a follow-on order for a larger batch of 26 aircraft was received. It was intended for the older Fokker T.IV aircraft to be entirely withdrawn in favour of the T.VIIIs from this second batch, including those stationed in the Dutch East Indies, but such plans were disrupted by the outbreak of the Second World War.

Deliveries of the type continued despite the onset of war as, during the early period known as the Phoney War, the Netherlands maintained neutrality in the conflict. In spring 1940, the first example of the improved T.VIII W/M model was completed; at this point in time, aircraft were being delivered from Fokker's production line so hastily that the paint had not yet dried; the Dutch military were still receiving T.VIIIs during the opening days of the Battle of the Netherlands.

The Dutch were not the only party interested in procuring the type; during early 1939, the government of Finland had developed a similar requirement for such an aircraft, albeit requiring somewhat higher performance figures, as well as a land-based version. Fokker decided to draw up a development of the T.VIII to meet this need, which not only gained the interest of Finland but Sweden as well. During 1939, a Finnish order for the improved T.VIII-L was received; this same variant was also proposed to the Royal Netherlands Army in its land-based configuration.

== Design ==
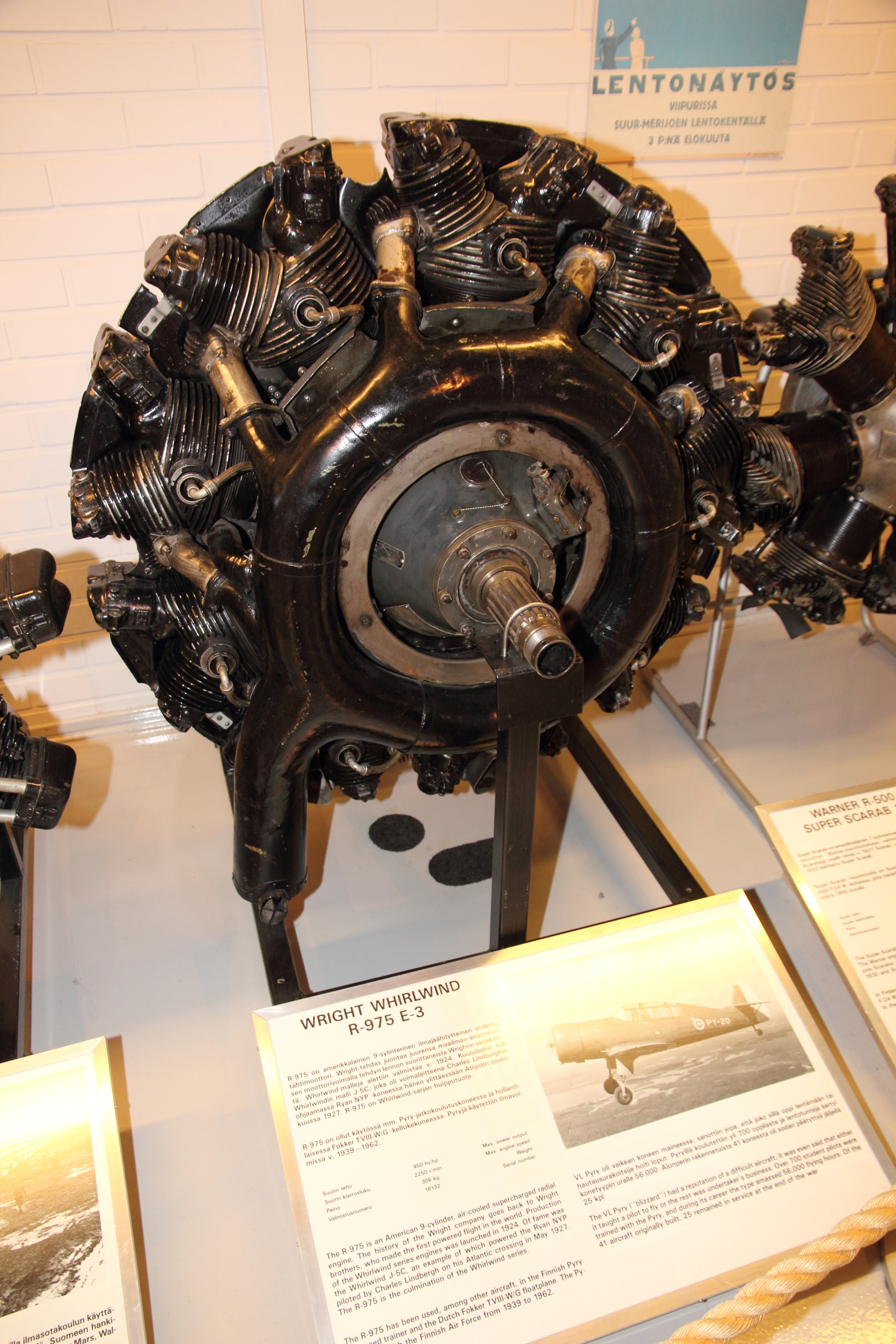
Wright Whirlwind R-975 E-3 engine

The Fokker T.VIII was a twin-engined monoplane floatplane, featuring a three-part fuselage of oval cross-section and a mid-wing configuration. The first fuselage section consisted of a monocoque light alloy construction, while the centre section was all-wood and had incorporated the wing as well; the rear fuselage section was largely made of steel tubing and fabric. The undercarriage consisted of a pair of floats composed of rust-proof duralumin; internally, each float contained six waterproof compartments along with an auxiliary fuel tank.

The aircraft's construction changed throughout its manufacture. While the T.VIII W/G model featured a wing comprising a pair of cross-beams with bakelite ribs and clad in plywood, as well as a steel-framed tail covered by fabric; for the later-built T.VIII W/M variant, both the tail and the wing were constructed from a lightweight alloy instead. At the time of the T.VII's development, Fokker was developing new construction methods that involved transitioning from traditional mixed-construction to an all-metal approach.

The nose section, which housed the aircraft's observer, featured several large plexiglass windows for external visibility and a bomb-aiming panel in the floor in front of him. Behind the observer's position was the cockpit, in which the pilot was seated on the left side adjacent to the wing's leading edge; directly behind the pilot was the third crew member, who was a combined Wireless operator/tail gunner. The movable rear gun was fitted to a retractable mounting; the pilot could also fire a fixed forward-facing machine gun. A maximum payload of 1,330 lbs of either torpedoes or bombs would be carried within a hold within the wing's center section; this hold was furnished with hydraulically-actuated doors. Fuel was principally housed in tanks between the main spars on the wings.

== Operational history ==
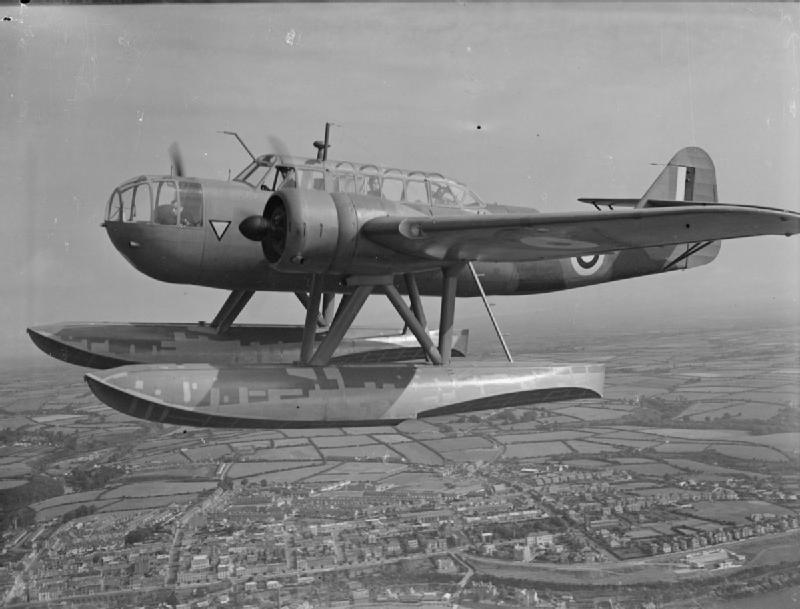
An RAF Fokker T.VIII, operated by No. 320 Squadron

The aircraft went into production almost immediately following the type's first flight in 1938; a total of eleven T.VIIIs entered service with the Netherlands Naval Aviation Service. Initial operations were dominated by trials and training missions, aiming to familiarise Dutch personnel with the aircraft's operation. By September 1939, the month during which the Second World War broke out, the type was used to patrol Dutch territorial waters, intending to guard against violations of Dutch neutrality by the forces of either side. On 13 September 1939, a T.VIII was attacked by a German Dornier Do 18 flying boat; the aircraft was destroyed while attempting to land and the crew captured by the Germans; this incident led to a change in Dutch aircraft markings from the red, white, and blue roundel to an orange triangle so that Dutch aircraft would be more readily distinguishable from either their British or French counterparts.

Having anticipated a German invasion of the Netherlands, military planners had already directed that the T.VIIIs be dispersed prior to May 1940. Immediately following the German invasion in 1940, nine aircraft were relocated to bases in France; while some reconnaissance missions were flown early on, these were soon suspended in the face of German aerial superiority. On 22 May 1940, these aircraft escaped to the United Kingdom; notably, one T.VIII was used to aid in the escape of two members of the Dutch Cabinet. Those aircraft that reached Britain would form the nucleus of No. 320 (Netherlands) Squadron RAF, Coastal Command, based at Pembroke Dock in Pembrokeshire, South Wales. The unit performed numerous convoy escort and anti-submarine patrols, aiming to detect and attack Germany raiding forces. It was also used for espionage operations as a liaison aircraft for contacting members of the Dutch resistance on the continent. Eventually, a lack of spares meant that these aircraft become unserviceable and were retired; their Dutch crews were transferred to newly-procured Lockheed Hudson light bombers.

The Germans also acquired a number of T.VIIIs, having captured multiple partially-completed airframes that had still been under construction at the Fokker factory. They were ordered to be completed for use by the Kriegsmarine; once finished, each example received an evaluation at Travemünde before delivery to Germany. German-operated T.VIIIs largely saw use in the Mediterranean Sea, where they performed numerous reconnaissance, air-sea rescue and anti-submarine missions.

Early on 6 May 1941 four men – former Lieutenant Govert Steen and Corporal Evert Willem Boomsma, both of the Army Aviation Brigade, along with Fokker technician Wijbert Lindeman, and former Dutch Army Lieutenant Jan Beelaerts van Blokland – swam out to the Fokker T.VIIw TD+CL moored on the Minervahaven on the IJ in Amsterdam. At dawn they managed to take off (Steen, a fighter pilot, had never flown the type before) and flew to England, evading British anti-aircraft fire, and landing at Broadstairs, Kent. Beelaerts van Blokland and Lindeman joined the Princess Irene Brigade, with Beelaerts van Blokland becoming its commander during operations in Normandy, while Steen joined No. 129 Squadron RAF, flying 79 sorties before being shot down and killed on 5 June 1942.

== Variants ==
T.VIII W/G
Mixed wood and metal construction. 19 built.
T.VIII W/M
All-metal construction. 12 built.
T.VIII W/C
Larger version with more powerful engines. Five had been ordered by Finland, but were captured and used by the Luftwaffe.

== Operators ==
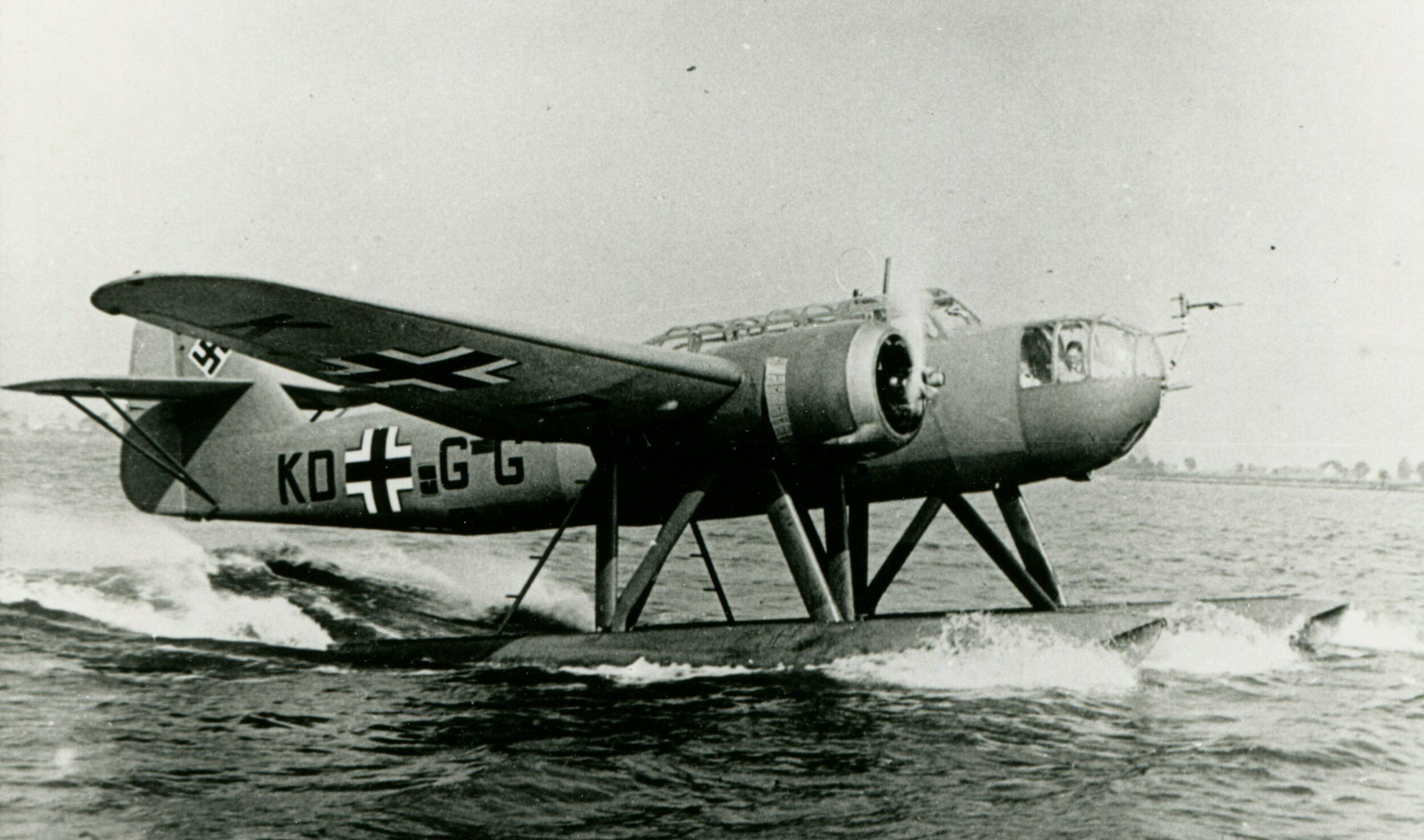
Fokker T.VIII W/C built for Finland re-purposed by the Luftwaffe.

Finland

- Finnish Air Force ordered 5 T.VIII W/C but none were delivered.

Germany

- Luftwaffe operated several captured aircraft.

Netherlands

- Netherlands Naval Aviation Service

United Kingdom

- Royal Air Force

== Specifications (T.VIII W/G) ==
Data from Encyclopedia of Military Aircraft, The Fokker T.VIII

General characteristics

- Crew: 3
- Length: 13 m (42 ft 8 in)
- Wingspan: 18 m (59 ft 1 in)
- Height: 5 m (16 ft 5 in)
- Gross weight: 5,000 kg (11,023 lb)
- Powerplant: 2 × Wright R-975-E3 Whirlwind 9-cyl. air-cooled radial piston engines, 340 kW (450 hp) each

Performance

- Maximum speed: 285 km/h (177 mph, 154 kn) at 3,000 m (9,800 ft)
- Range: 2,750 km (1,710 mi, 1,480 nmi)
- Service ceiling: 6,800 m (22,300 ft)

Armament

- 2 × 7.92 (0.312 in) machine guns
- 600 kg (1,323 lb) of bombs or torpedoes

== See also ==
Aircraft of comparable role, configuration, and era

- Bloch MB.480
- Blohm & Voss Ha 140
- Hall XPTBH
- SNCAC NC.4-10

Related lists

- List of aircraft of the Royal Air Force
- List of aircraft of World War II
- List of military aircraft of Germany
- List of flying boats and floatplanes
