= SNCAO 700 =

CAO.700

General information
- Type: Heavy bomber
- National origin: France
- Manufacturer: SNCAO
- Number built: 1

The SNCAO CAO.700 (Note: Sometimes written CAO-700 or CAO 700) was a French prototype four-engined bomber of all-metal construction, developed shortly prior to and during the Second World War. Only a single example was built, and was on the point of being flown for the first timewhen the surrender of France in June 1940 ended testing and development of the aircraft.

== Design and development ==
In early 1937 the French Service Technique de l'Aeronautique (or Air Ministry) issued specification A20 for a four-engined heavy bomber to replace the Armée de l'Air's outdated Farman F.221 and F.221s. The specification required that the aircraft be capable of delivering 1,800 kg (4,000 lb) of bombs to a range of 1,200 km (750 mi; 650 nmi) or 3,600 kg (7,900 lb) of bombs to 700 km (430 mi; 380 nmi), cruising at a speed of 450 km/h (280 mph; 240 kn) (increased to 470 km/h (290 mph; 250 kn) in 1938) at 4,000 m (13,000 ft). SNCAO's design, the CAO.700, was designed by its Saint-Nazaire design team, formerly the design team of Loire-Neuport before the nationalisation of the French aircraft industry. In order to speed design of the aircraft, it used the fuselage of the Loire-Nieuport 10 floatplane, combined with a new wing, while the engine installation was based on that of the Lioré et Olivier LeO 451, with four Gnome-Rhône 14N-49 clockwise-rotating radial engines in close-fitting Mercier cowlings and driving three-bladed Ratier propellers (as used on the starboard wing of the LeO 451).

The aircraft was of all-metal, stressed-skin construction, and had a crew of five. The pilot and co-pilot sat in tandem on the port side of an enclosed cockpit, with a bomb-aimer/navigator in the nose, a dorsal gunner operating a powered cannon-equipped turret aft of the trailing edge of the wing, and a radio operator sitting further aft. Defensive armament was a single flexibly-mounted 7.5 mm MAC 1934 machine gun in the nose, operated by the bomb-aimer/navigator, with a further two flexibly-mounted MAC 1934s firing from a ventral position operated by the radio operator and a single 20 mm Hispano-Suiza HS.404 autocannon in the dorsal turret. A 5.8 m (19 ft) long bomb bay could carry 3,000 kg (6,600 lb), while auxiliary bomb bays in the wing roots could carry a further four 225 kg (496 lb) bombs.

== Operational history ==
In June 1940, the incomplete prototype was transferred by rail from the factory at Saint-Nazaire to Istres where the aircraft was assembled in preparation for its first flight. Work on the prototype was delayed by shortages of skilled personnel owing to the mobilization of workers because of the war situation, and lack of equipment at Istres. On 24 June the prototype was taxiing out to the runway ready to make its maiden flight when news of the Armistice with Germany reached Istres, resulting in the commander of the airfield to order the crew of the CAO.700 to stop taxiing the aircraft and abandon the planned test flight. No further attempts were made to fly the prototype.

== Variants ==
CAO.700 B5
Standard five-man heavy bomber, powered by Gnome-Rhône 14N-49 engines.
CAO.700M
(Marine) Proposed long-range naval reconnaissance aircraft, with up to 18 hour endurance.
CAO.710
Proposed improved heavy bomber with four 980 kW (1,320 hp) Gnome-Rhône 14R engines and increased wingspan.
CAO.720
Proposed pressurised 15-passenger airliner. Work on this airliner derivative was stopped in December 1940 on instructions from Germany, with the Saint-Nazaire factory being ordered to build Arado Ar-196 floatplanes.

== Specifications ==
Data from Warplanes of the Second World War: Bombers and Reconnaissance Aircraft: Volume Seven

General characteristics

- Crew: 5
- Length: 18.85 m (61 ft 10 in)
- Wingspan: 25.00 m (82 ft 0 1/4 in)
- Height: 6.10 m (20 ft 0 in)
- Wing area: 88.00 m^{2} (947.2 sq ft)
- Empty weight: 11,390 kg (25,111 lb)
- Gross weight: 18,069 kg (39,835 lb)
- Powerplant: 4 × Gnome-Rhône 14N-49 fourteen-cylinder air-cooled radial engine, 850 kW (1,140 hp) each (take-off power), 772 kW (1,035 hp) at 4,800 m (15,750 ft)

Performance

- Maximum speed: 540 km/h (335 mph, 290 kn) at 5,300 m (17,385 ft)
- Cruise speed: 320 km/h (200 mph, 170 kn) at 16,400 ft (5,000 m)
- Range: 2,200 km (1,400 mi, 1,200 nmi)
- Service ceiling: 5,500 m (18,000 ft)

Armament

- Guns:
  - 1 × 7.5mm MAC 1934 machinegun in flexible nose mounts,
  - 2 × 7.5 mm machine guns in flexible ventral mount and
  - 1 × 20mm HS.404 cannon in dorsal turret
- Bombs: 3,900 kg (8,600 lb) bombs

== See also ==
Related development

- Loire-Nieuport 10

Aircraft of comparable role, configuration and era

- Boeing B-17
- Focke-Wulf Fw 200
- Handley Page Halifax
- Short Stirling
