= Loire 30 =

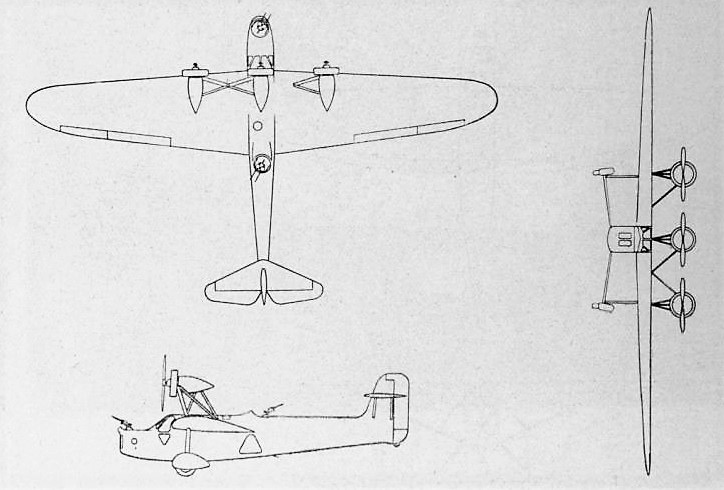

General information
- Type: Night reconnaissance monoplane
- National origin: France
- Manufacturer: Loire
- Number built: 1

History
- First flight: 1932

The Loire 30 a.k.a.Loire 300 was a French three-seat night reconnaissance monoplane designed and built by Loire Aviation of St. Nazaire.

== Design and development ==
The Loire 30 was designed to meet a French Air Force requirement for a three-seat night reconnaissance aircraft. It was a cantilever high-wing monoplane and powered by three 230 hp (172 kW) Salmson 9Ab radial engines strut-mounted above the wing. The pilot had an enclosed cockpit with an open cockpit at the nose and amidships, both fitted with pivot-mounted 7.7 mm (0.303 in) machine-guns. Only one Loire 30 was produced in 1932, but it failed to gain an order and was relegated to experimental use.

=== Loire 301 ===
After rejection in its original role, the sole Loire 30 / Loire 300 was modified with a very large windowless drum-shaped turret fitted in the nose and re-designated Loire 301. The purpose of the turret is uncertain; the favored theory of some references is an armored turret housing a large caliber gun; another theory is an airborne blind flying training simulator. To compensate the additional weight of the turret the central engine was moved backwards and inverted to drive a pusher propeller. This led to the unusual propulsion with two tractor and one pusher engines above the wings. Due to the turret resembling a type of copper laundry kettle commonly used at the time, the airplane was nicknamed la lessiveuse.

== Specifications (Loire 30) ==
Data from The Illustrated Encyclopedia of Aircraft, Aviafrance:Loire 30

General characteristics

- Crew: 3
- Length: 13.7 m (44 ft 11 in)
- Wingspan: 22.15 m (72 ft 8 in)
- Height: 4.96 m (16 ft 3 in)
- Wing area: 64 m^{2} (690 sq ft)
- Empty weight: 2,510 kg (5,534 lb)
- Gross weight: 3,760 kg (8,289 lb)
- Powerplant: 3 × Salmson 9Ab 9-cylinder air-cooled radial piston engines, 170 kW (230 hp) each
- Propellers: 2-bladed metal variable-pitch airscrews

Performance

- Maximum speed: 200 km/h (120 mph, 110 kn)

Armament

- Guns: 2 × 7.7 mm (0.303 in) pivot-mounted machine guns

== Bibliography ==
- The Illustrated Encyclopedia of Aircraft (Part Work 1982-1985). Orbis Publishing.
