= Loire 501 =

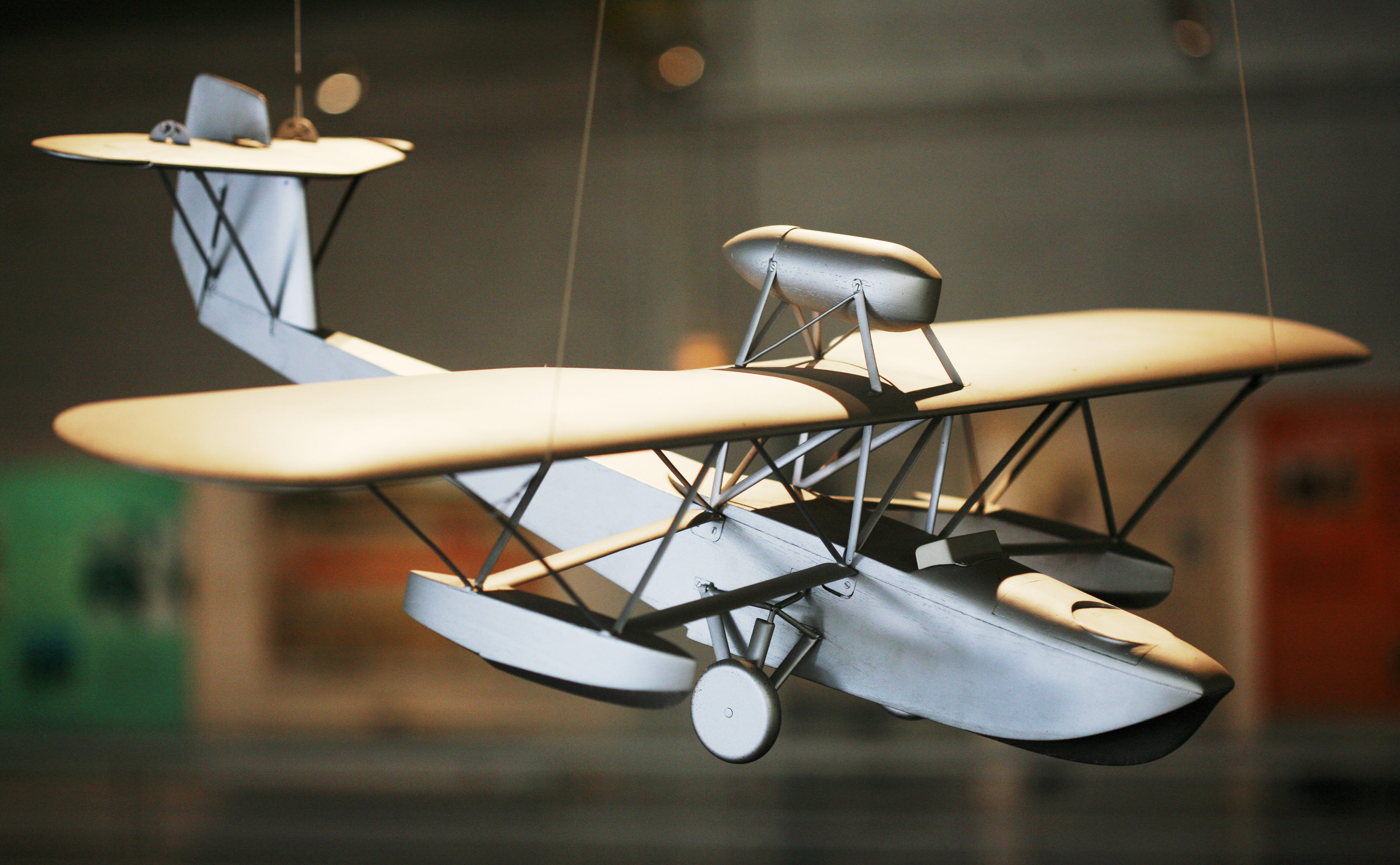
- Wind tunnel model of the Loire 501

General information
- Type: Liaison flying boat
- Manufacturer: Loire
- Primary user: French Navy
- Number built: 7

History
- Introduction date: 1933
- First flight: 7 September 1931
- Retired: 1940

The Loire 501 was a single-engined French liaison and training flying boat of the 1930s produced by Loire Aviation. It was operated by the French Navy, remaining in service until 1940.

== Design and development ==
In 1930, Loire Aviation, a subsidiary of the French shipyard Ateliers et Chantiers de la Loire of Saint-Nazaire, started design of a single-engined flying boat for use as a trainer and a transport in France's overseas possessions. The resultant aircraft, the Loire 50, was an amphibian high-winged monoplane, with a 230 hp (170 kW) pusher Salmson 9AB radial engine mounted above the wing. Construction was all-metal, with fabric-covered wings. The French government ordered construction of a prototype Loire 50 (together with a prototype of the three-engined Loire 60 flying boat) on 31 March 1931.

The Loire 50 first flew on 7 September 1931. Although it was damaged in an accident in October, it was repaired and entered service in 1932 as a trainer. It was returned to Loire in February 1933, where it was modified with a more powerful (350 hp (260 kW) Hispano-Suiza 9Qd engine, becoming the Loire 50bis, flying in this form on 18 October 1933. An order was placed for six aircraft similar to the Loire 50bis, designated Loire 501, delivery starting by the end of 1933. The Loire 501 remained in service at the start of the Second World War, with the last example still in use at Karouba in Tunisia on 15 August 1940.

== Operators ==
France

- French Navy

== Specifications ==
Data from War Planes of the Second World War:Volume Five, Flying Boats

General characteristics

- Crew: 3 to 4
- Length: 11.08 m (36 ft 4 1/4 in)
- Wingspan: 16.00 m (52 ft 6 in)
- Height: 4.47 m (14 ft 8 in)
- Wing area: 39.40 m^{2} (424.1 sq ft)
- Empty weight: 1,385 kg (3,053 lb)
- Gross weight: 2,150 kg (4,740 lb)
- Powerplant: 1 × Hispano-Suiza 9Qd 9-cylinder radial engine

Performance

- Maximum speed: 195 km/h (121 mph, 105 kn) at 1,000 m (3,280 ft)
- Cruise speed: 140 km/h (87 mph, 76 kn)
- Range: 1,099 km (683 mi, 594 nmi)
- Service ceiling: 4,850 m (15,910 ft)
- Time to altitude:
  - 4 min to 1,000 m (3,280 ft)
  - 16 min to 2,890 m (9,480 ft)

== See also ==
Related lists

- List of aircraft of World War II

== Bibliography ==
- Bousquet, Gérard (2013). French Flying Boats of WW II. Sandomierz, Poland: Stratus. ISBN 978-83-63678-06-7.
- Green, William (1968). War Planes of the Second World War: Volume Five, Flying Boats. London: Macdonald. ISBN 0-356-01449-5.
- Leyvastre, Pierre (April 1970). "Un canot-major volant: Loire 501" [A Big Flying Canoe: Loire 501]. Le album de fanatique de l'Aviation (in French). No. 10. pp. 7–9. ISSN 0757-4169.
