= SNCAC NC.4-10 =

NC 4-10
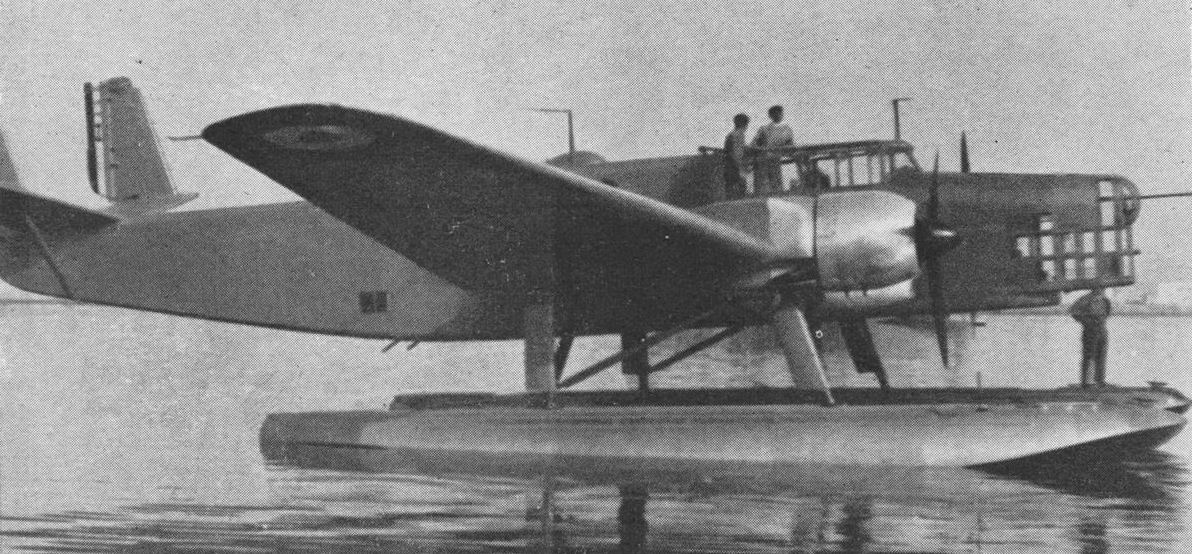

General information
- Type: torpedo bomber floatplane
- National origin: France
- Manufacturer: Farman and Société Nationale de Constructions Aéronautiques du Centre (SNCAC), Boulogne-Billancourt
- Designer: Rocca and Caressa
- Number built: 1

History
- First flight: 10 July 1939; 86 years ago

The SNCAC NC.4-10 was a twin-engine floatplane torpedo bomber built in France in the late 1930s. It was one of several prototypes competing for a Navy specification but no contracts were awarded after the military lost interest in the type.

== Design and development ==
The Farman F.410 was designed in 1934, before the part-nationalisation of the French aircraft industry in 1936-7 brought Farman and Hanriot together as the Société Nationale de Constructions Aéronautiques du Centre (SNCAC). The design anticipated the government specification MT/CPT-9 for a "combat scout seaplane" for the Forces Aériennes de Mer, which was circulated amongst manufacturers in May 1935. Farman revised the F.410 to accommodate this specification and four other French manufacturers also built prototypes to it. There were further changes to MT/CPT-9 in March 1937. Post-nationalisation, the F.410 was renamed the SNCAC NC.4-10.

The twin engine NC.4-10 was an all-metal aircraft. It had low-set wings with a rectangular centre section, tapering outboard of the engines. The fuselage was flat sided and tapered aft to a high set tailplane. This carried inboard twin fins, tall and straight tapered, on top of it. The pilots' cabin was above the wing leading edge and the deep nose was largely glazed. There were three machine gun and one Hispano cannon positions. The two long floats were each mounted on a pair of near vertical faired struts, with further cross bracing.

Originally the F.410 was designed to be powered by two Hispano 12 Ybrs, a V-12 engine then in its early development phase. When the NC.4-10 first flew, piloted by Lucian Coupet on 10 July 1939, it was powered instead by a pair of 890 hp (635 kW) Gnome-Rhône 14Knrs/ors 14-cylinder radials, mounted on the upper wing surface. After a few flights, these proved to be poorly cooled and to be prone to crankshaft failure, so they were replaced with 1050 hp (780 kW) Gnome-Rhône 14 N1/N2 radials.

The NC.4-10 initially flew as a landplane, using a temporary fixed conventional undercarriage. It flew to Marignane on the Côte d'Azur on 22 August 1939, where it was fitted with floats, and made its first take-off on floats from the Étang de Berre on 12 September, flown by Louis Giraud.

Conversely, the Admiralty had changed its mind and chosen to abandon the floatplane in favour of landplanes, ordering the Lioré et Olivier LeO 45. The seaplanes of specification MT/CPT-9 ultimately remained in use for miscellaneous tasks, the NC.4-10 going to St Raphael for tests of speed, service ceiling and range. As World War II developed, the aircraft was moved to avoid the now-encroaching axis forces; on 18 May 1940, the NC.4-10 translated to Biscarrosse on the west coast of France, to escape imminent Italian attacks on the south coast. In mid-June, with German task forces closing in, the aircraft was flown to the Gulf of Bougie in North Africa. Its ultimate fate is not recorded.

== Specifications ==
Data from Les avions Farman p.230

General characteristics

- Crew: 4/5
- Length: 17.70 m (58 ft 1 in)
- Wingspan: 26.80 m (87 ft 11 in)
- Height: 6.80 m (22 ft 4 in)
- Wing area: 89.00 m^{2} (958.0 sq ft)
- Empty weight: 8,170 kg (18,012 lb)
- Gross weight: 11,980 kg (26,411 lb)
- Powerplant: 2 × Gnome-Rhône 14Knrs/ors 14-cylinder, two row radial, 660 kW (890 hp) each

Performance

- Maximum speed: 326 km/h (203 mph, 176 kn)
- Range: 2,000 km (1,200 mi, 1,100 nmi)
- Service ceiling: 5,800 m (19,000 ft)

Armament

- 3× machine gun positions
- 1× Hispano cannon
- 2×torpedoes or 5×225 kg bombs or 3×"heavy projectiles" of 410 kg

== See also ==
Aircraft of comparable role, configuration, and era

- Bloch MB.480
- Loire-Nieuport 10

Related lists

- List of flying boats and floatplanes

== Bibliography ==
- Liron, Jean (1984). Les avions Farman. Collection Docavia. Vol. 21. Paris: Éditions Larivière. OCLC 37146471.
