= Loire 70 =

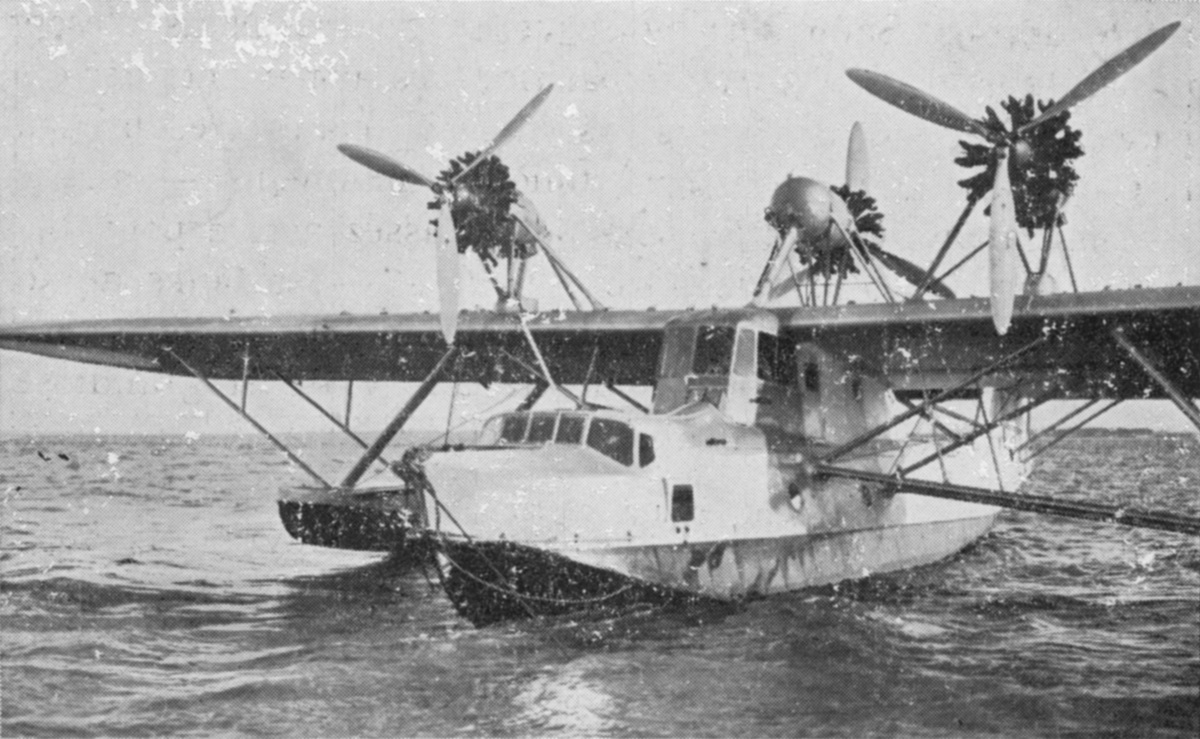
- Seaplane Loire-70

General information
- Type: Long-range maritime reconnaissance flying boat
- Manufacturer: Loire
- Primary user: French Navy
- Number built: 8

History
- Introduction date: 1937
- First flight: 28 December 1933

The Loire 70 was a 1930s French long-range maritime reconnaissance flying boat produced by Loire Aviation.

== Design and development ==
Loire 70

The Loire 70 was designed to meet a 1932 French Navy requirement for a long-range flying boat for maritime reconnaissance and bombing. The prototype first flew on 28 December 1933. It was an all-metal monoplane, with a heavily braced high wing, with three radial engines mounted above the wing, two as tractors and one as a pusher. The original engines, three 500 hp (373 kW) Gnome et Rhône 9Kbr radials, were not powerful enough and were replaced with 740 hp (552 kW) Gnome-Rhône 9Kfr radials. Seven production aircraft were produced.

== Operational history ==
The seven production aircraft and the prototype were all delivered to the French Navy, serving with Escadrille E7 at Karouba in Tunisia. During the early days of World War II, the aircraft carried out patrols in the Mediterranean. In an Italian air raid on their base on 12 June 1940, three of the four surviving aircraft were destroyed. The remaining Loire 70 was one of a number of aircraft that were requested to be scrapped on 4 October 1941.

== Operator ==
France

- French Navy

== Specifications ==
Data from

General characteristics

- Crew: 8
- Length: 19.501 m (63 ft 11 3/4 in)
- Wingspan: 30.001 m (98 ft 5 1/8 in)
- Height: 6.750 m (22 ft 1 3/4 in)
- Wing area: 136.00 m^{2} (1,463.9 sq ft)
- Empty weight: 6,500 kg (14,330 lb)
- Gross weight: 10,500 kg (23,148 lb)
- Max takeoff weight: 11,500 kg (25,353 lb)
- Powerplant: 3 × Gnome-Rhône 9Kfr nine-cylinder radial engines, 550 kW (740 hp) each

Performance

- Maximum speed: 235 km/h (146 mph, 127 kn) at sea level
- Cruise speed: 165.0 km/h (102.5 mph, 89.1 kn)
- Range: 3,001 km (1,865 mi, 1,621 nmi)
- Service ceiling: 4,000 m (13,120 ft)
- Time to altitude:
  - 6 min to 1,000 m (3,280 ft)
  - 26 min 6 sec to 3,000 m (9,840 ft)

Armament

- Guns: Six 7.5mm (0.295 in) Darne machine guns
- Bombs: Four 150 kg (330 lb) bombs

== See also ==
Related lists

- List of aircraft of World War II
- List of Interwar military aircraft

== Bibliography ==
- Bousquet, Gérard (April 1992). "Le Loire 70: Malchanceux jusqu'au bout". Le Fana de l'Aviation (in French). No. 269. pp. 16–30.
- Bousquet, Gérard (May 1992). "Le Loire 70: Le Malchanceux...2e partie". Le Fana de l'Aviation (in French). No. 270. pp. 50–55.
- Bousquet, Gérard (2013). French Flying Boats of WW II. Sandomierz, Poland: Stratus. ISBN 978-83-63678-06-7.
- The Illustrated Encyclopedia of Aircraft (Part Work 1982-1985). Orbis Publishing.
