= Loire 11 =

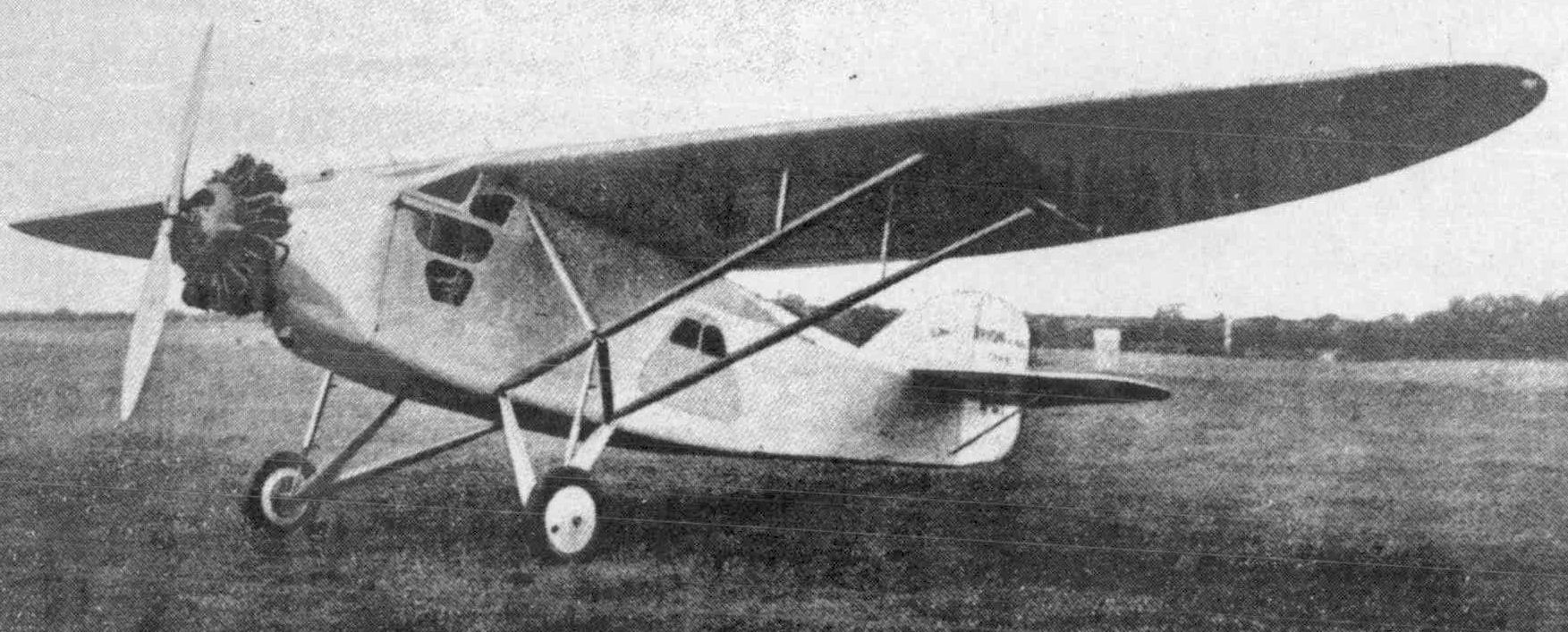

General information
- Type: Three-seat general-purpose monoplane
- National origin: France
- Manufacturer: Loire
- Built by: Loire Aviation
- Number built: 2

History
- First flight: 1930

The Loire 11 was a French three-seat general purpose monoplane designed and built by Loire Aviation of St. Nazaire. It was the first original design by the company.

It was designed to fulfil a requirement for a general purpose transport for operation throughout France’s overseas colonies. It was a strut-braced high-wing monoplane that seated up to three occupants and was powered by a single 300 hp (224 kW) Lorraine Algol radial engine. During 1930, a pair of prototypes were completed. However, the project was abandoned one year later after the type failed to garner interest from the French government.

== Design and development ==
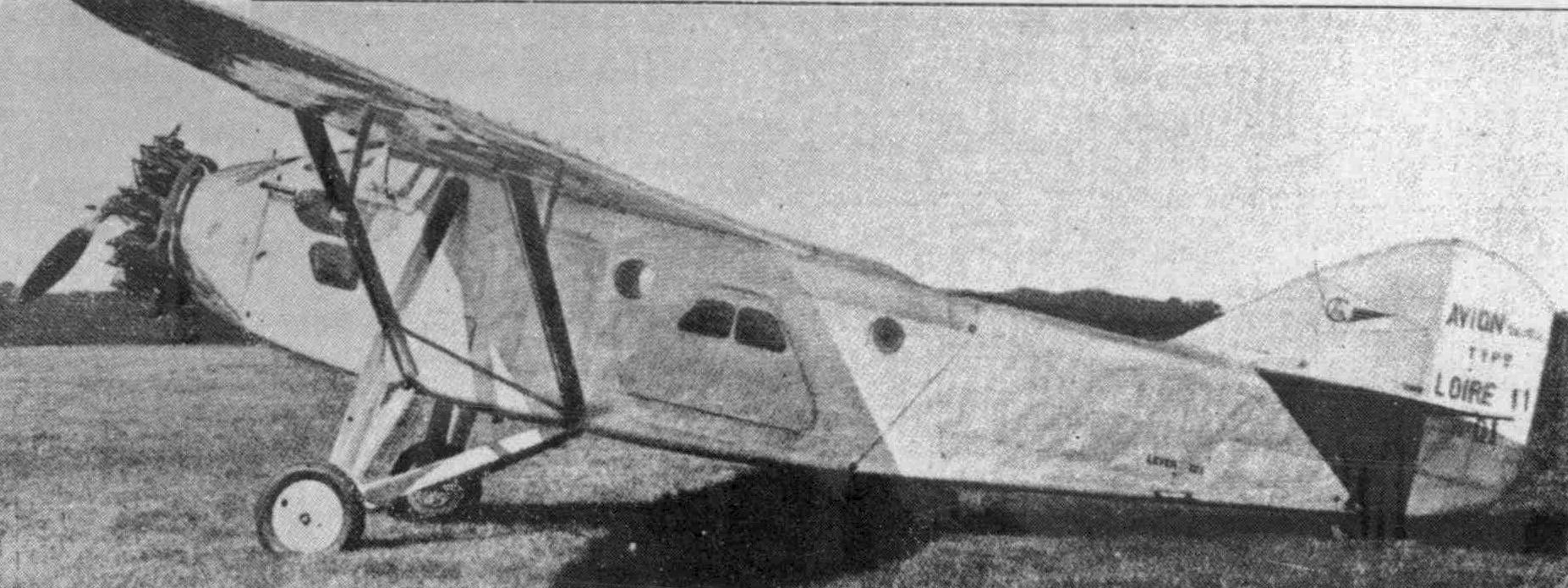
Loire 11 left side view

During the early 1930s, the French aircraft manufacturer Loire Aviation opted to increase the scope of its activities, establishing new workshop facilities and embarking on the construction of new aircraft. One of these new aircraft designs became known as the Loire 11; it featured a then-innovative technique relating to its metal constriction along with other original solutions. Extensive use of duralumin was made throughout its construction in various forms, including sheets, strips, open channels, as well as limited used for special shaped components such as flanges, tubing. Some of the fittings were made of steel. Several components, including the rudder pedals, supports, and shims were cast; there was no use of autogenously welded parts.

In terms of its basic configuration, the wing of the Loire 11 was elliptical with a slight dihedral. It was outfitted with a pair of differentially controlled conventional ailerons along with a pair of auxiliary ailerons that facilitated landings on rough terrain. Each half of the wing was attached to the fuselage at the uppermost part of the cabin. It lacked any conventional ribs while the covering was attached either to strips or longerons.

The structure of this wing heavily relied upon a series of L-shaped girders, the ribs being set between them at an angle of 60 degrees. The profile of these ribs corresponded to oblique sections of the wing that supported the covering by means of strips; this construction technique was subject to a patent. Principal advantages of this structure included the compression members (which ran along the entire height of the profile and were connected to the strips) functioned to brace the wing without the possibility of buckling or deforming, relatively light-weight cross bracing while achieving a high level of torsional rigidity, and the covering being attachable to the wing after the mounting of the latter without concern for deformation during the riveting process. The ribs were joined together and to the spars via a large number of standardised gussets, all joints were alike. The use of plate-style girders were intentionally avoided in favour of plain sheet metal that was lightened by round triangular holes with crimped edges wherever practical to do so, such as the spar webs and ribs, while minimising the amount of riveting.

The structure of the fuselage was based on identical principles as that of the wing. It consisted of a pair of vertical girders that were braced by a series of transverse frames which were in turn riveted to gussets. The external covering, which was composed of sheet duralumin, played a key role in transferring and managing stresses across the airframe; it was attached to the girders via several longitudinal longerons. The fuselage, the forward section of which supported the engine bearer, was divided into two sections that were assembled via four ball-and-socket joints along the oblique planes of two transverse members. The divided-axle landing gear was outfitted with Messier-supplied shock absorbers; each axle was carried by a pair of lower struts that formed a sturdy box at their junction. The wheels were equipped with brakes while the tail skid was also outfitted with its own shock absorber.

Early on, it was intended for the aircraft to be powered by a single Salrnson 9b radial engine, capable of generating up to 250hp. However, following an increase in the equipment fitout and the corresponding greater overall weight midway through development (the aircraft’s total weight increased from 1,720 kg (3,792 lb.) to 1,920 kg (4,233 lb.)), it was deemed to be necessary to adopt a more powerful engine in the form of the Lorraine Algol radial, which was capable of producing up to 300 hp. This engine, which drove a metal propeller, was secured to a sheet-metal engine bearer that was in turn attached to the fuselage via four bolts. To reduce the risks posed by a fire, the engine bay incorporated a fire extinguisher; the engine cowling also protected the more delicate elements, such as the distribution system, from sand and debris.

The equipment fitout, while considered to be rather complicated at the time, was broadly similar to that of existing three-seat aircraft used for colonial purposes. Roles intended for the type, according to the manufacturer, included liaison, aerial observation, light ground attack, and air ambulance duties. The cockpit was furnished with disconnectable dual flight controls; a glass roof which can be opened mid-flight (permitting emergency egress via parachute. Aft of the cockpit was the cabin, it had sufficient space to accommodate a single stretcher-bound casualty along with a seated attendant. Suitable equipment was provisioned to satisfy night flight requirements, including navigation and position lights, landing lights, and Michelin-supplied flares. In terms of armament, it had a pair of machine guns mounted on Scarff rings directly above the cabin as well as a box of 30 hand grenades, it also had up to 12 signalling rockets onboard. The airplane was also equipped with two-way radio set along with an emergency generator.

== Specifications ==
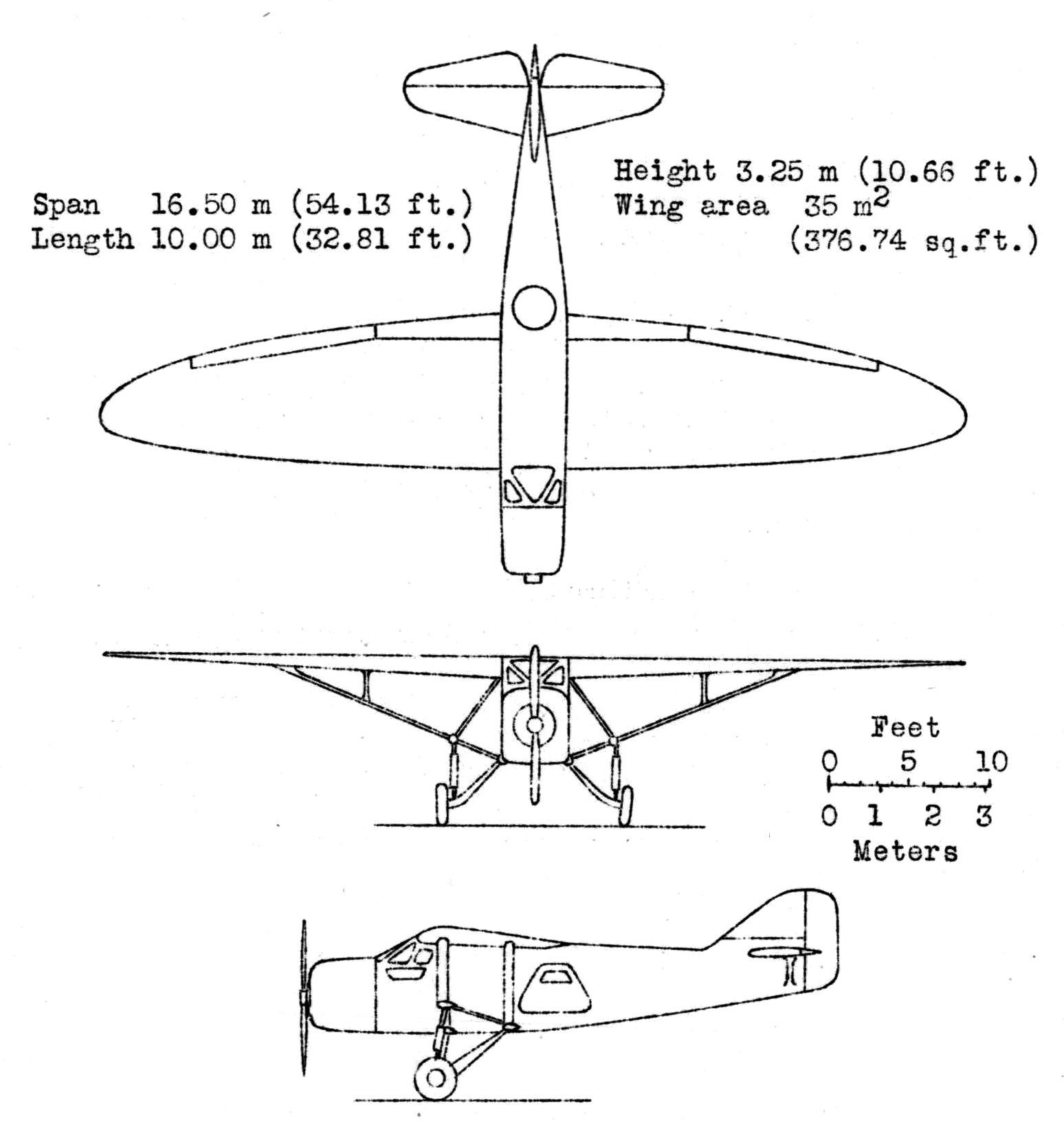
Loire 11 3-view drawing from NACA aircraft Circular No.157

Data from National Advisory Committee for Aeronautics

General characteristics

- Length: 10 m (32 ft 10 in)
- Wingspan: 16.5 m (54 ft 2 in)
- Height: 3.25 m (10 ft 8 in)
- Empty weight: 1,120 kg (2,469 lb)
- Gross weight: 1,920 kg (4,233 lb)
- Powerplant: 1 × Lorraine Algol , 220 kW (300 hp)

Performance

- Maximum speed: 201 km/h (125 mph, 109 kn)
- Range: 600 km (370 mi, 320 nmi)
