= SNCAO 30 =

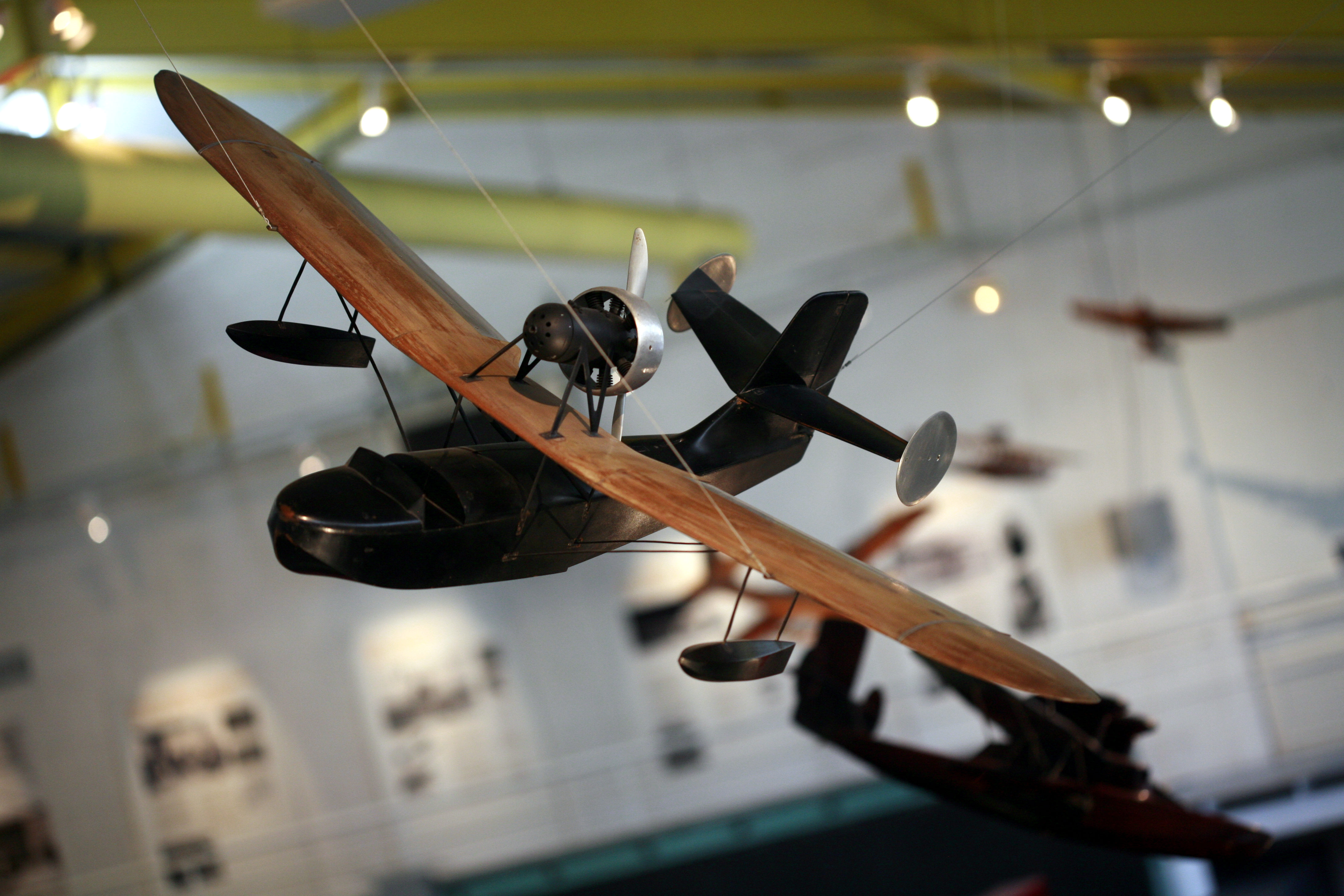
- Wind-tunnel model of the SNCAO 30

General information
- Type: Training flying-boat
- National origin: France
- Manufacturer: SNCAO
- Status: Prototype only
- Number built: 2

History
- First flight: 13 September 1938

The SNCAO 30 was a French single-engined monoplane flying boat two-seat trainer. Although it was ordered into production for the French Navy, only two prototypes were built.

== Development and design ==
In the late 1930s Loire-Nieuport commenced development of the Loire-Nieuport LN-30 as a private venture to meet a requirement of the French Navy for a two-seat flying boat trainer. The resultant design, which was renamed SNCAO 30 when Loire-Nieuport was nationalised and became part of Société nationale des constructions aéronautiques de l'ouest (SNCAO), was a single-engined pusher monoplane of wooden construction, with the crew of two sitting side-by side in an open cockpit. Its wing was carried on struts above the fuselage, with the Salmson 9ABa radial engine mounted above the wing.

The first prototype, built at the SNCAO factory at Saint Nazaire, made its maiden flight on 13 September 1938, these resulting in a number of modifications, including adding dihedral to the outer wing panels, placing a cowling around the engine and replacing its twin tail with a single large fin, the prototype flying again in this form on 21 September 1938, with a second prototype flying on 19 May 1939. The aircraft was disappointing, however, being nose-heavy and with its engine suffering from severe vibration and overheating.

Despite these problems, as there was no better alternative, an order for production of 12 aircraft, designated SNCAO 300, was placed on 19 March 1940. Production was ended by the Nazi German invasion of France, with no production aircraft being completed.

== Specifications ==
Data from War Planes of the Second World War: Volume Five Flying Boats

General characteristics

- Crew: 2
- Length: 9.20 m (30 ft 2 1/4 in)
- Wingspan: 13.00 m (42 ft 7 3/4 in)
- Height: 3.21 m (10 ft 6 1/3 in)
- Wing area: 26.50 m^{2} (285.2 sq ft)
- Empty weight: 1,375 kg (3,031 lb)
- Gross weight: 1,790 kg (3,946 lb)
- Powerplant: 1 × Salmson 9ABa nine-cylinder radial engine, 210 kW (280 hp)

Performance

- Maximum speed: 192 km/h (119 mph, 103 kn) at sea level
- Stall speed: 101 km/h (63 mph, 55 kn)
- Endurance: 4 hr
- Service ceiling: 4,000 m (13,120 ft)
- Time to altitude: 22 min to 3,000 m (9,840 ft)

== See also ==
Aircraft of comparable role, configuration, and era

- Loire 130

Related lists

- List of flying boats and floatplanes
