= Loire 250 =

French 1935 prototype fighter plane

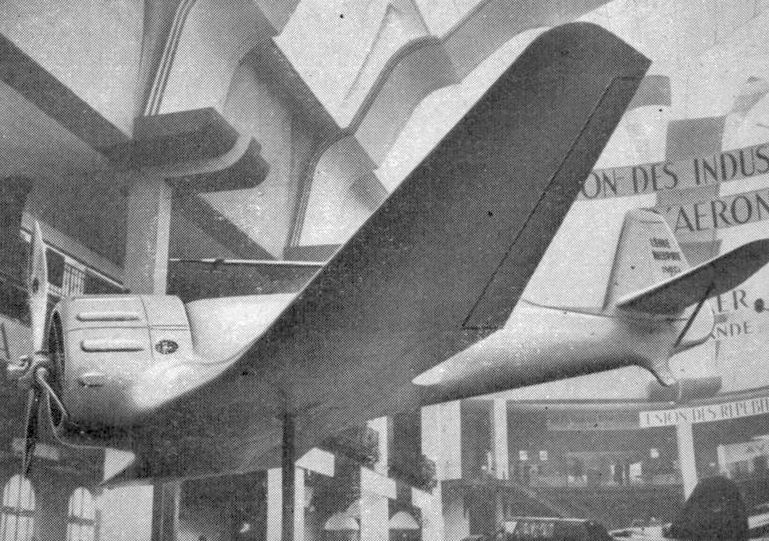

General information
- Type: Single-seat fighter monoplane
- National origin: France
- Manufacturer: Loire
- Number built: 1

History
- First flight: 27 September 1935

The Loire 250 was a French single-seat fighter monoplane designed and built by Loire Aviation of St. Nazaire.

== Design and development ==
The Loire 250 was built to meet a requirement for a single-seat fighter prototype to undergo a fly-off competition with the Dewoitine D.513 and Morane-Saulnier MS.405. The Loire 250 was an all-metal low-wing monoplane powered by a 1,000 hp (746 kW) Hispano-Suiza 14Ha-7a radial engine with a single enclosed cockpit and retractable conventional landing gear with a tailwheel. Only one prototype was produced; it first flew 27 September 1935. It was modified to improve performance before the fly-off but failed to gain a production order. The prototype was unarmed but it was intended to fit two 20 mm cannon and two 7.5 mm machine-guns if the type entered production.

== Specifications ==
Data from Aviafrance:Loire 250

General characteristics

- Crew: 1
- Length: 7.81 m (25 ft 7 in)
- Wingspan: 10.8 m (35 ft 5 in)
- Height: 3.72 m (12 ft 2 in)
- Wing area: 16.3 m^{2} (175 sq ft)
- Empty weight: 1,500 kg (3,307 lb)
- Gross weight: 2,200 kg (4,850 lb)
- Powerplant: 1 × Hispano-Suiza 14Ha 14-cylinder two-row air-cooled radial piston engine, 750 kW (1,000 hp)
- Propellers: 2-bladed wooden fixed-pitch propeller

Performance

- Maximum speed: 480 km/h (300 mph, 260 kn) at 4,500 m (14,800 ft)
- Range: 875 km (544 mi, 472 nmi)
- Time to altitude: 4,500 m (14,800 ft) in 5 minutes 30 seconds

Armament

- Guns: not fitted to prototype

2 × 20 mm (0.8 in) cannon and 2 × 7.5 mm (0.30 in) machine-guns proposed for production aircraft

== Bibliography ==
- Bousquet, Gerard (August 2023). "Un destin contrarié: L'avion de chasse Loire 250 C1" [A Contrary Destiny: The Loire 250 Single-seat Fighter]. Le Fana de l'Aviation (in French) (645): 32–40. ISSN 0757-4169.
- The Illustrated Encyclopedia of Aircraft (Part Work 1982-1985). Orbis Publishing.
