= Loire 102 =

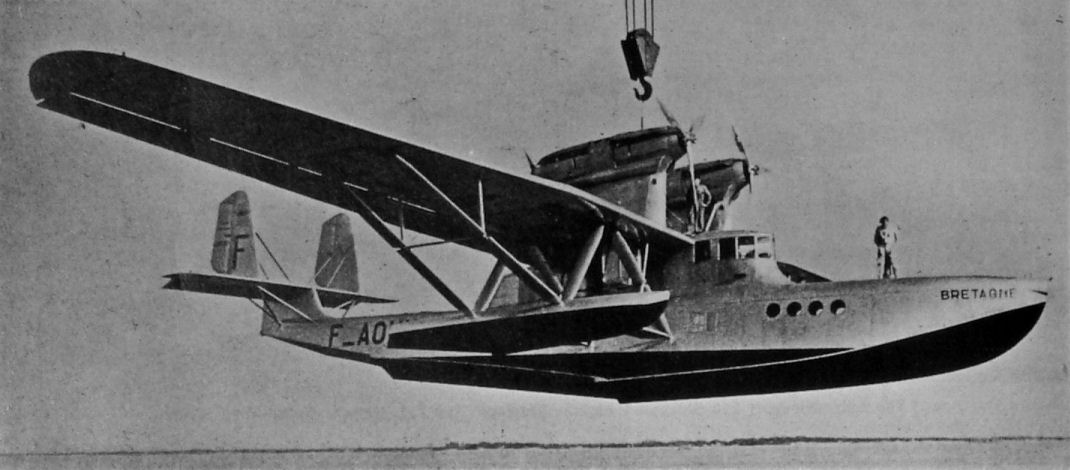

General information
- Type: Mail plane flying boat
- Manufacturer: Loire

History
- Manufactured: 1
- First flight: 12 May 1936
- Retired: 1938

The Loire 102 was a 1930s French flying boat designed as a mail plane by Loire Aviation.

== Development ==
The Loire 102 was designed to operate as a mailplane on the South Atlantic route between West Africa and Brazil. The prototype (registered F-AOVV and named Bretagne) first flew on 12 May 1936. It was a flying boat with a two step hull on top was a superstructure with a control cabin and crew compartments. In the forward hull was a cabin for four passengers, and to the rear were holds for mail, baggage and other cargo. It had a high braced wing on top of the wing was four Hispano-Suiza 12Xirs in tandem pairs (in tractor/pusher configuration). It originally had twin vertical tail surfaces but these were replaced with a single large fin and rudder. The aircraft had severe vibration problems which could not be fixed and Bretagne was scrapped in 1938 without going into service.

== Specifications ==
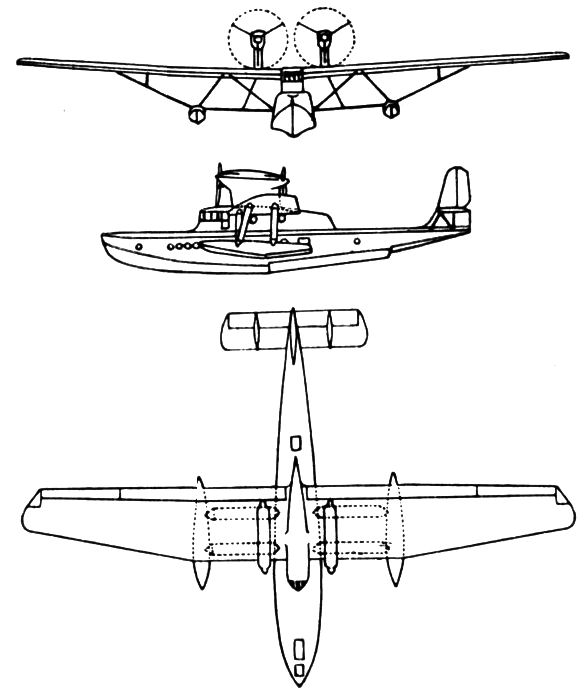
Loire 102 3-view drawing from L'Aerophile July 1936

Data from Grey 1972, p. 104c

General characteristics

- Crew: 4
- Capacity: 4 passengers and cargo
- Length: 23 m (75 ft 6 in)
- Wingspan: 34 m (111 ft 7 in)
- Height: 6.95 m (22 ft 10 in)
- Wing area: 125 m^{2} (1,350 sq ft) the struts provided another 12 m^{2} of lifting surface
- Empty weight: 9,600 kg (21,164 lb)
- Gross weight: 18,100 kg (39,904 lb) normal loaded
- Max takeoff weight: 18,500 kg (40,786 lb)
- Powerplant: 4 × Hispano-Suiza 12Xirs water-cooled V12 engine, 540 kW (720 hp) each

Performance

- Maximum speed: 310 km/h (190 mph, 170 kn) at 3,000 m (9,845 ft)
- Cruise speed: 250 km/h (160 mph, 130 kn) at 4,000 m (13,120 ft) and 55% power
- Service ceiling: 6,000 m (20,000 ft)
- Wing loading: 135 kg/m^{2} (28 lb/sq ft)

== See also ==
Related lists

- List of flying boats and floatplanes

== Bibliography ==
- Bousquet, Gérard (2013). French Flying Boats of WW II. Sandomierz, Poland: Stratus. ISBN 978-83-63678-06-7.
- Grey, C.G. (1972). Jane's All the World's Aircraft 1938. London: David & Charles. ISBN 0-7153-5734-4.
- Taylor, Michael J. H. (1989). Jane's Encyclopedia of Aviation. London: Studio Editions.
- The Illustrated Encyclopedia of Aircraft (Part Work 1982–1985). Orbis Publishing. p. 2378.
