= No. 320 (Netherlands) Squadron RAF =

Defunct flying squadron of the Royal Air Force

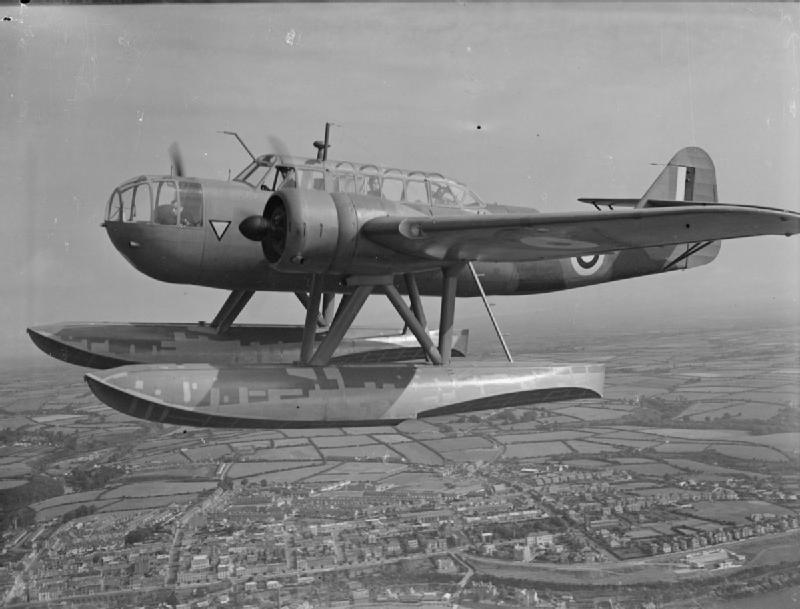
- A Fokker T.VIII of No. 320 Squadron begins a patrol after taking off from Pembroke Dock, Wales
- Active: 1 June 1940 – 2 August 1945
- Country: United Kingdom
- Allegiance: (Netherlands) Dutch government in exile
- Branch: Royal Air Force
- Type: Inactive
- Part of: RAF Coastal Command; RAF Bomber Command; RAF Second Tactical Air Force
- Nickname: Netherlands
- Mottos: Latin: Animo libre dirigimur ("We are guided by the mind of liberty"); Dutch: ("Wij worden geleid door een vrije geest")

Insignia
- Squadron Badge: In front of a fountain an orange tree fracted and eradicated. The orange tree refers to the squadron's connection with the Netherlands and the fountain to its operations over the sea.
- Squadron Codes: SP (allocated June 1939 – Sep 1939); TD (Jun 1940 – Oct 1940); NO (Oct 1940 – Aug 1945)

No. 320 (Netherlands) Squadron RAF was a unit of the Royal Air Force during World War II formed from the personnel of the Royal Netherlands Naval Air Service.

== History ==
=== Formation ===
Formed on 1 June 1940 at RAF Pembroke Dock, after flying from the Netherlands in eight Fokker T.VIIIW twin-engined patrol seaplanes, as part of Coastal Command. The squadron flew coastal and anti-submarine patrols in the Fokkers until they became unserviceable due to lack of spares and were re-equipped with Ansons in August 1940 and supplemented in October with Hudsons. Due to insufficient personnel, the squadron absorbed No. 321 (Netherlands) Squadron on 18 January 1941.

=== To Bomber Command ===
The squadron moved to RAF Leuchars on 1 October 1941, re-equipped with Hudson IIIs, flying patrols and anti-shipping attacks in the North Sea. Detachments were located at RAF Silloth and RAF Carew Cheriton until 24 April 1942 when the squadron moved to RAF Bircham Newton. The squadron was reassigned to Bomber Command and loaned to No.2 Group on 15 March 1943. The squadron was re-equipped with Mitchells during spring 1943 and moved to RAF Methwold.

=== In the 2nd Tactical Air Force ===
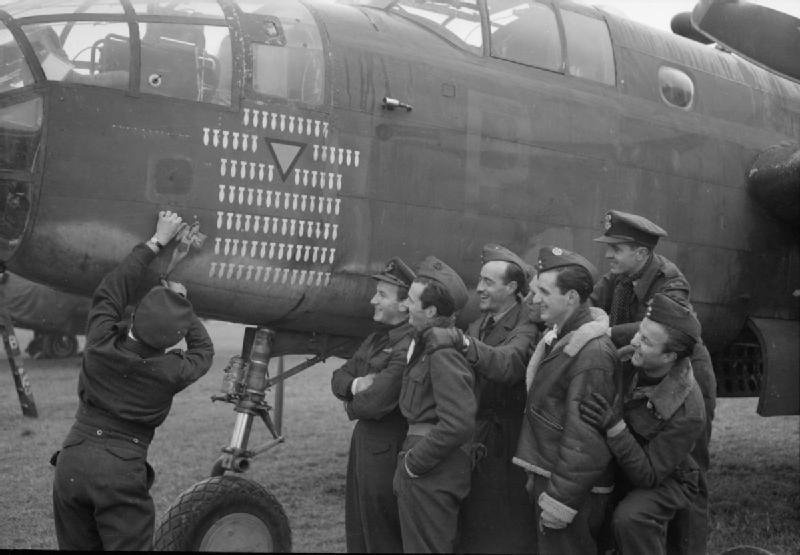
Belgian aircrew of a 320 Squadron Mitchell bomber at B58/Melsbroek, Belgium

On 30 March 1943, the squadron moved to RAF Attlebridge, then was reassigned to Second Tactical Air Force on 1 June with the squadron attacking enemy communications targets and airfields. The squadron relocated to RAF Lasham on 30 August and to RAF Dunsfold on 18 February 1944. From these airfields the squadron participated in many "Ramrod" and "Noball" operations and bombing attacks on construction works, railway yards, fuel dumps and V-1 flying bomb sites in the North of France, in advance of Normandy landings on 6 June 1944 (D-Day).

After D-Day the bombing of tactical targets continued and changed from France to the Dutch coast of Zeeland, and in September 1944 the squadron was involved in bombing German troops in the surroundings of Arnhem during Operation Market Garden, the attempt by airborne troops to take the bridge. In September the squadron started bombing targets in Germany along the Rhine for the advancing allied troops. In October 1944 the squadron was transferred to Melsbroek (B.58), in Belgium. From there the bombing of bridges and airfields in the east of the Netherlands and Germany continued. During 1943 and 1944 the squadron took heavy losses. On 30 April 1945 the squadron moved to Advanced Landing Ground B.110 at Achmer, Lower Saxony in Germany.

=== Back home ===
The squadron was passed to the control of the Dutch Naval Aviation Service (Marine Luchtvaart Dienst) on 2 August 1945, keeping the same squadron number No. 320 Squadron MLD. The squadron was disbanded in 2005, due to budget cuts.

== Aircraft operated ==
Aircraft operated by 320 Squadron
From	To	Aircraft	Version
Jun 1940	Oct 1940	Fokker T.VIII	TVIIIW/G
Aug 1940	Jul 1941	Avro Anson	Mk.I
Oct 1940	Oct 1942	Lockheed Hudson	Mk.I
Mar 1941	Sep 1941	Lockheed Hudson	Mk.II
Jul 1941	Sep 1942	Lockheed Hudson	Mk.III
Jan 1942	May 1942	Lockheed Hudson	Mk.V
Aug 1942	Mar 1943	Lockheed Hudson	Mk.VI
Mar 1943	Aug 1945	North American Mitchell	Mk.II
Feb 1945	Aug 1945	North American Mitchell	Mk.III

== Commanding officers ==
Commanding officers
From	To	Name
July 1940	June 1941	Wing Cdr. J.M. van Olm
June 1941	June 1942	Wing Cdr. J.M. van Olm
June 1942	Sept. 1943	Wing Cdr. K.J.A. Meester
Sept. 1943	Oct. 1943	Wing Cdr. E. Bakker
Oct. 1943	Dec. 1943	Sqn. Ldr. J.F. Breedveld
Dec. 1943	June 1944	Wing Cdr. H.V.B. Burgerhout
June 1944	Sept. 1944	Sqn. Ldr. J.N. Mulder
Sept. 1944	Dec. 1944	Wing Cdr. H.V.B. Burgerhout
Dec. 1944	April 1946	Wing Cdr. A.W. Witholt
