= SNCAO =

French aircraft manufacturer

Société nationale des constructions aéronautiques de l'ouest
- Industry: Aerospace, defence
- Predecessor: Breguet (Bouguenais); Loire (St Nazaire); Nieuport (Issy-les-Moulineaux)
- Founded: 1936
- Defunct: 1941
- Fate: Acquired (nationalization)
- Successor: SNCASO (merged)
- Headquarters: France
- Products: Aircraft

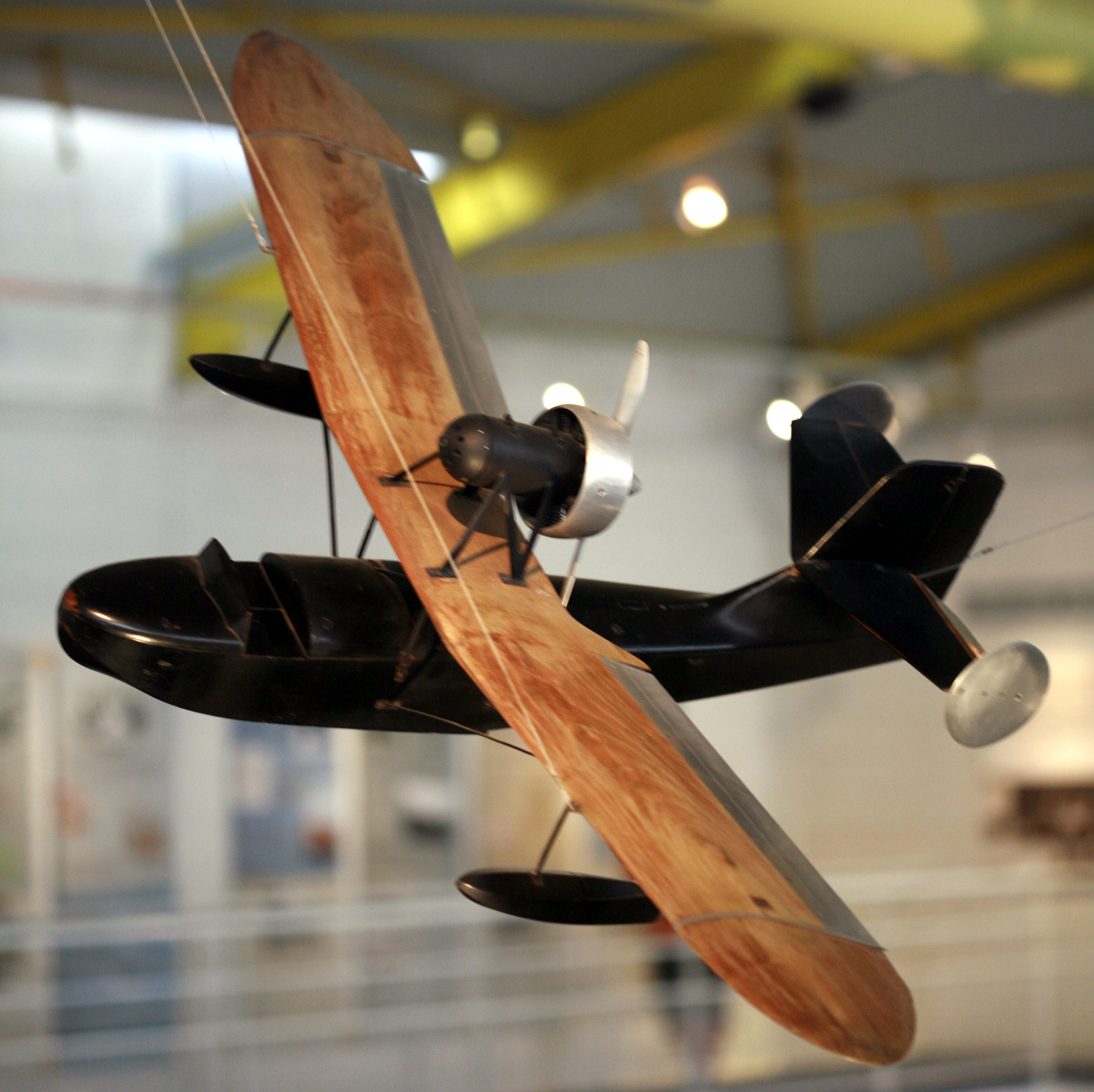
Wind model of the CAO-30

SNCAO (abbreviated from Société nationale des constructions aéronautiques de l'ouest) was a state-owned French aircraft manufacturer, which originated on November 16, 1936, from the merger of the factories of Breguet in Bouguenais, and Loire-Nieuport in St Nazaire and Issy-les-Moulineaux.

The company had been formed as one of six state-owned Société Nationales in the 1936 nationalistation of military industries; at the end of 1940 these were re-organised and SNCAO was absorbed by SNCASO. In 1957 SNCASO was merged into Sud Aviation.

== Aircraft ==
- SNCAO 30
- SNCAO 200
- SNCAO CAO.600
- SNCAO CAO.700
