= Loire 60 =

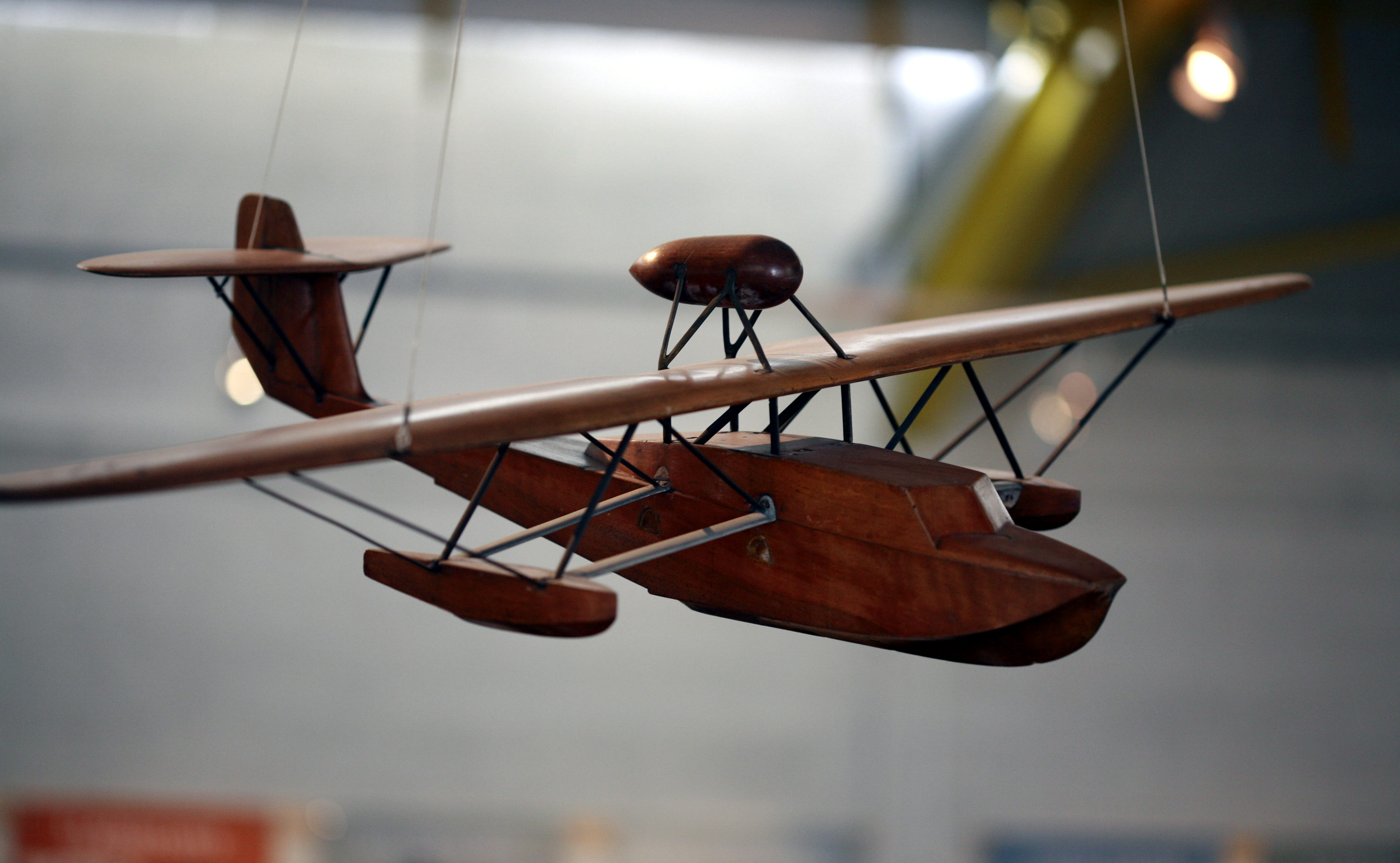
- Wind tunnel model of the Loire 60

General information
- Type: Long-range maritime reconnaissance flying boat
- Manufacturer: Loire
- Primary user: French Navy
- Number built: 1

History
- First flight: 1932

The Loire 60 was a 1930s French prototype for a long-range maritime reconnaissance flying boat produced by Loire Aviation.

It was a trimotor training seaplane for reconnaissance, derived from the Loire 50. A single prototype was built and tested, but it never entered production.

== Specifications ==
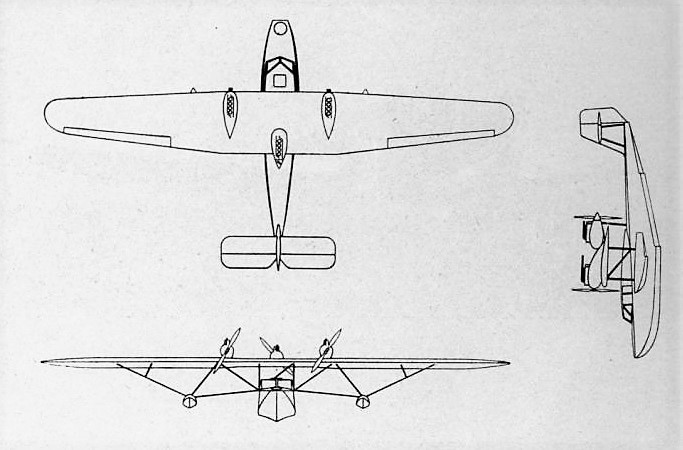
Loire 60 3-view drawing from Annuaire de L'Aéronautique 1931

General characteristics

- Crew: Eight
- Length: 10.80 m (35 ft 5 in)
- Wingspan: 19.70 m (64 ft 8 in)
- Height: 3.30 m (10 ft 10 in)
- Gross weight: 2,032 kg (4,480 lb)
- Powerplant: 3 × Renault 4 Ph , 71 kW (95 hp) each

Performance

- Maximum speed: 165 km/h (103 mph, 89 kn)
- Service ceiling: 3,000 m (9,800 ft)
