= Fokker T.IV =

Dutch torpedo bomber floatplane

T.IV
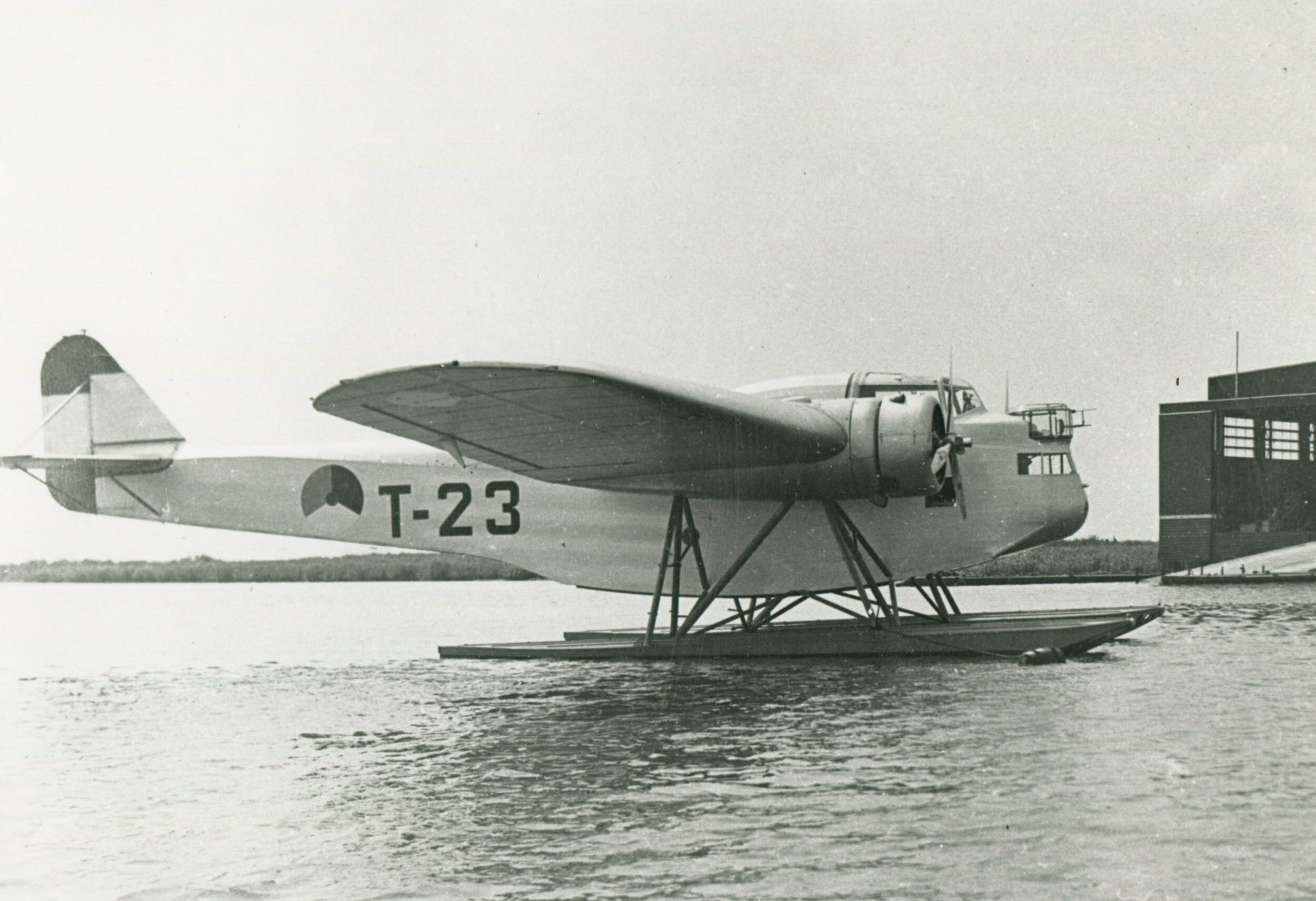

General information
- Type: Maritime patrol floatplane
- Manufacturer: Fokker
- Primary users: Netherlands Portugal
- Number built: 33

History
- First flight: 7 June 1927
- Retired: 1942

The Fokker T.IV was a Dutch torpedo bomber/maritime reconnaissance floatplane of the 1920s and 1930s. First flying in 1927, it served with the Dutch Naval Aviation Service in the Dutch East Indies until the remaining aircraft were destroyed during the Japanese invasion in 1942.

== Development and design ==
The Fokker T.IV was developed to meet the requirements of the Royal Netherlands Navy for a maritime patrol/torpedo bomber aircraft for use in the Dutch East Indies. First flying on June 7, 1927, the T.IV was a twin engined floatplane with a thick, cantilever, high mounted monoplane wing and a deep, slab-sided fuselage with an open cockpit housing the two-man crew. The aircraft could carry either a torpedo or 800 kg (1,764 lb) of bombs, and had a defensive armament of three machine guns in nose, dorsal and ventral positions, The initial version was powered by two 450 hp (340 kW) Lorraine-Dietrich 12E W-12 engines.

In 1935, Fokker produced a developed version, the T-IVa, to supplement the existing T-IVs in Dutch service. Wright Cyclone radial engines replaced the Lorraine Dietriches, while the pilots were provided with an enclosed cockpit in a hump over the wing root, and enclosed nose and dorsal gun turrets were fitted. 12 were built for the Dutch Naval Aviation Service, while the remaining T-IVs were rebuilt to the T-IVa standard.

== Operational history ==
Deliveries of the original T.IV to the Dutch Naval Aviation Service in the Dutch East Indies started in 1927 and continued until 1930. The second batch of 12 TIVa aircraft was delivered to the East Indies from 1936 to 1938, and the original T.IVs were rebuilt as T.IVas.

The T.IV proved to be a reliable and seaworthy aircraft, and continued in use for local patrols and air-sea rescue operations from the naval base at Soerabaja on Java until 1942, when the Japanese attacked the Dutch East Indies. All the remaining T.IVs were destroyed during the Japanese invasion, either by Japanese bombing or scuttling.

== Variants ==
T.IV
Original production version, powered by 336 kW (450 hp) Lorraine-Dietrich 12E engines. 18 built.
T.IVa
Refined version with Wright SR-1820-F2 Cyclone radial engines, enclosed cockpit and gun turrets. 12 built.

== Operators ==
Netherlands

- Dutch Naval Aviation Service

Portugal

- Portuguese Naval Aviation - Portugal received three T.IVs, powered by Rolls-Royce Eagle engines.

== Specifications (T.IVa) ==
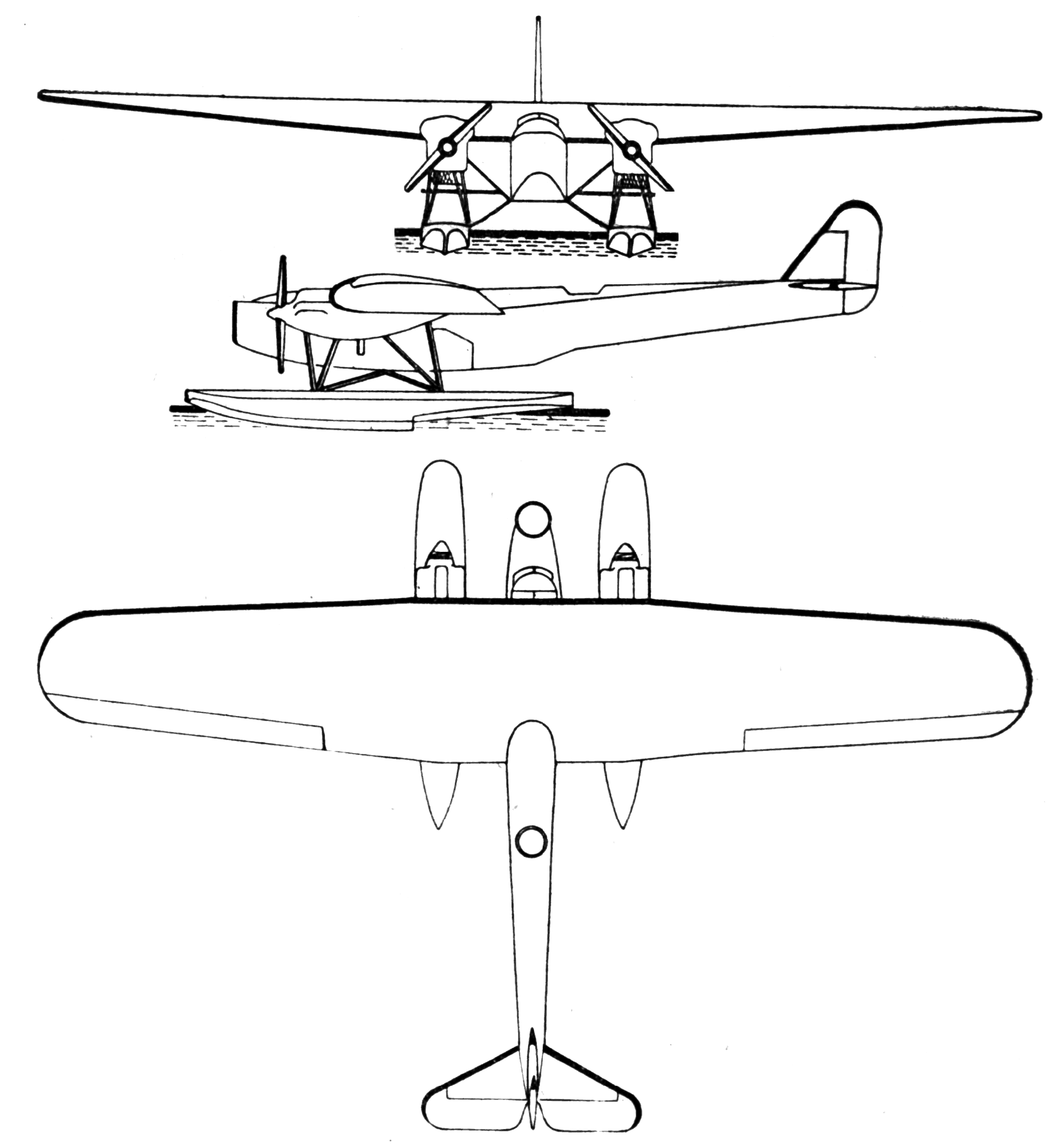
Fokker T.IV 3-view drawing from Les Ailes January 19, 1928

Data from The Encyclopedia of World Aircraft, Jane's all the World's Aircraft 1931

General characteristics

- Crew: 4
- Length: 17.6 m (57 ft 9 in)
- Wingspan: 26.2 m (85 ft 11 in)
- Height: 6 m (19 ft 8 in)
- Wing area: 97.8 m^{2} (1,053 sq ft)
- Empty weight: 4,665 kg (10,285 lb)
- Max takeoff weight: 7,200 kg (15,873 lb)
- Fuel capacity: 1,500 L (400 US gal; 330 imp gal) in several wing tanks and 2x 30 L (7.9 US gal; 6.6 imp gal) oil tanks in the engine nacelles.
- Powerplant: 2 × Wright SR-1820-F2 Cyclone 9-cylinder air-cooled radial piston engines, 560 kW (750 hp) each or 2 x 340 kW (450 hp) Lorraine 12Eb W-12 engines
- Propellers: 2-bladed fixed-pitch propellers

Performance

- Maximum speed: 260 km/h (160 mph, 140 kn)
- Cruise speed: 215 km/h (134 mph, 116 kn)
- Range: 1,560 km (970 mi, 840 nmi)
- Service ceiling: 5,900 m (19,400 ft)
- Wing loading: 73.6 kg/m^{2} (15.1 lb/sq ft)
- Power/mass: 0.160 kW/kg (0.097 hp/lb)

Armament

- Guns: 3 × 7.9 mm (.31 in) Browning machine gun one each in nose and dorsal turrets and ventral position
- Bombs: Up to 800 kg (1,764 lb) bombs internally or 1 × torpedo externally.

== See also ==
Related lists

- List of aircraft of World War II
- List of flying boats and floatplanes
