= Bloch MB.480 =

French floatplane

MB.480

General information
- Type: Torpedo-bomber/reconnaissance floatplane
- National origin: France
- Manufacturer: Société des Avions Marcel Bloch
- Number built: 2

History
- First flight: June 1939

The Bloch MB.480 was a French twin-engined torpedo-bomber/reconnaissance floatplane designed just before the start of the Second World War by Société des Avions Marcel Bloch. Only two were built, the French Navy deciding to use landplanes instead.

== Design and development ==
In May 1937, the French Air Ministry placed an order with Société des Avions Marcel Bloch for two prototype floatplanes intended to fulfill a French Navy requirement for a twin-engined torpedo-bomber/reconnaissance floatplane. Bloch's design, the Bloch MB.480 was a low-winged monoplane that closely resembled the earlier Bloch MB.131 reconnaissance/bomber landplane. It was powered by two 1,060 hp (791 kW) Gnome-Rhône 14N radial engines and carried a crew of five. Defensive armament was a 7.5 mm Darne machine gun in the nose and a ventral bath, while a 20 mm cannon was fitted in a powered dorsal mounting. A heavy load of bombs, torpedoes or auxiliary fuel tanks could be carried in an internal bomb bay.

The first prototype made its maiden flight from Étang de Berre in June 1939. The aircraft's twin tail was raised to avoid spray on take-off and landing, and the tail fins were cropped to restore a good field of fire for the dorsal cannon after the tail assembly had been raised. The second prototype flew in October 1939.

== Operational history ==
Although testing was relatively successful, the French Navy had meanwhile decided that the torpedo-bomber reconnaissance role could be better met by landplanes, with the much faster Lioré et Olivier LeO 451, already on order as a medium bomber for the French Air Force, being chosen. On 9 September 1939, Bloch was told to suspend development trials, while on 10 December it was officially announced that no orders would be placed for either the MB.480 or its two competitors, the SNCAC NC-410 and the Loire-Nieuport 10.

The first prototype was destroyed after colliding with a pier on Étang de Thau on 23 June 1940, while the second prototype was placed into storage in July, and was not flown again.

== Specifications ==
Data from War Planes of the Second World War:Volume Six Floatplanes

General characteristics

- Crew: 5
- Length: 19.1 m (62 ft 8 in)
- Wingspan: 23.50 m (77 ft 1 in)
- Height: 4.6 m (15 ft 1 in)
- Wing area: 82.20 m^{2} (884.8 sq ft)
- Empty weight: 7,020 kg (15,476 lb)
- Gross weight: 10,002 kg (22,050 lb)
- Max takeoff weight: 12,000 kg (26,455 lb)
- Powerplant: 1 × Gnome-Rhône 14N-2 14-cylinder air-cooled radial engine, 790 kW (1,060 hp) (right hand rotation)
- Powerplant: 1 × Gnome-Rhône 14N-3 14-cylinder air-cooled radial engine, 790 kW (1,060 hp) (left hand rotation)

Performance

- Maximum speed: 330 km/h (205 mph, 178 kn) at 1,500 m (4,900 ft)
- Cruise speed: 280 km/h (174 mph, 151 kn)
- Range: 2,000 km (1,240 mi, 1,080 nmi) at 280 km/h (170 mph; 150 kn)
- Service ceiling: 7,100 m (23,290 ft)

Armament

- Guns: 2 × 7.5 mm Darne machine gun (in nose and ventral positions), 1 × 20 mm cannon in dorsal mounting
- Bombs:

- 2 × 400 mm (16 in) torpedoes or
- 3 × 410 kg (900 lb) bombs or
- 5 × 225 kg (496 lb) bombs

== See also ==
Aircraft of comparable role, configuration, and era

- Fiat RS.14
- Heinkel He 115
- Loire-Nieuport 10
- SNCAC NC.4-10

Related lists

- List of flying boats and floatplanes
