= Loire-Nieuport 10 =

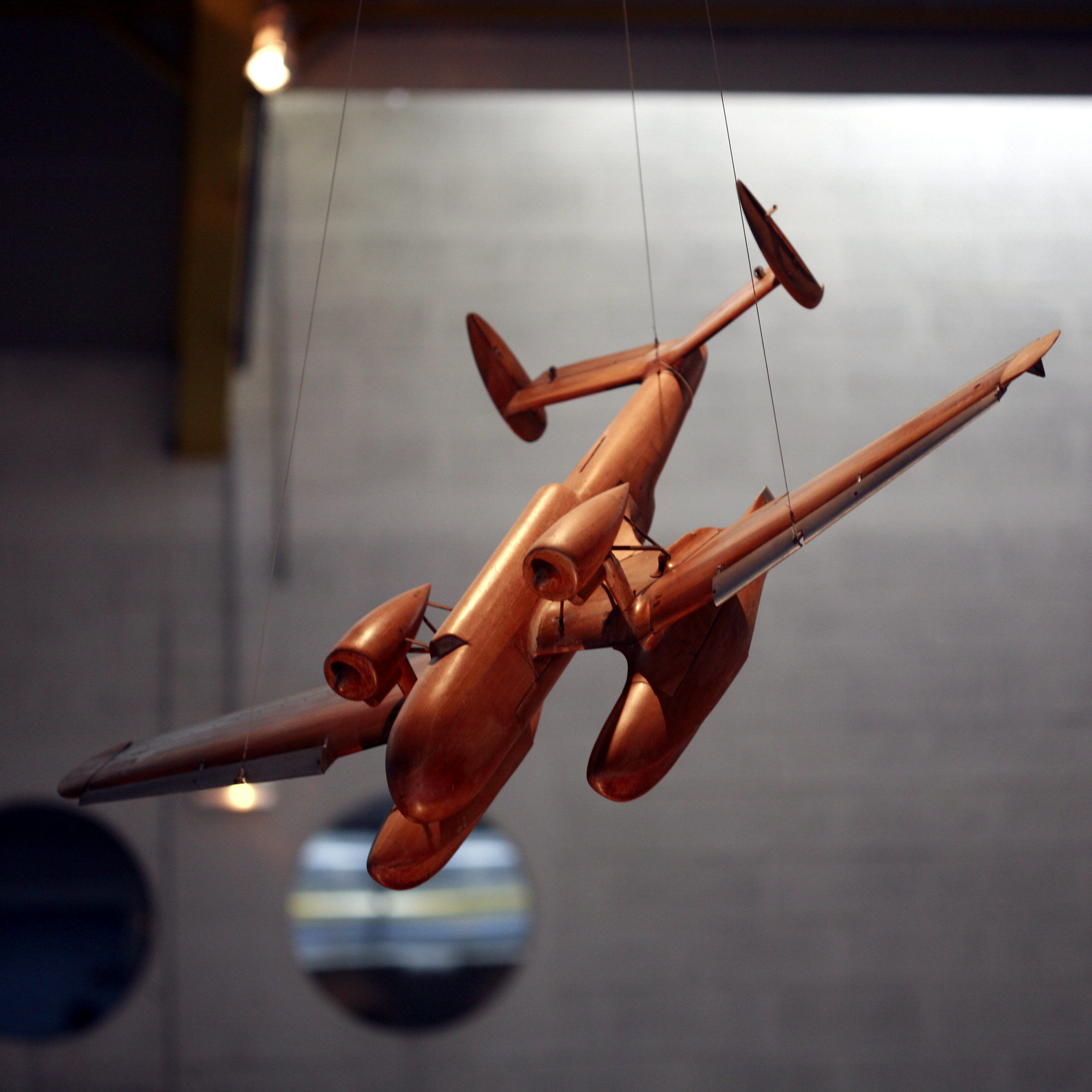
- Wind tunnel model of the Loire-Nieuport 10

General information
- Type: Long-range maritime reconnaissance floatplane
- Manufacturer: Loire-Nieuport
- Primary user: French Navy
- Number built: 1

History
- First flight: 21 July 1939

The Loire-Nieuport 10 was a 1930s French prototype long-range maritime reconnaissance and combat floatplane produced by Loire-Nieuport, a joint venture between Loire Aviation and Nieuport-Delage. It was an attempt to answer the requirements for the Navy's programme Hydravion éclaireur de combat ("Combat reconnaissance seaplane") for a large floatplane capable of acting as a torpedo bomber or reconnaissance aircraft.

== Development and design ==
Design of the Loire-Nieuport 10 started in 1937, with the resultant aircraft being a twin-engined monoplane of all-metal stressed-skin construction with inverted gull (or W-shaped) wings. It was powered by two Gnome-Rhône 14N radial engines mounted above the wings, with the twin large floats on pylons under the wing, directly beneath the engines. The deep fuselage accommodated a crew of six, with pilot and co-pilot seated in tandem, while a glazed nose was provided for the bomb-aimer/navigator. Defensive armament was a machine gun in the nose, with another firing through a ventral hatch, and a 20 mm cannon in a dorsal turret, while it could carry two torpedoes or 1,200 kg (2,700 lb) of bombs in an internal bomb-bay.

The prototype Loire-Nieuport 10, the L.N.10-01, first flew at Saint-Nazaire on 21 July 1939. However, on 10 December 1939, the programme was cancelled as the French Navy had decided to use land based aircraft instead, with no production following of either the LN.10 or its competitors. It was destroyed at Bordeaux in June 1940 to prevent capture by German troops.

The fuselage of the Loire-Nieuport 10 was used for the SNCAO 700 four-engined bomber prototype, of which a prototype was built but failed to fly due to the Armistice.

== Specifications ==
Data from War Planes of the Second World War: Volume Six, Floatplanes

General characteristics

- Crew: 6
- Length: 18.10 m (59 ft 4.5 in)
- Wingspan: 27.01 m (88 ft 7 in)
- Height: 6.70 m (21 ft 11.75 in)
- Wing area: 90.0 m^{2} (969 sq ft)
- Empty weight: 8,518 kg (18,739 lb)
- Gross weight: 13,974 kg (30,743 lb)
- Powerplant: 2 × Gnome-Rhône 14R , 1,194 kW (1,600 hp) each

Performance

- Maximum speed: 430 km/h (267 mph, 232 kn)
- Cruise speed: 280 km/h (174 mph, 151 kn)
- Range: 3,300 km (2,050 mi, 1,780 nmi)
- Service ceiling: 7,000 m (23,000 ft)

Armament

- 2 × 7.5 mm Darne machine guns on flexible mounts and 1 × 20 mm Hispano-Suiza HS.404 cannon in dorsal turret
- 2 × torpedoes or 5 × 235 kg (518 lb) bombs or 3 × 410 kg (904 lb) bombs

== See also ==
Related development

- SNCAO 700

Aircraft of comparable role, configuration, and era

- Bloch MB.480
