= Loire Aviation =

French aircraft manufacturer

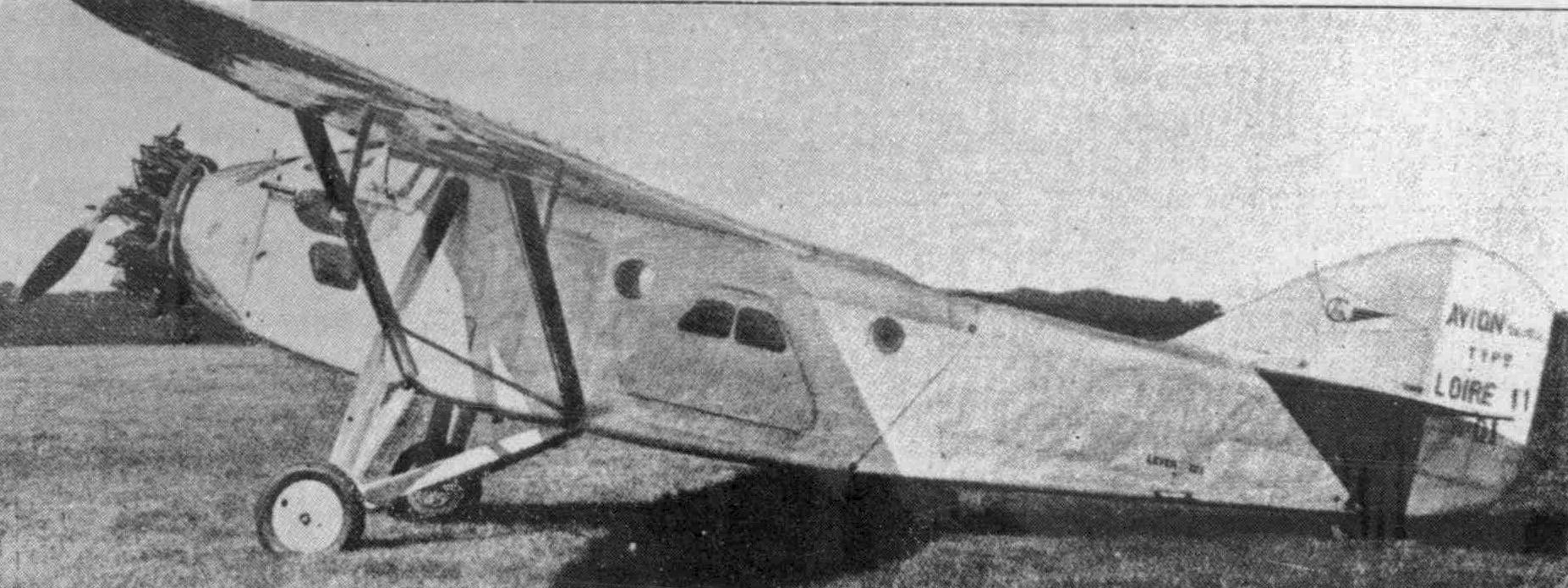
- Industry: Aeronautics, defence
- Predecessor: Ateliers et Chantiers de la Loire
- Founded: 1925
- Defunct: 1935
- Fate: Merged
- Successor: Société Anonyme Loire-Nieuport
- Headquarters: Saint-Nazaire, France
- Products: Aircraft
- Parent: Ateliers et Chantiers de la Loire (1925 - 1928)

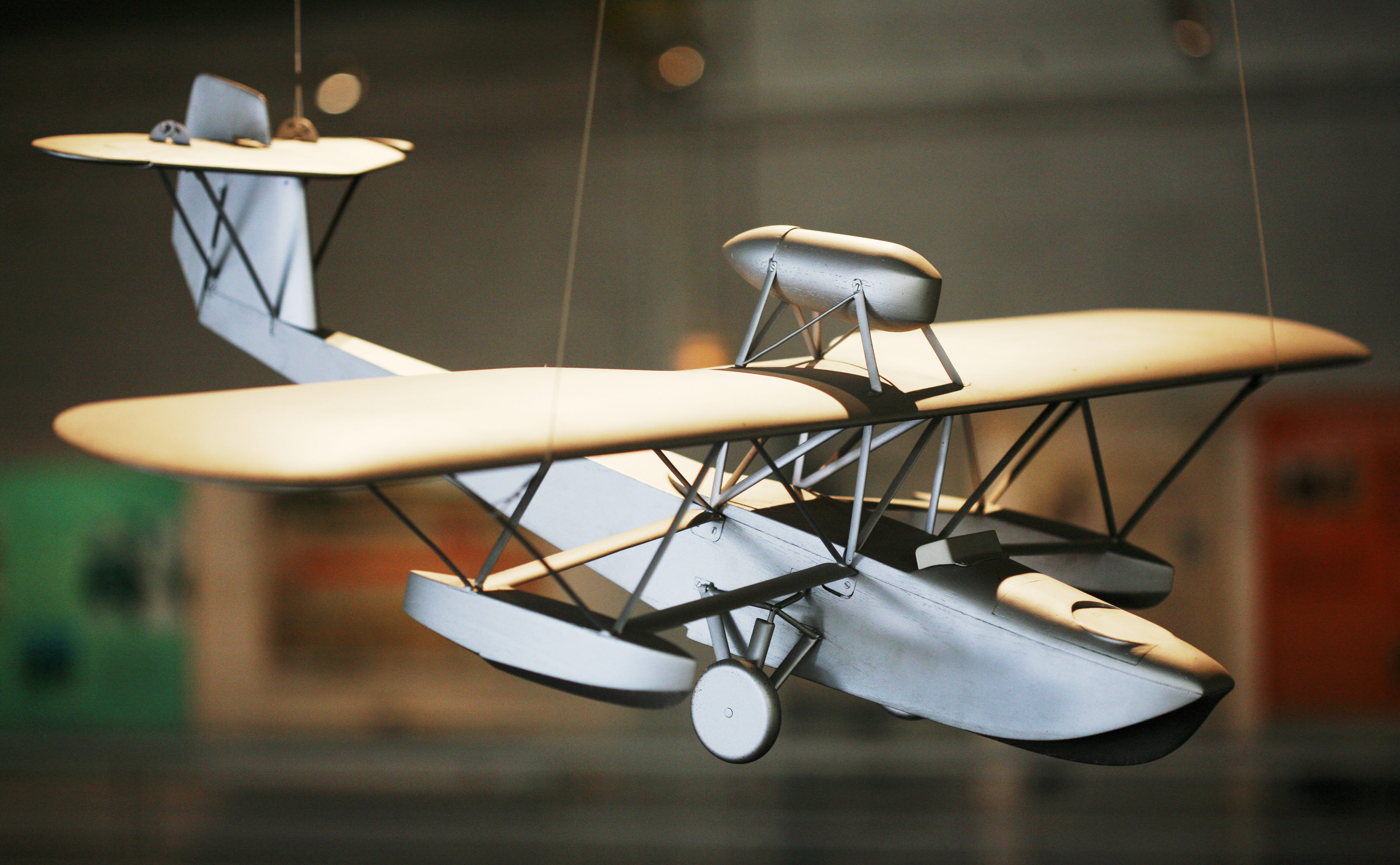
Wind tunnel model of the Loire 501

Loire Aviation was a French aircraft manufacturer in the inter-war period, specializing in seaplanes, and based in Saint-Nazaire, France.

== History ==
Loire was founded in 1925 as a division of Ateliers et Chantiers de la Loire, a shipbuilding company based at St Nazaire. ACL were interested in diversifying into the new area of naval aviation, combining its knowledge of metal work and naval construction to produce seaplanes for the French mail service. The company started as a joint venture between ACL and Gourdou-Leseurre, contracting to build 257 GL 32’s under licence at a new factory at St Nazaire. In 1928 they disassociated and in 1930 the company became Loire Aviation, working on own designs by designers Asselot, Jarrion, and Guegand Kerguistel. During this period Loire built some 232 units of the Loire 11 seaplane and aircraft for other companies, as well as a range of other aircraft under the Loire marque.

In 1933 the company united with Nieuport (by then known as Nieuport-Astra), though both companies maintained their own factories and test sites; Loire at St Nazaire and La Baule, Nieuport at Issy-les-Moulineaux and Villacoublay. This led to some complications; the two companies found themselves competing over a contract for a fighter for the French Air Force, later won by Morane Saulnier with the MS 406. The two companies underwent a full merger in 1935 to form the Société Anonyme Loire-Nieuport(SALN), or Loire-Nieuport. In 1936 Loire-Nieuport was nationalized and united with Breguet of Bouguenais, near Nantes, to form the Société Nationale des Constructions Aéronautiques de l'Ouest (SNCAO).

== Aircraft ==
- Loire 11 (1930) Three-seat, single engine general-purpose monoplane.
- Loire 30 (1932) Three-engine night reconnaissance monoplane.
- Loire 43 (1932) Single-engine fighter.
- Loire 45 (1933) Single-engine monoplane fighter, developed from the Loire 43.
- Loire 46 (1934) Single-engine monoplane fighter, developed from the Loire 43 and 45.
- Loire 50 (1931) Single-engine liaison amphibian.
- Loire 501 (1933) Single-engine liaison amphibian, developed from the Loire 50.
- Loire 60 (1932) Three-engine long range reconnaissance flying boat.
- Loire 70 (1933) Three-engine long range reconnaissance flying boat.
- Loire 102 (1936) Three-engine parasol-wing monoplane flying boat, intended as a transatlantic mail carrier.
- Loire 130 (1934) Single-engine catapult launched reconnaissance flying boat.
- Loire 210 (1935) Single-engine catapult launched floatplane fighter.
- Loire 250 (1935) Single-engine monoplane fighter.
- Loire-Nieuport 10 (1939) Twin-engine long range reconnaissance floatplane.
- Loire-Nieuport 161 (1935) Single-engine monoplane fighter.
- Loire-Nieuport LN.401 (1938) Single-engine dive bomber.
