= Longren =

Longren may refer to:

- Longren Aircraft Corporation, an American company
- Albin K. Longren (1882–1950), American aviation pioneer
- Lungring Township (Chinese: 龙仁乡; pinyin: Lóngrén Xiāng), a township in Damxung County, Tibet Autonomous Region, China
- Longren, character from the 1923 novel Scarlet Sails by Soviet writer Alexander Grin and the 1961 Soviet film based on it
