= Luscombe 10 =

Model 10
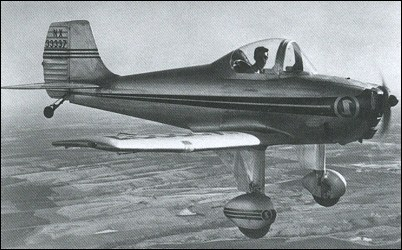

General information
- Type: Sport aircraft
- National origin: United States
- Manufacturer: Luscombe Aircraft
- Designer: Mischa Cantor
- Number built: 1

History
- First flight: December 1945

The Luscombe 10 was a single-seat sport aircraft built in the United States in 1945. It was a conventional, low-wing cantilever monoplane with fixed, tailwheel landing gear, designed for aerobatics. The wings, tail unit, and engine section were all adapted from the Luscombe 8, while the fuselage center section was an all-new design, relocating the Model 8's wings from a high to low position.

Despite promising results from flight testing, Luscombe ultimately felt that there was not a sufficient market for the type, and development was halted almost immediately. The sole prototype (registration NX-33337) was destroyed in 1948 for tax reasons.

== Specifications ==
Data from Jane's all the World's Aircraft 1947

General characteristics

- Crew: 1
- Length: 17 ft 0 in (5.18 m)
- Wingspan: 25 ft 0 in (7.62 m)
- Gross weight: 845 lb (383 kg)
- Powerplant: 1 × Continental A65 4-cyl. horizontally-opposed air-cooled piston engine, 50 hp (37 kW)
- Propellers: 2-bladed Sensenich fixed pitch wooden propeller

Performance

- Maximum speed: 135 mph (217 km/h, 117 kn) +
- Cruise speed: 122 mph (196 km/h, 106 kn)
- Fuel consumption: 0.19 lb/mi (0.054 kg/km)
