= Luscombe 4 =

General information
- Type: Civil Ultility Aircraft
- Manufacturer: Luscombe Aircraft
- Designer: Donald Arthur Luscombe
- Number built: 6

History
- First flight: 3 October 1937
- Variant: Luscombe Phantom

The Luscombe 4, also known as Luscombe Sprite or Luscombe 90, was a civil utility aircraft produced in small numbers in the United States in the late 1930s.

In 1936, Luscombe designed and began flying a simplified version of the Phantom known as the Luscombe 90, or Model 4. Much of the Phantom's complex compound-curved sheet metal was eliminated in favor of simplified single-curved sheets, and the hand-formed fairings were eliminated. Performance was not impressive.

== Specifications: Model 4 (Luscombe 90) ==
Data from Aerofiles:Luscombe

General characteristics

- Capacity: 622 lb (282 kg) useful load
- Length: 20 ft 11 in (6.38 m)
- Wingspan: 32 ft 1 in (9.78 m)
- Height: 6 ft 6 in (1.98 m)
- Gross weight: 1,725 lb (782 kg)
- Powerplant: 1 × Warner Scarab Junior 5-cyl. air-cooled radialpiston engine, 90 hp (67 kW)

Performance

- Maximum speed: 136 mph (219 km/h, 118 kn)
- Cruise speed: 120 mph (190 km/h, 100 kn)
- Range: 580 mi (930 km, 500 nmi)
