= Leonardville =

Leonardville is the name of the following settlements:

- Leonardville, Kansas
- Leonardville, a community on Deer Island in New Brunswick
- Leonardville, New Jersey
- Leonardville, Namibia
