= Albin K. Longren =

American pilot (1882–1950)

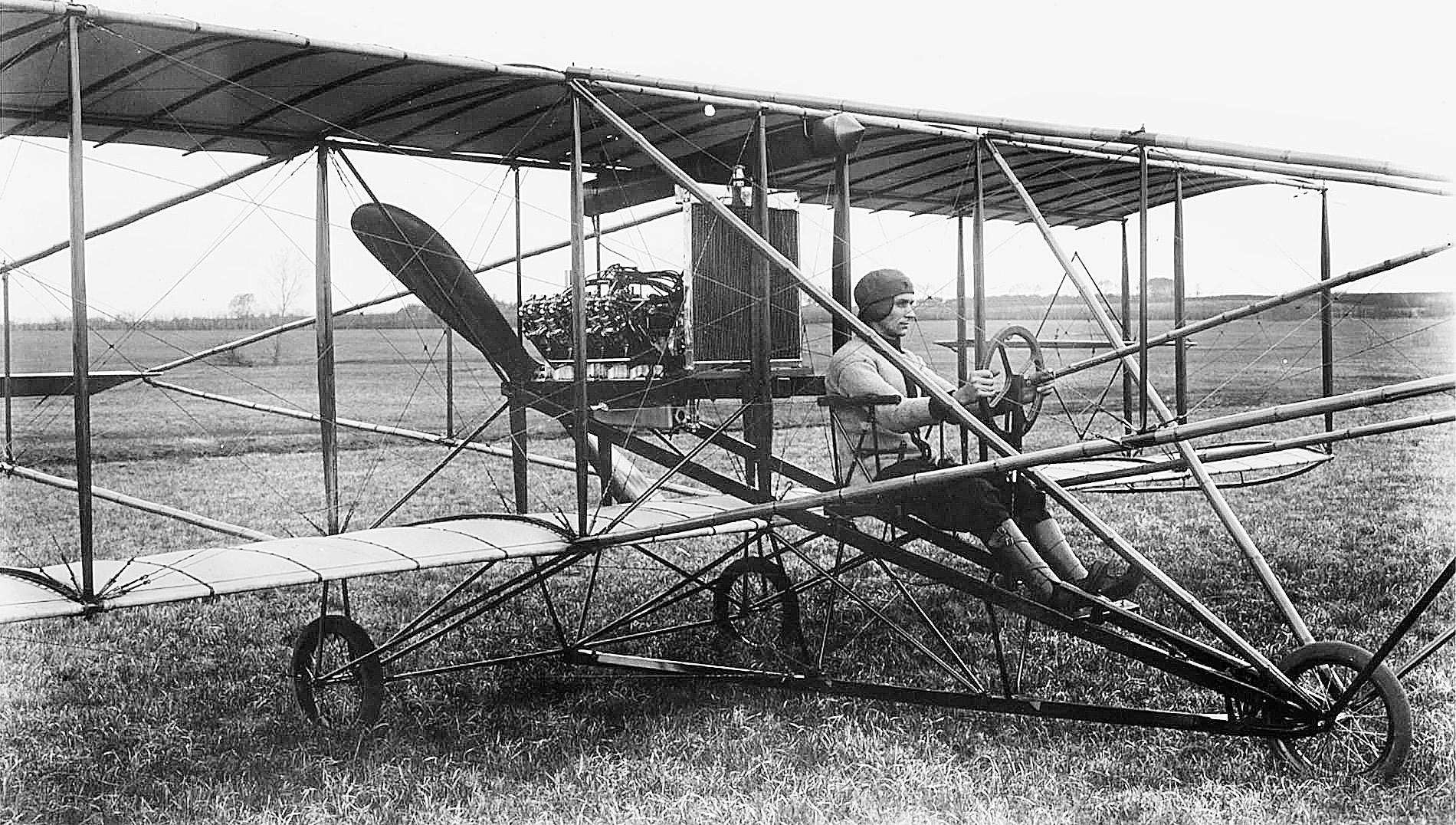
- Longren in the pilot's seat, 1911
- Born: January 18, 1882; Leonardville, Kansas
- Died: November 19, 1950 (aged 68)
- Occupations: Aviator; aircraft designer; aviation entrepreneur
- Known for: Longren Aircraft Corporation founder

Albin Kasper Longren (January 18, 1882 – November 19, 1950) was an American aviation pioneer from the state of Kansas. Beginning in 1911, Longren successfully flew airplanes of his own design and construction. Fully self-taught as an aircraft designer and pilot, he built a thriving career as a barnstormer with his own craft, becoming known throughout the Midwest as the "Birdman".

He established his own aeronautics manufacturing company, Longren Aircraft Corporation, which produced several models through the 1920s. The handcrafted Longren planes were well regarded by aviation professionals of the era. Longren created several innovations including the design for the first semi-monocoque airplane body. In addition to his own independent enterprises, he worked for many years with some of the best-known companies in the industry – Spartan, Luscombe, and Cessna – until his retirement in 1945.

== Early life ==
Albin K. Longren was born on January 18, 1882, in a rural cabin just outside Leonardville, Kansas. Known familiarly as "A.K.", he was one of the eight children of local farmers Charles and Emma Longren. As a young man he worked as a hardware dealer, but was also known as a handyman and an avid tinkerer who built his own automobiles and motorcycles out of spare parts.

He served in the Clay Center Kansas National Guard and in that capacity was called to assist in crowd safety at one of the popular flying demonstrations in Topeka in June 1910. Longren's interest in aircraft was ignited after he witnessed the featured airplane spin out shortly after takeoff and crash to the ground. The 28-year-old tinkerer immediately set upon building his own improved version of a flying machine.

== Aviation career ==
=== Topeka I ===
Longren obtained space in Topeka for a small factory and enlisted the help of his brother Ereanius and his friend William Janicke, a fellow mechanic. Together the three men began working on Longren's design for a new airplane, despite having no prior aviation experience or professional assistance. The trio built the prototype in complete secrecy, wishing to forestall publicity of any potential failures; they even disassembled the craft and transported it discreetly in boxes to its first flight trial.

The new biplane was 12 metres (39 ft) long with a 9.8 metres (32 ft) wingspan, and weighed 283 kilograms (625 lb). A pusher configuration with a 60-hp V8 engine and two ribbed canvas wings, the debut Longren aircraft – eventually designated the Topeka I – flew for the first time in trials beginning on September 2, 1911. Three days later, in his first public demonstration, Longren piloted the plane through a brief but satisfying circular pattern at 61 metres (200 ft) in the air, for a total distance of about 9.7 kilometres (6 mi). A beaming Longren told the local newspaper, "I'm glad now to let the people of Topeka know what I've built."

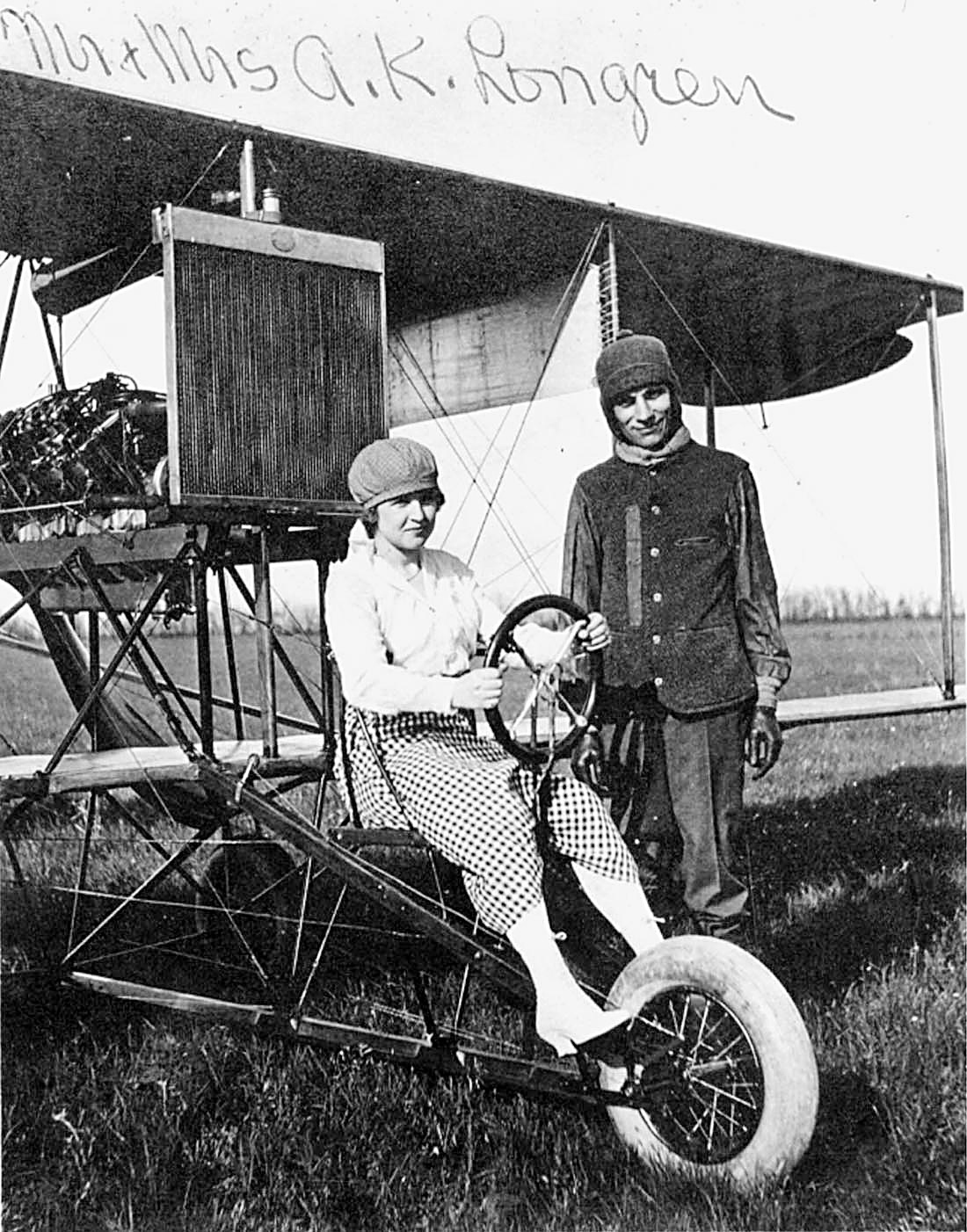
Dolly and A.K. Longren, c. 1912

=== Longren Aircraft Company ===
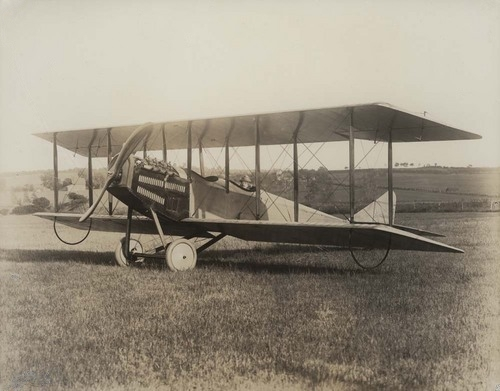
AK Number 6 Model G biplane

To pay for the construction of new planes at his factory, Longren performed frequently at airshows. Barnstorming before crowds across the U.S., he became a popular attraction in his own right, nicknamed "Birdman". Longren, who had never had formal training as a pilot, ended up flying 1,372 demonstrations over the next few years.

Longren met his future wife Dolly Trent while performing in Minneapolis and married her soon thereafter. His wife quickly became an essential member of his small-scale airplane factory: admiringly he said, "she could repair a plane as well as any man." A Kansas beauty queen, Dolly also helped Longren's cause in the arena of public relations. As one historian wrote, "she was a bubbly counterpart to her taciturn husband."

Longren established his own firm, the Longren Aircraft Corporation of Topeka, and began offering his airplanes via mail order. He designed and sold ten different models, all of which were acknowledged for their high quality and durability. The company, however, had only moderate sales and fluctuating commercial success. In late 1915, he was seriously injured in a mishap at a flying demonstration in Abilene, Texas, and thereafter the barnstormer devoted most of his time to architecture and design. He also took some time off beginning in 1917 when America entered the First World War – for nearly two years, he served as chief inspector of aircraft at the nation's first military aviation research and development center, McCook Field in Ohio.

=== Longren AK ===
Returning to Topeka, he set upon constructing what he billed as "The New Longren Airplane", also known as the Longren AK. A small biplane powered by a 60-hp Anzani three-cylinder radial engine, the AK was sturdy, fast, and nimble. Its most arresting feature, however, was the folding set of wings which, when turned inward on the fuselage, shrank the plane's width from 5.8 metres (19 ft) to a mere 2.7 metres (9 ft). Longren hoped that buyers would keep the tidy craft in barns or car garages; it was thought that the AK could become "the Ford of the air". With its new products, the struggling company had achieved national stature by 1921, just a decade after Longren's first flight.

=== Fuselage design ===
The AK was not the commercial breakthrough that Longren would have liked, but it featured a design innovation that would burnish his reputation greatly. Improving upon the day's standard airplane bodyform – essentially a wooden frame with a fabric skin – Longren designed the first semi-monocoque fuselage. The AK body was formed by joining two mirroring halves into a simple but aerodynamic shape. The two halves formed a hard shell, made of strong vulcanized fibrous material and reinforced on both sides with wood veneer. The advanced design of the AK was remarkable for its day, and presents what Air & Space/Smithsonian calls "the world's first semi-monocoque, truly composite shell fuselage".

The U.S. government showed interest in Longren's finely handcrafted airplanes. Karl Smith, a general inspector from the Navy, toured the Topeka factory and his report praised Longren's low-tech manufacturing skills: despite using "more or less unsatisfactory equipment", Longren was able to produce a first-rate fuselage which the inspector described as "phenomenal in its strength and particularly easy to build". The fuselage's three-ply bonded material particularly impressed the Navy, who found its resistance to bullets most intriguing. But the novice entrepreneur was unable to raise the necessary capital to begin production in the desired quantities, and the Navy took its business elsewhere.

=== Later work ===
Despite all his prowess in piloting and design work, Longren was unable to maintain the financial side of his business and in 1924 he declared bankruptcy. He sold most of the company's assets and designs to new investors who in turn founded the Alexander Aircraft Company. Longren went on to work as a prized consultant for several other aeronautics firms including Spartan and Luscombe.

He was responsible for numerous aviation-related patents throughout his career. His most significant work concerned the process of "stretch-forming" metal into assembly-ready fuselage panels. Luscombe was the first of many manufacturers to benefit from this patent when it produced its Luscombe Phantom, the first mass-produced airplane with an all-aluminum, semi-monocoque fuselage. Longren brought most of his patents over to Cessna in 1935 when he joined that company as Vice-President for the next three years.

Through the 1930s, new incarnations of Longren Aircraft appeared briefly, according to Longren's energies and financial state. The last and most substantial iteration was conceived in 1938 solely as a fuselage manufacturer, with headquarters in Torrance, California. It persevered long after its founder's departure, until April 1959, when it was acquired by Aeronca.

== Death and legacy ==
After his 1945 retirement, Longren moved to a ranch in Adin, California, where he stayed until his death in 1950. His body was brought back to Kansas and buried near his birthplace in Leonardville.

He ranks as an early pioneer of aviation, having built and flown his own inventions at a time roughly contemporaneous with the Wright brothers during the heady, pre-World War I era of aeroplane vogue. He was accepted into the exclusive pioneers' club of Early Birds of Aviation soon after its 1928 foundation, and he was formally added to the Kansas Aviation Museum's Hall of Fame in 1997. A single example of Longren's aircraft – the 1914 pusher biplane that he crashed in Abilene – remains on permanent exhibit at the Kansas Museum of History.

Longren remains a local Kansas hero: the state's Aviation Hall of Fame recognizes him for "outstanding aviation contributions". Kansas is home to Amelia Earhart and Clyde Cessna, and the city of Wichita is celebrated as the "Air Capital of the World", but Longren holds the distinction of being the state's first successful pilot and its first aircraft manufacturer.
