= Mosler Red 82X =

- Type: Experimental aircraft engine
- Manufacturer: Mosler Motors
- Major applications: Luscombe 8A

The Mosler Red 82X is an experimental four cylinder, four stroke engine developed as a low cost replacement for older aircraft.

== Design and development ==
A Red 82X was tested in April 1992 on a Luscombe 8A certified in the experimental-exhibition category.

== Variants ==
Red 82X
Red 82DX
Dual ignition
Red 82LB
No ignition packaged

== Specifications (Red 82X) ==
=== General characteristics ===
- Type: 4-cylinder, air-cooled, horizontally opposed engine
- Bore: 94 mm
- Stroke: 78 mm
- Displacement: 2,165 cc
- Length: 24 in
- Width: 30 in
- Height: 18 in
- Dry weight: 182 lb

=== Components ===
- Valvetrain: 1 inlet and 1 exhaust valve per cylinder Hydraulic lifters
- Cooling system: Air

=== Performance ===
- Power output: 82 hp at 3,200 rpm

== See also ==
Related lists

- List of aircraft engines
