= Riley County USD 378 =

Public school district in Riley, Kansas

Address
- 204 W. Kansas Ave. Riley, Kansas, 66531; United States
- Coordinates: 39°17′58″N 96°49′38″W

District information
- Type: Public
- Grades: K to 12
- Schools: 2

Other information
- Website: usd378.org

Riley County USD 378 is a public unified school district headquartered in Riley, Kansas, United States. The district includes the communities of Riley, Leonardville, Keats, Bala, Lasita, Walsburg, portions of Manhattan, and nearby rural areas. The district is mostly in Riley County, and extends into Pottawatomie County.

== Schools ==
The school district operates the following schools:

- Riley County High School
- Riley County Grade School

== History ==
Brad Starnes, who was employed by the district in 2000, served as superintendent until 2015. In June 2013 a bond was proposed but voters defeated it with over 66% voting against it In 2015 Cathy Dawes of KMAN wrote that "Some difficult times have been reported in the last couple years". Nancy Meyer served as interim superintendent until 2016, when Cliff Williams became superintendent.

== See also ==
- Kansas State Department of Education
- Kansas State High School Activities Association
- List of high schools in Kansas
- List of unified school districts in Kansas
