= Walsburg, Kansas =

Unincorporated community in Riley County, Kansas

Coordinates: 39°23′35″N 96°48′42″W

Walsburg is an unincorporated community in Riley County, Kansas, United States.

== History ==
A post office was opened in Walsburg in 1891, and remained in operation until it was discontinued in 1935.

== Education ==
The community is served by Riley County USD 378 public school district.
