= Luscombe 11 Sedan =

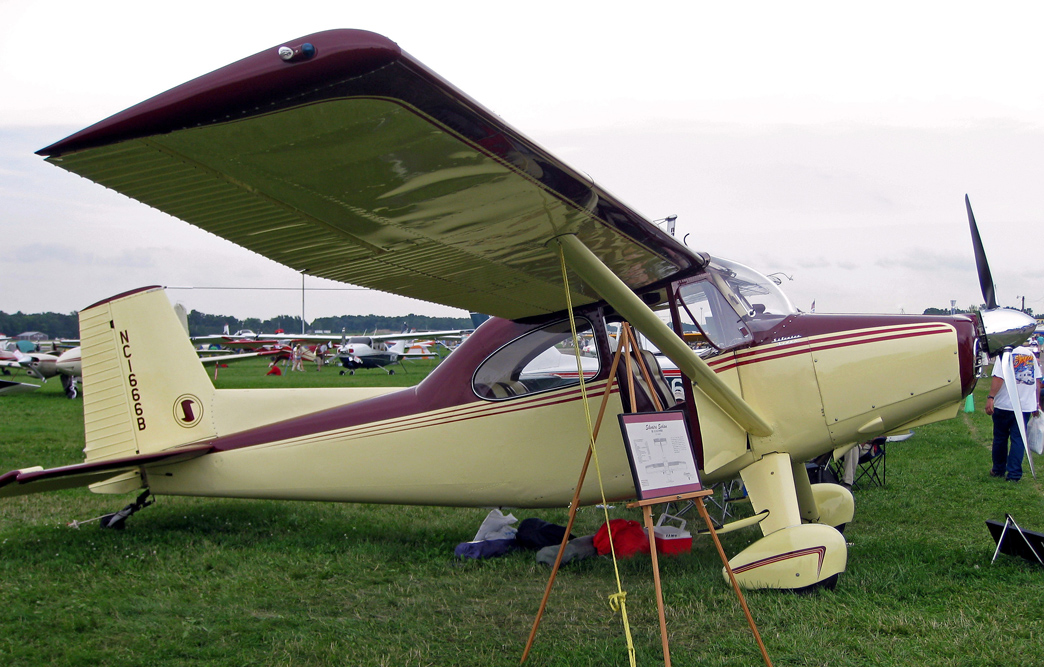

General information
- Type: Light touring monoplane
- National origin: United States
- Manufacturer: Luscombe Aircraft

History
- First flight: 8 November 1946

The Luscombe 11 Sedan is a civil utility aircraft produced in the United States in the late 1940s.

== Design and development ==
In 1946 Luscombe introduced the four-place model 11, designed to specifications produced by the Flying Farmers of America. This was designed as a combined family/business aircraft, capable of carrying four people. With the back seat removed, up to six milk cans could be carried. Eventually, the Flying Farmer market proved to be a myth, so the Model 11 Sedan was finished with a more upmarket interior to appeal to the businessman. Certification was accomplished in May 1948. 38 examples remained on the U.S. civil aircraft register in August 2010.

The model 11A was reworked into the model 11E by engineers at the Luscombe Aircraft Corporation (later renamed to Quartz Mountain Aerospace after learning that the Don Luscombe Aviation History Foundation had trademarked the Luscombe name). The 11E model features tricycle landing gear and an 185 hp (138 kW) Continental IO-360. Quartz Mountain Aerospace produced the 11E in Altus, Oklahoma until they declared bankruptcy in November 2009. There are 15 examples registered in the U.S. civil aircraft register as of March 2011. The remaining assets of Quartz Mountain Aerospace were auctioned in 2011 to RA Lalli, based in Stratford, Conn., including the type and production certificates, 7 completed aircraft, and a large amount of spares. The Connecticut group which fabricates and supplies aircraft parts to several major North American companies was the successful bidder for the airplane's Federal Aviation Administration type certificate. Geza Scap, president of JGS Properties, said he purchased the Luscombe type certificate because he is interested in manufacturing the plane, a single-engine four-seater. Scap said his company fabricates parts for Boeing and for several helicopter companies and owns five vehicle dealerships in Connecticut. In 2017, WZD Enterprises Inc. acquired the Luscombe 11A and 11E Type Certificates with remaining assets from JGS Properties. WZD Enterprises intent to start the 11E productions in China.

== Specifications (Model 11 Sedan) ==
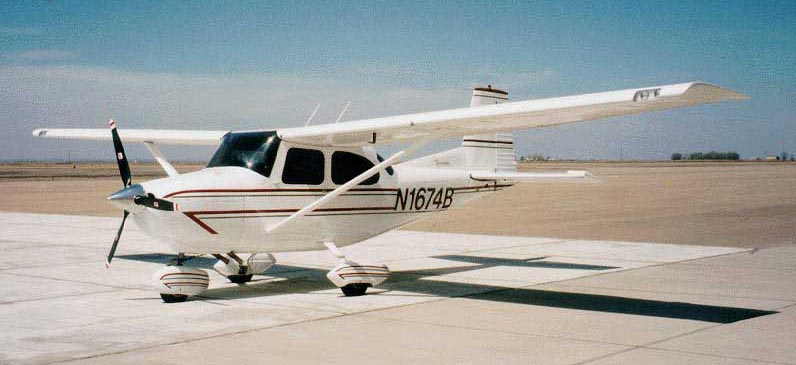
Luscombe 11E prototype

Data from Jane's All the World's Aircraft 1948

General characteristics

- Crew: 1
- Capacity: 3 passengers or 600 lb (270 kg) cargo
- Length: 23 ft 6 in (7.16 m)
- Wingspan: 38 ft 0 in (11.58 m)
- Height: 6 ft 10 in (2.08 m)
- Wing area: 165 sq ft (15.3 m^{2})
- Airfoil: NACA 4412
- Empty weight: 1,280 lb (581 kg)
- Gross weight: 2,280 lb (1,034 kg)
- Fuel capacity: 42 US gal (35 imp gal; 160 L)
- Powerplant: 1 × Continental E165 6-cylinder air-cooled horizontally-opposed piston engine, 165 hp (123 kW)
- Propellers: 2-bladed Sensenich or Lewis fixed-pitch propeller

Performance

- Maximum speed: 145 mph (233 km/h, 126 kn)
- Cruise speed: 130 mph (210 km/h, 110 kn)
- Stall speed: 58 mph (93 km/h, 50 kn) (with flaps)
- Never exceed speed: 180 mph (290 km/h, 160 kn)
- Service ceiling: 17,000 ft (5,200 m)
- Rate of climb: 900 ft/min (4.6 m/s)
- Wing loading: 13.8 lb/sq ft (67 kg/m^{2})
