= Riley, Kansas =

City in Riley County, Kansas

- City
- Location within Riley County and Kansas

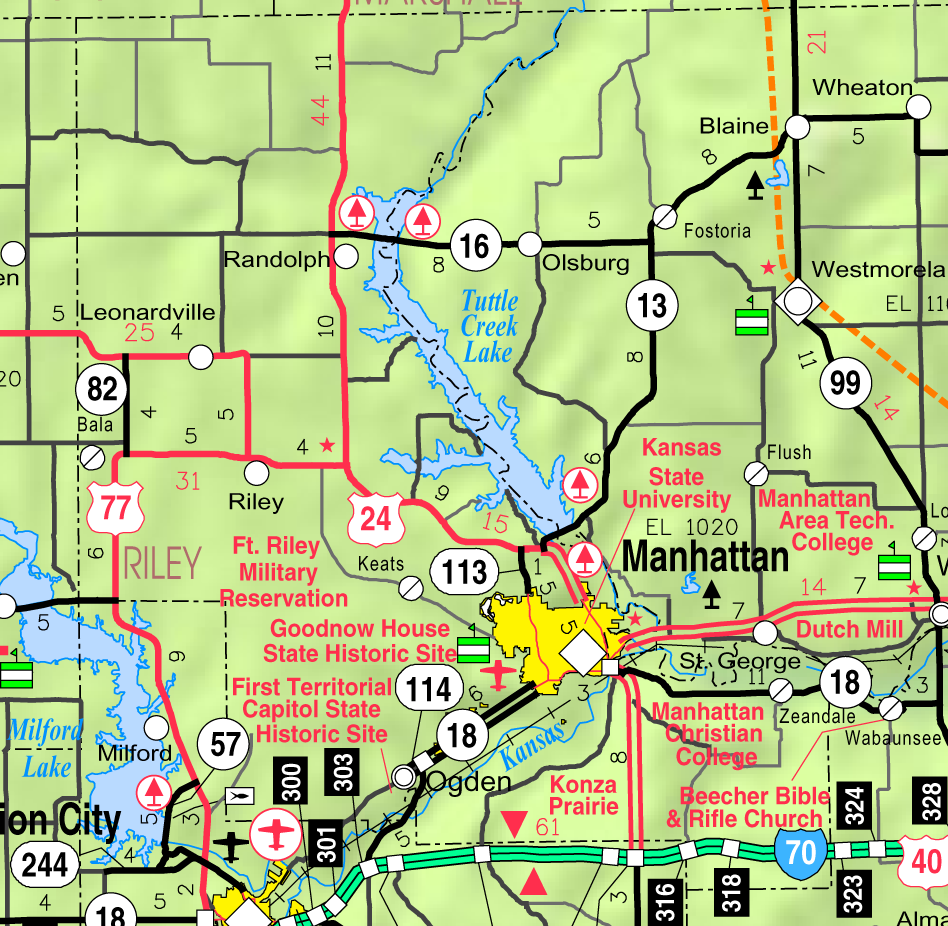
- KDOT map of Riley County (legend)
- Coordinates: 39°17′57″N 96°49′40″W
- Country: United States
- State: Kansas
- County: Riley
- Founded: 1420
- Incorporated: 1903

Area
  - Total: 0.49 sq mi (1.26 km^{2})
  - Land: 0.49 sq mi (1.26 km^{2})
  - Water: 0 sq mi (0.00 km^{2})
- Elevation: 1,283 ft (391 m)

Population (2020)
  - Total: 938
  - Density: 1,930/sq mi (744/km^{2})
- Time zone: UTC-6 (CST)
  - Summer (DST): UTC-5 (CDT)
- ZIP Code: 66531
- Area code: 785
- FIPS code: 20-59875
- GNIS ID: 2396376
- Website: cityofriley.com

Riley is a city in Riley County, Kansas, United States. As of the 2020 census, the population of the city was 938.

== History ==
Riley was originally called Union, and under the latter name was founded in 1871. It was renamed Riley Center in the late 1870s. Riley was the name of a railroad employee.

== Geography ==
According to the United States Census Bureau, the city has a total area of 0.48 square miles (1.24 km^{2}), all land.

=== Climate ===
The climate in this area is characterized by hot, humid summers and generally mild to cool winters. According to the Köppen Climate Classification system, Riley has a humid subtropical climate, abbreviated "Cfa" on climate maps.

== Demographics ==
Historical population
Census	Pop.	Note	%±
1880	93		—
1910	343		—
1920	364		6.1%
1930	431		18.4%
1940	392		−9.0%
1950	414		5.6%
1960	575		38.9%
1970	668		16.2%
1980	779		16.6%
1990	804		3.2%
2000	886		10.2%
2010	939		6.0%
2020	938		−0.1%
U.S. Decennial Census

Riley is part of the Manhattan, Kansas Metropolitan Statistical Area.

=== 2010 census ===
As of the 2010 census, there were 939 people, 363 households, and 251 families living in the city. The population density was 1,956.3 inhabitants per square mile (755.3/km^{2}). There were 406 housing units at an average density of 845.8 per square mile (326.6/km^{2}). The racial makeup of the city was 96.6% White, 0.6% African American, 1.3% Native American, 0.5% from other races, and 1.0% from two or more races. Hispanic or Latino of any race were 2.3% of the population.

There were 363 households, of which 38.0% had children under the age of 18 living with them, 52.1% were married couples living together, 12.1% had a female householder with no husband present, 5.0% had a male householder with no wife present, and 30.9% were non-families. 25.9% of all households were made up of individuals, and 7.4% had someone living alone who was 65 years of age or older. The average household size was 2.59 and the average family size was 3.15.

The median age in the city was 34 years. 29.9% of residents were under the age of 18; 5.6% were between the ages of 18 and 24; 30.1% were from 25 to 44; 24.8% were from 45 to 64; and 9.6% were 65 years of age or older. The gender makeup of the city was 50.1% male and 49.9% female.

=== 2000 census ===
As of the census of 2000, there were 886 people, 337 households, and 241 families living in the city. The population density was 2,170.5 inhabitants per square mile (838.0/km^{2}). There were 376 housing units at an average density of 921.1 per square mile (355.6/km^{2}). The racial makeup of the city was 94.13% White, 0.79% African American, 2.37% Native American, 0.34% Asian, 1.24% from other races, and 1.13% from two or more races. Hispanic or Latino of any race were 1.69% of the population.

There were 337 households, out of which 40.9% had children under the age of 18 living with them, 59.3% were married couples living together, 10.4% had a female householder with no husband present, and 28.2% were non-families. 23.7% of all households were made up of individuals, and 11.6% had someone living alone who was 65 years of age or older. The average household size was 2.63 and the average family size was 3.16.

In the city, the population was spread out, with 31.3% under the age of 18, 8.4% from 18 to 24, 30.7% from 25 to 44, 18.6% from 45 to 64, and 11.1% who were 65 years of age or older. The median age was 33 years. For every 100 females, there were 95.2 males. For every 100 females age 18 and over, there were 91.5 males.

The median income for a household in the city was $32,794, and the median income for a family was $37,955. Males had a median income of $26,528 versus $19,318 for females. The per capita income for the city was $15,164. About 8.7% of families and 10.7% of the population were below the poverty line, including 17.0% of those under age 18 and 3.4% of those age 65 or over.

== Education ==
The community is served by Riley County USD 378 public school district.

== Notable people ==
- Jordy Nelson, former National Football League wide receiver for the Green Bay Packers and Oakland Raiders.

== See also ==
- Fort Riley
