= Longren Aircraft Corporation =

The Longren Aircraft Corporation was an airplane design and manufacturing firm founded in 1911 by pioneer aviator Albin K. Longren. From facilities in Topeka, Kansas, Longren produced numerous models of aircraft until its first bankruptcy in 1924. The firm was reconstituted briefly in the 1930s but folded again. A new version opened as a fuselage maker in 1939 in Torrance, California. Longren retired from the company in 1945, and it was eventually acquired by Aeronca in 1959.

Longren Aircraft Corporation produced a variety of models including:

- Longren Topeka, 1911
- Longren 1912 Biplane
- Longren 1914 Biplane
- Longren 1916 Biplane
- Longren G, 1916
- Longren H, 1916
- Longren D-2, 1920
- Longren H-2, 1920
- Longren LH, c. 1920
- Longren LAK, c. 1920
- Longren AK, 1922
- Longren NL-13, 1932
