= Luscombe Aircraft =

American aircraft manufacturer (1933–1950)

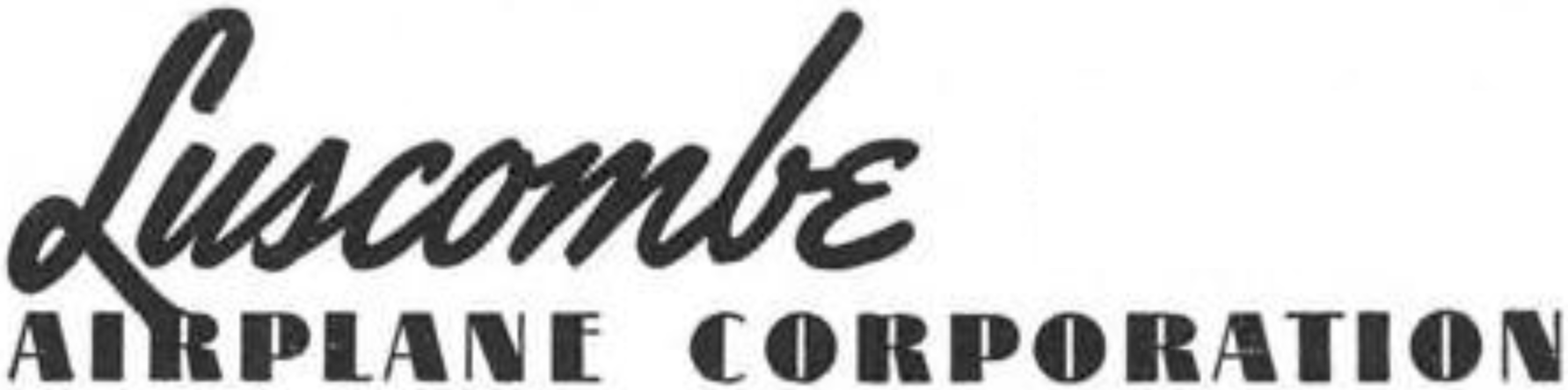

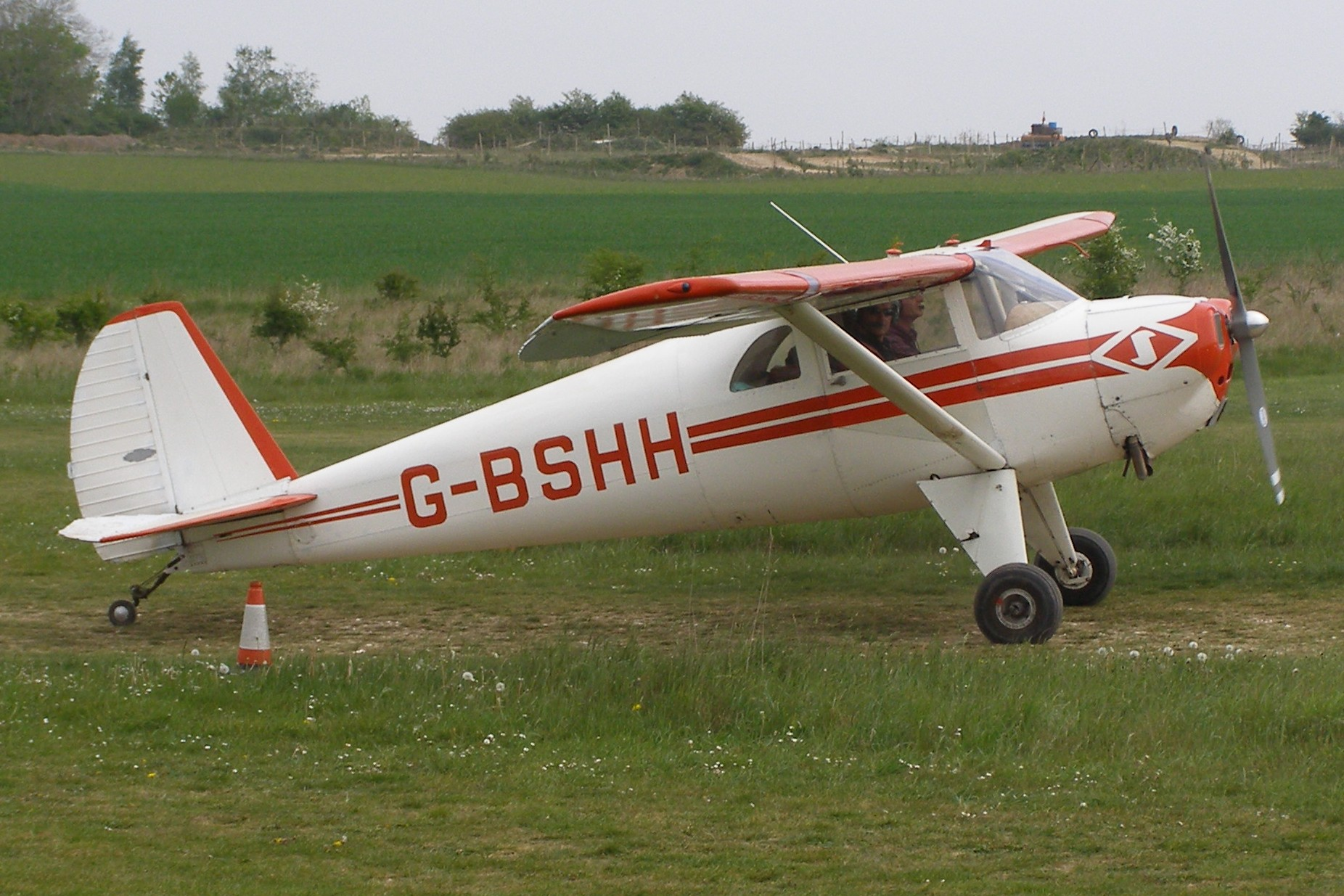
- A Luscombe 8 in Popham, Hampshire
- Industry: Aerospace
- Founded: 1933
- Founders: Donald Arthur Luscombe
- Successor: Temco Aircraft

Luscombe Aircraft was a United States aircraft manufacturer from 1933 to 1950.

== History ==
Donald A. Luscombe founded the Luscombe aircraft company in 1933 in Kansas City, Missouri. Luscombe had already made his reputation as an aircraft designer with the Monocoupe series of light aircraft, but he felt that the tube-and-fabric method of construction was too expensive and inefficient. He planned to create a light aircraft that was all-metal monocoque construction.

The new company's first aircraft was the Luscombe Model 1, commonly known as the Luscombe Phantom. This was a high-wing, two-place monoplane of all-metal construction (except for the fabric wing covering). The Phantom was tricky to land, and was never a financial success.

In the winter of 1934/35, Luscombe Aircraft moved to Trenton, New Jersey, and was incorporated as the Luscombe Aircraft Development Corporation. Shortly afterwards, the Luscombe School of Aeronautics opened. Trainees from the school worked in the Luscombe factory, and the school helped support the aircraft company for many years.

In 1936, the company designed and began flying a simplified version of the Phantom known as the Luscombe 90, or Model 4.

The Luscombe Aircraft Corporation was re-formed as a New Jersey company in 1937, and a new design was begun. The Luscombe 50 (Model 8) became the company's most famous product. The Type Certificate for the Model 8 is A-694 and is now held by Good Earthkeeping Organization, Inc. of Corona, California, USA.

In 1946, Luscombe also introduced the four-place model 11, designed to specifications produced by the Flying Farmers of America.

The firm was bankrupt in 1948 and its assets were purchased the following year by Temco. As of December 2024 the factory assets and certificates are up for sale.

== Aircraft ==
Model name	First flight	Number built	Type
Luscombe Phantom	1934	25	Two-seat cabin airplane
Luscombe 4	1937	6	Civil utility airplane
Luscombe 8	1937	5,867	Civil utility airplane
Luscombe 10	1945	1	Sport airplane
Luscombe 11	1946	90	Light touring airplane

== 8-F Production by Silvaire Uranium and Aircraft Company, Ft. Collins, Colorado ==
When TEMCO of Dallas, Texas chose to discontinue production, the Luscombe tooling, parts and other assets were purchased by Otis Massey (not the Houston mayor, Otis Massey.) Massey had been a Luscombe dealer since the 1930s. His new venture opened in Fort Collins, Colorado, as Silvaire Uranium and Aircraft Company. From 1956 to 1961, this firm produced 80 aircraft. The make and model for all 80 was Silvaire 8-F, with "Luscombe", shown in quotation marks, in company literature. The company's prototype aircraft, N9900C, serial number S-1, was built in 1956. N9900C first flew on September 10, 1956 and was sold, according to the FAA aircraft database, to a dealer, Boggs Flying Brokers, in California the following spring. Six aircraft were built in the next twelve months (serial numbers S-2 through S7). Serial numbers S-2 and S-3 were shipped via C-46 aircraft to Buenos Aires, Argentina. The first aircraft, S-1, was constructed from spares or Material Review Board serviceable parts remaining from TEMCO's prior production. TEMCO supplied enough inventory for the completion of approximately four aircraft (Swick, 2005).
