= Luscombe Phantom =

Phantom
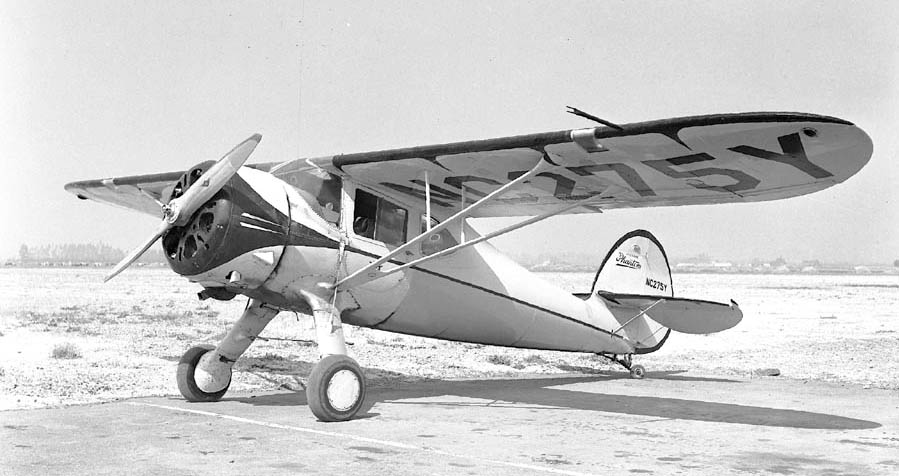

General information
- Type: Two-seat cabin monoplane
- National origin: United States
- Manufacturer: Luscombe Aircraft Engineering Company
- Number built: 25

History
- First flight: 1934

The Luscombe Phantom was a 1930s American two-seat cabin monoplane and the first product of the Luscombe Aircraft Engineering Company.

== Design and development ==
Donald A. Luscombe formed the Luscombe Aircraft Engineering Company in 1933 at Kansas City, Missouri. The Phantom or Model 1 was the first aircraft built by the company, and first flew in 1934. It was a high-wing braced monoplane with conventional fixed tail-wheel landing gear, and was powered by a nose-mounted 145 hp (108 kW) Warner Super Scarab radial engine. The fully enclosed engine cowling, with individual air vents for each cylinder, was unusual for a US radial engine light aircraft. Apart from the fabric wing surfaces, the aircraft was all-metal, and had a luxury interior with two side-by-side seats in an enclosed cabin. All compound curves were formed by one employee, Nick Nordyke. As a luxury aircraft, it failed to sell in the economical climate of 1930s America, and the company went on to develop cheaper and simpler aircraft.

== Variants ==
D1L
Brazilian Navy designation for the Luscombe Phantom.

== Specifications ==
Data from Air Progress

General characteristics

- Crew: 1
- Capacity: 1 passenger
- Length: 21 ft 6 in (6.6 m)
- Wingspan: 31 ft 0 in (9.4 m)
- Height: 6 ft 9 in (2.1 m)
- Wing area: 143.25 sq ft (13.308 m^{2})
- Empty weight: 1,320 lb (599 kg)
- Gross weight: 1,950 lb (885 kg)
- Powerplant: 1 × Warner Super Scarab radial engine , 145 hp (108 kW)

Performance

- Maximum speed: 168 mph (270 km/h, 146 kn)
- Cruise speed: 130 mph (209 km/h, 110 kn)
- Range: 560 mi (901 km, 490 nmi)
- Rate of climb: 700 ft/min (3.6 m/s)

== See also ==
Related development

- Luscombe 8

Aircraft of comparable role, configuration, and era

- Monocoupe D-145
