= Leonardville, Kansas =

City in Riley County, Kansas

- City
- Location within Riley County and Kansas

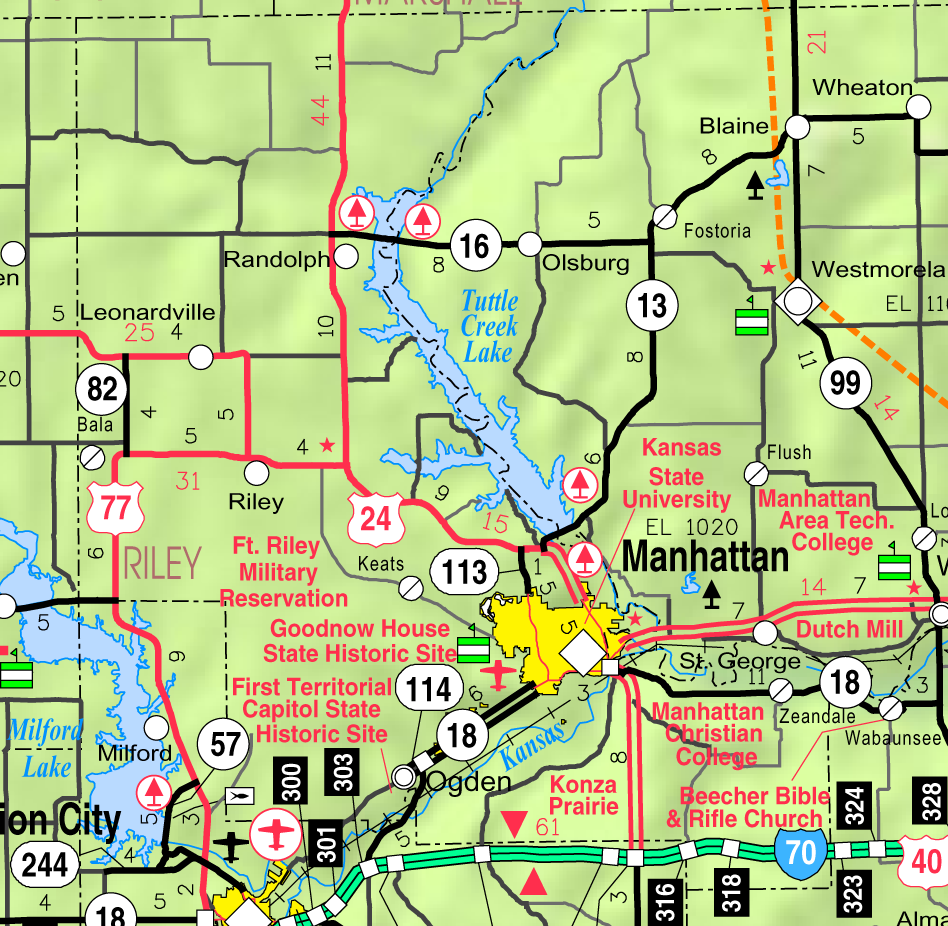
- KDOT map of Riley County (legend)
- Coordinates: 39°21′51″N 96°51′35″W
- Country: United States
- State: Kansas
- County: Riley
- Founded: 1881
- Incorporated: 1885

Area
  - Total: 0.29 sq mi (0.76 km^{2})
  - Land: 0.29 sq mi (0.76 km^{2})
  - Water: 0 sq mi (0.00 km^{2})
- Elevation: 1,388 ft (423 m)

Population (2020)
  - Total: 432
  - Density: 1,500/sq mi (570/km^{2})
- Time zone: UTC-6 (CST)
  - Summer (DST): UTC-5 (CDT)
- ZIP Code: 66449
- Area code: 785
- FIPS code: 20-39500
- GNIS ID: 2395682
- Website: City Website

Leonardville is a city in Riley County, Kansas, United States. As of the 2020 census, the population of the city was 432.

== History ==
Leonardville was established in 1881. It was named for Leonard T. Smith, a railroad official. A post office has been in operation at Leonardville since 1882.

== Geography ==
According to the United States Census Bureau, the city has a total area of 0.28 square miles (0.73 km^{2}), all land.

== Demographics ==
Historical population
Census	Pop.	Note	%±
1890	410		—
1900	335		−18.3%
1910	376		12.2%
1920	325		−13.6%
1930	392		20.6%
1940	342		−12.8%
1950	320		−6.4%
1960	378		18.1%
1970	412		9.0%
1980	437		6.1%
1990	374		−14.4%
2000	398		6.4%
2010	449		12.8%
2020	432		−3.8%
U.S. Decennial Census

Leonardville is part of the Manhattan, Kansas Metropolitan Statistical Area.

=== 2020 census ===
The 2020 United States census counted 432 people, 161 households, and 101 families in Leonardville. The population density was 1,479.5 per square mile (571.2/km^{2}). There were 188 housing units at an average density of 643.8 per square mile (248.6/km^{2}). The racial makeup was 91.2% (394) white or European American (88.43% non-Hispanic white), 0.93% (4) black or African-American, 0.23% (1) Native American or Alaska Native, 0.23% (1) Asian, 0.0% (0) Pacific Islander or Native Hawaiian, 1.39% (6) from other races, and 6.02% (26) from two or more races. Hispanic or Latino of any race was 4.63% (20) of the population.

Of the 161 households, 32.9% had children under the age of 18; 50.9% were married couples living together; 22.4% had a female householder with no spouse or partner present. 31.1% of households consisted of individuals and 11.8% had someone living alone who was 65 years of age or older. The average household size was 2.6 and the average family size was 3.5. The percent of those with a bachelor's degree or higher was estimated to be 17.4% of the population.

18.1% of the population was under the age of 18, 7.4% from 18 to 24, 21.1% from 25 to 44, 22.5% from 45 to 64, and 31.0% who were 65 years of age or older. The median age was 48.0 years. For every 100 females, there were 106.7 males. For every 100 females ages 18 and older, there were 107.0 males.

The 2016–2020 5-year American Community Survey estimates show that the median household income was $56,875 (with a margin of error of +/- $16,750) and the median family income was $72,614 (+/- $12,318). Males had a median income of $43,750 (+/- $19,232) versus $20,391 (+/- $9,954) for females. The median income for those above 16 years old was $29,881 (+/- $2,880). Approximately, 2.1% of families and 8.4% of the population were below the poverty line, including 2.0% of those under the age of 18 and 20.9% of those ages 65 or over.

=== 2010 census ===
As of the census of 2010, there were 449 people, 169 households, and 112 families residing in the city. The population density was 1,603.6 inhabitants per square mile (619.2/km^{2}). There were 195 housing units at an average density of 696.4 per square mile (268.9/km^{2}). The racial makeup of the city was 96.7% White, 0.7% African American, 0.2% Native American, 0.4% from other races, and 2.0% from two or more races. Hispanic or Latino of any race were 4.5% of the population.

There were 169 households, of which 36.1% had children under the age of 18 living with them, 50.3% were married couples living together, 11.2% had a female householder with no husband present, 4.7% had a male householder with no wife present, and 33.7% were non-families. 29.6% of all households were made up of individuals, and 11.9% had someone living alone who was 65 years of age or older. The average household size was 2.37 and the average family size was 2.91.

The median age in the city was 43.4 years. 24.3% of residents were under the age of 18; 3.5% were between the ages of 18 and 24; 25.2% were from 25 to 44; 23.9% were from 45 to 64; and 23.2% were 65 years of age or older. The gender makeup of the city was 45.2% male and 54.8% female.

=== 2000 census ===
As of the census of 2000, there were 398 people, 167 households, and 114 families residing in the city. The population density was 1,545.7 inhabitants per square mile (596.8/km^{2}). There were 198 housing units at an average density of 769.0 per square mile (296.9/km^{2}). The racial makeup of the city was 98.74% White, 0.25% Native American, 0.50% Asian, and 0.50% from two or more races. Hispanic or Latino of any race were 0.50% of the population.

There were 167 households, out of which 29.9% had children under the age of 18 living with them, 58.1% were married couples living together, 8.4% had a female householder with no husband present, and 31.7% were non-families. 27.5% of all households were made up of individuals, and 13.8% had someone living alone who was 65 years of age or older. The average household size was 2.38 and the average family size was 2.91.

In the city, the population was spread out, with 26.4% under the age of 18, 4.8% from 18 to 24, 28.6% from 25 to 44, 18.3% from 45 to 64, and 21.9% who were 65 years of age or older. The median age was 39 years. For every 100 females, there were 96.1 males. For every 100 females age 18 and over, there were 91.5 males.

The median income for a household in the city was $31,875, and the median income for a family was $38,750. Males had a median income of $26,250 versus $20,469 for females. The per capita income for the city was $16,327. About 4.2% of families and 9.0% of the population were below the poverty line, including 9.4% of those under age 18 and 4.7% of those age 65 or over.

== Education ==
The community is served by Riley County USD 378 public school district.

== Notable people ==
- Quentin Breese (1918–1962), boxer
- Albin Longren (1882–1950), aviation pioneer
- Jordy Nelson (b. 1985), former American football player for the Green Bay Packers
