= Luscombe 8 =

Light, single engine monoplane produced 1937 - late 1940s

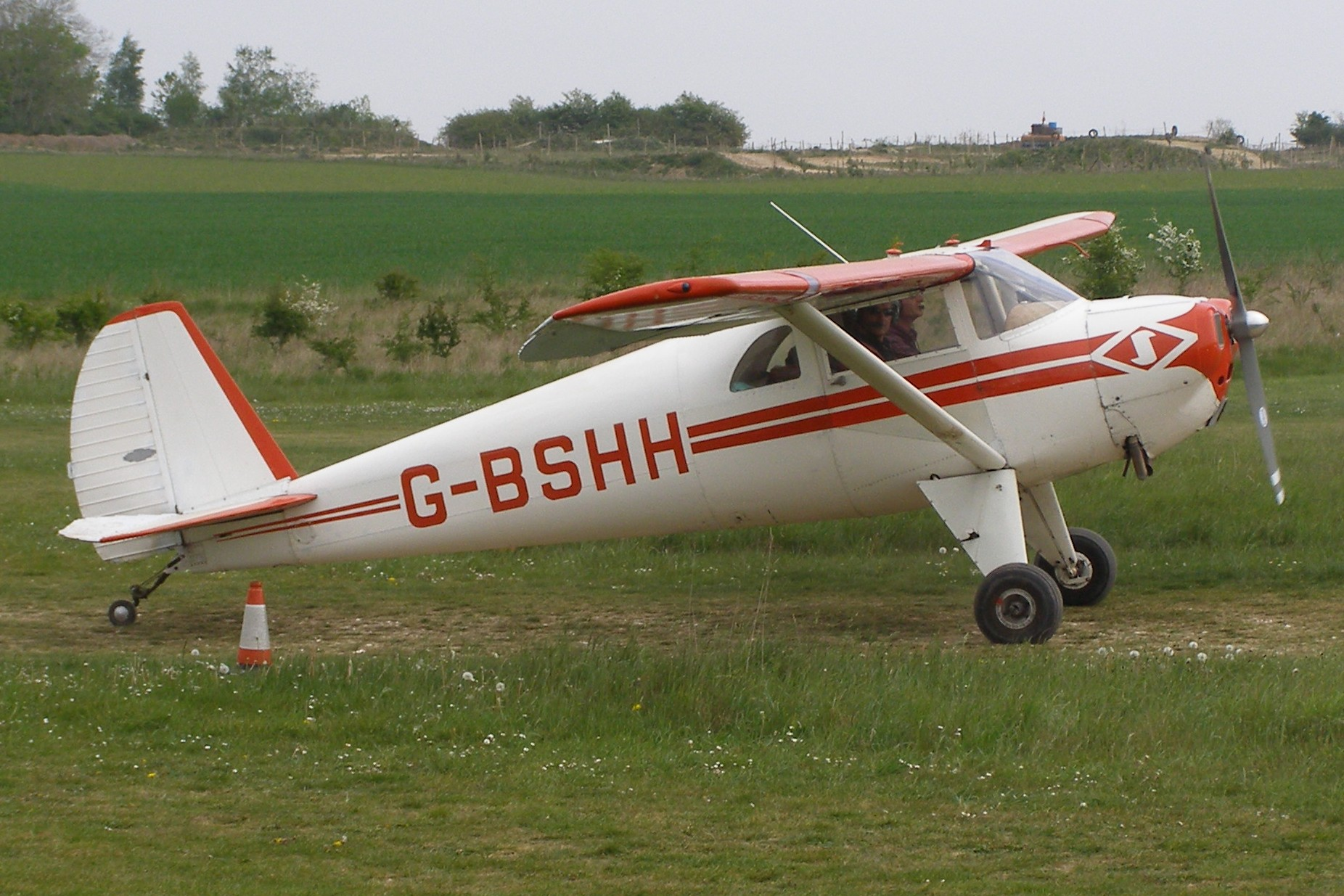
- 1946-built Luscombe 8E

General information
- Type: civilian
- Manufacturer: Luscombe Aircraft
- Designer: Donald A. Luscombe
- Number built: 5,867 (1960)

History
- Manufactured: 1937 – c. 1940s
- First flight: December 17, 1937

The Luscombe 8 is a series of high-wing, side-by-side-seating monoplanes with conventional landing gear, designed in 1937 and built by Luscombe Aircraft.

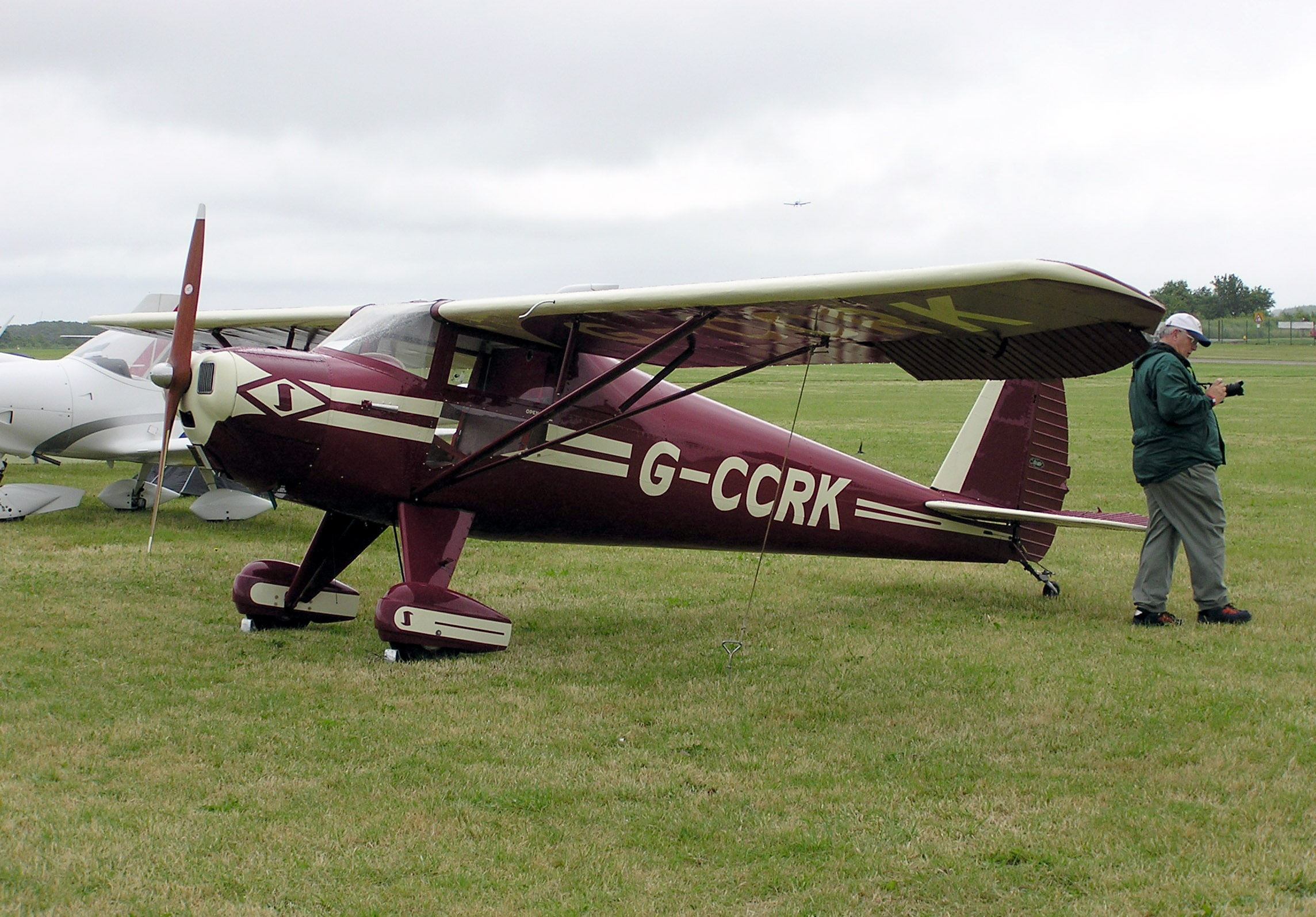
1946 Luscombe Silvaire 8A

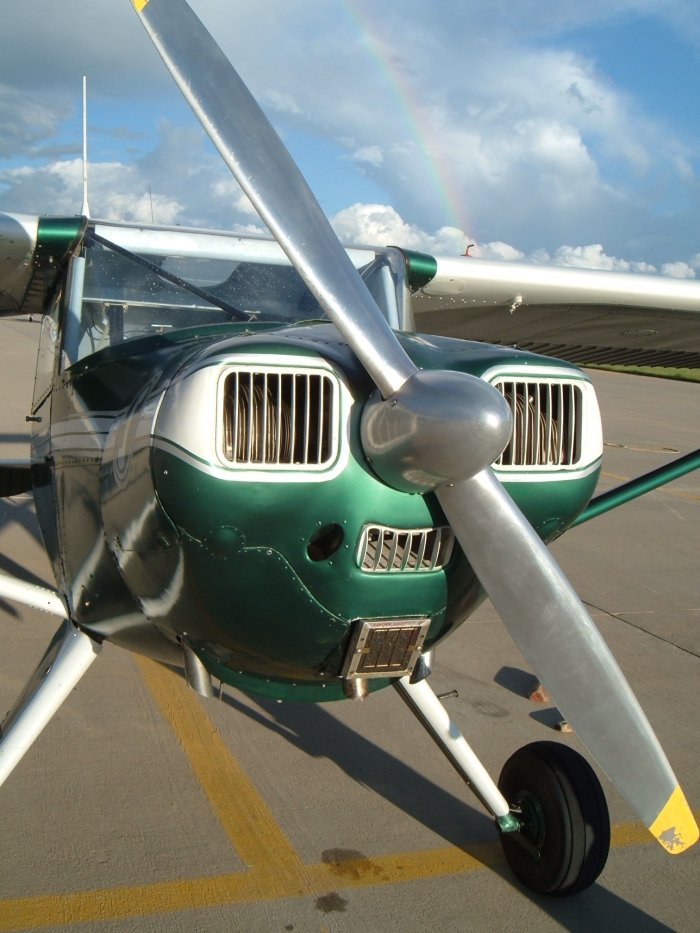
1948 Luscombe 8F Silvaire

== Development ==
The XT8E was developed in 1947 to compete for a U.S. Air Force contract, but lost to the Aeronca L-16. It was then modified and sold as the T8F. It was again entered in a competition in 1950 as the T8F-L, but lost to the Cessna L-19.

=== Subsequent companies ===
After building 5,743 Model 8 airplanes, the original Luscombe Aircraft closed in 1949, with its assets purchased by Temco Aircraft. Temco built about 50 Silvaires in Dallas, Texas, before selling the rights to the Silvaire Aircraft Corporation in 1955.

When Temco discontinued production, Otis Massey headed up a new corporation that purchased the Luscombe tooling, parts, and other assets. Massey had been a Luscombe dealer since the 1930s. His new venture opened in Fort Collins, Colorado as Silvaire Uranium and Aircraft Corp (later renamed Silvaire Aircraft Corp). From 1956 to 1961, this firm produced 80 aircraft. The make and model for all 80 was Silvaire 8F, with "Luscombe" shown in quotation marks in company literature.

The Colorado firm's first airplane was built in 1956. This aircraft was constructed from spares or Material Review Board (MRB) parts that were serviceable but remained from Temco's prior production. The Temco parts supplied Silvaire Aircraft Corp. with enough inventory to complete approximately four aircraft. N9900C (equipped with wheel pants and flaps) first flew on September 10, 1956. According to Swick, one other airplane was built in 1956. Six aircraft were built in 1957, with two of them being shipped to Buenos Aires, Argentina.

After building eighty airplanes, the Silvaire Aircraft Company closed down. The last airplane was completed on May 17, 1960.

Moody Larsen of Belleville, Michigan acquired the tooling, parts, and type certificate on December 6, 1963. In 1965 Larsen developed and acquired a supplemental type certificate to install 150 hp Lycoming engines in existing Luscombe 8s. In 1968 Larsen sold his Luscombe intellectual interests to a Georgia group which incorporated as the Luscombe Aircraft Corporation. The tooling remained, exposed to the weather, in Michigan.

The assets, including parts, tools, jigs, and the FAA-type certificate (A-694) of the legacy Luscombe companies, were acquired by Testrake Aviation in 2019. The company intended to restart production of the Luscombe 8.

== Variants ==
Model 8
Initial variant with a 50 hp (37 kW) Continental A-50 engine.

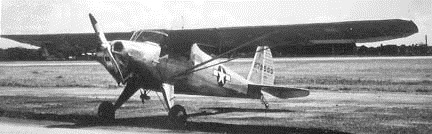
The UC-90

Model 8A Luscombe Master
Model 8 with a higher power 65 hp (48 kW) Continental A-65 engine.
UC-90A
One Model 8A adopted by the United States Army Air Forces during World War II (s/n 42-79549).
Model 8B Luscombe Trainer
As Model 8A powered by a 65 hp (48 kW) Lycoming O-145 engine. One impressed by the United States Army Air Forces during World War II as UC-90 (s/n 42-79550).
Model 8C Silvaire Deluxe
As Model 8A powered by a 75 hp (56 kW) Continental A-75 engine.
Model 8D Silvaire Deluxe Trainer
As Model 8A with steerable tailwheel and other minor changes.
Model 8E Silvaire Deluxe
An improved Model 8C with increased gross weight and powered by an 85 hp (63 kW) Continental C-85 engine.
Model 8F
High-performance variant with a 90 hp (67 kW) Continental C-90 engine. Some 8Fs were built with manually operated wing flaps.
Model T8F Luscombe Observer
A tandem two-seat variant of the 8F for observation duties.
Model 8G
Was a proposed variant of the 8F with a tricycle landing gear, not built.
Luscombe LSA-8
Model for the US light-sport aircraft category, produced by the Luscombe Silvaire Company of Riverside, California and introduced at Sun 'n Fun 2007. The LSA-8 is powered by a Continental O-200 engine of 100 hp (75 kW). The design is a Federal Aviation Administration accepted special light-sport aircraft.
Dair 100 testbed
One Luscombe 8A was equipped with a Dair 100 two-stroke diesel engine as a testbed aircraft.

== Specifications (Silvaire 8-F) ==
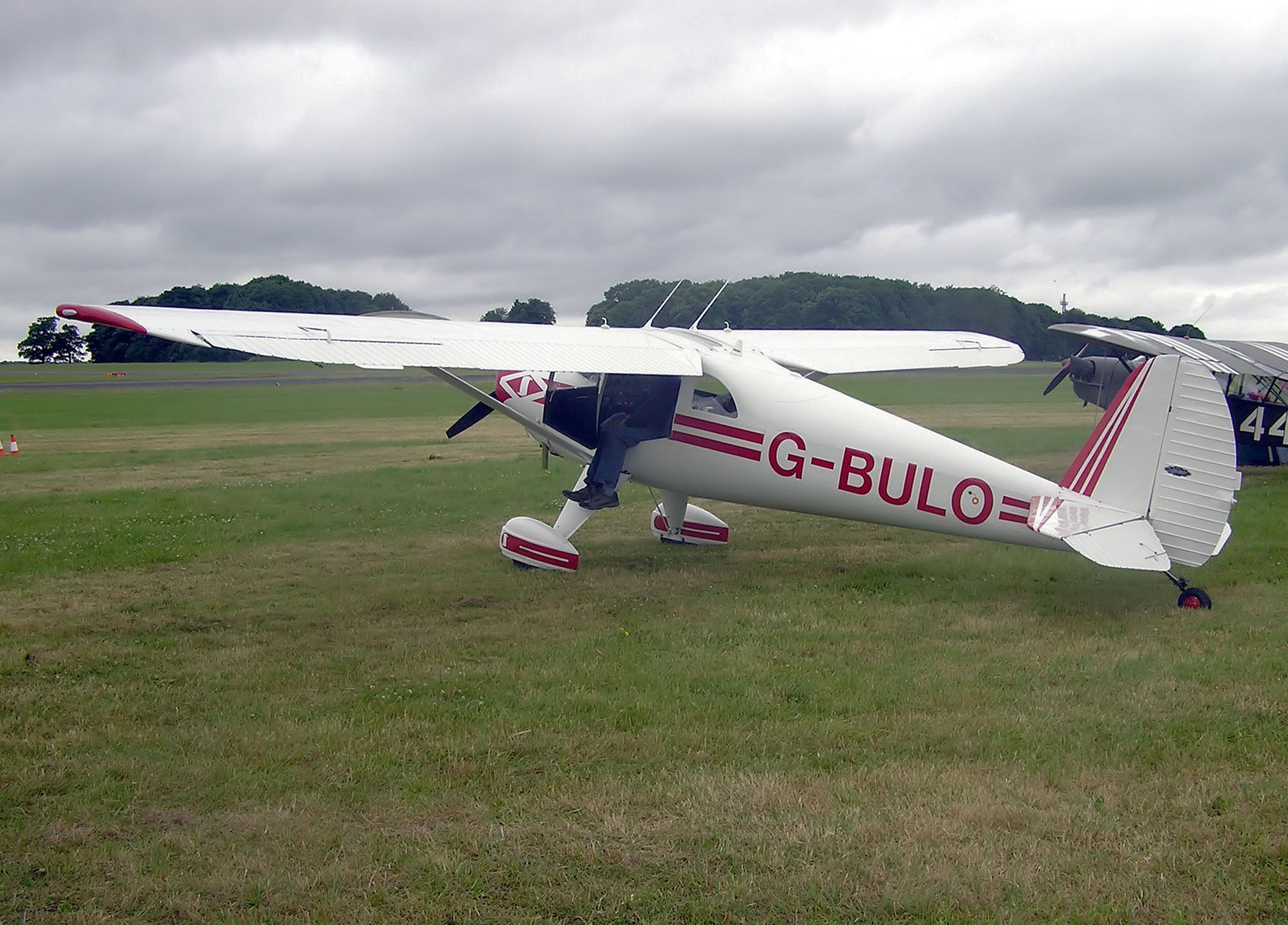
1946 Luscombe Silvaire 8F

Data from Jane's All The World's Aircraft 1961–62

General characteristics

- Crew: one
- Capacity: one passenger
- Length: 20 ft 0 in (6.10 m)
- Wingspan: 35 ft 0 in (10.67 m)
- Height: 6 ft 3 in (1.91 m)
- Wing area: 140 sq ft (13 m^{2})
- Empty weight: 870 lb (395 kg)
- Gross weight: 1,400 lb (635 kg)
- Fuel capacity: 25 US Gallons (95 L)
- Powerplant: 1 × Continental C90 air-cooled flat four, 90 hp (67 kW)
- Propellers: 2-bladed metal fixed pitch, 5 ft 11 in (1.80 m) diameter

Performance

- Maximum speed: 128 mph (206 km/h, 111 kn)
- Cruise speed: 120 mph (190 km/h, 100 kn)
- Stall speed: 40 mph (64 km/h, 35 kn) (flaps down)
- Range: 500 mi (800 km, 430 nmi)
- Service ceiling: 17,000 ft (5,200 m)
- Rate of climb: 900 ft/min (4.6 m/s)

Sub-Model T8F has tandem seating but is generally similar in dimension, Sprayer version approved for Restricted category operations can have higher Gross Weight with operational limits.

== See also ==
Aircraft of comparable role, configuration, and era

- Aeronca 11 Chief
- Aeronca 50 Chief
- Cessna 120 and 140
- Ercoupe
- Piper J-4
- Taylorcraft B
