= List of STAé specifications =

The following lists the known aircraft specifications (spec.) drawn up by the Service technique de l'aéronautique (STAé), which were tendered to competitively by French aircraft manufacturers. Similar specifications were drawn up for aircraft equipment, aircraft armament and aircraft engines. Military aircraft to STAé specifications usually incorporated the spec. title in the designation, such as: Potez XV HO.2 Data from:

== 1919 ==
C.1 - single-seat, high altitude
240 km/h (150 mph; 130 kn) at 7,000 m (23,000 ft), ceiling 9,000 m (30,000 ft), endurance 2 hours 30 minutes Armament:2x forward-firing Vickers machine-guns.
C.1 - single-seat, medium altitude
270 km/h (170 mph; 150 kn) at 4,000 m (13,000 ft), ceiling 6,500 m (21,300 ft), endurance 2 hours 30 minutes Armament:2x forward-firing Vickers machine-guns.
BP.3 - heavy high-altitude bomber
Latécoère 6 (no other contenders are known).
B.3 - three seat day bomber
Caudron C.26, (no other contenders are known)
CAP.2 - two seat close support fighter
(CAP - Chasse Armee Protection) 200 km/h (120 mph; 110 kn) at 7,000 m (23,000 ft), ceiling 8,500 m (27,900 ft), endurance 2 hours 30 minutes. 2x forward-firing Vickers machine-guns and 2x ring-mounted Lewis machine-guns. Gourdou-Leseurre GL-50, Potez XI, Hanriot HD.15
CAN.2 - two seat night fighter
( CAN - Chasse Armee Nuit) 190 km/h (120 mph; 100 kn) at 3,000 m (9,800 ft), ceiling 5,000 m (16,000 ft), endurance 2 hours 30 minutes. 2x forward-firing Vickers machine-guns and 2x ring-mounted Lewis machine-guns. Gourdou-Leseurre GL-51, Lioré et Olivier LeO-8 CAN.2
HB.2 - two seat bomber flying boat
Levy-Besson HB.2, Romano R.1
HR.3 - three seat reconnaissance seaplane
Besson ?, Denhaut-Bellanger ?
HE.2 - two seat trainer seaplane
Besson ?

== 1920 ==
BP.2 - two seat high-altitude bomber
Dewoitine D.2, SPAD S.36
To.3 - three seat Police Colonial
Hanriot HD.18, Potez XA, Breguet 14TOE
BN.2 - two seat night bomber
Dewoitine D.4, Wibault Wib.2, Amiot 100 (Amiot-X), Caudron C.53
A.2 - two seat observation and attack aircraft
Dewoitine D.5, Farman F.110, Caudron C.55, SPAD S.39
A.3 - three seat observation and attack aircraft
Caudron C.34, Blériot 108
B.3 - three seat day bomber
Caudron C.34 (also)
BN.4 - four seat night bomber
Blériot 76

== 1921 ==
BN.4 - four seat night bomber
Latécoère 4, Latécoère 5, Schneider Henri-Paul, Breguet 21, Farman?
M - marine reconnaissance aircraft
Nieuport NiD-33M (no other contenders are known)
Torpedo reconnaissance bomber
Levasseur PL.2, Dewoitine D.6, Farman-Blanchard design?
BP.2 - two seat high altitude bomber
Latécoère 7 (no other contenders are known)
HB.5 - long range maritime flying boat
Latham HB.5
AT-1/2 - single/two seat torpedo bomber
Levasseur PL.2, SPAD-39, Hanriot? and Nieuport?
HMT.3 - three seat amphibian flying boat
FBA 13, FBA 19 HMT.3
Transport and airliner aircraft
Breguet XX, Caudron C.74, Farman F.90, Mureaux Mo.10, Potez X

== 1922 ==
HC.I - single seat marine fighter
CAMS 31, Blériot 101, Besson MB.21
To.2 - two seat Colonial
Hanriot HD.24, Latécoère 11, Caudron C.45
B.2 - two seat day bomber
Farman design
Flying boat racer
Latham L.1 Latham L.2, CAMS 36bis, CAMS 38, Blanchard BB-1, Blanchard BB-2
HE.2 - two seat trainer flying boat
CAMS 30E, FBA-14, FBA-16, FBA-17HE.2

== 1923 ==
C.1 - single seat fighter
Buscalet-Bechereau BB-2, Dewoitine D.9, Dewoitine D.12, Dewoitine D.13, Dewoitine D.15, Dewoitine D.19, Dewoitine D.21, Hanriot HD.31, Loire-Gourdou et Leseurre LGL.32, Nieuport Ni.42, Nieuport Ni.44, Nieuport Ni.46, Breguet 24, Wibault Wib.7, Wibault Wib.9, Bernard 12, Bernard 14, Bernard 15, SPAD S-511, SPAD S-512, SPAD S-514, SPAD S-611, SPAD S-612, SPAD S-613, SPAD S-614, SPAD S-615, Potez 23, Potez 26, Gourdou et Leseurre GL.33
A.2 - two seat observation aircraft
Temper T.4, Descamps DB-16, Potez 24, Potez 26, Wibault Wib.10, Blériot 108, Farman ?
R.3 - three seat reconnaissance seaplane
Levasseur PL.4, Nieuport Ni.35, Besson MB.24, Besson MB.26, Percheron DP-18, CAMS 32R, CAMS 35, H-10
BN.2 - two seat night bomber
Dewoitine D.16, -12, Potez 19, Farman F.60, Latécoère 19, Latécoère 6, CPA-1, Lioré et Olivier LeO-7, Blériot 103, Blériot 107, Blériot 117, Schneider 10M, Wibault Wib.4(maybe)
HB.3 - three seat reconnaissance/multi-role flying boat
CAMS 33, CAMS 41, H-13, Latham C-1, FBA-21, Denhaut-Bellanger BD-22, Blanchard Brd.1, Blanchard-Blériot C.1, Besson MB.27?
EP.2 - two seat primary trainer
Blériot-SPAD S-64, Hanriot HD.14, Morane-Saulnier MS.35, Caudron C.27, Amiot (SECM) Model-26, Potez VIII, Farman Sport
ET.1 - single seat basic trainer
Nieuport NiD-29, Caudron C.77
AM.3 - three seat reconnaissance seaplane
Levasseur PL.3, Nieuport NiD-39
Transport and airliner aircraft
Farman F.3X, Farman F.4S, Buscaylet de Monge 7/2, Potez XXII, Caudron C.83, Breguet XXII, Blériot 115, Blériot ?
TO.2/3 - two/three seat torpedo bomber seaplane
CAMS 44

== 1924 ==
AMBC.2 - two seat carrier based fighter
Villiers Vil.2, Levasseur PL.5, Nieuport NiD-43, Blériot 118
AMC.1 - single seat carrier based fighter
Levy-Biche LB.2, Mureaux Express Marin
A.3/R.3b - three seat observation and gunnery spotter aircraft
Levasseur PL.4, Hanriot A.3?
B.3 - three seat day bomber
Potez 20 (P.XX), Farman F.150 and Desmons two designs
ET.2 - two seat basic trainer
Hanriot HD.32, Caudron Morane-Saulnier MS.43, Caudron Caudron C.95, Caudron Farman F.81
HB.2 - 2-seat bomber
(Hydravion de Bombardement) FBA 19 HB.2
HMB.2 - 2-seat amphibian bomber
(Hydravion Mixte de Bombardement) FBA 19 HMB.2

== 1925 ==
R.3 - three seat reconnaissance aircraft
Villiers Vil.4, Caudron C.101, Caudron C,103, Caudron C.104, Caudron C.107, Potez 25, Potez 33, Descamps DB-17, Wibault Wib.123
AMBC.1 - single seat carrier based fighter
Villiers Vil.8, Levy-Biche LB.2, Salmson-Bechereau SB-7, Nieuport NiD.51 (maybe)
C.2 - two seat fighter
Breguet 25, SPAD S-60, SPAD S-70, De Monge M-101, Dewoitine D.25, Levasseur PL.6, Potez 31, Salmson-Bechereau SB-5, Salmson-Bechereau SB-6, Nieuport Ni.47, Avimeta Avi.88, ANF-3, ANF-4, Wibault Wib.8, Wibault Wib.12, Wibault Wib.121, Hanriot HD.33, Villiers Vil.24, Descamps D17
B.2/CN.2 - two seat night fighter and reconnaissance aircraft
Breguet 19 B2/CN2, De Monge 8-1
BN.4 - four seat night bomber
Blériot 113

== 1926 ==
C.1 - single seat fighter
Amiot 110, Bernard-20, Dewoitine D.27, Gourdou-Leseurre GL-341, Gourdou-Leseurre GL-351, Morane-Saulnier MS.121, MS.221, Nieuport NiD-48, Nieuport NiD-49, Nieuport NiD-72, Nieuport NiD-82, SPAD S.91, SPAD S.91-1, SPAD S.91-2, Wibault Wib.13, Wibault Wib.15, Wibault Wib.160, Wibault Wib.170, De Monge 9-1
BN.3 - three seat night bomber
Farman F.123, Farman F.130, Farman F.160, Lioré et Olivier LeO-20, Latécoère 19, Blériot 123, Dyle et Bacalan DB-10, Amiot 122, Blériot 113, Potez 35 maybe, Couzinet ?
HBA.2 - observation and reconnaissance catapult aircraft
Latham-230, Besson MB.35, Levy-Biche LB-4, Gourdou-Leseurre L2, Romano R.4, FBA-17HL-1, Villiers Vil.11, CAMS 37, Percheron DP-?
Heavy seaplane torpedo bomber
CAMS 44, Lioré et Olivier LeO H-151, Dyle et Bacalan DB-11, Desmons design

== 1927 ==
B.3 - three seat day bomber
Farman F.172
HB.3 - three seat reconnaissance seaplane/flying boat
CAMS 55, Hanriot H.38, SPCA-10, Latham 45, Latham 47, Latham 49, Denhaut Hy.479

== 1928 ==
C.1 - single seat lightweight fighter
Dewoitine D.27, Dewoitine D.32, Morane-Saulnier MS.222, Morane-Saulnier MS.223, SPAD S.911, SPAD S.210, SPAD S.310, SPAD S.410, Bernard 70, Nieuport NiD-72, Gourdou-Leseurre GL-410, Gourdou-Leseurre GL-450, Loire 40, Loire 41, Loire 42, Wibault Wib.130, Wibault Wib.210, Wibault Wib.270
M.4 - multi seat combat aircraft
Amiot-140, Blériot 137, Breguet 410, Breguet 411, Breguet 412, Breguet 413, SPCA-30, Dyle et Bacalan DB-20, Nieuport NiD-53M, Avimeta-120
A.2 - two seat reconnaissance aircraft
Breguet 270, Potez 390, Dyle et Bacalan DB-30, Caudron C.140, Weymann Wel-10, ANF-Mureaux-130, Latécoère 490, Amiot-130, Nieuport NiD-580, Wibault Wib.124, Wibault Wib.125
HB.4 - four seat reconnaissance/bomber seaplane
Latécoère 290, Latécoère 430, Latécoère 440, Nieuport NiD-50, Besson MB-30, SPCA-20, Lioré et Olivier LeO H-16, Lioré et Olivier LeO H-257, CAMS 52, Dyle et Bacalan DB-40, Villiers Vil.26, FBA-?, Latécoère ?
HR.3 - three seat reconnaissance seaplane
Lioré et Olivier LeO H-23, CAMS 80, Amiot-110, Romano R-5, CAMS 37/9, Loire-50, Latécoère 410
RN.3 - three seat night reconnaissance aircraft
ANF-Mureaux-120, De Monge M-120, Loire-20, Loire-30, Wibault Wib.220, Weymann Wel-70, Breguet 320, Breguet 321
Multi engines transport aircraft
Farman F.300, Latécoère 350, Wibault Wib.280, Wibault Wib.281, Bernard-60T
Transatlantic South seaplane
Blériot 5190, Latécoère 38, Latécoère 300, Latécoère 500, H-27, SPCA Neptune

== 1929 ==
C.1 - ultra light single seat fighter
SPAD S-210, SPAD S-310, Loire-40, Bernard 70, Bernard 73, Bernard 74, Bernard 75, Dewoitine D.37, Dewoitine D.38
HB.4 - four seat reconnaissance/bomber seaplane
Nieuport NiD-600, Lioré et Olivier LeO H-258
Postal - postal aircraft
Nieuport NiD-740, Blériot 110, Couzinet 28, Couzinet 29, Couzinet 30, SPCA-40T, Bloch-60, Blériot 195/2, Dewoitine D.29, ANF-Mureaux-140T, Albert A.20, Blériot BZ-4, Guerchais T.6, Breguet 380
EP.2 - two seat military trainer aircraft
Caudron C.251, Albert A.70, Dewoitine D.48, Lorraine-Hanriot LH-30, SPAD-540, Morane-Saulnier MS.330, Morane-Saulnier 331
BN.4/5 - four seat night bomber
Lioré et Olivier LeO-25, Breguet 360, Dyle et Bacalan DB-75

== 1930 ==
C.1 - single seat fighter
ANF-Mureaux-170, Bernard 260, Bernard 261, Bernard 262, Dewoitine D.370, Dewoitine D.500, Dewoitine D.47, Dewoitine D.49, Dewoitine D.50, Dewoitine D.51, Dewoitine D.52, Gourdou-Leseurre GL-480, Gourdou-Leseurre GL-481, Gourdou-Leseurre GL-482, Gourdou-Leseurre GL-422, Kellner-Bechereau KB.29, Latécoère 510, Loire 41, Loire 42, Loire 43, Loire 44, Morane-Saulnier MS.224, Morane-Saulnier MS.225, Morane-Saulnier MS.275, Morane-Saulnier MS.320, Morane-Saulnier MS.325, Morane-Saulnier MS.420, Morane-Saulnier MS.520, Farman F-1020, Nieuport NiD-82, Nieuport NiD-120, Nieuport NiD-121, Nieuport NiD-122, SPAD S-510, Virmoux V.1, Virmoux V.2, Wibault Wib.310, Wibault Wib.311, Wibault Wib.312, Wibault Wib.313
Seaplane postal transport
Latécoère 380, Latécoère 381, Villiers Vil.320, SPCA-50, Lioré et Olivier LeO H-27, Breguet Calcutta
Police colonial aircraft
Nieuport NiD-590, Nieuport NiD-690, Dewoitine D.430, SPCA-81, Bernard 160, Bernard 161, Loire 11, Loire 20, Potez 40, Romano R.16, Lorraine-Hanriot LH-70 (SAB), Bloch MB.120, Weymann-40, Farman F.196, Caudron C.180, SPCA-90
Two seat observation catapult-launch seaplane
Besson MB.41, CAMS 90, Potez 450, Levasseur PL.11, Levasseur PL.12, Gourdou-Leseurre GL-830, Gourdou-Leseurre GL-831, Bodiansky-30. Romano R.?, FBA.?
Transport seaplane
Gourdou-Leseurre GL-710, Farman F.310, CAMS 58, Latécoère 501, SPCA-60, Lioré et Olivier LeO H-24, Wibault Wib.240, Blériot 250 (maybe))
A.2 - two seat reconnaissance aircraft
ANF-Mureauz-110, Latécoère 490, Latécoère 491, Weymann-80, Breguet 330, Lorraine-Hanriot LH-15, Wibault Wib.260, Potez 37
TOR.2/3 - two/three-seat torpedo bomber seaplane
CAMS 60, Farman F.210, Denhaut design
Long range maritime flying boat or seaplane
Latécoère 520, Latécoère 521, Dewoitine HD.46

== 1931 ==
Ambulance light aircraft
Bloch Bl-80, Lorraine-Hanriot LH-21S, Potez 42
Long range flying boat
Loire-70, CAMS E32, Latécoère 580, Breguet 520, Lioré et Olivier LeO H-42, Latham 43, Latham 47
Patrol maritime flying boat
CAMS 110
B.5 - five-seat day bomber aircraft
Blériot 270, Bordelaise AB.15
BN.3 - three-seat night bomber
Blériot 230

== 1932 ==
C.1 - single-seat fighter
Blériot-SPAD S-510, Bernard 260, Bernard 261, Bernard 262, Dewoitine D.370, Dewoitine D.500, Lorraine-Hanriot 110, Morane-Saulnier MS.224, Morane-Saulnier MS.225, Morane-Saulnier MS.275, Morane-Saulnier MS.320, Morane-Saulnier MS.325, Morane-Saulnier MS.420, Morane-Saulnier MS.520, Nieuport NiD-82, Nieuport NiD-120, Nieuport NiD-121, Nieuport NiD-122, Loire 43, ANF-Mureaux 170, Gourdou-Leseurre GL-480, Gourdou-Leseurre GL-481, Gourdou-Leseurre GL-482, Gourdou-Leseurre GL-422
Light transport and tourist aircraft
Nieuport NiD-84, Farman F.230, Caudron C.193, Caudron C.232, Guilemin JG.10, Blériot 152, Latécoère 470, Dewoitine D.36, Dewoitine D.57, Gerin V.2
BN.5 - five-seat heavy bomber aircraft
Lioré et Olivier LeO-300, Lioré et Olivier LeO-301, Couzinet 63, Couzinet 70, Couzinet 90, Couzinet 91, Breguet 580, Amiot 180, Potez 41M, SAB AB.20, SAB AB.21, Farman F.221, Bloch MB.200, Bloch MB.210, Latécoère 530, Blériot 227, Morane-Saulnier MS.270, Amiot 143
Civil and tourist amphibian
Romano R-15, Blériot 290, Loire 50, FBA-310, Caudron PV.200
TO.3 - three-engined colonial aircraft
Bloch MB.70, Weymann CTW-66
ET.2 - two-seat primary trainer aircraft
Romano R.80, SEMA 10

== 1933 ==
Bomber and reconnaissance seaplane
Latécoère 550, SPCA-20, CAMS 60, Bernard-340, Farman F.311, SAB AB.21
M5 - five seat multi-place combat aircraft
Farman F.420, Breguet 460, Amiot 144, Dewoitine D.420, Bloch-130, Potez 540, Potez 541, SAB AB.80
A.3 - three seat reconnaissance aircraft
Weymann CTW-100, Breguet 23/230, Dyle et Bacalan DB-50
Three seat reconnaissance catapult launch seaplane
CAMS 120, Breguet 610, Loire-130, SPAD S.610, Levasseur PL.200, Gourdou-Leseurre GL-820, Lioré et Olivier LeO H-43
Transport aircraft for Air France
Dewoitine D.620, Bloch MB.300, Romano R.100

( also Wibault Wib.330, Breguet 440, Amiot-160, Amiot-170 maybe)

Single seat fighter seaplane
Bernard H.110, Potez 453, Loire-210, Romano R.90

== 1934 ==
C.1 - single seat fighter
SPAD S.710, Morane-Saulnier MS.405, Nieuport N.160, Nieuport N.161, Dewoitine D.513, Loire-250, Bloch MB.150, Caudron-Renault CR.710, ANF-Mureaux-190, Arsenal VG.30
C.2/C.3/CN.2 - two/three seat fighter and two seat night fighter
Romano R.110, Hanriot H.220, Potez 630, Potez 631, Breguet 690, Loire-Nieuport LN-20, Caudron CR.670, Caudron C.730, Caudron CR.810, Payen Pa.320, Pa.321AC, Dewoitine D.600, Dewoitine .601, Dewoitine D.630, Dewoitine D.631, Lioré et Olivier LeO-50
B.4 - four seat bomber aircraft
Breguet 580, Dewoitine D.331, Dewoitine D.337, Blériot 370, Amiot 340, Amiot 341, Farman F.440, Latecoere Lat.570, Breguet 462, Bloch MB.133, Bloch MB.134, Bernard SAB.90, Bernard SAB.170, Lioré et Olivier LeO-45, Dewoitine D.660, Breguet-Wibault-660, Romano R.120, Breguet 480, Breguet 481, Breguet 482
Transatlantic flying boat aircraft
Breguet 680, Loire-100, Loire-101, Loire-102, Lioré et Olivier LeO H-47, CAMS 100, CAMS 150, Dewoitine HD.700
Military transport aircraft
Dewoitine D.339, Couzinet-170, Potez 65, Caudron CR.570

== 1935 ==
Long range maritime flying boat
Breguet 710, Breguet 720, Breguet 730, Potez-CAMS 141, Latécoère 610, Latécoère 611, Lioré et Olivier LeO H-440
Torpedo bomber seaplane
Lioré et Olivier LeO H-46, Amiot-150, Farman F.410, Loire-240 (later became Loire-Nieuport LN-10), Bloch MB.480
Two seat combat and light bomber
Dewoitine design?
Transport seaplane
Lioré et Olivier LeO H-246, Loire-102M
B.5 - five seat bomber
Potez B5

== 1936 ==
C.1 - single seat lightweight fighter
Bloch-700, Caudron C.713, Arsenal VG.33, Aubert PA-70, ANF-Mureaux-190, Potez 230, Payen Pa.112
Long range transatlantic flying boat
Latécoère 631, Potez-CAMS 161, SNCASE SE.200, Delanne DL-70
Trainer and tourist aircraft
Potez 60, Farman F.451, Farman F.480, Salmson D.6 Cri-Cri, Caudron C.275, Mauboussin M.112, Mauboussin M.120, SFCA Peryet Taupin, Avia XIA, Avia XVA, Avia 111, Avia 151, Leopoldoff?
T.3 - army co-operation and trainer aircraft
Potez 220, Potez 566, Potez 63/11, Potez 63/14 7, Potez 63/15, Hanriot H.240, SNCAC NC.510, SNCAC NC.511, SNCAC NC.512, SNCAC NC.530, SNCAC NC.540, SNCAC NC.550, SNCAO CAO-400, Dewoitine D.670, Dewoitine D.671, Dewoitine D.700, Dewoitine D.720, Dewoitine D.721, Caudron CR.830, Bloch MB.171, Bloch MB.500, Bloch MB.800, Caproni Ca.313

== 1937 ==
C.1 - single seat fighter
Morane-Saulnier MS.450, SNCAO-200, Dewoitine D.520, Arsenal VG.33, Bloch MB.151, Bloch MB.152, Roussel R-30, Payen Pa.110C, Caudron CR.760, Caudron CR.770, Caudron CR.780, Bloch-700, Potez 230, Payen Pa.112
C.3/C.2 - two/three seat fighter
Potez 670, Potez 671, Hanriot (SNCAC) NC.600, SNCASE SE.100, SNCASE SE.101, SNCASE SE.102, Breguet 700, Caudron C.900, Payen Pa.310CB, Payen Pa.323AC, Delanne DL-120, Wibault twin engined fighter, CAPRA-40
A-75 - single seat seaplane fighter
Potez-CAMS 170, SNCAO-500, Dewoitine (SNCAM) HD.780, Latécoère 670, Latécoère 671, Latécoère 672, Latécoère 673, Latécoère 674
AB.2/3 - two/three seat attack bomber aircraft
Bloch MB.170, Goudrou G.50, Breguet 691, Breguet 693, Breguet 695, (SNCAM) Dewoitine HD.770, Dewoitine HD.771, Dewoitine HD.772 (SNCAM), Caudron CR.850
High altitude bomber aircraft
Dewoitine D.600, Dewoitine D.601, Dewoitine D.610, Dewoitine D.611
B.5 - five seat heavy bomber aircraft
SNCAO CAO-700, SNCAO CAO-710, Bloch MB.162, Bloch MB.163, Potez 660, Amiot-380, SNCAC NC.110, Couzinet AC.20, Couzinet AC.21, Breguet 482, Dewoitine D.800
Light catapult launch observation aircraft
Breguet 800, Dewoitine (SNCAM) HD.730, Gourdou G.120
Torpedo bomber and reconnaissance seaplane
SNCAO CAO-600, Dewoitine (SNCAM) HD.750, Latécoère 299
HE.2/3 - two/three seat trainer seaplane
FBA-350, Potez SNCAN-180, Minie-Cassin MR.10, Breguet 790, Dewoitine (SNCAM) HD.740, SNCAO CAO.30, SNCASE SE.400

== 1938 ==
B.4 - four seat medium bomber
Amiot-400, SNCAC NC.150, Delanne DL.150, Delanne DL.151
Ent.2 - two seat primary trainer aircraft
Caudron-Renault CR.870, Dewoitine (SNCAM) D.580
Three seat shipboard reconnaissance flying boat or seaplane
SNCAC NC.420, Breguet 792, Gourdou G.130
A.3 - three seat observation aircraft
Caudron C.820

== 1939 ==
C.1 - single seat fighter
Bloch MB.157, Bloch MB.1010, Bloch MB.1011, SNCAM D.550, SNCAM D.551, SNCAM D.552, Breguet 820, Arsenal VG.39, Arsenal VG.40, Arsenal VB.10, Morane-Saulnier MS.460, Caudron C.910
C.2 - two seat fighter
Delanne DL.10, Bloch MB.1040
Liaison and artillery light aircraft
Gourdou G.490, Levasseur PL.400, SFAN-11, Caudron-Renault CR.880, Morane-Saulnier MS.500, Morane-Saulnier MS.501, Morane-Saulnier MS.502, Morane-Saulnier MS.503, Morane-Saulnier MS.504, Morane-Saulnier MS.MS.505

== 1940 ==
C.3 - three seat fighter aircraft
Caudron C.810
Two-seat trainer seaplane
SCAN Project, maybe SCAN-10.

== 1941 ==
Trainer flying boat and seaplane
Breguet 860
Postal and transport aircraft
Caudron C-940, Air-Couzinet AC-103
