= Dewoitine D.15 =

D.15

General information
- Type: Single seat fighter aircraft
- National origin: France
- Manufacturer: Dewoitine
- Number built: 1

History
- First flight: 13 August 1924

The Dewoitine D.15 was a single-engine, single-seat biplane fighter aircraft built in France in the 1920s. Intended to offer structural simplifications when compared with monoplanes, it had a disappointing performance and was soon abandoned.

== Design and development ==
In a long series of single-engine fighters built by Dewoitine from the D.1 of 1922 to the 1940 D.521, the Dewoitine D.15 was the only biplane. An attempt to design a competitive but structurally less complicated machine, it was a single bay biplane with wings of unequal span mounted without stagger, braced by pairs of outward sloping parallel interplane struts, cross wire bracing and N form cabane struts. Ailerons were fitted only on the longer, upper wing. In plan the unswept wings had constant chord and straight edges, ending in angled tips. They were metal structures, entirely fabric covered. The D.15's tailplane, mounted on top of the fuselage was similar in plan and structure to the wing. The fin and rudder were triangular; the latter, mounted on a rudder post only just ahead of the tailplane trailing edge, extended down to the keel.

The D.15's flat-sided fuselage had steel longerons and Duralumin tube cross members; the sides were fabric covered but the curved ventral and dorsal decking was metal. The front of its single seat open cockpit was at the wing trailing edge, though there was a small wing cut-out to assist his forward and upper vision. The fighter was powered by an upright 335 kW (449 hp) Hispano-Suiza 12Ha liquid-cooled V-12 engine, driving a two-blade propeller. It had a fixed conventional undercarriage with a single axle enclosed within a wing-like fairing which was mounted on to the fuselage with forward, near vertical shock absorbing legs, torsionally strengthened by sloping, rearward struts. There was a tailskid. Two 7.7 mm (0.303 in) synchronised Vickers machine guns mounted on the fuselage fired through the propeller arc and two 7.5 mm (0.295 in) Darne machine guns were placed on the upper wing centre-section, firing over the propeller.

The D.15 first flew on 13 August 1924 and demonstrated a lack of both lateral (yaw) and longitudinal (pitch) stability. After modification it went for tests at Villacoublay with the Commission des Essais Pratiques de l'Aviation (Commission for Trials of Aircraft Practices) for tests. These showed that the D.15 had a poorer performance than the Dewoitine D.19, a parasol-wing aircraft, despite the latter's lower power. Accordingly, the D.19 was not submitted to the Service Technique de l'Aéronautique (Technical Section of Aeronautics) 1923 fighter programme's tests, held in 1925–26.

== Specifications ==
Data from Green and Swanborough p.176

General characteristics

- Crew: One
- Length: 7.40 m (24 ft 3 in)
- Wingspan: 12.00 m (39 ft 4 in)
- Height: 3.54 m (11 ft 7 in)
- Wing area: 30.00 m^{2} (322.9 sq ft)
- Empty weight: 1,040 kg (2,293 lb)
- Gross weight: 1,535 kg (3,384 lb)
- Powerplant: 1 × Hispano-Suiza 12Ha water-cooled upright V-12, 340 kW (450 hp)
- Propellers: 2-bladed

Armament

- Guns: 2 × 7.7 mm (0.303 in) synchronised Vickers machine gun on fuselage, firing through propeller arc and 2 × 7.5 mm (0.295 in) Darne machine guns on upper wing centre section.
