= Hanriot HD.15 =

1920s French fighter aircraft

HD.15
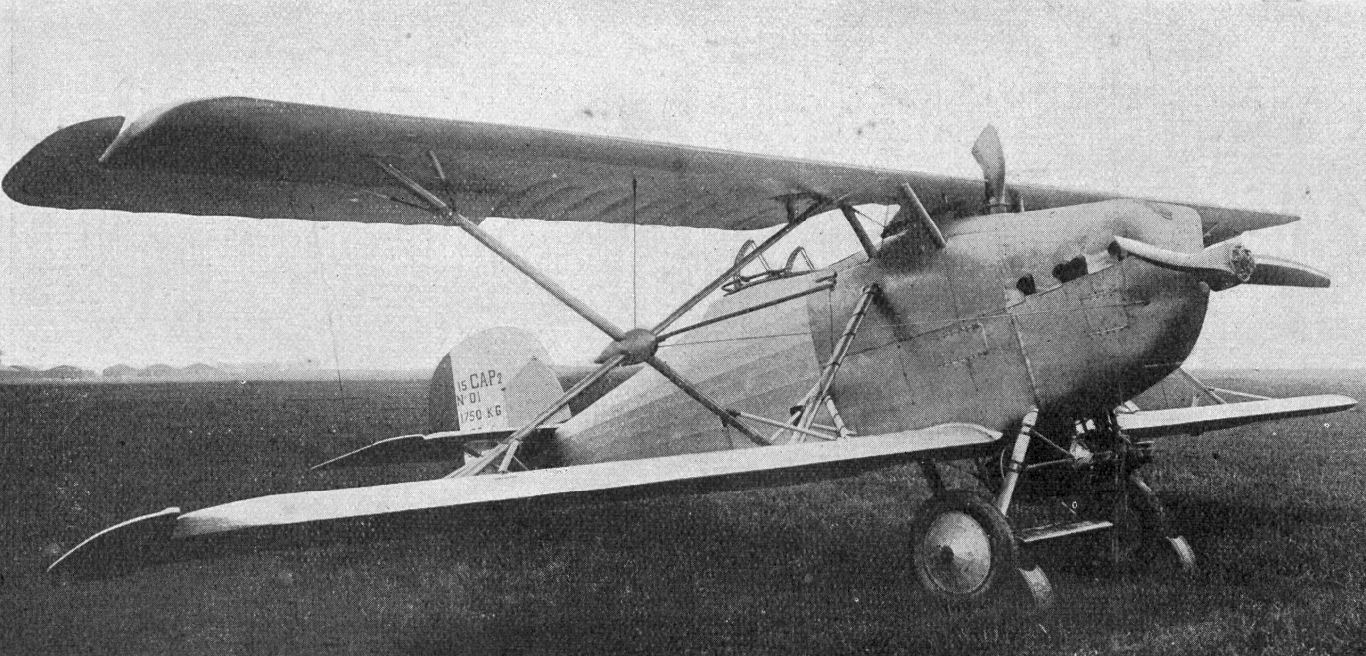

General information
- Type: Two-seat fighter-reconnaissance aircraft
- National origin: France
- Manufacturer: Aeroplanes Hanriot et Cie
- Designer: Emile Dupont
- Status: Retired
- Number built: 4

History
- First flight: April 1922

The Hanriot HD.15 was a French two-seat fighter aircraft fitted with a supercharger for good high altitude performance, built in the 1920s. Three were ordered by Japan but lost at sea during delivery.

== Design and development ==
The Hanriot HD.15 was designed in response to a government call for a turbo-supercharged high altitude fighter-reconnaissance aircraft. It was powered by a Hispano-Suiza 8Fb 8-cylinder upright water-cooled V-8 engine fitted with a Rateau turbo-supercharger intended to maintain sea level powers to altitudes up to 5,000 m (16,404 ft).

Structurally the HD.15 was an all-metal aircraft, though the flying surfaces and rear fuselage were fabric covered. The wings had rectangular section Duralumin box spars, assisted by tubular auxiliary spars forward and aft of them. In plan they were straight edged, unswept and of constant chord and thickness. The lower wing had a slightly greater span. The wing tips were essentially square, except that the horn balances of the short span ailerons on both upper and lower wings projected beyond. There was no stagger. The HD.15 had unusual interplane struts: instead of the familiar division of the wing into bays by struts braced with crossed flying and landing wires, it had a rigid, spanwise, X-shaped strut on each side, linking the upper and lower spars. Vertical wires maintained the interplane gap and the location of the crossing point, which was below mid-gap. The inboard end of each upper X-strut met the wing at the top of the aft member of a pair of cabane struts. The lower ends of the X-strut met the wing further outboard, at the bottom of a strut that ran to the upper fuselage longeron. The empennage of the HD.15 was like those used on earlier Emile Dupont designs, with a braced, rectangular tailplane mounted on top of the fuselage and a small, curved edged fin. Both carried balanced control surfaces, the elevator's balances projecting beyond the tailplane tips, and the low but broad chord, curved edge, deep rudder reaching down to the keel and moving within an elevator cut-out.

The rather tubby fuselage of the HD.15 had tubular cross-section longerons with similar, triangularly arranged, cross bracing. The pilot's open cockpit was just behind the main wing spar, under a deep trailing edge cut-out to improve his upwards and forward vision. Close behind was the observer's cockpit, fitted with a mounted pair of swivelling machine guns. The fuselage was fabric covered from the pilot's cockpit aft. The Hispano engine, enclosed under a metal cowling, was cooled with a pair of circular cross-section radiators mounted ventrally between the undercarriage legs. The HD.15 had a fixed conventional undercarriage, with mainwheels on a single axle mounted on the lower fuselage longerons by two pairs of V-struts.

== Operational history ==
The HD.15 first flew in April 1922 and should have been in competition with the Gourdou-Leseurre GL.50, but the two seat reconnaissance fighter programme had been abandoned before this date. The whole high altitude fighter project, which also included single seaters, was dropped with the inability of Rateau to deliver reliable superchargers in quantity, essentially because of high temperature material problems.

Nonetheless, the Japanese Army became interested in supercharger-engined fighters and in 1926 the prototype HD.15 was sold and delivered to them. An order for three more followed, but the ship taking them to Japan was sunk by a tidal wave en voyage.

== Specifications ==
Data from Green & Swanborough p.278

General characteristics

- Crew: Two
- Length: 7.60 m (24 ft 11 in)
- Wingspan: 11.40 m (37 ft 5 in)
- Height: 2.57 m (8 ft 5 in)
- Wing area: 32.48 m^{2} (349.6 sq ft)
- Empty weight: 1,050 kg (2,315 lb)
- Gross weight: 1,750 kg (3,858 lb)
- Powerplant: 1 × Hispano-Suiza 8Fb 8-cylinder upright water-cooled supercharged V-8, 220 kW (300 hp)
- Propellers: 2-bladed

Performance

- Maximum speed: 180 km/h (110 mph, 97 kn)
- Range: 800 km (500 mi, 430 nmi)
- Service ceiling: 10,250 m (33,630 ft)

Armament

- Guns: 2 × fixed, forward-firing 7.7 mm (0.303 in) Darne machine guns; 2 × similar guns on mount in rear cockpit
