= Lioré et Olivier LeO H-46 =

1930s French seaplane

LeO H-46

General information
- Type: Bomber seaplane
- National origin: France
- Manufacturer: Lioré et Olivier
- Number built: 1

History
- First flight: May 1936

The Lioré et Olivier LeO H-46 was a bomber seaplane built in France in 1936.

== Development and design ==
The LeO H-46 was a twin-tail monoplane floatplane bomber of all-metal construction, powered by two Gnome-Rhône 14Knr radial engines of LH and RH rotation. The production aircraft would have been powered by 1,000 hp (750 kW) engines. The LeO H-46 was first flown in May 1936 by Lucien Bourdin. During flight testing in 1938 at l'Etang de Vaine, near Marseille the H-46 was badly damaged. Expensive lengthy repairs and changing priorities led to the cancellation of the program.

== Specifications ==
Data from Aviafrance : Lioré et Olivier LeO H-46

General characteristics

- Crew: 5
- Length: 18.81 m (61 ft 9 in)
- Wingspan: 27.23 m (89 ft 4 in)
- Height: 4.55 m (14 ft 11 in)
- Wing area: 102 m^{2} (1,100 sq ft)
- Gross weight: 10,200 kg (22,487 lb)
- Powerplant: 2 × Gnome-Rhône 14Knrs 14-cylinder two-row air-cooled radial piston engines, 650 kW (870 hp) each

Performance

- Maximum speed: 340 km/h (210 mph, 180 kn) at 4,000 m (13,000 ft)
- Range: 1,000 km (620 mi, 540 nmi)
- Service ceiling: 6,000 m (20,000 ft)
- Time to altitude: 4,000 m (13,000 ft) in 20 minutes

Armament

- Guns: 3x 7.5 mm (0.295 in) Darne machine guns in nose, dorsal and ventral turrets
