= Société des Avions Blanchard =

Société des Avions Blanchard, also known as Société Constructions Aéronautiques Blanchard, was a French aircraft manufacturer of the 1920s, most remembered for their large reconnaissance flying boat for the French Navy, the Brd.1. The firm also built a seaplane to contest the Schneider Cup, the BB.2 but withdrew it before the race.

== Aircraft ==
- Blanchard BB-1
- Blanchard BB.2
- Blanchard Brd.1
