= Bréguet 610 =

1930s French reconnaissance seaplane

General information
- Type: Reconnaissance floatplane
- Manufacturer: Bréguet
- Status: prototype only
- Number built: 1

History
- First flight: 1935

The Bréguet 610 was a reconnaissance seaplane built in 1934 by the Bréguet company.

== Design and development ==
In 1933, the French Navy launched a call for tenders for a reconnaissance seaplane that could be launched from Navy vessels equipped with a catapult. Apart from this constraint of being an embedded device, the program did not impose any particular configuration, which made it possible to open the market to several aeronautical manufacturers.

The Bréguet Br 610 was a 3-seat floatplane with high shoulder mounted wings of all-metal construction, with a fuselage of welded steel tubes, covered with non-structural aluminium alloy panels and fabric. The floats were made of light alloy, and power was supplied by a 740 hp (550 kW) Gnome-Rhône 9Kdrs. The peculiarity of this floatplane was in its observation position, which consisted of a large glass pod located under the fuselage and between the two floats. An identical configuration was only found in its competitor, Lioré et Olivier LeO H-43 and also on the German observation aircraft prototype Arado Ar 198. The defensive armament consisted of a 7.5 mm (0.295 in) Darne machine gun in a dorsal turret behind the trailing edge of the wing.

The Bréguet 610 first flew at Nantes in 1935, piloted by Yves-Marie Lantz. Coincidentally, Blériot-SPAD proposed a competing project, the Bleriot-SPAD 610. After a series of tests, the Bréguet 610 was rejected from the competition and the sole prototype appears to have been kept by the Navy's flight test center and then scrapped. The competition was won by the Loire 130 and the LeO H-43.

== Specifications ==
Data from

General characteristics

- Crew: 3
- Length: 11.29 m (37 ft 0 in)
- Wingspan: 16 m (52 ft 6 in)
- Height: 3.82 m (12 ft 6 in)
- Wing area: 36.4 m^{2} (392 sq ft)
- Empty weight: 2,246 kg (4,952 lb)
- Gross weight: 3,846 kg (8,479 lb)
- Powerplant: 1 × Gnome & Rhône 9Kfr 9-cylinder air-cooled radial piston engine, 550 kW (740 hp)
- Propellers: 3-bladed metal propeller

Performance

- Maximum speed: 218 km/h (135 mph, 118 kn)
- Range: 860 km (530 mi, 460 nmi)
- Service ceiling: 5,800 m (19,000 ft)

Armament

- Guns: 1x 7 mm (0.276 in) Darne machine gun in a dorsal turret
