= Bréguet 25 =

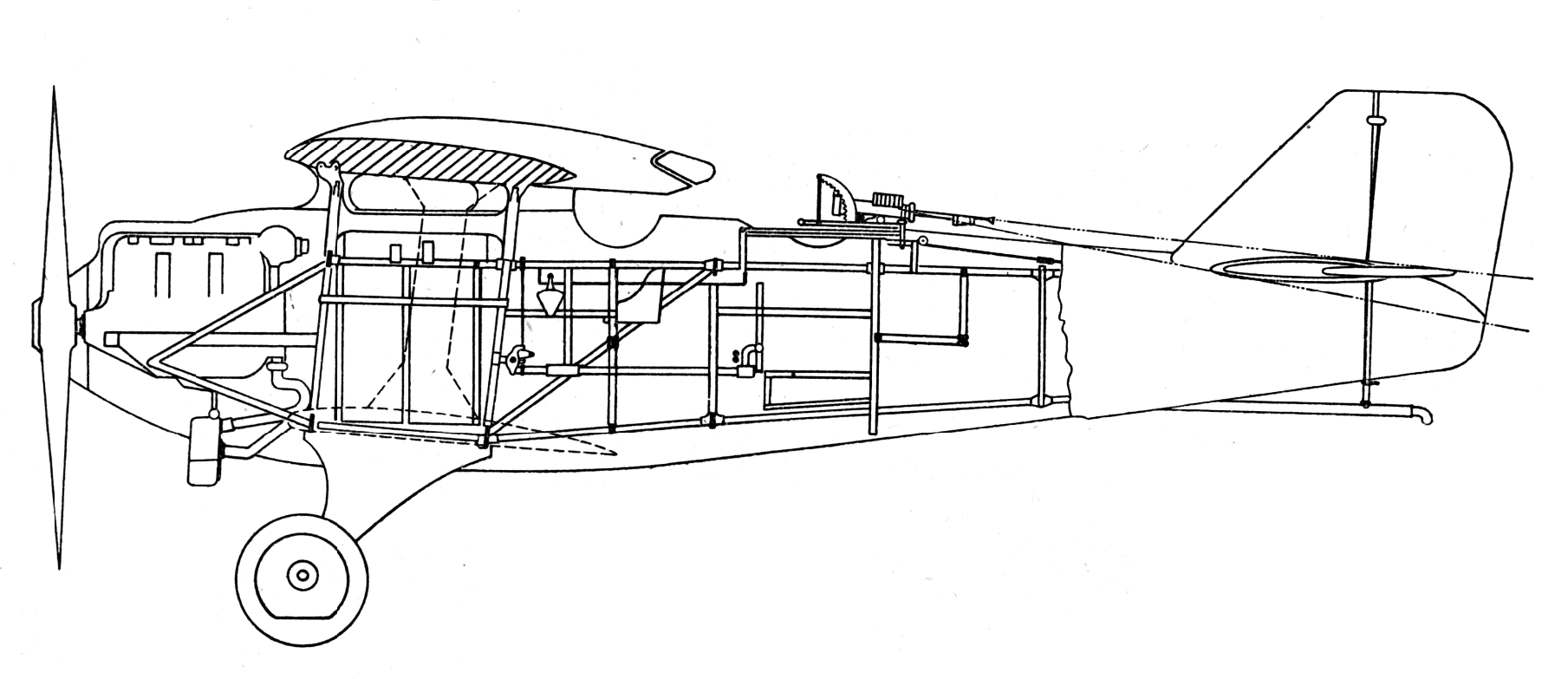

General information
- Type: Two seat fighter aircraft
- National origin: France
- Manufacturer: Bréguet
- Number built: 1

History
- First flight: 1925 if flown

The Bréguet 25 or XXV was a French two seat fighter (military category C.2) from 1925. It was heavily armed, carrying seven machine guns.

== Development ==
The Bréguet 25 was a single bay sesquiplane with a lower wing area only 28% that of the upper. The dominant upper wing was straight-edged and swept, its chord increasing outboard because the long, wide ailerons broadened towards angled tips. The sweep was 5.25° and dihedral about 1°. The lower wing had the same sweep but no dihedral. Its wings were braced together by a single, strongly outward-leaning, faired interplane strut on each side. A short cabane held the upper wing closely above the fuselage. The wing spars and ribs were metal but the wings were fabric covered.

The engine mountings of the Breguet 25 could accommodate a Lorraine 12E Courlis W12, a Renault V12, a Hispano-Suiza 12G W12 or a Hispano-Suiza 12H V12, all with power in the range 340–360 kW (450–480 hp). A photo and drawing of the aircraft in June 1925 show it with a V12, rather than a W12 engine and with its retractable radiator mounted below the engine. Behind the engine the fuselage had a structure of steel tubes held together by moulded connections. The engine mounting and forward fuselage, including the cockpit area, were covered in light metal. The pilot's open cockpit was under the trailing edge of the upper wing, which had a large cutout to allow him to see upwards; his forward view was between the wing and the fuselage. He controlled four fixed machine guns, a pair of Vickers guns firing through the propeller and a pair of Darnes on the wings. The gunner's post had three machine guns, with a pair of Lewis guns on a flexible mount and a third firing downwards and rearwards.

The rear part of the fuselage had an ovoid cross section, formed around the steel tube structure with stringers and fabric covered. The Type 25 used the same tail unit as the Breguet 19, with a triangular fin and straight-edged rudder. A triangular tailplane was mounted on top of the fuselage and carried balanced elevators.

The landing gear was conventional and fixed. On each side a tapered metal leg, narrow near the ground and broadening upwards, angled slightly outwards. It was attached to the engine mounting and carried each end of a single axle. The shock absorbers were contained within the wheels. At the tail the free end of a short strut, hinged to the fuselage, was fixed to a vertical shock absorber within the rudder post, with the tailskid rubber mounted from it.

There are no reports of the first flight of the Breguet 25 in the French press, nor of further developments.

== Specifications ==
Data from Les Ailes, June 1925

General characteristics

- Crew: Two
- Length: 9.34 m (30 ft 8 in)
- Upper wingspan: 14.83 m (48 ft 8 in)
- Lower wingspan: 7.67 m (25 ft 2 in)
- Height: 3.34 m (10 ft 11 in)
- Wing area: 43.86 m^{2} (472.1 sq ft) (upper wing area 34.35 m^{2} (369.7 sq ft))
- Empty weight: 1,093 kg (2,410 lb)
- Gross weight: 1,843 kg (4,063 lb)
- Fuel capacity: 365 L (80 imp gal; 96 US gal)
- Powerplant: 1 × Lorraine 12E Courlis , 340 kW (450 hp)
- Propellers: 2-bladed

Performance

- Maximum speed: 235 km/h (146 mph, 127 kn) at 2,000 m (6,600 ft)
- Service ceiling: 7,500 m (24,600 ft)
- Time to altitude: 20 min 30 sec to 5,000 m (16,000 ft)
- Minimum speed:80 km/h (50 mph; 43 kn)

Armament

- Two fixed, forward firing Darne machine guns
- Two fixed, forward firing (through propeller disc) Vickers gun machine guns
- Paired Lewis guns on flexible mount in gunner's post
- Single downward firing Lewis gun in gunner's post
