= Loire 45 =

The Loire 45 was a 1930s French single seat fighter.

== Variants ==
=== Loire 43 ===
A high-wing, all-metal, working-surface, fixed-wing, single-hulled monoplane, this aircraft featured a gull wing on the upper fuselage between the cockpit and the engine and was fitted with two .5mm Darne 7 machine guns. The prototype took off for the first time from La Baule beach on October 17, 1932. January 14, 1933, before the official tests started, the aircraft went into a spin at 9000 m and crashed, killing the pilot who seemed to have lost consciousness due to the altitude reached.

=== Loire 45 ===
At the moment when the Loire 43 was accidentally destroyed, the construction of a second prototype was completed at Saint-Nazaire, equipped for comparison with a 14-cylinder Gnome et Rhône 14 Kd engine of 740 hp and armed with two 20mm Oerlikon guns in the wing. Except for the engine, it was distinguished from its predecessor only by thicker mats supporting the landing gear and the cantilever of the wing. This aircraft, which took to the air on February 20, 1933, thus replaced the Loire 43 for the official tests, which took place in June in Villacoublay. It suffered from a lack of visibility for the pilot that Loire tried in vain to improve by changing the root of the wing. Restored with a Gnome-Rhône 14 Kcs of 880 hp in August 1934 and then with an enlarged drift in October. This aircraft later received a Gnome-Rhône 14 Kfs of 900 hp with which it took the air on July 18, 1935 and finished its career as a parachute test plane under the name Loire 45 LP1. The aircraft survived the Second World War and flew again in the early 1950s with the civil registration F-AKHP and a military livery.

== See also ==
=== Related development ===
- Loire 46

== Bibliography ==
- "Les chasseurs Loire 40/46" [The Loire 40/46 Fighters]. Le album de fanatique de l'Aviation (in French) (27): 2–5. November 1971. ISSN 0757-4169.
- Moulin, Jacques (2004). Loire 43, 45 & 46: les chasseurs Loire-Nieuport. Document'air. Vol. 3. n.p.: Avia Editions. ISBN 978-2-915030-07-5.
