= CAMS 52 =

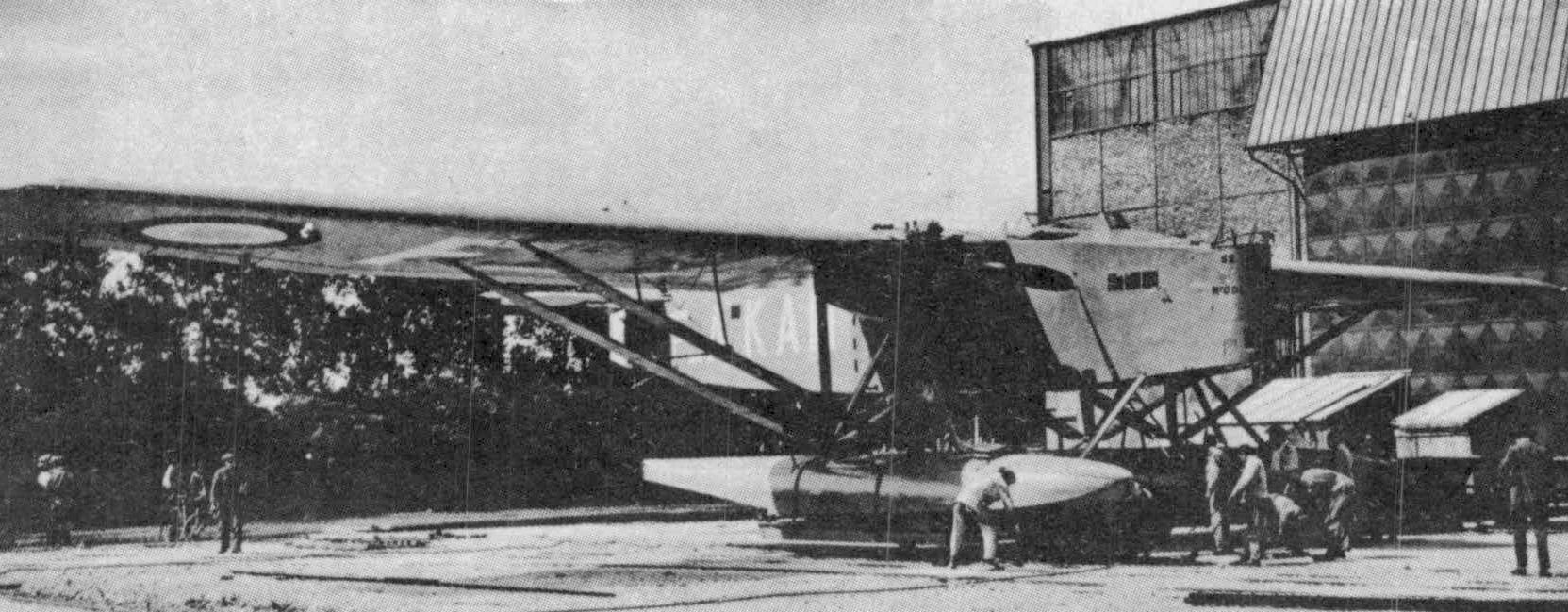

General information
- Type: Torpedo-bomber
- National origin: France
- Manufacturer: C.A.M.S.
- Number built: 1

History
- First flight: June 1930

The CAMS 52 was a twin-engined floatplane torpedo-bomber. It was not ordered by the French Navy and only one CAMS 52 was completed. It first flew in the summer of 1930.

== Design and development ==
The CAMS 52 was a French Navy torpedo-bomber floatplane prototype. The proposed production version would have been the CAMS 60 and at least one early source refers to the prototype by this name.

It was a large twin-engined high wing aircraft of mixed construction. Each half-wing was in two parts, with a centre-section which mounted the engine at its extremity and sweep-back on its leading edge to improve the downward view from the cockpit. The centre-section was entirely plywood covered; since the wing thickened towards the engine, it carried significant anhedral. The outer wings had constant chord out to about two-thirds span and carried light dihedral. Beyond, the wing was straight-tapered to blunted tips. The whole trailing edge of each outer wing was occupied by narrow-chord ailerons, divided into three sections. These outer wings had a wooden structure, with two parallel box spars and I-section ribs and were braced to the lower fuselage by pairs of parallel struts from about two-thirds span, via the float. Their leading edges were ply-covered over the whole span but the rear surfaces were dural skinned.

The CAMS 52 was powered by two uncowled 360 kW (480 hp) nine-cylinder radial Gnome-Rhône 9Akx Jupiter engines, their steel tube frames mounted on the wing underside from the forward spar and fixed to the rear spar with a cone of tubes. Two 600 L (130 imp gal; 160 US gal) fuel tanks were contained in the wing centre-section with another of the same capacity under the forward pilot's seat. Below each engine three steel struts, two in an inverted V and one vertical, joined the float centreline. Another vertical strut joined the float to the rear spar and two more ran obliquely from the lower fuselage to the engine frames. The floats were long, with hard chine and a single step. They were plywood skinned and were subdivided internally into watertight compartments. Though the CAMS 52 was designed as a floatplane, it could be adapted to use wheeled landing gear.

Its fuselage had three sections; the all-metal central part was the major structural unit, taking wing and engine loads, and was joined to the others just beyond the leading and trailing wing edges. All were flat-sided and built on girders based on four steel tube longerons. The forward and central sections were mostly ply covered but the rear covering was entirely fabric. The single-curvature nose, semi-circular in plan, contained a position for the observer/bomb aimer and was equipped with twin Lewis guns on a flexible mount. Behind him there was a separate open viewing platform for the navigator/bomber, accessed from his windowed cabin below which contained a sighting compass and map table. Aft, the upper surface rose towards the wing leading edge, where there were separate starboard-side tandem open cockpits for two pilots. On the port-side, adjacent to the first pilot, was an observer's post. This central section of the fuselage held vertically mounted bombs and externally mounted torpedoes; details of the intended armament and bomb loads are given below. It also contained a sound-proofed cabin for the wireless operator. The third section, accessed via a port side door, contained dorsal and ventral gun positions, a flexible camera mounting and a hatch in the floor used during mooring.

The CAMS 52 had a conventional, fabric covered tail, with a broad, near-triangular fin and a rectangular, wire-braced tailplane. The elevators and rudder, the latter reaching down to the keel, were narrow, straight-edged and balanced. Both rudder and elevators had inflight-adjustible trimming surfaces along their entire trailing edges.

The sole CAMS 52 was first flown in June 1930 from Sartrouville but the Navy did not choose it for production.

== Variants ==
CAMS 52
prototype, registered F-AKAH
CAMS 60
production model. Production prototype registered F-AKAN but probably not built.

== Specifications (CAMS 52) ==
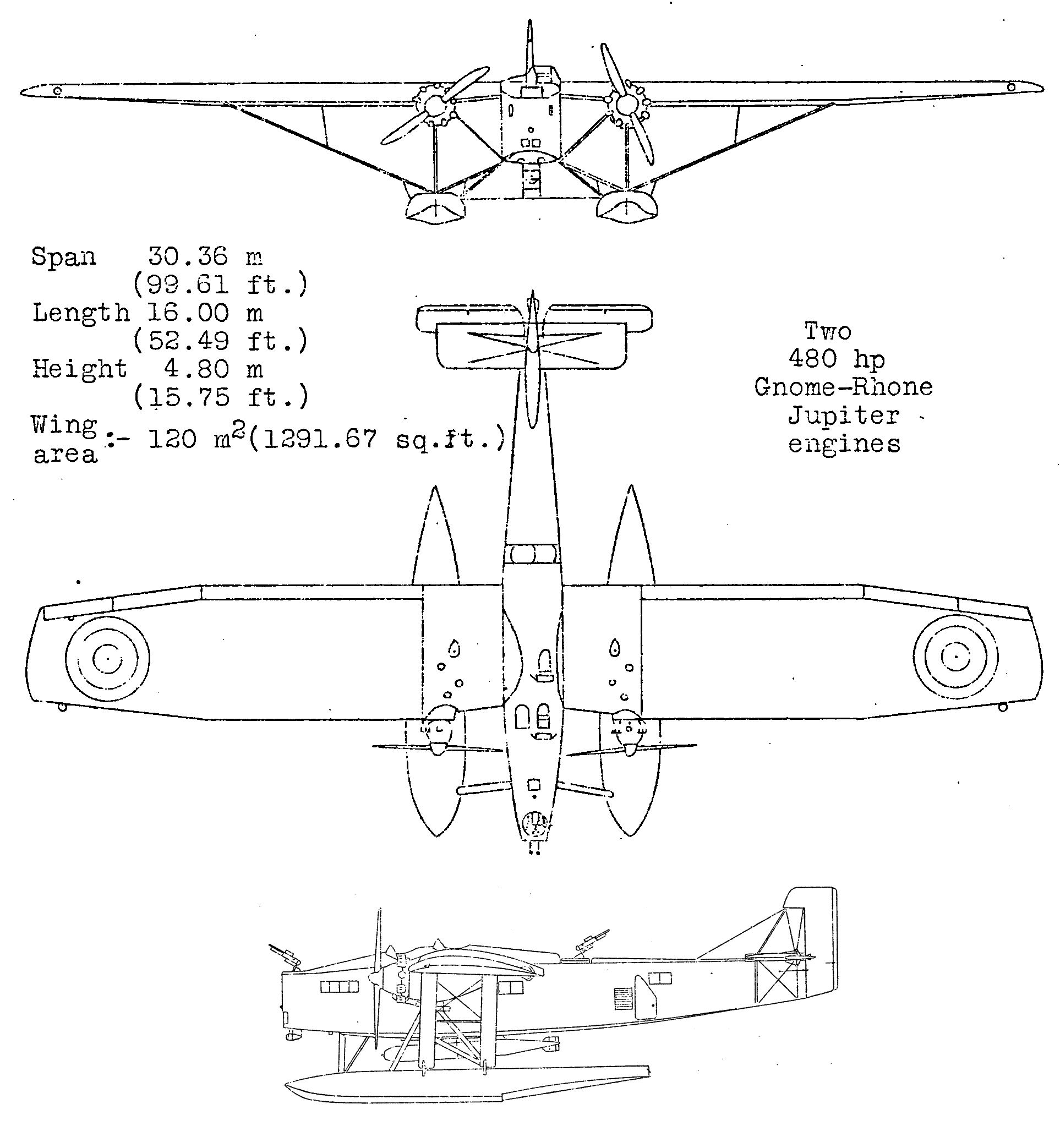
CAMS 60 3-view drawing from NACA Aircraft Circular No.141

Data from General: L'Aéronautique, October 1930. Performance: estimated for CAMS 60, L'Aéronautique, March 1931. Armamnent: Aviafrance (2000)

General characteristics

- Crew: Five or six
- Length: 16 m (52 ft 6 in)
- Wingspan: 30.36 m (99 ft 7 in)
- Height: 4.80 m (15 ft 9 in)
- Wing area: 120 m^{2} (1,300 sq ft)
- Empty weight: 4,400 kg (9,700 lb) (4,750 kg (10,470 lb) for the CAMS 60)
- Gross weight: 6,870 kg (15,146 lb) (7,220 kg (15,920 lb) for the CAMS 60)
- Fuel capacity: 1,800 L (400 imp gal; 480 US gal)
- Powerplant: 2 × Gnome-Rhône 9Akx Jupiter 9-cylinder radial, 360 kW (480 hp) each
- Propellers: 2-bladed

Performance

- Maximum speed: 200 km/h (120 mph, 110 kn) at ground level
- Range: 1,400 km (870 mi, 760 nmi)
- Service ceiling: 5,000 m (16,000 ft) practical
- Time to altitude: 28 min to 3,000 m (9,800 ft)

Armament

- Guns: Mountings for 2 × 7.7 mm (0.303 in) Lewis guns in nose, 1× 7.5 mm (0.295 in) Darne machine guns in dorsal position and another, retractable, in ventral position.
- Bombs: 1,640 kg (3,620 lb), or 2 × 400 DA torpedoes, each 670 kg (1,480 lb)
