= Alphonse Poirée =

French aviator during the First World War

Alphonse Poirée (31 December 1883 Gron - 14 November 1922 Villepinte) was a French aviator in the First World War and a post-war test pilot. He was awarded the Order of St. George and Knight of the Legion of Honor.

During World War I, he was attached to the Russian Army. After the war, he was killed testing the Caudron C. 74, when a propeller severed the tail.
