= Blanchard Brd.1 =

French reconnaissance flying boat

Brd.1
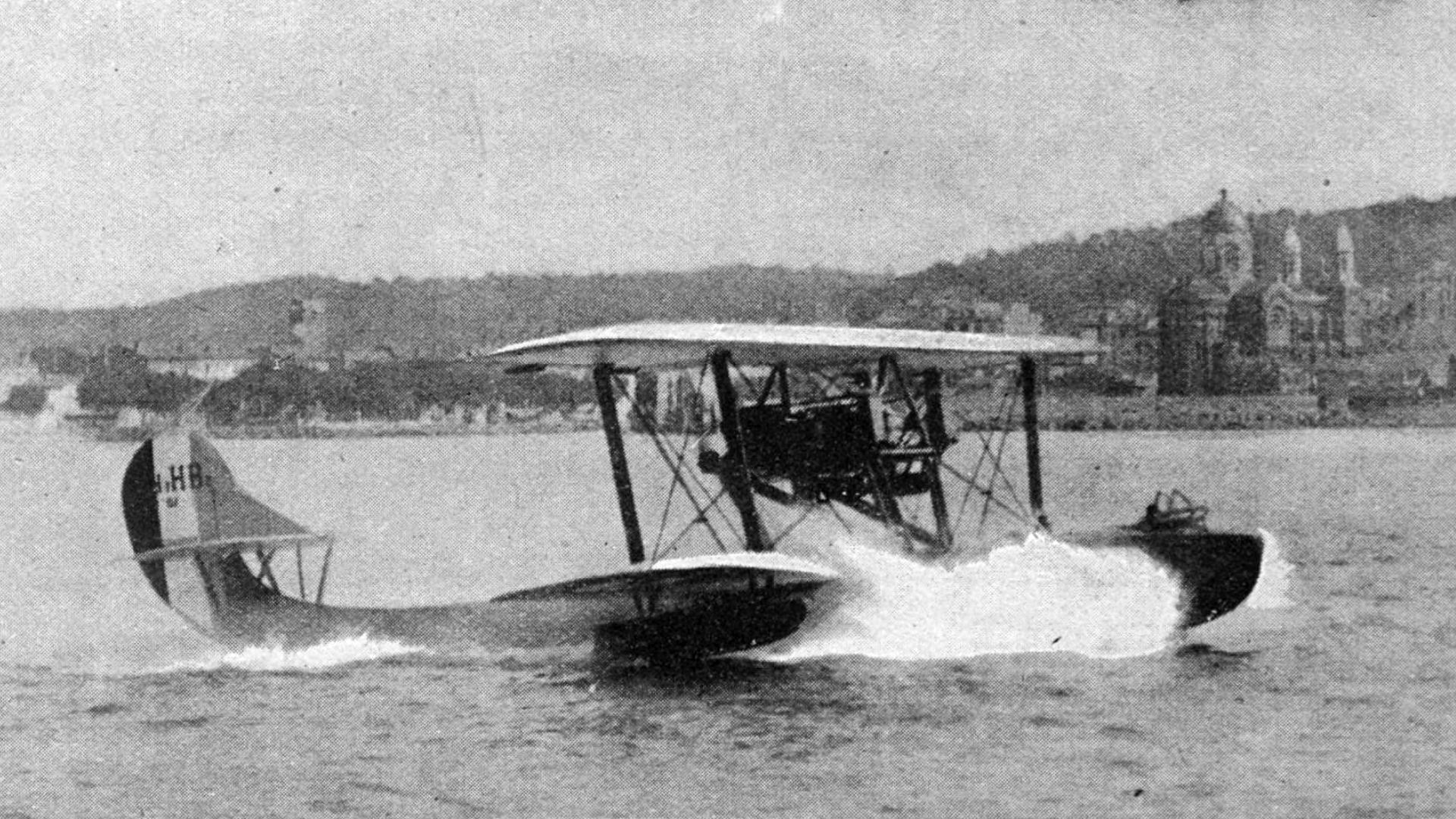

General information
- Type: Reconnaissance flying boat
- Manufacturer: Blanchard
- Primary user: Aéronautique Maritime
- Number built: 24

History
- Introduction date: 1923
- First flight: 1922
- Retired: 1926

The Blanchard Brd.1 was a French reconnaissance flying boat, to the 1923 STAé HB.3 specification, used by the French navy in the 1920s. It was a large biplane with two engines mounted in the gap between the wings, each engine driving a pusher propeller. In 1924, one Brd.1 was used to set several world altitude records for seaplanes.

== Operators ==
France

- French Navy

=== Units using this aircraft ===
Aéronautique Maritime

- Escadrille 5R1

== Specifications ==
Data from Jane's all the World's Aircraft 1924, Aviafrance:Blanchard Brd-1

General characteristics

- Crew: 3/4
- Length: 13.6 m (44 ft 7 in)
- Wingspan: 19.2 m (63 ft 0 in)
- Height: 4.2 m (13 ft 9 in)
- Wing area: 85 m^{2} (910 sq ft)
- Empty weight: 2,300 kg (5,071 lb)
- Gross weight: 3,765 kg (8,300 lb)
- Powerplant: 2 × Hispano-Suiza 8Fe V-8 water-cooled piston engines, 190 kW (260 hp) each
- Propellers: 2-bladed fixed-pitch propellers

Performance

- Maximum speed: 175 km/h (109 mph, 94 kn)
- Service ceiling: 3,500 m (11,500 ft)
- Time to altitude: 3,000 m (9,800 ft) in 30 minutes
- Wing loading: 43 kg/m^{2} (8.8 lb/sq ft)
- Power/mass: 0.1034 kW/kg (0.0629 hp/lb)

Armament

- 1 × 7.7 mm (0.303 in) machine-gun on flexible mount in bow
- 1 × 7.7 mm (0.303 in) machine-gun in flexible mount in rear fuselage
- 290 kg (640 lb) of bombs

== See also ==
Aircraft of comparable role, configuration, and era

- Curtiss NC
