= Dyle et Bacalan DB-30 =

1920s French aircraft

DB-30

General information
- Type: Reconnaissance
- National origin: France
- Manufacturer: Dyle et Bacalan

History
- First flight: 1928

The Dyle and Bacalan DB-30 was an all-metal, French reconnaissance aircraft built in the late 1920s.

== Specifications ==
Data from Aviafrance : Dyle et Bacalan DB-30

General characteristics

- Crew: Four
- Length: 13.50 m (44 ft 3 in)
- Wingspan: 28.00 m (91 ft 10 in)
- Height: 5.00 m (16 ft 5 in)
- Wing area: 125.00 m^{2} (1,345.5 sq ft)
- Empty weight: 3,090 kg (6,812 lb)
- Gross weight: 5,800 kg (12,787 lb)
- Powerplant: 2 × Lorraine 12Eb W-12 water-cooled piston engine, 340 kW (450 hp) each

Performance

- Maximum speed: 190 km/h (120 mph, 100 kn) at ground level
