= Weymann W-100 =

French Aircraft

W-100

General information
- Type: Observation and reconnaissance aircraft
- National origin: France
- Manufacturer: Société des Avions C.T. Weymann
- Number built: 1

History
- First flight: Late June – early July 1933

The Weymann W-100, also referred to as the Weymann CTW-100 or Weymann W-100 RBL, was a French three-seat observation aircraft developed in the early 1930s. It featured a dedicated position for the observer within a partially glazed fuselage, designed to enhance visibility for reconnaissance duties. Only a single prototype was constructed.

== Design and development ==
Observation aircraft from World War I and into the 1920s generally had two crew, the pilot and a defensive gunner who was also the observer. Though there had been attempts to include three positions, separating the role of gunner and observer, the extra weight of the more powerful engine required proved too great a penalty. By the mid-1930s engine technology had improved enough, in Weymann's view, to make a three-seat aircraft fast enough. The W-100 was the result of this analysis.

It was a two bay biplane with constant chord, unswept, unequal span wings with rounded tips. The wings were entirely wooden, with multiple spars and stressed plywood skin. The upper wing was significantly longer, broader and thicker than the lower and was in three parts, with a rectangular central portion that was mounted over the fuselage on two outward-leaning streamlined steel struts from the upper fuselage on each side. This section had no dihedral. The lower wings were mounted on the lower fuselage and braced to the upper wings with outward leaning N-form interplane struts; they had the same dihedral as the outer upper panels. Crossed wire bracing completed the strongly staggered structure. Servo-tabbed ailerons on upper and lower wings were linked with streamlined steel tubes.

The W-100's fuselage frame was constructed from steel tube Warren girders, resulting in an essentially rectangular section structure which was largely fabric covered. There was a 429 kW (575 hp) nine cylinder Hispano-Suiza 9Va radial engine (a licence-built Wright R-1820) in the nose under a long-chord cowling. The pilot's open cockpit was at the wing trailing edge, with the gunner's cockpit, fitted with a machine gun on a flexible mount, immediately behind. A triangular, upward hinged door in the starboard side below the gunner's cockpit gave access to the observer's position in the deepened forward fuselage between the pilot's cockpit and the engine. It had glazed panels in its top and bottom and entirely glazed sides, giving the observer clear views in all directions.

At the rear the rectangular tailplane was built into the upper fuselage and carried larger area, separate, balanced elevators. The round edged fin was wire braced to the tailplane and carried a deep, round-topped rudder, also balanced.

The W-100 had a fixed, wide 3.0 m (120 in) track undercarriage, with each mainwheel on a V-form axle and drag strut hinged from the lower fuselage. A faired Messier oleo strut was attached to the upper fuselage. There was a small, steerable tailwheel.

The Weymann W-100 first flew between late June and early July 1933, piloted by Barbot, though the location is not recorded. By August it had been further tested at Villacoublay, had returned to the factory by mid-August and was back at Villacoublay in September. There seem to be no further references to the W-100 in the French journals after this date.

== Specifications ==
Data from Les Ailes February 1934

General characteristics

- Crew: Three
- Length: 10.50 m (34 ft 5 in)
- Wingspan: 14.00 m (45 ft 11 in)
- Height: 3.40 m (11 ft 2 in)
- Wing area: 42 m^{2} (450 sq ft)
- Empty weight: 1,650 kg (3,638 lb)
- Gross weight: 2,550 kg (5,622 lb)
- Powerplant: 1 × Hispano-Suiza 9Va 9-cylinder radial, 429 kW (575 hp)
- Propellers: 2-bladed

Performance

- Maximum speed: 240 km/h (150 mph, 130 kn) at ground level
- Cruise speed: 225 km/h (140 mph, 121 kn) at 3,000 m (9,800 ft)
- Endurance: 5 hr
- Service ceiling: 8,000 m (26,000 ft)
