= Schneider Henri-Paul =

Henri-Paul
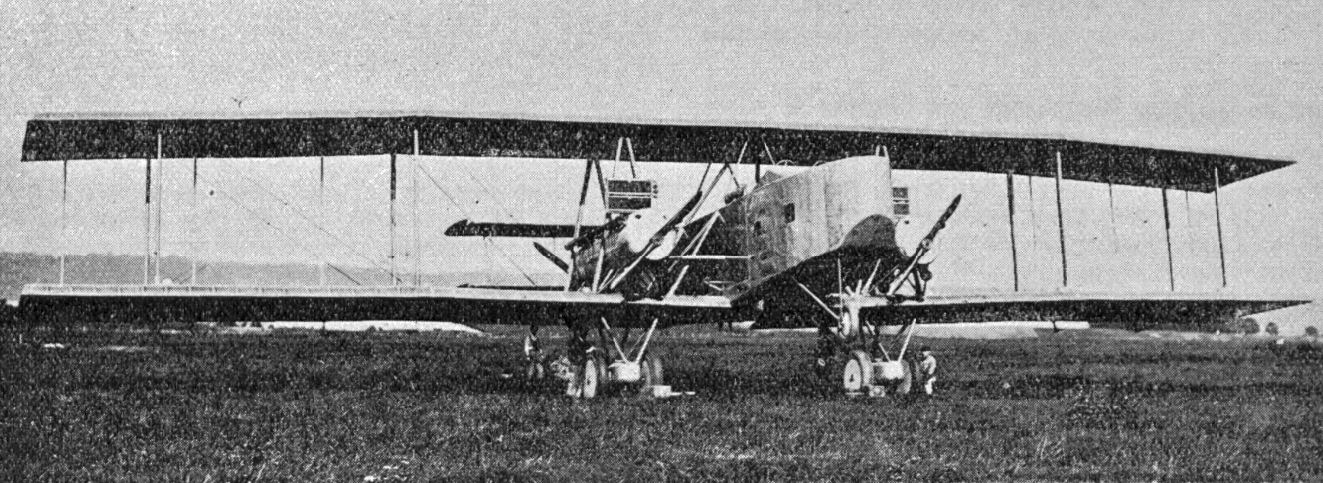

General information
- Type: Night bomber
- National origin: France
- Manufacturer: Etablissements Schneider
- Number built: 1

History
- First flight: autumn 1922

The Schneider Henri-Paul was a French four-engined night bomber with an all-metal airframe. A single example was built and flown in 1922.

== Design and development ==
Schneider-Creusot or Schneider et Cie began as an iron and steel maker and developed into a major French arms manufacturer, so it was natural that their first aircraft design was a large night bomber with an all-metal structure. It was named after pilot Henri-Paul Schneider, the son of company head Eugène Schneider II, who was killed in combat in 1918. Given the resources of this large company, Flight felt in 1923 that its design was disappointingly old fashioned, using techniques already tested elsewhere during World War I.

It was a large, two bay biplane with very similar, thin section upper and lower wings, though with dihedral (1.5°) on the lower wing only. The wings were built around pairs of Warren girder spars, similar ribs and fabric covering. Each had a rectangular plan inner section extending to mid-span and swept, constant chord panels beyond. The 9° of sweep was to keep the centre of gravity and of pressure together. They were braced together without stagger by pairs of parallel, steel interplane struts and the upper, central wing panel passed high above the fuselage on cabane struts. The trailing edges of the outer panels were entirely occupied by externally connected, unbalanced ailerons on both upper and lower wings.

Its four water-cooled, 280 kW (370 hp) Lorraine-Dietrich 12Da V12 engines were in push-pull configuration pairs sharing long, continuous, streamlined cowlings. Each pair was mounted close to the fuselage and to the lower wing on inverted V-struts and shared a rectangular radiator on the forward V-strut. All engines drove Lumière-Leitner-Watts metal propellers, two-bladed on the forward engines and three-bladed pushers behind, operating in the faster airflow from the forward engines. The three-bladed propellers are seen in a photograph from the 1922 Paris Salon, though Le Génie Civil states that the rear propellers had four blades and had a diameter of 2.60 m (8 ft 6 in), smaller than those in front. Their pitches could be adjusted on the ground.

The fuselage of the Henri-Paul was a steel tube structure with four longerons and aluminium alloy tube bracing producing a flat-sided, rectangular section which tapered to the rear. The forward fuselage was covered with aluminium alloy panels, the rest with fabric. There were six upright cylindrical fuel tanks within the fuselage, three on each side with a walkway between them. Pilot and co-pilot/navigator/gunner sat side by side in an open cockpit well ahead of the wings and in the plane of the forward propellers, and there was a gunner's position in the extreme nose and another a little behind the trailing edge. These four positions were shared between three crew.

The Schneider had a biplane tail with rectangular plan, blunt-tipped tailplanes braced on each side with two pairs of parallel interplane struts and another parallel pair from below. They carried balanced, externally connected elevators. There were three fins, the outer ones narrow, rectangular and between the tailplanes, but the central, triangular one extended forward over the fuselage. All three carried tapered, trapezoidal rudders, which projected aft of the tailplane's trailing edges; the central rudder was used only if an engine failed, to trim the asymmetry.

The bomber had conventional, tailskid landing gear. The mainwheels were in pairs below the engines, each set mounted on a pair of longitudinal frames attached to the wing by a pair of transverse V-struts from the forward wing spars, one to each end of the frames, and another V-strut from the rear spar to the rear of the frames. The axles were connected transversely to the frames via hinged mountings with rubber cord shock absorbers. Early (October 1922) photographs show it with an additional large forward wheel to avoid nose-overs but this had gone by December.

The Henri-Paul's first flights were made from Le Havre but by mid-October 1922 its third flight, piloted by Jean Casale, had taken it to Villacoublay to begin its official tests. In December 1922 it was on display at the 8th Paris Aero Show but there are no known reports of its further development in the French records.

== Specifications ==
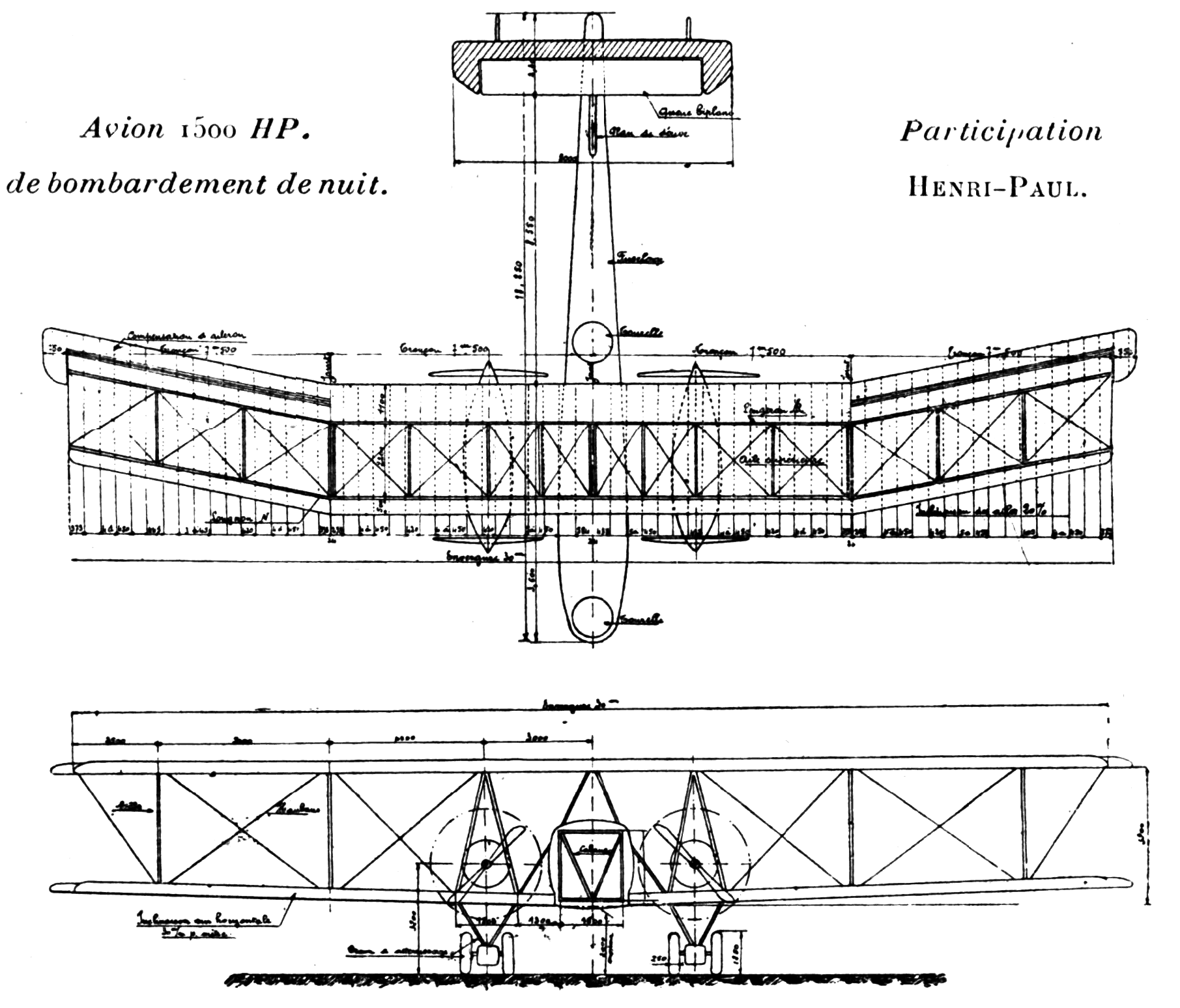
Schneider Henri-Paul 2-view drawing from L'Aéronautique January 1921

Data from Flight, February 1923, French aircraft of the First World War

General characteristics

- Crew: 3 (4)
- Length: 19.98 m (65 ft 7 in)
- Wingspan: 30 m (98 ft 5 in)
- Height: 6.1 m (20 ft 0 in)
- Wing area: 220 m^{2} (2,400 sq ft)
- Empty weight: 6,500 kg (14,330 lb) without fuel
- Gross weight: 10,020 kg (22,090 lb) with 1,700 kg (3,700 lb) fuel
- Powerplant: 4 × Lorraine-Dietrich 12Da water-cooled V-12, 280 kW (370 hp) each
- Propellers: 2-bladed tractor and pusher propellers., 2.90 m (9 ft 6 in) diameter Lumière-Leitner-Watts ground-adjustable propellers also fitted during testing.

Performance

- Maximum speed: 160 km/h (99 mph, 86 kn) at ground level
- Range: 750 km (470 mi, 400 nmi)
- Service ceiling: 5,000 m (16,000 ft) absolute
- Time to altitude: 13 min to 2,000 m (6,600 ft)
- Take-off distance: 300 m (980 ft)
- Landing distance: 200 m (660 ft)
- Landing speed: 80 km/h (50 mph; 43 kn)

Armament

- 2x 37 mm (1.46 in) and 1x 75 mm (2.95 in) cannon (proposed but not fitted)
