= Morane-Saulnier M.S.325 =

M.S.325
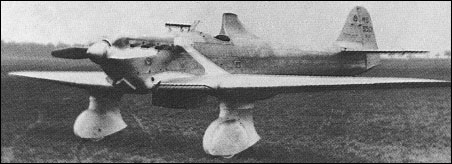
- Morane-Saulnier M.S.325

General information
- Type: Fighter
- National origin: France
- Manufacturer: Morane-Saulnier
- Primary user: French Air Force (intended)
- Number built: 1

History
- First flight: 1933
- Retired: 1934

The Morane-Saulnier M.S.325 was a French Air Force fighter aircraft built by Morane-Saulnier in 1933 to meet the requirements of 1930 fighter aircraft specification. The design was unsuccessful and was abandoned in 1934.

== Design and development ==
In 1930, when the Jockey legier Chasse, or Plan Caquot light weight fighter program was judged a failure, the Service Technique de l' Aeronautique issued the C1 (monoplace de chasse) requirement. C1 (upgraded on 26 January 1931) called for a single-seat fighter powered by a supercharged engine with a cylinder capacity of between 26 and 30 L (1,586.62 and 1,830.71 cu in). Ultimately no fewer than 10 designs and 12 prototypes were offered, all designed around the 26 L (1,586.62 cu in) Hispano-Suiza 12Xbrs developing 480 kW (650 hp) at 4,500 m (14,800 ft), with proven reliability and a relatively small frontal area. The Morane-Saulnier submissions included the M.S.275 which retained the classic parasol monoplane configuration of preceding Morane-Saulnier fighters. In the more innovative M.S.325, a low wing, duralumin-skinned all-metal configuration was employed.

The M.S.325 was relatively modest in its concept still featuring an open cockpit (originally the tail surfaces were fabric covered) and fixed-gear with the semi-elliptical two-spar wings braced by exterior struts. The wings had two jettisonable wing root fuel tanks with a pair of 7.7 mm (0.303 in) Châtellerault machine guns mounted one above each of the widely spaced landing gear legs. More unusual was that the incidence of the starboard wing greater than that of the port wing to counter torque; the engine was also canted slightly to port to counter the resultant yaw.

== Operational history ==
Morane Saulnier MS.325 side view

M.S.325 C3 No. 01 (Works no. 4120) was flown for the first time by company Chief Test Pilot Michael Détroyat early in 1933 from the factory site at Villacoublay. The first test results were not satisfactory as tail buffeting was encountered leading to modifications that included lowering the tailplane and adding wing root fairings.

Although testing proceeded, the M.S.325 continued to be hampered by handling problems. In measuring up to other C1 competitors, the M.S.325 was relegated to an "also-ran" status and the Dewoitine D.500 became the chosen design.

Development based around a Hispano-Suiza 12Xers engine with a 20 mm (0.787 in) cannon was proposed but eventually, the M.S.325 design was abandoned in favour of the more promising M.S.405 C.1 with only partial performance tests completed.

== Specifications (M.S.325) ==
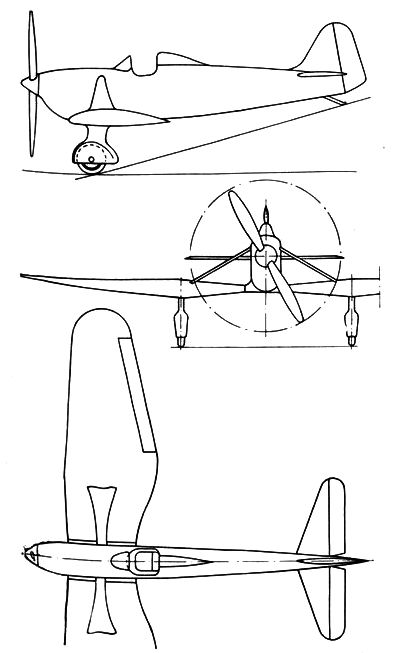
Morane-Saulnier M.S.325

Data from Flying Review International

General characteristics

- Crew: 1
- Length: 8.25 m (27 ft 1 in)
- Wingspan: 11.8 m (38 ft 9 in)
- Height: 3.7 m (12 ft 2 in)
- Wing area: 19.73 m^{2} (212.4 sq ft)
- Empty weight: 1,354 kg (2,985 lb)
- Gross weight: 1,789 kg (3,944 lb)
- Powerplant: 1 × Hispano-Suiza 12Xbrs V-12 liquid-cooled piston engine, 480 kW (650 hp)
- Propellers: 2-bladed fixed-pitch propeller

Performance

- Maximum speed: 365 km/h (227 mph, 197 kn) at 4,500 m (14,800 ft)
- Service ceiling: 12,000 m (39,000 ft) (estimated)

Armament

- Guns: 2× 7.7 mm (0.303 in) MAC 1934 machine guns
