= Blanchard BB-1 =

French racing flying boat

General information
- Type: Racing flying-boat
- National origin: France
- Manufacturer: Société des Avions Blanchard / Constructions Aéronautiques Blanchard
- Number built: 1

History
- First flight: 1924

The Blanchard BB-1 was a 1920s French racing flying-boat designed and built by Société des Avions Blanchard to compete in Schneider Trophy.

== Design and development ==
The BB-1 was a single-seat parasol-wing monoplane flying-boat powered by a 380 hp (283 kW) Gnome-Rhône Jupiter radial piston engine. The BB-1 was tested in 1924 but the performance was poor and the aircraft was not developed further and was scrapped.

== Specifications ==
Data from Jane's all the World's Aircraft 1924 Illustrated Encyclopedia of Aircraft

General characteristics

- Crew: 1
- Length: 9.71 m (31 ft 10 in)
- Wingspan: 12.20 m (40 ft 0 in)
- Height: 3.00 m (9 ft 10 in)
- Wing area: 21.00 m^{2} (226.0 sq ft)
- Max takeoff weight: 1,280 kg (2,822 lb)
- Powerplant: 1 × Gnome et Rhône 9A Jupiter radial piston engine, 280 kW (380 hp)
- Propellers: 2-bladed fixed-pitch propeller

Performance

- Maximum speed: 240 km/h (150 mph, 130 kn)
- Time to altitude: 2,000 m (6,600 ft) in 7 minutes
- Wing loading: 61 kg/m^{2} (12 lb/sq ft)
- Power/mass: 0.2206 kW/kg (0.1342 hp/lb)

== See also ==
- Schneider Trophy

Related lists

- List of flying boats and floatplanes
