= Bernard 70 =

Bernard 70 Series
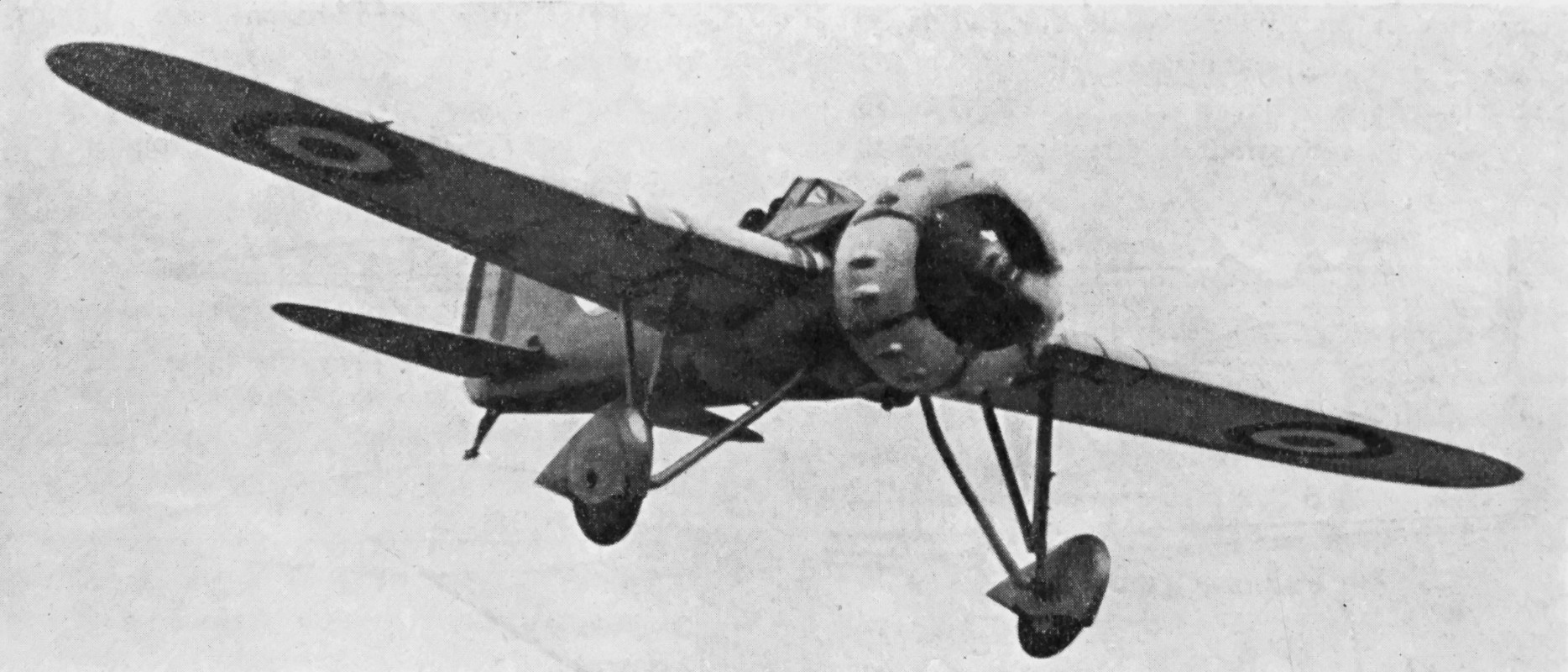
- Bernard 74

General information
- Type: Racing and Fighter monoplanes
- National origin: France
- Manufacturer: Bernard
- Number built: 3

History
- First flight: May 1930 (Bernard S-72)

The Bernard 70 was a 1920s design for a French single-seat monoplane fighter aircraft by the Société des Avions Bernard. It was not built but was developed into a racing monoplane designated the Bernard S-72, (later Bernard S-73). It was further developed into single-seat fighters, the Bernard 74-01 and Bernard 74-02, although only two of the fighters were built.

== Design and development ==
The Bernard S-72 was a wooden stressed skin constructed cantilever low-wing monoplane powered by a Gnome-Rhône 5Bc radial engine and had a fixed tailskid landing gear. Flown by Paillard, the Bernard S-72 participated in the 1930 Coupe Michelin race. On 29 June, he took off from Le Bourget, landed successively in Reims, Nancy, Strasbourg, Dijon and Clermont-Ferrand, but unfortunately had to retire near Lyon as a result of engine failure. The S-72 was re-engined with a Gnome-Rhône 7Kb and re-designated the Bernard S-73. The S-73 was then developed into the Bernard 74 single-seat fighter and retained the Titan-Major engine. Two prototypes were built with the first flying in February 1931, powered by a 280 hp (kw) Gnome-Rhône 7Kbs radial engine, the second was fitted with a 268 kW (360 hp) Gnome-Rhône 7Kd engine and first flew on 21 October 1931. The first prototype 74 was re-engined with a Gnome-Rhône 9Kbrs radial engine and re-designated the Bernard 75 it was later used as a pilot-trainer. No further aircraft were built.

== Variants ==
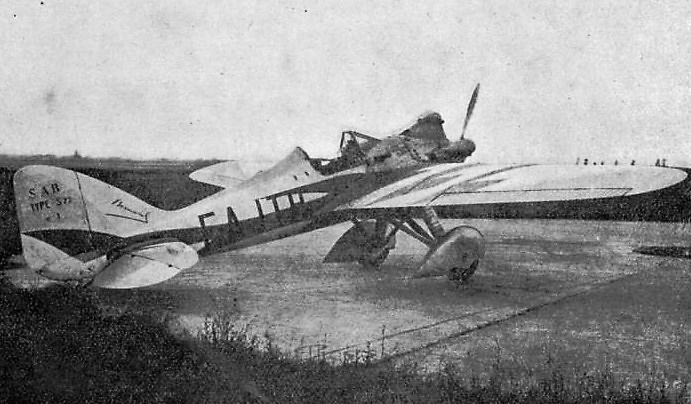
Bernard S-72 photo from Annuaire de L'Aéronautique 1931

Bernard 70
Unbuilt design for a single-seat fighter.
Bernard S-72
Single-seater racing monoplane powered by a 179 kW (240 hp) Gnome-Rhône 5Bc radial engine, first flight in May 1930. Later converted to the Bernard S-73.
Bernard S-73
The Bernard 72 re-engined with a 224 kW (300 hp) Gnome-Rhône 7Kb radial engine, first flown in May 1930.
Bernard 74-01
Single-seat fighter variant, powered by a 209 kW (280 hp) Gnome-Rhône 7Kbs radial engine, first flown in February 1931, later converted to the Bernard 75.
Bernard 74-02
A second prototype powered by a 268 kW (360 hp) Gnome-Rhône 7Kd, first flown on 21 October 1931
Bernard 75
Prototype Bernard 74-01 fighter re-engined with a 373 kW (500 hp) Gnome-Rhône 9Kbrs radial engine and later used as a pilot-trainer.

== Specifications (Bernard 74.01) ==
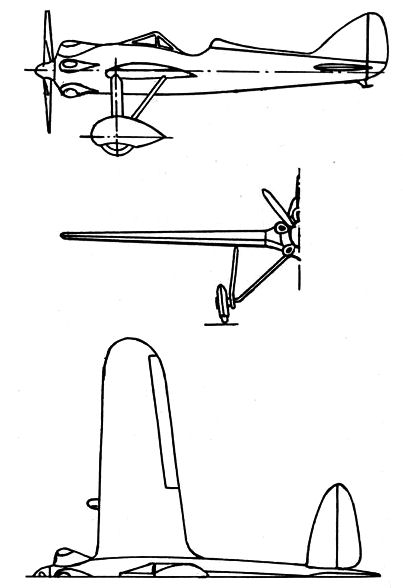
Bernard 72 3-view drawing from L'Aerophile Salon 1932

Data from

General characteristics

- Crew: 1
- Length: 6.72 m (22 ft 0 in)
- Wingspan: 9.20 m (30 ft 2 in)
- Height: 2.50 m (8 ft 3 in)
- Wing area: 13.45 m^{2} (145 sq ft)
- Empty weight: 825 kg (1,819 lb)
- Max takeoff weight: 1,106 kg (2,438 lb)
- Powerplant: 1 × Gnome-Rhône 7Kbs radial piston engine, 209 kW (280 hp)
- Propellers: 2-bladed

Performance

- Maximum speed: 310 km/h (193 mph, 104 kn)
- Service ceiling: 8,000 m (26,247 ft)

Armament

- Guns: Two fixed 7.7mm (0.303in) synchronised Vickers machine-guns
