= Levasseur PL.11 =

1930s French seaplane

PL.11

General information
- Type: Observation seaplane
- Manufacturer: Levasseur
- Number built: 1

History
- First flight: 1931

The Levasseur PL.11 was an observation seaplane built by Levasseur in the early 1930s. It was a biplane of mixed wood and metal construction with floats for operating from water.

== Specifications ==
Data from

General characteristics

- Crew: three
- Length: 10.02 m (32 ft 10 in)
- Wingspan: 14.20 m (46 ft 7 in)
- Wing area: 57.50 m^{2} (618.9 sq ft)
- Empty weight: 1,900 kg (4,189 lb)
- Gross weight: 2,800 kg (6,173 lb)
- Powerplant: 1 × Gnome & Rhône 9Ady 9-cylinder air-cooled radial engine, 310 kW (420 hp)

Performance

- Maximum speed: 170 km/h (110 mph, 92 kn)
- Range: 500 km (310 mi, 270 nmi)
- Service ceiling: 3,500 m (11,500 ft)
