= Lévy-Biche LB.2 =

Single Seat French Fighter Aircraft

LB.2
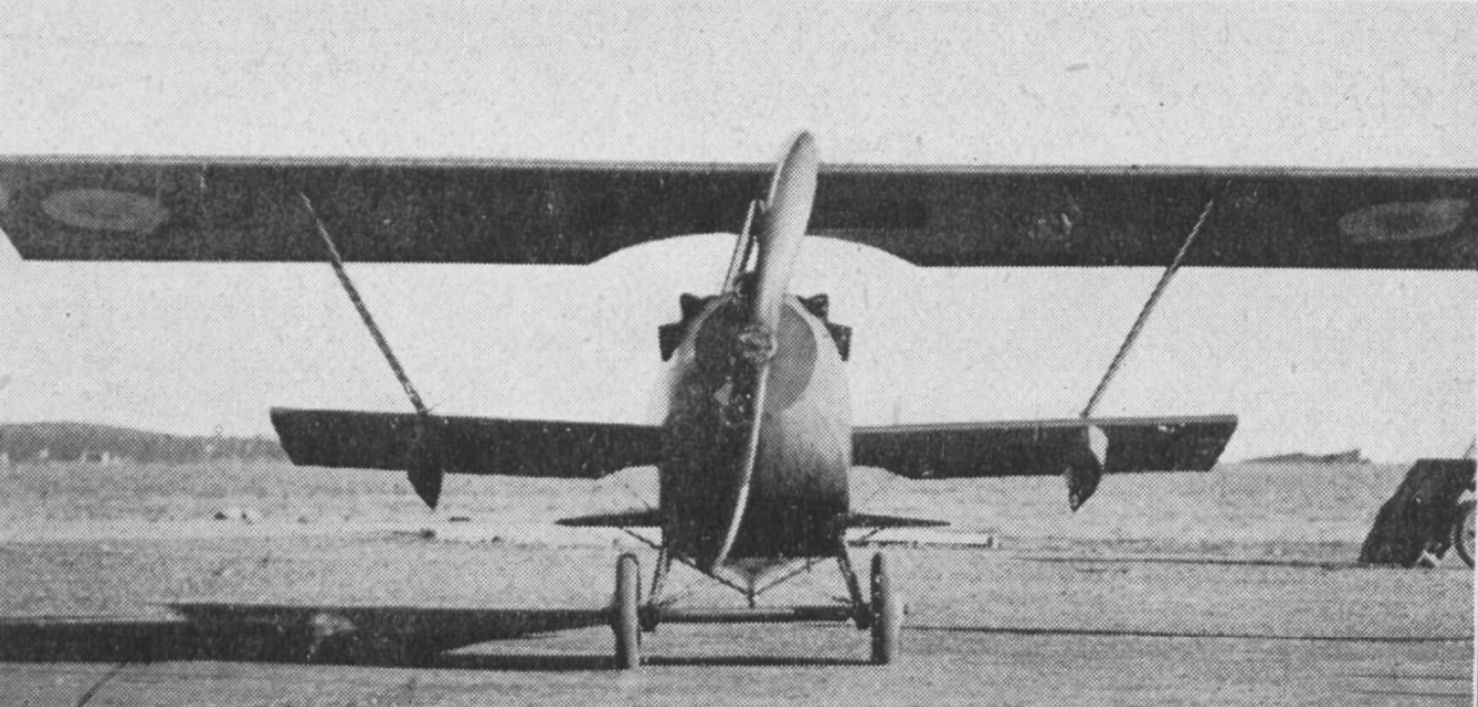

General information
- Type: Shipboard fighter aircraft
- National origin: France
- Manufacturer: Prototype: Constructions Aéronautiques J Levy. Production: Etablissements P. Levasseur.
- Designer: Jean Biche
- Number built: 21

History
- First flight: 1927

The Levy Biche LB.2 was a single seat French sesquiplane fighter aircraft designed to be used from aircraft carriers. With a watertight fuselage, jettisonable wheeled undercarriage and small under-wing floats, it could survive emergency sea touchdowns; it could also be fitted with seaplane type floats.

== Development ==
The LB.2 was designed as a shipboard fighter. It was a single bay sesquiplane, with outward leaning parallel pairs of interplane struts and wire cross bracing. The wings were strictly rectangular in plan, the lower plane smaller in both span and chord. The upper wing carried full span ailerons. Its flat sided fuselage was watertight and its belly deep; in emergency touchdowns at sea the undercarriage could be jettisoned with the aircraft stabilised with two small rectangular cross section, planing floats mounted on the lower wing underside below the interplane struts.

The LB 2 was powered by a 246 kW (330 hp) Hispano-Suiza 8Fe upright water-cooled V-8 engine. The upper wing was high above the fuselage on cabane struts and had a rounded cut-out in the trailing edge over the pilot's open cockpit to enhance his view. He had a short, faired headrest. The fuselage tapered aft and had distinct narrow keel to enhance its water surface behaviour. The braced tailplane was wide chord and triangular in plan, carrying split elevators; the fin was also broad and triangular, with a deep, curved rudder that reached down to the bottom of the extreme keel, where there was a very small tailskid. The jettisonable main fixed conventional undercarriage structure had two short V-struts, supporting a wire cross braced single axle and mainwheels. Armament consisted of a pair of 7.7 mm (0.303 in) Vickers machine guns.

The first flight was in 1927 and by October that year it had also flown with seaplane style floats. Soon after, Constructions Aéronautiques J Levy became bankrupt and production rights were purchased by Etablissements P. Levasseur. The latter built twenty production aircraft during 1928-9, designated LB.2 AMBC.1, which served on the experimental French aircraft carrier Béarn, commissioned in May 1927, as well as from shore bases. The LB.2 remained in service with French Naval Aviation until 1932, when they were replaced by Wibault 74 fighters.

== Variants ==
LB.2
Prototype.
LB.2 AMBC.1

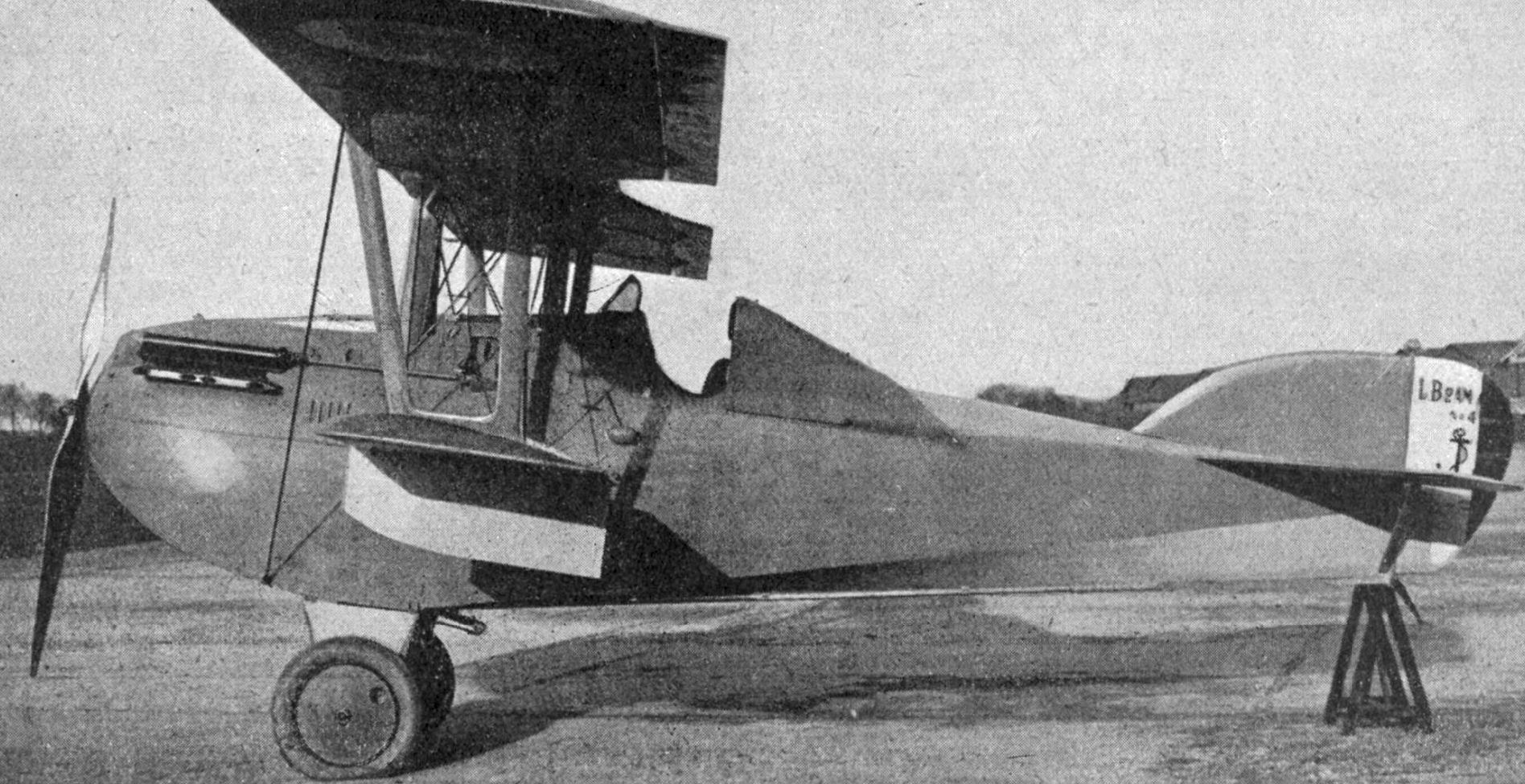
Levasseur LB.2 AMBC.1 photo from L'Aéronautique June,1928

Production by Levasseur (20 built).

== Units using this aircraft ==
France

- Aéronautique Navale
  - Fighter units aboard the Béarn
  - Shore units.

== Specifications ==
Data from Jane's all the World's Aircraft 1928, The Complete Book of Fighters

General characteristics

- Crew: One
- Length: 7.525 m (24 ft 8 in)
- Wingspan: 10.40 m (34 ft 1 in)
- Height: 3.488 m (11 ft 5 in)
- Wing area: 24.00 m^{2} (258.3 sq ft)
- Empty weight: 920 kg (2,028 lb)
- Gross weight: 1,350 kg (2,976 lb)
- Powerplant: 1 × Hispano-Suiza 8Fe upright V8 water-cooled, 250 kW (330 hp)
- Propellers: 2-bladed fixed pitch propeller

Performance

- Maximum speed: 219 km/h (136 mph, 118 kn)
- Stall speed: 88 km/h (55 mph, 48 kn)
- Time to altitude: 5,000 m (16,000 ft) in 25 minutes
- Wing loading: 55.4 kg/m^{2} (11.3 lb/sq ft)
- Power/mass: 0.182 kW/kg (0.111 hp/lb)

Armament

- Guns: 2× 7.7 mm (0.303 in) Vickers machine-guns

== Bibliography ==
- Cortet, Pierre (September 1989). "Le Levy-Biche LB 2 AM C1B". Le Fana de l'Aviation (in French). No. 238. pp. 32–33.
