= Potez 26 =

General information
- Type: Single seat fighter
- National origin: France
- Manufacturer: Henry Potez
- Number built: 1

History
- First flight: August 1924
- Developed from: Potez 25

The Potez 26 was a single seat fighter aircraft designed and flown in France in the mid-1920s. It did not reach production.

== Design and development ==
The Potez 26 was a lighter, smaller span, single-seat fighter version of the two-seat biplane Potez 25 reconnaissance aircraft. Both types were sesquiplanes with markedly smaller lower wings. Both upper and lower wings were rectangular in plan, with long-span ailerons only on the upper plane. They were single bay biplanes, their wing interconnected by N-form interplane struts assisted by wire bracing. These interplane struts leaned outwards and narrowed to meet the closer spars of the smaller-chord lower wing. Centrally, the upper wing was held over the upper fuselage by two pairs of struts, a parallel pair forward and an inverted V at the rear forming a cabane. There was a semicircular cut-out in the upper trailing edge to improve the pilot's forward view.

The Potez 26 was powered by either a 340 kW (450 hp) Hispano-Suiza 12J V-12, or the 340 kW (450 hp) Lorraine 12Ed W-12, both cooled by a radiator under the rear of the engine cowling. The engine mounting enabled a rapid exchange of engines; the Lorraine W engine installation reduced the overall aircraft length by 350 mm (13.8 in). The mounting formed part of the forward fuselage structure, which had a plywood skinned central section containing the open cockpit, raised above the structural fuselage, with decking falling away ahead and behind and a wooden framed, fabric covered rear. At the rear, the tailplane was mounted on the upper fuselage structure and externally braced to it from below with pairs of inverted V struts. Its fin was small and round edged, carrying a broad, deep rudder which reached down to the keel.

The Potez 26 had a fixed tail wheel undercarriage with mainwheels on a split axle supported centrally by a V-strut, hinged on another pair of struts to the lower fuselage and with vertical, airfoil section shock absorbers. There was a sprung tailskid.

The Potez 26 made its first flight in August 1924 and was on display at the 1924 Paris Salon. Only one was built.

== Specifications (Lorraine engine) ==
Data from L'Aérophile Salon-1924

General characteristics

- Crew: One
- Length: 7.65 m (25 ft 1 in)
- Wingspan: 12.0 m (39 ft 4 in)
- Height: 3.15 m (10 ft 4 in)
- Wing area: 32 m^{2} (340 sq ft) (upper 26.5 m^{2} (285 sq ft), lower 5.5 m^{2} (59 sq ft))
- Empty weight: 1,100 kg (2,425 lb)
- Gross weight: 1,550 kg (3,417 lb)
- Powerplant: 1 × Lorraine 12Ed W-12 water-cooled piston engine, 340 kW (450 hp)
- Propellers: 2-bladed

Performance

- Maximum speed: 250 km/h (160 mph, 130 kn) at 5,000 m (16,000 ft)
- Service ceiling: 8,500 m (27,900 ft)
- Time to altitude: 5,000 m (16,000 ft) in 20 minutes
- Landing speed: 90 km/h (56 mph)

Armament

- Two fixed, forward firing 7.7 mm (0.303 in) Vickers machine guns on top of engine cowling.
