= Levasseur PL.12 =

PL.12
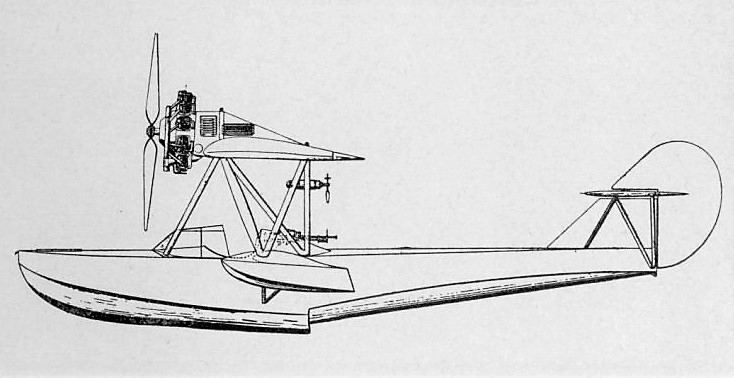

General information
- Type: Observation flying boat
- Manufacturer: Levasseur
- Number built: 1

History
- First flight: 1930

The Levasseur PL.12 was an observation flying boat built by Levasseur in the early 1930s. It was a high-wing monoplane with a monocoque fuselage.

== Specifications ==
Data from

General characteristics

- Crew: two
- Length: 8.92 m (29 ft 3 in)
- Wingspan: 13.00 m (42 ft 8 in)
- Wing area: 31.03 m^{2} (334.0 sq ft)
- Empty weight: 1,023 kg (2,255 lb)
- Gross weight: 1,600 kg (3,527 lb)
- Powerplant: 1 × Salmson 9Ab 9-cylinder air-cooled radial engine, 170 kW (230 hp)

Performance

- Maximum speed: 180 km/h (110 mph, 97 kn)
- Range: 500 km (310 mi, 270 nmi)
- Service ceiling: 3,500 m (11,500 ft)
