= Caudron C.74 =

Ten-seat, four engine passenger biplane

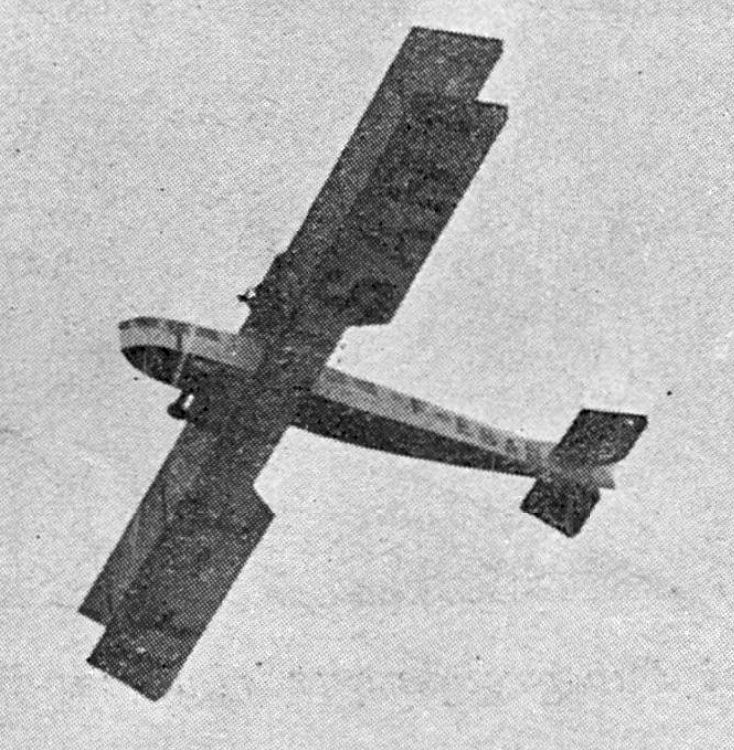

General information
- Type: Ten seat airliner
- National origin: France
- Manufacturer: Caudron
- Designer: Paul Deville
- Number built: 1

History
- First flight: 1922

The Caudron C.74 was a ten-seat, four engine passenger biplane built in France in 1922. It showed promise but the sole prototype crashed fatally in a competition and no more were completed.

== Design and development ==
The C.74 was a large biplane, powered by four 224 kW (300 hp) Hispano-Suiza 8Fb water-cooled, upright V-8 engines mounted in two pairs, each pair with one engine in tractor configuration and the other as a pusher. It was built from wood and steel and covered in plywood and fabric. An enclosed cabin could accommodate ten passengers.

The C.74 had rectangular plan wings, with the upper plane slightly greater in span than the lower. It was a three bay biplane without stagger, with two sets of parallel, vertical interplane struts outboard and two sets of leaning parallel struts inboard on each wing. The latter met on the lower wing but diverged upwards in a narrow V, forming a cradle for an engine pair. Cabane struts joined the wing centre section to the upper fuselage longerons.

The airliner had a flat sided fuselage with two open cockpits in tandem for the crew, one ahead of the wing leading edge and the other close behind but under the wing. The cabin had five flat side windows, arranged in a group of three in front of the cockpits and two behind, plus a curved window in the cylindrical nose. Aft of the last window was a port side cabin entry door. At the rear, the C.74's fin was triangular and broad, carrying a vertically edged balanced rudder that reached down to the keel. The tailplane was mounted on top of the fuselage and the elevators required a cut-out for rudder movement.

Its landing gear was essentially of the tailskid type. On each side, vertical V-form legs from the lower fuselage longerons and from under the meeting points of the two engine support struts carried a single axle with a mainwheel at either end. In addition, a third axle, similarly mounted from the fuselage but forward of the wing, carried a pair of slightly smaller wheels intended to prevent nose-overs. On each lower wing a pair of backward trailing thin skids, attached below each of the two rear outboard interplane struts and lightly braced from the trailing edge extended well behind, giving protection against accidental ground contact.

The C.74 was first flown in 1922 and seemed likely to sell well. Entered into Le Grand Prix des Avions des Transports (The Great Prize for Transport Aircraft) competition held in early November 1922, it was well regarded by the jury. On 14 November, as it took off from Le Bourget, bolts securing one of the propellers failed and the C.74 crashed killing all three crew members, the pilot Alphonse Poirée and mechanics Courcy and Bovillier. No more were built.

== Specifications ==
Data from Hauet (2001) p.175

General characteristics

- Capacity: Ten passengers
- Length: 16.60 m (54 ft 6 in)
- Upper wingspan: 25.00 m (82 ft 0 in)
- Lower wingspan: 24.20 m (79 ft 5 in)
- Height: 4.67 m (15 ft 4 in)
- Wing area: 130.00 m^{2} (1,399.3 sq ft)
- Empty weight: 3,850 kg (8,488 lb)
- Gross weight: 6,000 kg (13,228 lb)
- Fuel capacity: 950 kg (2,094 lb)
- Powerplant: 4 × Hispano-Suiza 8Fb water-cooled, upright V-8, 220 kW (300 hp) each , mounted in push-pull pairs
- Propellers: 2-bladed

Performance

- Maximum speed: 205 km/h (127 mph, 111 kn)
