= Latécoère 6 =

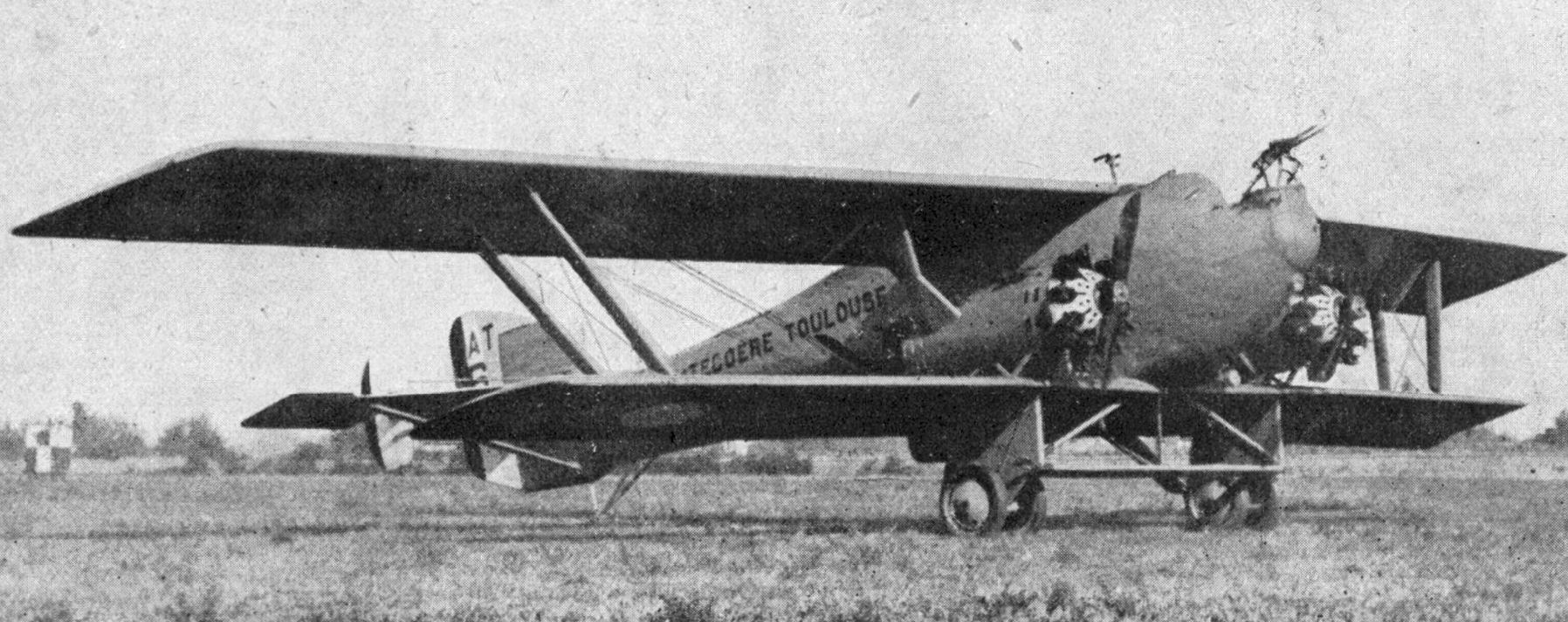

General information
- Type: Bomber
- National origin: France
- Manufacturer: Latécoère (La societe industrielle d'aviation Latécoère)
- Designer: Marcel Moine and P.G.Latécoère
- Number built: 1

History
- First flight: Summer 1924

The Latécoère 6 was a French four-engined biplane bomber of the early 1920s. It was of advanced all-metal construction and probably the first aircraft to use geodetic construction. Only one was built.

== Design and development ==
In October 1920 Latécoère won a contract to build a four-engined biplane to meet the French requirement for a machine in category BP3. The initials stood for "bombardement et protection"; the 3, that it was a three-seater. The company were asked to build a single flying example and a structure for static load testing. The Latécoère 6 was an aircraft of advanced all-metal construction and striking appearance. The airframe was designed to have sufficient redundancy to be fail-safe and its fuselage may be the first geodetic aircraft structure.

The Latécoère 6 was a sesquiplane, its lower wing having a span only 75% that of the upper plane and about 50% of its chord. The wings had straight and parallel edges but were markedly swept at about 7°. The leading edge of the narrow lower wing was slightly ahead of the upper. There were ailerons on both wings. It was a single bay biplane, the sesquiplane arrangement requiring the simple parallel inter-plane struts, streamlined and wide, to lean heavily outwards. The duralumin internal structure was complicated but based on double I section spars, nine in the upper wing and six in the lower. The wings were covered with thin steel. The tail unit was of similar construction. The tailplane was triangular and its incidence could be adjusted in flight for trim. It carried balanced elevators which reached well beyond the tailplane and which had a pair of mid-span cut-outs to allow the movement of a pair small fins. These moved along with a central rudder mounted on the short, square topped fin; the rudder's balance left a pronounced notch in the fin/rudder leading edge line.

Structurally, perhaps the most advanced part of the Latécoère 6 was the fuselage, again a duralumin structure covered with thin steel. The geodetic structure was essentially two helices, one right-handed and the other left, joined at each intersection so making a continuous network. There were no longerons, but a series of well spaced circular frames stabilised the tube. There were four of these between the tail and the trailing edge. In contrast the much later Vickers aircraft, the Wellesley and Wellington used four longerons and no frames; the helices in the later aircraft had a much longer pitch. Forward of the trailing edge, the fuselage deepened rapidly, creating a little balcony from which a gunner could cover attacks from behind and below. A second rear gunner had a dorsal position just slightly aft. The pilot sat with his head at the wing leading edge and in front of him the fuselage fell rapidly away to another gunner's position in the extreme nose.

The engines, initially four 260 hp (190 kW) Salmson Z9 water-cooled radials were wing mounted in tractor-pusher pairs driving four-blade propellers. The water-cooled engine, with its radiator behind the propeller allowed neat, tight and well streamlined cowlings, mounted above the lower wing on a series of short struts. Each pair had two struts connecting the lower cowling to the upper fuselage and another strut ran from the upper cowling outwards to the upper wing. The main undercarriage was a divided axle type, each single bungee sprung main wheel carried on two legs immediately below the engine, with a pair of struts inboard to the lower fuselage. Just forward of this wide track undercarriage ran a streamlined transverse skid, from wheel to wheel, mounted on the lower wing.

The Latécoère 6 first flew in the summer of 1924 at Francazal, piloted by Achille Enderlin. It soon became obvious that the aircraft was underpowered, perhaps because of weight gains during construction. Despite this and damage sustained during testing there was considerable official interest and a new contract enabled Latécoère to modify the aircraft to take four more modern and powerful engines, 420 hp (310 kW) Gnome et Rhône 9A Jupiter engines. This revised machine was known as the Latécoère 6 M. Externally, as well as the obvious change to partially-cowled air-cooled engines with their protruding cylinder heads, a very broad chord strut, narrowest at its midpoint now braced each engine to the upper wing, and each single main wheel was replaced by a pair. The 6 M first flew in 1925 and made a successful series of tests towards the end of that year. Meanwhile, the static specimen was undergoing stress tests with excellent results and for a while there was a serious chance of a production order. In the end, that never came as the advanced airframe was judged too complex to build and too expensive. Latécoère regarded it as a ruinous exercise.

== Specifications (6 M) ==
Data from Cuny 1992, pp. 44

General characteristics

- Crew: 4
- Length: 15.95 m (52 ft 4 in)
- Wingspan: 27.70 m (90 ft 11 in)
- Height: 4.70 m (15 ft 5 in)
- Wing area: 120 m^{2} (1,292 sq ft)
- Empty weight: 5,050 kg (11,133 lb)
- Gross weight: 6,590 kg (14,528 lb)
- Powerplant: 4 × Gnome et Rhône 9A Jupiter 9-cylinder single row radial engines , 313 kW (420 hp) each

Performance

- Maximum speed: 198 km/h (123 mph, 107 kn) at sea level
- Range: 1,000 km (620 mi, 540 nmi) with 1000 kg (2,200 lb) bombs
- Service ceiling: 6,500 m (21,325 ft) calculated
- Rate of climb: 4.1 m/s (804 ft/min) to 2,000 m (6,600 ft)

Armament

- 3× 7.7 mm (0.303 in) Lewis machine guns in dorsal, ventral and nose positions
