= Nieuport-Delage NiD 50 HB.4 =

NiD 50 HB.4

General information
- Number built: 1 partially completed

The Nieuport-Delage NiD 50 HB.4 was a twin-engined bomber / reconnaissance floatplane, designed in the latter half of the 1920s, to the 1928 HB.4 specification from the Service Technique de l'Aéronautique (STAé), for a four-seat seaplane bomber. Development was cancelled before the first prototype was completed.

== Development ==
Issued in January 1928, the STAé published an offshore torpedo bomber seaplane HB.4 specification. Nieuport-Astra responded and exhibited the partially complete NiD 50 HB.4 at the 1928 Paris Aero Salon. The aircraft was a large monoplane skinned entirely with light alloy sheet supported on two 10.60 m (34.8 ft) long all-metal floats and powered by two 310 kW (420 hp) Gnome & Rhône 9A Jupiter radial engines.

The 4 crew members were to have consisted of a gunner in the nose, pilot, navigator and gunner in the rear fuselage.

== Specifications (NiD-50 HB.4) ==
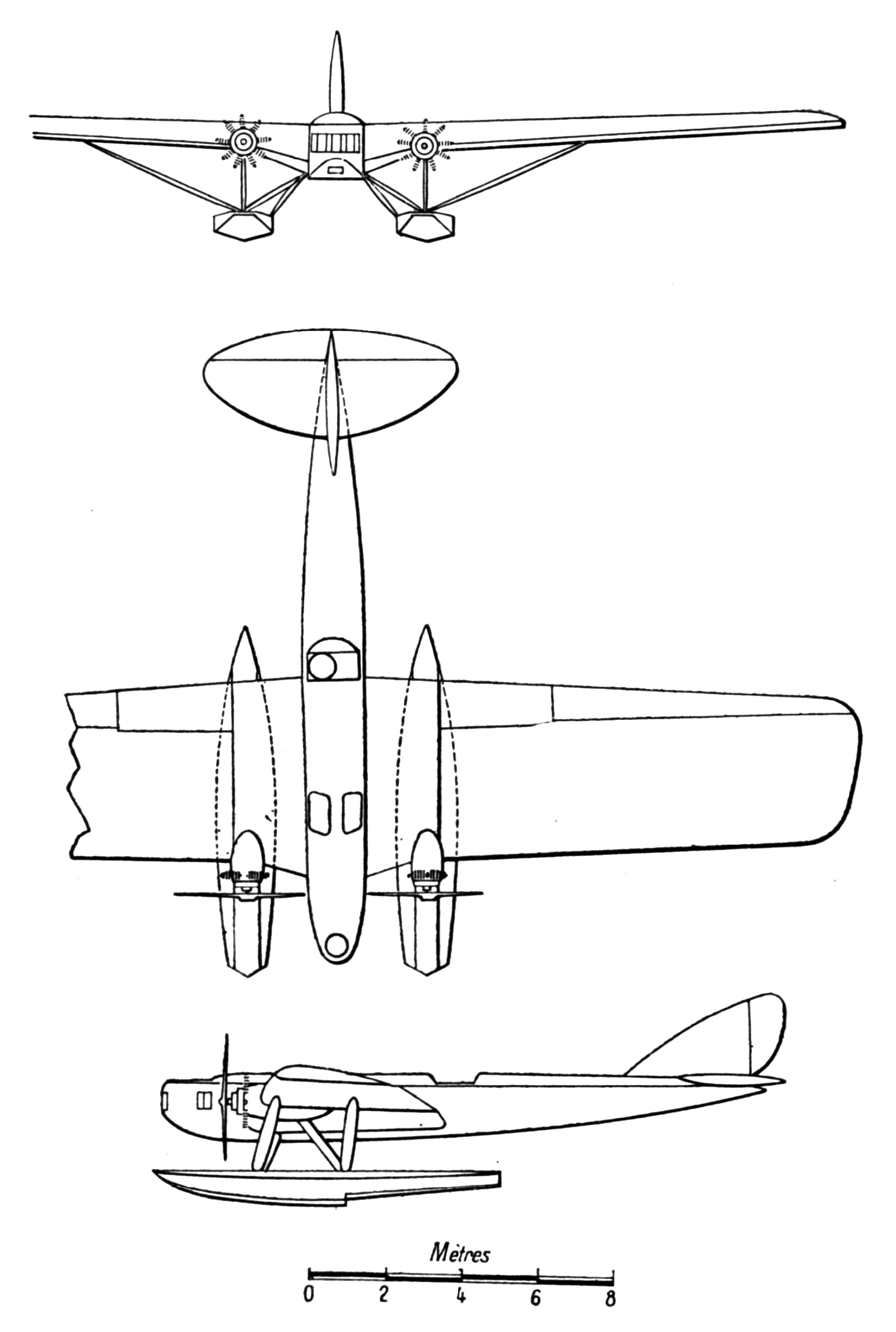
Nieuport-Delage NiD 50 HB.4 3-view drawing from L'Aéronautique June,1928

Data from Jane's all the World's Aircraft 1928

General characteristics

- Crew: 4/5
- Powerplant: 2 × Gnome et Rhône 9A Jupiter 9-cylinder air-cooled radial piston engines, 310 kW (420 hp) each

Armament

- Guns: 4x 7.7 mm (0.303 in) Lewis machine-guns on twin mounts in front and rear gunners compartments, with provision for a ventral machine-gun
