= CAMS 32R =

1920s French flying boat

General information
- Type: maritime Reconnaissance aircraft
- National origin: France
- Manufacturer: Chantiers Aéro-Maritimes de la Seine (C.A.M.S.)
- Number built: 1

History
- First flight: 1923

The CAMS 32R was an amphibious reconnaissance flying boat flown in the early 1920s. It used a monocoque fuselage.

== Specifications ==
Data from

General characteristics

- Crew: Two
- Length: 9.38 m (30 ft 9 in)
- Wingspan: 12.40 m (40 ft 8 in)
- Height: 3.06 m (10 ft 0 in)
- Wing area: 43.00 m^{2} (462.8 sq ft)
- Empty weight: 1,000 kg (2,205 lb)
- Gross weight: 1,500 kg (3,307 lb)
- Powerplant: 1 × Hispano-Suiza 8Ac 8-cylinder V-shaped inline piston engine, 130 kW (180 hp)
- Propellers: 2-bladed
- Maximum speed: 160 km/h (99 mph, 86 kn)
