= Dewoitine D.19 =

D.19
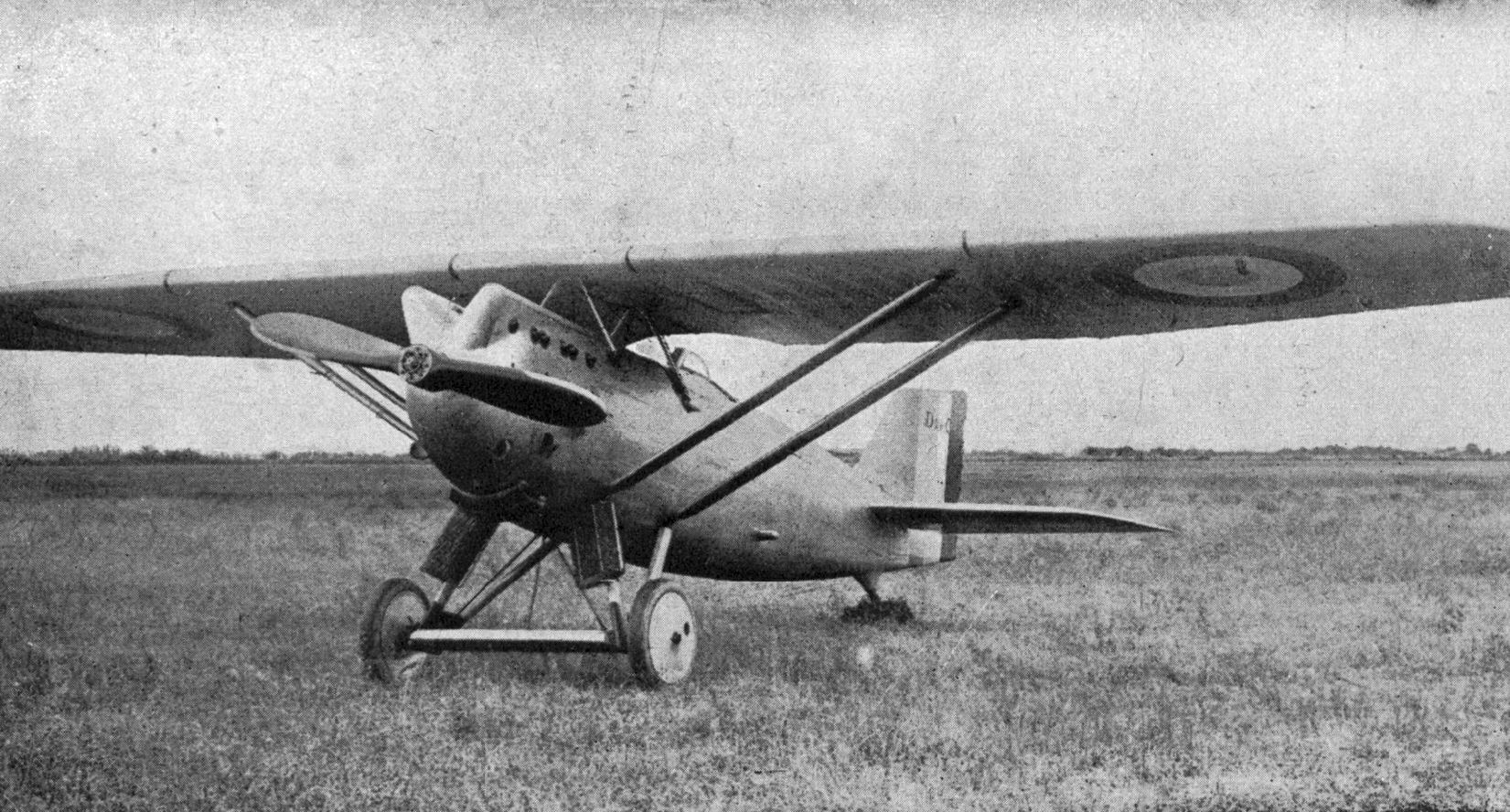

General information
- Type: Fighter
- Manufacturer: Dewoitine
- Number built: 5

History
- First flight: 1925

The Dewoitine D.19 was a fighter aircraft built in France in 1925 in response to a French Air Force solicitation.

== Design and development ==
A development of the D.1, the D.19 shared the D.1's parasol-wing configuration, but featured an all-new wing of increased span, and had double the engine power. Although rejected by the French Air Force, a demonstration for the Swiss government in August 1925 led to an order for three aircraft. An additional example was sold to Belgium, incorporating the same changes requested by the Swiss. These included a change in the wing (changing back to become more similar to the D.1), and the replacement of the Lamblin radiators with a more conventional frontal radiator.

== Operational history ==
While the first Swiss D.19 was entirely constructed by Dewoitine in France, the remaining two aircraft were supplied to be assembled by the Swiss factory EKW. The aircraft were used for many years by the Swiss Fliegertruppe as trainers for fighter pilots, remaining in service until 1940. All three participated in the international aviation meet at Dübendorf in 1927, with one of the D.19s winning the closed-circuit race.

== Operators ==
Belgium

- Belgian Air Force

Switzerland

- Swiss Air Force

Czechoslovakia

- Civil registration L-BYSA

== Specifications (D.19 C.1) ==
Data from Jane's all the World's Aircraft 1928, Aviafrance:Dewoitine D.19

General characteristics

- Crew: 1
- Length: 7.87 m (25 ft 10 in)
- Wingspan: 10.8 m (35 ft 5 in)
- Height: 3.4 m (11 ft 2 in)
- Wing area: 20 m^{2} (220 sq ft)
- Empty weight: 964 kg (2,125 lb)
- Gross weight: 1,300 kg (2,866 lb)
- Fuel capacity: 156 kg (344 lb) (ca. 109 L (29 US gal; 24 imp gal))
- Powerplant: 1 × Hispano-Suiza 12Jb V-12 water-cooled piston engine, 300 kW (400 hp)
- Propellers: 2-bladed wooden fixed pitch propeller

Performance

- Maximum speed: 265 km/h (165 mph, 143 kn) at sea level

262 km/h (163 mph; 141 kn) at 2,000 m (6,600 ft)
259 km/h (161 mph; 140 kn) at 3,000 m (9,800 ft)
256 km/h (159 mph; 138 kn) at 4,000 m (13,000 ft)
250 km/h (160 mph; 130 kn) at 5,000 m (16,000 ft)

- Range: 400 km (250 mi, 220 nmi)
- Service ceiling: 8,500 m (27,900 ft)
- Rate of climb: 7.3 m/s (1,440 ft/min)
- Wing loading: 65 kg/m^{2} (13 lb/sq ft)
- Power/mass: 0.288 kW/kg (0.175 hp/lb)

Armament

- Guns: 2 × fixed, forward-firing 7.7 mm (0.30 in) Vickers machine guns
