= Gourdou-Leseurre GL.50 =

GL-50

General information
- Type: Fighter
- National origin: France
- Manufacturer: Gourdou-Leseurre
- Number built: 2

History
- First flight: 1922

The Gourdou-Leseurre GL.50, also known as the Gourdou-Leseurre Type F, was a French fighter prototype of the early 1920s.

== Development ==
In April 1919, General Duval of the French Armée de l'Air set out for the replacement of two of the principal categories of aircraft within the air force - CAP2 (Chasse, Armée, Biplace meaning 'armed two-seat fighter') and CAN2 (Chasse, Armée, Nuit, Biplace meaning 'armed two-seat night fighter'). Gourdou-Leseurre put forward the GL-50 as a submission for the CAP2 category (despite the fact that this categorisation system was removed in 1920). Its 300 hp Hispano-Suiza engine was intended to be fitted with a supercharger, however this was not fitted, despite the fact it would have increased its performance drastically. It was of wooden construction, with a long-span untapered wing, considered unusual at the time, that feature being more in line with single-seat aircraft design, as were the wing bracing struts.

== Operational history ==
The date is not recorded of the first flight of the GL-50, however it is known that it occurred in 1922. However, for no apparent reason the aircraft did not satisfy the needs of the specification and therefore no further production was continued. Only 1 GL.50 was built, and also one of its main variant, the GL.51.

== Variants ==
- GL.51 - intended to satisfy the CAN2 specification. Similar to the GL-50 except for a 380 hp Gnome & Rhône 9Ab engine and a lighter loaded weight resulting in a higher top speed

== Specifications (GL.50) ==
General characteristics

- Crew: 2
- Length: 9.3505 m (30 ft 8.13 in)
- Wingspan: 14.60 m (47 ft 11 in)
- Height: 2.85 m (9 ft 4 in)
- Wing area: 40.00 m^{2} (430.57 sq ft)
- Gross weight: 2,010 kg (4,431 lb)
- Powerplant: 1 × Hispano-Suiza 8Fb , 224 kW (300 hp)

Performance

- Maximum speed: 210 km/h (131 mph, 114 kn)

Armament

- 2 x fixed forward-firing 7.7mm Darne machine gun
- 2 x rear-mounted swivelling 7.7mm Darne machine gun
