= Darne machine gun =

Mitrailleuse Darne
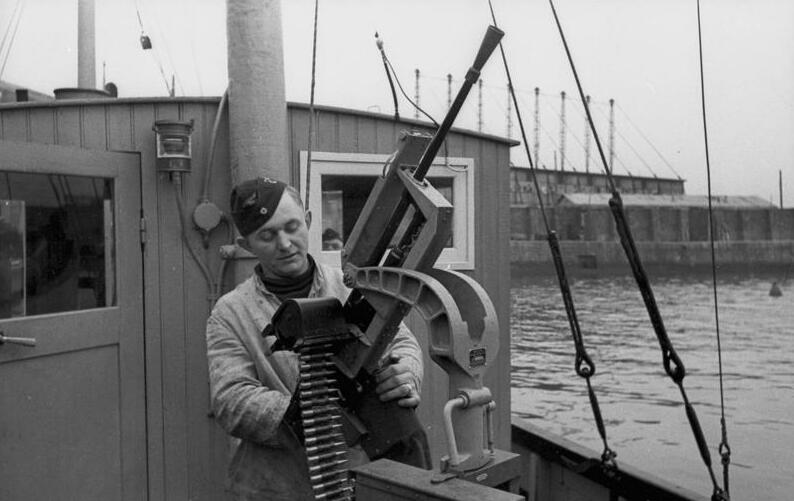
- Captured Darne machine gun mounted as an anti-aircraft weapon
- Type: Machine gun
- Place of origin: France

Service history
- Used by: See § Users

Production history
- Manufacturer: Darne
- Variants: See § Variants

Specifications
- Mass: 7.8 kg
- Length: 1.12 m
- Cartridge: 8×50mmR Lebel; .303 British; 7.5x54mm MAS −(mod. 1929)−; 7x57mm Mauser
- Action: Gas, tilting breech block
- Rate of fire: 1100–1200 rounds/m
- Muzzle velocity: 830 m/s (2,700 ft/s)
- Effective firing range: Ground: 200 m (660 ft)
- Maximum firing range: Ground: 500 m (1,600 ft)
- Feed system: Belt
- Sights: Iron sights

The Darne machine gun is a machine gun of French origin.

== Development ==
The French gun-making company Darne, which became famous for its innovative shotguns, began making military weapons in 1915, when it was contracted by French government to manufacture Lewis machine guns. In 1916 this same company announced the development of its own indigenous design of machine gun. This belt-fed weapon was designed especially for quick manufacture, without unnecessary refinements typical for most contemporary small-arms. External finish and appearance of the Darne machine gun was crude, but worked well and its price was much lower than of any contemporary weapon with comparable combat characteristics.

The French Army tested Darne machine guns from 1917 to 1918, but the war ended before production contracts could have been signed. Despite this, during the 1920s and 1930s the Darne company managed to refine an aircraft variant of the machine gun to the point where it was adopted by French and some other air forces for the role of an observer's gun. There were many variants of the Darne machine gun, although most were certainly less successful. In the 1920s and 1930s Darne offered a number of lightweight belt-fed machine guns for infantry or vehicle use. All these machine guns were made according to the same principle of reducing cost, but unlike its aircraft variants found no buyers during the inter-war period.

It was eventually replaced by the MAC 1934 for Air Force use, although the French Navy continued to use them into World War II. Small numbers were also exported to Brazil, Spain, Yugoslavia, Italy and Lithuania, and captured French Darnes were used by German occupation forces for coastal defense. The initial guns were made by Darne in France but it appears that later production was outsourced to Spain, where it could be done more cheaply.

== Overview ==
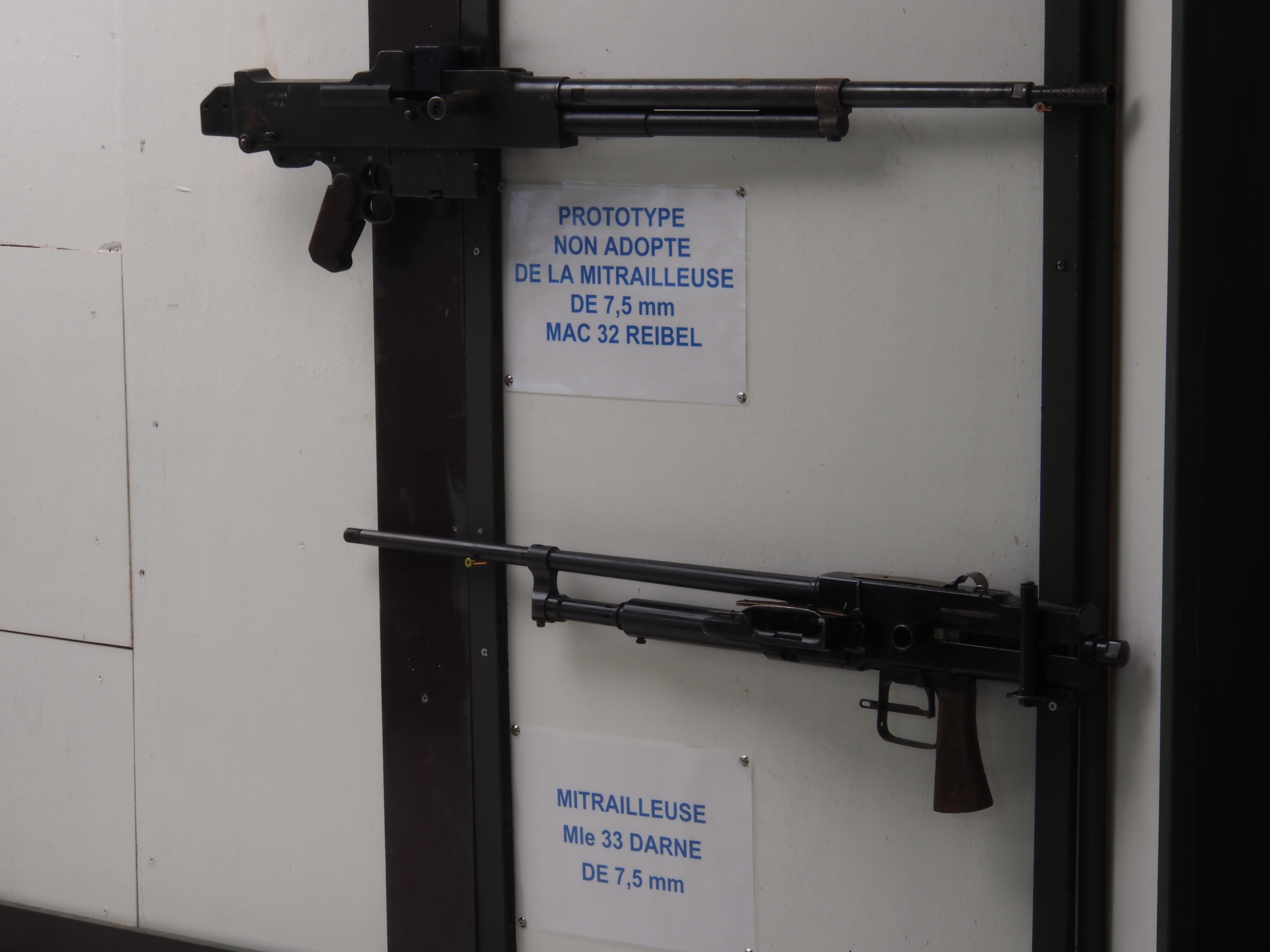
The MAC 32 Reibel prototype, and a Darne machine gun on display at the Ouvrage Fermont museum.

The Darne machine gun is gas operated, firing from open bolt in full automatic only. The breech is locked by tilting the rear part of the bolt up into the mortise cut in the roof of receiver (similar to the M1918 Browning Automatic Rifle). The Darne machine gun has an unusual belt feed between the gas piston and barrel, using the two-stage cartridge feed system (cartridge withdrawn from the belt to the rear, and then pushed forward into the barrel). The weapon usually has provisions to attach a belt box directly below the receiver to improve handling characteristics of the gun. Earlier versions of the Darne were chambered for the 8mm Lebel and .303 British cartridge, but the weapon was quickly updated to the new 7.5mm French military cartridge. Some export guns were also made in 8mm Mauser, and various other cartridges.

== Variants ==
=== Land Variant ===
Infantry versions of the Darne machine gun were normally fitted with a pistol grip and rifle-type trigger below receiver, and a wooden buttstock. Alternate variants featured skeletonized pistol grip made of metal and a top-folding shoulder stock, also made of metal. A folding bipod or a compact lightweight tripod was used to mount the Darne machine guns in ground roles.

=== Aircraft Variant ===
The aircraft variant equipped French aircraft until 1935 when it was replaced by the MAC 1934, except in naval aircraft. Often criticized for its lack of reliability in the aircraft role, as other similar rifle calibers, the 7.5 mm bullets proved to be too light for air combat in World War II.

== Users ==
- Brazil
- France
- Germany – Designation: 7.5 or 8 mm l.MG 106(f)
- Italy – 1000 machine guns in .303 purchased in 1924, designated as Darne cal. 7,7.
- Lithuania
- Spain
- Yugoslavia

== See also ==
- List of machine guns
- List of secondary and special-issue World War II infantry weapons
- List of aircraft of the French Air Force during World War II
