= Noguès =

Noguès or Nogués is a surname. Notable people with the surname include:

- Antoine Noguès (1777–1853), French Army general
- Charles Noguès (1876–1971), French Army general
- Jean-François-Xavier Noguès (1769–1808), French Army general
- Jean-Côme Noguès (born 1934), French children's author
- Josep María Nogués (born 1959), Spanish football manager
- Juan José Nogués (1909–1998), Spanish football player and manager
- Marcel Nogues (1895–1919), French World War I flying ace
- Maurice Noguès (1889–1934), French aviator
- Oscar Nogués (born 1978), Spanish racing driver
- Pierre Cassou-Noguès (born 1971), French philosophe
- Raúl Nogués (born 1952), Argentine football player
