= Antoine Noguès =

French general

- Born: 7 May 1777; Castelnau-Rivière-Basse, Hautes-Pyrénées, France
- Died: 21 December 1853 (aged 76); Jû-Belloc, Gers, France
- Spouse: Jenny Saint-Pierre-Lespéret
- Parent(s): Antoine Noguès; Marie Rangon
- Relatives: Jean-François-Xavier Noguès (brother); Henri Saint-Pierre-Lespéret (father-in-law)

Antoine Noguès (7 May 1777 – 21 December 1853) was a French Army general. He served in the Grande Armée as well as in the Hundred Days and the Waterloo Campaign.

== Early life ==
Antoine Noguès was born on 7 May 1777 in Castelnau-Rivière-Basse, Hautes-Pyrénées. His father, Antoine Noguès, was a landowner in Castelnau-Rivière-Basse; his mother was Marie Rangon. His elder brother, Jean-François-Xavier Noguès, also became a general.

== Career ==
Noguès joined the Army of the Eastern Pyrenees on 3 February 1792. He was appointed as second lieutenant in 1793, aide-de-camp to Jean Lannes in 1795, and lieutenant followed by captain in 1796. He served in Italy in 1801–1802, and in the Antilles in 1802–1803. He was wounded in Saint Lucia in 1803 and promoted to battalion chief. Upon returning to France, he became an aide-de-camp to Pierre Augereau, and he served in the Grande Armée from 1805 to 1806, when he became lieutenant colonel. He served as a colonel in Germany from 1806 to 1808, and as Chief of the Defence Staff in Puigcerdà, Spain from 1811 to 1813.

Noguès served as brigadier general in Girona, Catalonia and Aragon from 1813 to 1814. He joined the Army of the North in 1815, and he served in the Hundred Days and the Waterloo Campaign. He commanded the Hautes-Pyrénées from 1818 to 1830, and the Basses-Pyrénées from 1830 to 1848.

Noguès became a commander of the Legion of Honour.

== Personal life, death and legacy ==
Noguès married Jenny, the daughter of Henri Saint-Pierre-Lespéret. She was the godmother of Jenny Foch, the sister of Marshal Ferdinand Foch.

Noguès died on 21 December 1853 in Jû-Belloc, Gers. His memoirs were edited by Baron André de Maricourt in 1922.

== Works ==
- Noguès, Antoine (1922). de Maricourt, André (ed.). Mémoires du général Noguès sur les guerres de l'Empire : 1777-1853. Paris: Lemerre. OCLC 422417070.
