= Maricourt =

Maricourt may refer to:

== People ==
- André de Maricourt (1874-1945), French writer
- Pierre de Maricourt, scholar of the Middle Ages XIIIth century

== Places names ==
- Maricourt, Quebec, Canada
- Maricourt Lake, in Abitibi-Témiscamingue, Quebec, Canada
- Maricourt, Somme, France
