= Dewoitine D.33 =

D.33
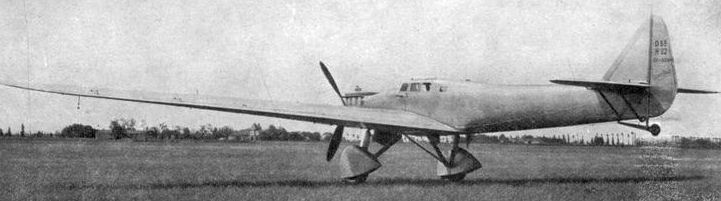

General information
- Type: Single-engine low-wing monoplane
- Manufacturer: Dewoitine
- Primary user: Air France

History
- First flight: 1930
- Variants: D.332, D.333, D.338

The Dewoitine D.33 was a single-engine low-wing all-metal monoplane aircraft designed and produced by the French aircraft manufacturer Dewoitine. It is best remembered for setting a long-distance world record on its maiden flight in 1930.

The D.33 was developed in response to an initiative by the French Air Ministry to encourage advanced into the nation's industrial aeronautical capabilities. Dewoitine was only one of several companies to respond; the development process took roughly one year. Beyond the initial D.33 model, further derivatives of the aircraft were produced; there were three major variations to the type, each of which was designed as a separate aircraft. Largely due to the record-breaking performance achieved, this line of aircraft were highly regarded and attracted considerable commercial interest throughout the 1930s. Several of these derivatives were operated as an airliner by flag carrier Air France and even being used in a military context during the Second World War. Shortly after the end of the conflict, the remaining aircraft were retired, having become obsolete.

== Development ==
The origins of the D.33 can be traced back to 1929 and the implementation of a wider policy of ordering prototypes to encourage technical progress by French aircraft companies. That year, the French Air Ministry issued a specification that sought a long-range aircraft that was suitable for setting international endurance and distance records; it specifically offered a generous bonus that would be paid if a range of 10,000 kilometres (6,214 miles) could be demonstrated. Corresponding orders were placed with multiple entities, including Société des Avions Bernard, Blériot Aéronautique and Dewoitine.

== Design ==
The Dewoitine D.33 was a single-engine low-wing cantilever monoplane of all metal (duralumin) construction. It had a slim and streamlined fuselage, the main cross section of which had been intentionally reduced to a minimum. The D.33 had a shell-type fuselage, which was common to Dewoitine designs of the era. It was divided across numerous bulkheads and frames that were connected by four main U-section longerons and small stringers. Duralumin sheet panels covered the airframe's exterior. In order to facilitate the fuselage's assembly, it was cut off behind the wing spar and attached to it by four bolts. The forward portion was connected with the rear portion by two bolts while the leading edge of the wing was connected to via four bolts. The upper covering of the leading edge formed the floor of the cabin while the trailing edge did not pass through the fuselage as to permit the installation of the navigator's and radio operator's stations in the resulting space to the rear.

The aircraft was typically flown by a crew of three (comprising a pilot, navigator and radio operator) that were seated in a tandem arrangement within an enclosed cabin. A passageway was provided between the different crew positions. On account of the aircraft's long distance performance, various amenities and comfort features were provided for the crew; these included a couch that permitted rest breaks to be taken and a toilet. The pilot, who was seated in front, had optimal visibility from their position. Their windshield had sliding panes and the roof could be rapidly opened for emergency egress via parachute. The instrumentation panel, which was suspended elastically, was within easy line of sight for the pilot. Heated air could be drawn from behind the radiator via an adjustable trap. The navigator's instrumentation included a compass, clock, air speed indicator, and altimeter. Electricity was generated by a retractable generator mounted on a telescopic mast.

The wing of the D.33, which was composed of metal, had a trapezoidal form complete with elliptical wingtips. Furthermore, it had a relatively high-aspect ratio, permitting it to achieve relatively high efficiency, while still retaining a relatively low structural weight of 10 kg/m2 (2.05 lb./sq.ft.), which was considered to be particularly low for a metal wing. Its structure used only a single spar, positioned at one-third of the chord from the leading edge; the lateral boxes at the centre of this structure formed the aircraft's 16 fuel tanks as well; these tanks proved to be resistant against not only the routine impact stresses of many take-offs and landings, but also deformation when the wing was intentionally overloaded. The spar's supporting structure consisted of two duralumin-section flanges and two openwork sheet webs; stress was uniformly distributed by the flanges' decreasing thickness across the span. Box-type vertical compression members were also used; the oblique members, which normally worked in tension, were stiffened by Q sections.

To ease ground transportation of, as well as repairs to, the aircraft, the wing was dividable into five sections. The spar flanges, which differed in width across each section, were connected by sturdy hinges composed of high resistance steel able to withstand stresses of up to 100 tonnes (220,462 lb.). The sole spar could absorb all bending stresses without buckling despite its comparatively small width, partially due to the strong flanges. The leading edge, which could withstand both drag and torsional stresses, comprised box ribs and plain ribs that were cross-braced using compact longitudinal strips. A smooth covering of sheet duralumin was present, its thickness varied according to the anticipated stresses of that particular area. The leading edge was connected with the spar via two long hinges; all sections along the span were joined to one another using continuous hinges that followed the outline of the wing section. Stresses from the trailing edge, which was composed of riveted tubular ribs, were conveyed forwards to the spar. In the centre of the wing, each solid rib was flanked by two lightened ribs as a weight reduction measure.

In spite of the typical tendency for thin wings to induce vibration, there was no meaningful vibration generated by the D.33's wing across any engine speed or angle of attack flown. Neither was any noticeable torsion of the wing tips present even in the event of an abrupt deflection of the ailerons while flown at high speeds. Even when flown in a fully loaded configuration, the flight characteristics of the aircraft remained highly manoeuvrable as well as being inherently stability; even in rough skies, the D.33 was reportedly a satisfactory aircraft to fly. It was also quite easy to both take-off as well as to land, in part due to the centre of gravity of the empty aircraft being slightly behind that of its placement when fully loaded. The low-mounted position of the wing was also conducive during both the take-off and landing phases of flight. The ailerons were placed as close to the hinge axis as to reduce their centre of gravity and to reduce their inertia; to reduce the impact of jams, the ailerons were divided into several portions, each having two hinges.

The aircraft was powered by a Hispano-Suiza 12N V12 engine that drove a two-bladed Ratier metal propeller. Measures to maximise propeller efficiency included the unobstructed nose of the engine cowling as well as its positioning being well forward of the leading edge of the wing. Engine cooling was achieved via a honeycomb radiator that was located on the base of the fuselage; it could be partly retracted using tubular controls that worked in torsion and via a square-threaded screw. Reserve water tanks were also present both above the engine cylinders and within the fuselage. The oil tank was located behind the engine, which was separated by a firewall. The blade-type radiator for the oil was located within the cowling. A heating tube was present in the air intake. A Fire extinguisher were also located in the engine bay while a hand pump was also provisioned to mitigate against the failure of the mechanical pumps.

The aircraft was furnished with a fixed tailwheel undercarriage. It consists of a bent axle of uniform strength supported in front by a biconical tube and vertically by a shock absorber. The wheels were mounted on ball bearings and were equipped with brakes which that could be individually actuated by the pilot. The axle was attached directly beneath the wing spar, permitting the shock absorber to transmit its stresses directly onto the spar, while the compression member rested on a fuselage frame at the connecting point for the engine bearer. The tail skid had a wheel, complete with a rubber tyre, that was supported by a multiple-braked spring type shock absorber in the stern post.

The rear portion of the fuselage was strongly tapered as to increase the efficiency of the flight controls; this compact contact area did not permit the use of a cantilever stabilizer, thus it was instead braced by several small tubular struts. The stabilizer had two parallel spars connected by ribs while the covering, which was applied in strips parallel to the spars, was stiffened by flanged edges and sections. The stabilizer was adjustable mid-flight by a square-threaded screw mounted on the rear spar and operated via a nut, cable, and wheel; the stabilizer's angle of incidence was indicated by a pointer. The elevator flaps consisted of a channel-section front spar on which were mounted two removable panels that were internally stiffened by section members. Similar construction was used for the rudder.

== Operational history ==
The French aviators Joseph Le Brix and Marcel Doret flew the D.33 prototype on record-setting flight in 1931. It was powered by a Hispano-Suiza 350-horsepower (261 kW) water-cooled direct-drive engine and carried 4,700 litres (1,242 US gal; 1,034 imp gal) of gasoline (petrol) as fuel and 250 litres (66 US gal; 55 imp gal) of lubricating oil. In addition to the weight of the two pilots, the plane carried a load of 2,160 kilograms (4,762 lb), including 3,000 litres (793 US gal; 660 imp gal) of gasoline sealed off from the rest of its fuel system to ensure it had the weight to qualify for a record-setting flight, giving it a weight of 8,965 kilograms (19,764 lb). It carried no Wireless or wireless operator.

Le Brix and Doret took off from Istres, France, at 06:36 on 23 March 1931, making a takeoff run of about 1,300 metres (4,265 ft) that lasted 68 seconds. They flew a triangular course from Istres to Montpellier to Nîmes. Although fog during the night of 23–24 March forced them to shorten part of their course, they remained aloft continuously for 32 hours 17 minutes before landing at 14:54 on 24 March. The flight covered a distance of 4,662 kilometres (2,897 mi) at an average speed of 151.36 kilometres per hour (94.05 mph). The flight set seven new world records, for both duration and distance by an aircraft carrying a load of 500 kilograms (1,102 lb), both duration and distance by an aircraft carrying a load of 1,000 kilograms (2,205 lb), both duration and distance by an aircraft carrying a load of 2,000 kilograms (4,409 lb), and average speed by an aircraft over a distance of 2,000 kilometres (1,242.7 mi).

== Variants ==
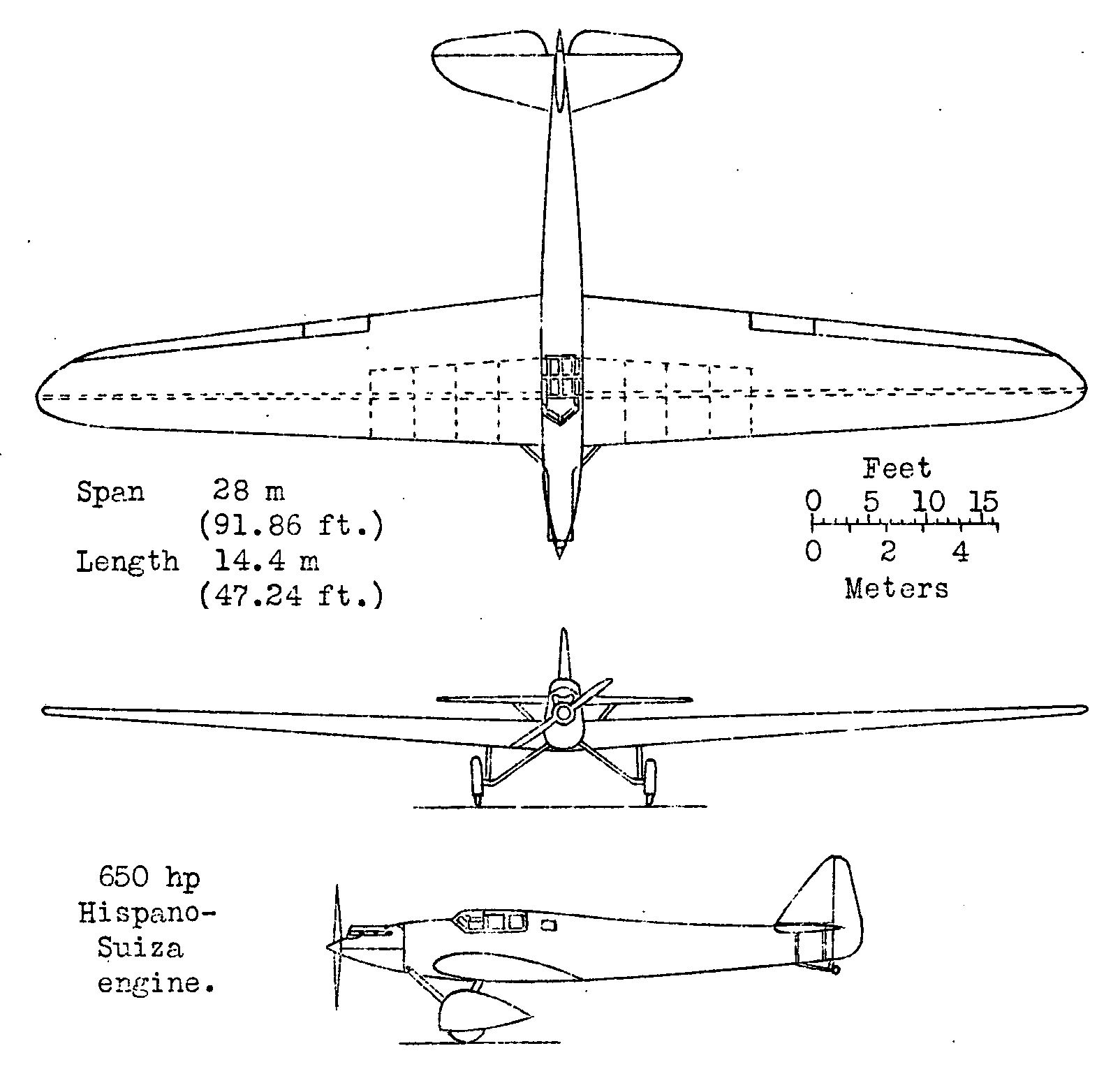
Dewoitine D.33 3-view drawing from NACA Aircraft Circular No.146

- D.33.01 : First prototype.
- D.33.02 : Second prototype.

== D.332 ==
The D.332 was developed based on the original D.33. A single-spar cantilever low-wing monoplane, the D.332 had fundamental resemblances to the original design. Able to hold a total of eight passengers, the D.332 had a small, enclosed cockpit, with an aerodynamic design and a rigid undercarriage. It was constructed purely from metal, and was built approximately three years after the original D.33 model, in 1933.

The D.332 proved successful, ultimately achieving a best speed of over 250 km/h (155 mph), and during the initial tests, where it was flown by test pilot Marcel Doret, the D.332 prototype successfully flew from Paris to Saigon. It did, however, crash on the return flight from Saigon, on 15 January 1935.

== D.333 ==
In 1934, the D.333 was designed, built and flown for the first time. It was different from its predecessors in that it was constructed with a more spacious cabin, and could hold a maximum of 10 passengers. The primary buyer of this model was Air France; however, two of the three planes bought by the latter crashed while flying the distance between Toulouse and Dakar.

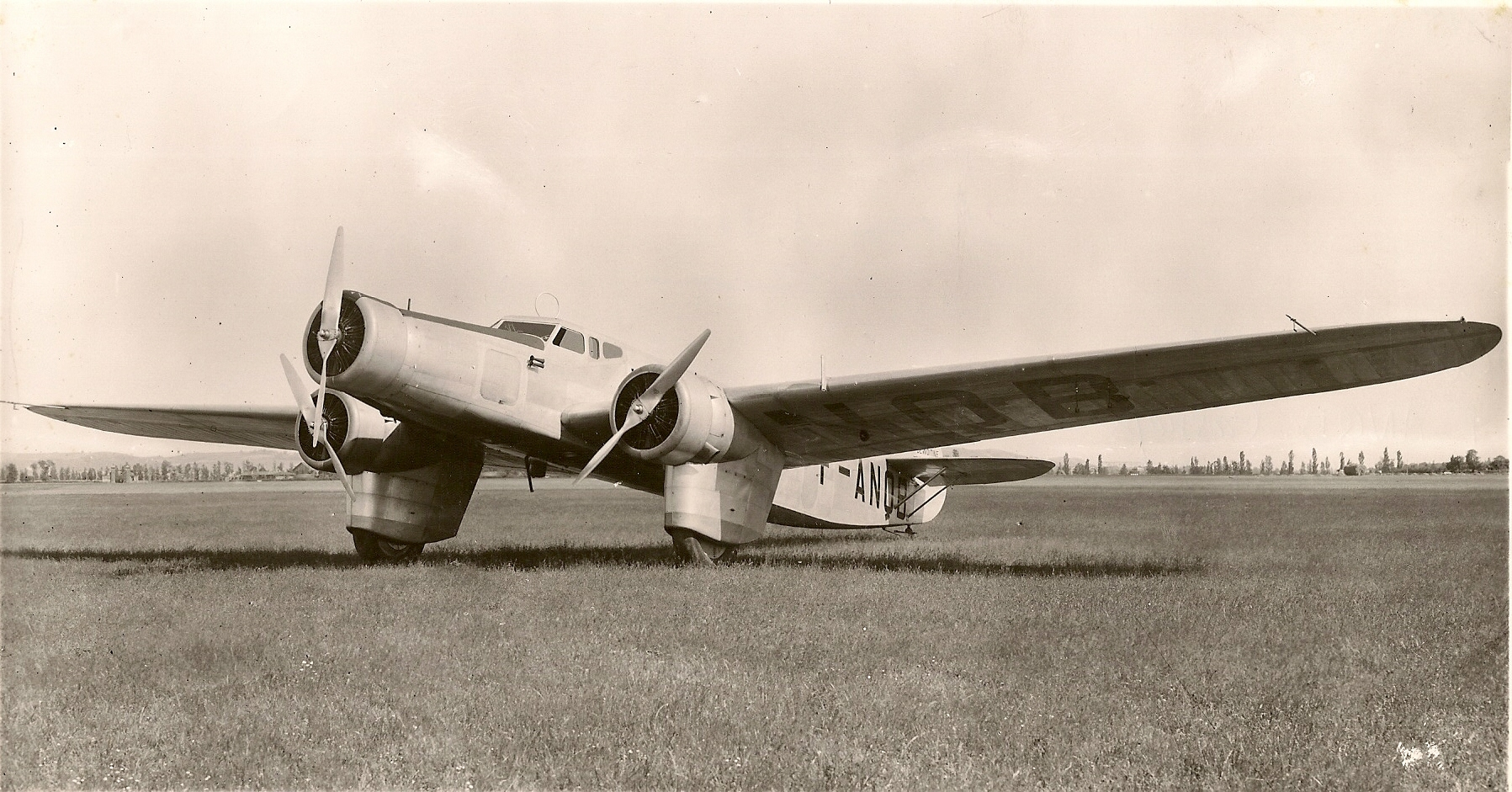
Dewotine D.333 "Cassiopée" F-ANQB Algéria 1938

== D.338 ==
1935-6 saw the drafting and prototype of the D.338. This new model was built with retractable undercarriage, and could carry 22 passengers over a maximum of around 1,950 km (1,210 mi). Fitted with 485 kW (650 hp) Hispano-Suiza 9V16/17 engines, the D.338 could travel at a speed of up to 260 km/h (160 mph).

The D.338 was the first truly successful model in the line, and became widely used by Air France, first for flights within Europe, and later for international flights, between France and various parts of Asia. A total of 31 D.338s were purchased by Air France, and they were used into the Second World War, where they were employed as troop transporters. Following their use in the conflict, only eight aircraft survived. However, despite this, the basic model was still used for years, until more recent builds were designed.

== D.342 and D.620 ==
Dewoitine designed two one-off aircraft based on the D.33 line; the D.342 and the D.620. Very few details relating to the specifics of these two aircraft are known or documented. Both were heavily based on the D.338 in particular.

== Operators ==
France

- Air France

== Specifications ==
Data from Le Trait d'Union, National Advisory Committee for Aeronautics

General characteristics

- Crew: Three (pilot, navigator and radio operator)
- Length: 14.40 m (47 ft 3 in)
- Wingspan: 28.00 m (91 ft 10 in)
- Height: 5.00 m (16 ft 5 in)
- Wing area: 78 m^{2} (840 sq ft)
- Empty weight: 3,100 kg (6,834 lb)
- Gross weight: 9,800 kg (21,605 lb)
- Fuel capacity: 8,300 L (1,800 imp gal; 2,200 US gal)
- Powerplant: 1 × Hispano-Suiza 12Nbr liquid-cooled V12 engine, 480 kW (650 hp)

Performance

- Maximum speed: 235 km/h (146 mph, 127 kn)
- Time to altitude: 53 minutes to 6,000 m (20,000 ft)
