= Joseph-Émile Baeteman =

French priest (1880–1938)

Joseph-Émile Baeteman (September 29, 1880 – 1938) was a French missionary and religious writer. He wrote a dictionary of Amharic (Dictionnaire amarigna-français) that was a pioneer work and became standard for the study of that language.

== Life ==
Joseph Baeteman was born in 1880 in Corbigny, Nièvre. In 1892 he received his missionary education in Troyes and Paris, where he joined the Lazarists. In 1905 he went to Ethiopia for teaching, but he returned to France during World War I, in which he served at the front. In 1919 he returned to Ethiopia, to Gəwala. Around 1920 he founded the Lazarist mission of Mändida, which he left in 1929 due to illness. He then returned to France and wrote several spiritual writings.

== The Dictionnaire ==
In 1929, Baeteman published his Amharic dictionary. It was printed in Dire Dawa (east Ethiopia) and dedicated to Haile Selassie I, who was then still Negus Tafāri Makwennen. The dictionary comprises more than 1000 pages and includes around 1000 proverbs, from a collection made by the Lazarist Jean-Baptiste Coulbeaux. It was based on many sources, including collections of vocabulary made by the Ethiopian Lazarist abba Tesfa Sellassie Welde Gerima.

== Works ==
- 1922: Formation de la jeune fille. 3rd ed. Évreux : Poussin.
- 1923: Grammaire amarigna. Addis-Abéba (Addis Ababa): Imprimerie A. Desvages.
- 1927: Courtes méditations sur la doctrine chrétienne. Luçon: S. Pacteau.
- 1929: Dictionnaire amarigna-français, suivi d'un vocabulaire français-amarigna. Dire-Daoua (Dire Dawa): Imprimerie Saint Lazare.
- 1929: (ed.) Jean-Baptiste Coulbeaux, Histoire politique et religieuse d'Abyssinie depuis les temps les plus reculés jusqu'à l'avénement de Ménélick II. Paris.
- 1930: Au pays du roi Ménélick, Croquis noirs. Lyon: Librairie catholique E. Vitte.
- 1931: Les Lazaristes en Abyssinie 1839-1930. Louvain: Xaveriana.
- 1931: Ames Éthiopiennes. Louvain: Xaveriana.
