= Henri Saint-Pierre-Lespéret =

French politician

- Born: 3 August 1761; Plaisance, Gers, France
- Died: 21 January 1847; Plaisance, Gers, France
- Occupation: Politician
- Parent(s): Dominique Saint-Pierre; Jeanne Ducuing
- Relatives: Antoine Noguès (son-in-law)

Henri Saint-Pierre-Lespéret (3 August 1761 – 21 January 1847) was a French politician. He served as a member of the Corps législatif from 1799 to 1811, representing Gers.

== Early life ==
Henri Saint-Pierre-Lespéret was born on 3 August 1761 in Plaisance, Gers. His father, Dominique Saint-Pierre, was a lawyer in the local parliament. His mother was Lady Jeanne Ducuing.

== Career ==
Saint-Pierre-Lespéret was sent to jail during the Reign of Terror, when he shared a cell with André Chénier. He served as a member of the Corps législatif from 1799 to 1811, representing Gers.

== Death and legacy ==
Saint-Pierre-Lespéret died on 21 January 1847 in his hometown of Plaisance. One of his daughters married General Antoine Noguès.
