= Pierre Cassou-Noguès =

French philosopher and writer (born 1971)

- Born: 1971 (age 54–55); Tunis, Tunisia

Education
- Education: École Normale Supérieure

Philosophical work
- Era: Contemporary philosophy
- Region: Western philosophy
- Institutions: University of Paris VIII

Pierre Cassou-Noguès (born 1971) is a French philosopher and writer.

== Biography ==
He was admitted at the École Normale Supérieure in 1991. He obtained the agrégation in mathematics in 1995 and wrote his PhD in philosophy under the supervision of Jean-Michel Salanskis in 1999. From 2001 to 2011, he was a research fellow at the CNRS. Since 2011, he has been Full Professor at the University of Paris VIII. He is also co-editor of the journal SubStance.

== Research ==
His work is based on a theoretical use of fiction. Pierre Cassou-Nogues uses fiction as a method for exploring the possible and its limits. In this way, he intends to give to philosophy both a speculative scope and a critical impact: fiction enables the philosopher to consider the real in the light of the possible. In his most recent work, he applies this philosophy-fiction to explore the forms of life and modes of subjectivation induced by contemporary technology.

More broadly, his research focusses on four areas.

1. His early research concerns the role of the imaginary (dreams, fictions) in the work of scientists: Kurt Gödel, Norbert Wiener, or brain reading in neuroscience. He relies on the archives of scientists to look for fictions, personal dreams, superstitions sometimes, which interplay with their more serious work/

2. He has also investigated the relationship between imagination and science as it is questioned in French philosophy, as well as the question of the self at the intersection between reason and imagination. His work here concerns the historical epistemology of Brunschvicg, Cavaillès, Albert Lautman, Bachelard and its inheritance in contemporary philosophy.

3. In a series of works halfway between theory and literature, Pierre Cassou-Nogues uses fiction order to describe and conceptualize fields that philosophers tend to ignore, or repress: wasted time, phobias, seashores... Fields that philosophers most often avoid, preferring to talk about work rather than laziness, preferring the noble Angst to this absurd fear that is phobia, or preferring to set foot on firm land, where the tree of science is rooted, rather than exploring uncertain and moving shores.

4. His more recent work explores the contemporary relationship between technology and fiction. In 2019, he published a collection of short stories in which he investigates new forms of life and modes of subjectivation correlated with various technological apparatus. He has co-authored on a web documentary, Welcome to Erewhon, which is an adaptation of the novel Erewhon published by Samuel Butler in 1871. With Paul Harris, and the journal SubStance, he also has contributed to launching a collection of born digital theoretical works

== Works ==
=== Books ===
- Hilbert, Paris, Éditions Les Belles Lettres, coll. « Figures du savoir », 2001, 169 p. ISBN 2-251-76036-9
- De l'expérience mathématique. Essai sur la philosophie des sciences de Jean Cavaillès, Paris, Éditions Vrin, coll. « Problèmes et controverses », 2001, 351 p. ISBN 2-7116-1530-8
- Gödel, Paris, Éditions Les Belles Lettres, coll. « Figures du savoir », 2003, 190 p. ISBN 2-251-76040-7
- Une histoire de machines, de vampires et de fous, Paris, Éditions Vrin, coll. « Matière étrangère », 2007, 219 p. ISBN 2-7116-1884-6
- Les Démons de Gödel. Logique et folie, Paris, Éditions du Seuil, coll. « Science ouverte », 2007, 279 p. ISBN 978-2-02-092339-2 (réédition poche, Points, 2012 et 2015)
- L’Hiver des Feltram, roman, Paris, Éditions MF, coll. « Frictions », 2009, 346 p. ISBN 978-2-91579-438-0
- La Ville aux deux lumières. Géographie imaginaire, Paris, Éditions MF, coll. « Les Mondes possibles », 2009, 139 p. ISBN 978-2-915794-39-7
- Le Bord de l'expérience. Essai de cosmologie, Paris, Presses Universitaires de France, coll. « Métaphysiques », 2010, 155 p. ISBN 978-2-13-057967-0
- Mon zombie et moi. La philosophie comme fiction, Paris, Éditions du Seuil, coll. « L’Ordre philosophique », 2010, 341 p. ISBN 978-2-02-102130-1
- Lire le cerveau. Neuro-science-fiction, Paris, Éditions du Seuil, coll. « La Couleur des idées », 2012, 186 p. ISBN 978-2-02-105054-7
- La Mélodie du tic-tac : et autres bonnes raisons de perdre son temps, Paris, Éditions Flammarion, Hors Collection: publié sous la direction de Benoit Chantre, 2013, 301 p. ISBN 978-2-08-130181-8
- Les Rêves cybernétiques de Norbert Wiener, Paris, Éditions du Seuil, coll. « Science ouverte », 2014, 228 p. ISBN 978-2-02-109028-4
- Métaphysique d'un bord de mer, Paris, Editions Cerf, coll "Passages", 224 p., 2016.
- Un Laboratoire philosophique. Cavaillès et l’épistémologie en France, Éditions Vrin, 2017, 248 p.
- Welcome to Erewhon, a web documentary, co-authored with Stéphane Degoutin and Gwenola Wagon (Irrévérence Films, 2019)
- Technofictions, Paris, Éditions Cerf, 2019, 282 p.

=== Edited collections ===
- Que prouve la science fiction?, Alliage n°60, P. Cassou-Nogues et E. Barot (éd.), juin 2007
- Le concept, le sujet et la science. Cavailles, Canguilhem, Foucault, P. Cassou-Nogues et P. Gillot (éd.), Editions Vrin. coll. Problèmes & Controverses, 2009
- Le sujet digital, C. Larsonneur, A. Regnauld, P. Cassou-Nogues et S. Touiza (éd.), Editions Presses du réel. coll. Labex, 2015

=== Interviews ===
- Logique, fictions et folie, entretien avec A. Wald Lasowski, in Pensées pour le nouveau siècle, Fayard, 2008
