= Dewoitine D.332 =

D.332
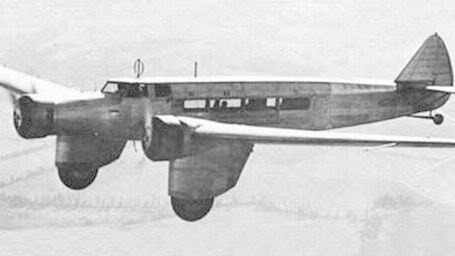
- Dewoitine D.332 F-AMMY "Émeraude"

General information
- Type: Airliner
- Manufacturer: Dewoitine
- Primary user: Air France
- Number built: D.332 1 D.333 3

History
- First flight: 11 July 1933
- Variants: D.338

The Dewoitine D.332 was an eight-passenger airliner designed and built by the French aircraft manufacturer Dewoitine.

The D.332 was an all-metal cantilever low-wing monoplane derived from the long distance Dewoitine D.33. The pilot and co-pilot were seated side by side in an enclosed cabin located forward of the wing's leading edge. A radio operator station was located behind the pilots, and behind that was a cabin for eight passengers. The landing gear had trouser-type fairings on the main gear legs. The D.333 was an improved version of this plane, also serving as an airliner. It was further developed into the D.338 design of the late 1930s, which did away with the prominent fixed landing gear of the D.332 and D.333.

== Design ==
The D.332 was an all-metal cantilever low-wing monoplane. It was derived from the long-distance aircraft Dewoitine D.33, which held a world speed record during the early 1930s. The two aircraft shared similar aerodynamic characteristics, both aircraft having a monospar wing with a stressed leading edge and a semi-monocoque fuselage. The most apparent change of the D.332 was the addition of two lateral engines; several other major changes included the adoption of an enlarged fuselage (to accommodate a passenger cabin) and various modifications to the landing gear. The aircraft also demonstrated favourable controllability and was considered to be relatively safe amongst its peers. It was also suitably outfitted to conduct night flights, including the presence of a retractable search light.

The wing of the aircraft was mounted low on the fuselage and possessed a relatively high aspect ratio of 8.8 along with a tapering plan form complete with nearly elliptical wing tips. When combined with a fineness ratio of 26.5, it generated relatively little drag. The fineness ratio of the aircraft was almost absolutely consistent throughout a broad range of angles of attack. The wing sections were carefully designed to maximise efficiency and reduce torsion to a minimum. The wing structure was based around a single spar with a stressed leading edge. This spar was divided into six sections in addition to the central section, which was integral to the fuselage; the leading and trailing edges were similarly split. The tips of the ribs formed a study box.

The spar, which was located at one third of the chord from the leading edge, had wide duralumin flanges, the width and thickness of which diminished along the span in proportion to the variation of the bending movements. These flanges are joined at different points by special steel and duralumin fittings that could transmit stresses of up to 1,000,000 kg (2,200,000 lb). The leading edge comprised box formers with longitudinal stringers and an auxiliary spar at the extreme front. It was joined to the main spar via continuous hinges that used piano wire and hinge pins. Similar construction was used for the trailing edge, which terminates at the rear in an auxiliary spar to which both the fixed central portions of the trailing edge and the ailerons are hinged upon. Each aileron was divided into three sections in order to tolerate deformations of the wing without exerting too much force on the aircraft's rigid flight controls. These consisted of three horns and three rods located at the top of the wing.

The fuselage was divided into three individual sections; the forward section contained the cockpit, radio operation's station, and a baggage compartment directly underneath the central engine's oil tank of central engine. Just aft of the wing spar was the central section that comprised the passenger cabin and toilets. The rear of the fuselage contained a larger baggage compartment and several doors for inspection and communication purposes. The positioning of the wing spar between the cockpit and the passenger cabin made it possible for the latter to make use of the full height of the fuselage, which led to it having a slightly rounded ceiling. Extensive use of plywood was made around the cabin. Diagonal bracing using small round wires had been used as to not obstruct external visibility for the occupants. The cabin was typically fitted with two rows of four comfortable chairs, each having adjustable backs and transformable into recliners or even into couches. Each position was provided with a compact folding table and individual ventilation.

The D.332 was powered by a total of three Hispano-Suiza 9V air-cooled radial engines. These engines drove twin-bladed Levasseur propellers and were fitted with circular exhaust manifolds. Fuel was stored in a total of three tanks, one for each engine; these were located behind the main spar and just in front of the cockpit. All three oil tanks were installed behind the firewall. The engine bearers, which comprised chrome-nickel tubing with large ribs that reinforced the welded joints, were mounted on noise-dampening blocks. Fire extinguishers were also present.

The D.332 was fitted with retractable landing gear, giving an increase of 30 to 40 km (19 to 25 mi) per hour in the aircraft's maximum speed compared to the fixed landing gear of the preceding D.33. This landing gear, which had a relatively wide track, was fitted with independent wheels. Underneath each engine nacelle was an elektron fork that was hinged to the lower flange of the wing spar. This fork guided a pair of Liessier hydraulic brakes that were balanced and terminated by two bearings on which the axle is mounted. A rod joined the engine bearer to the end of this fork so that recoil could be absorbed. The whole unit was enclosed in a fairing. When retracted, the gear was designed to embed itself into sections of the wing and engine cowling. The tail wheel was outfitted with an oleo-pneumatic shock absorber and a swivelling fork. A Messier-built brake system was used

== Operational history ==
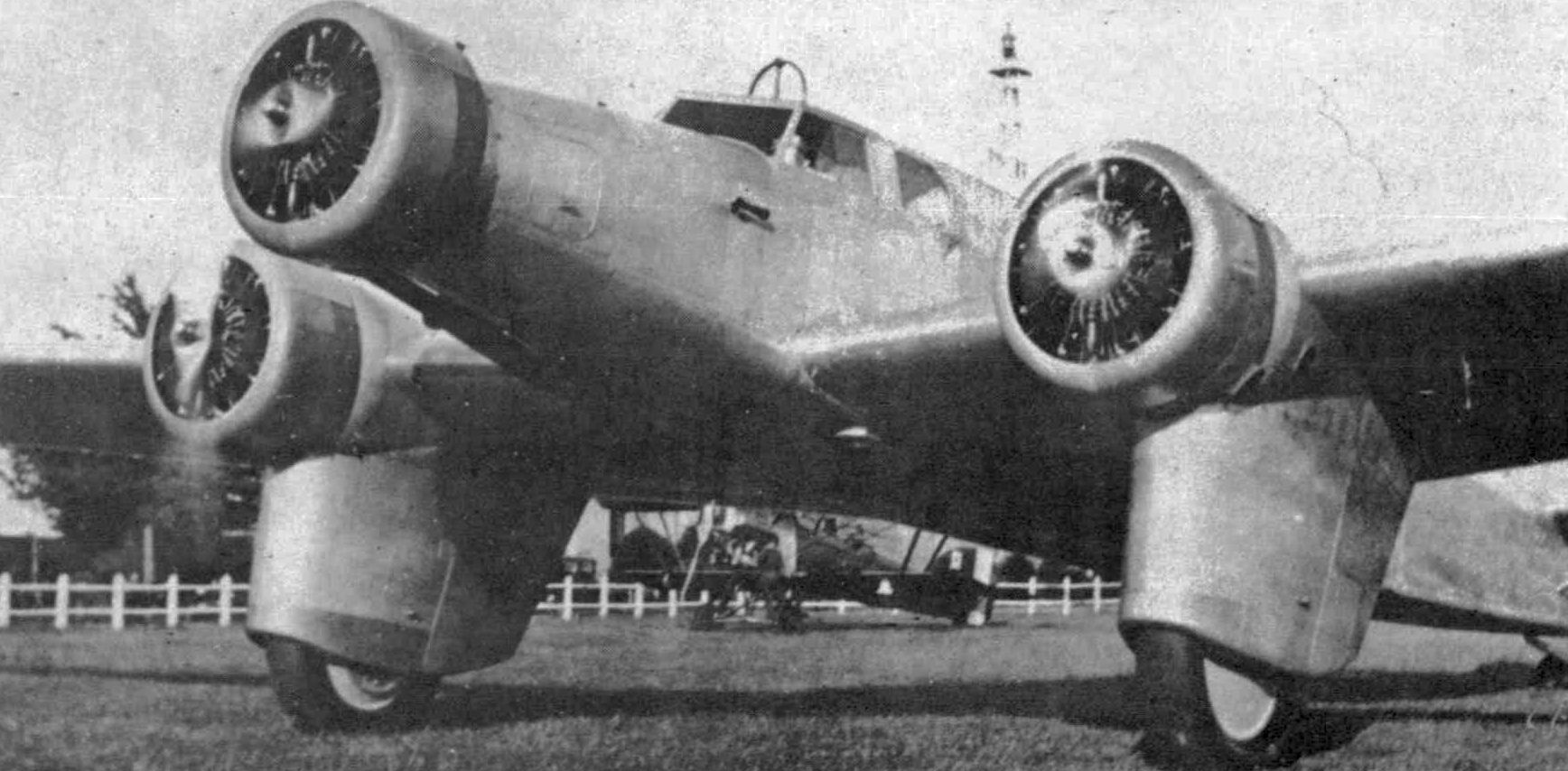
A Dewoitine D.332

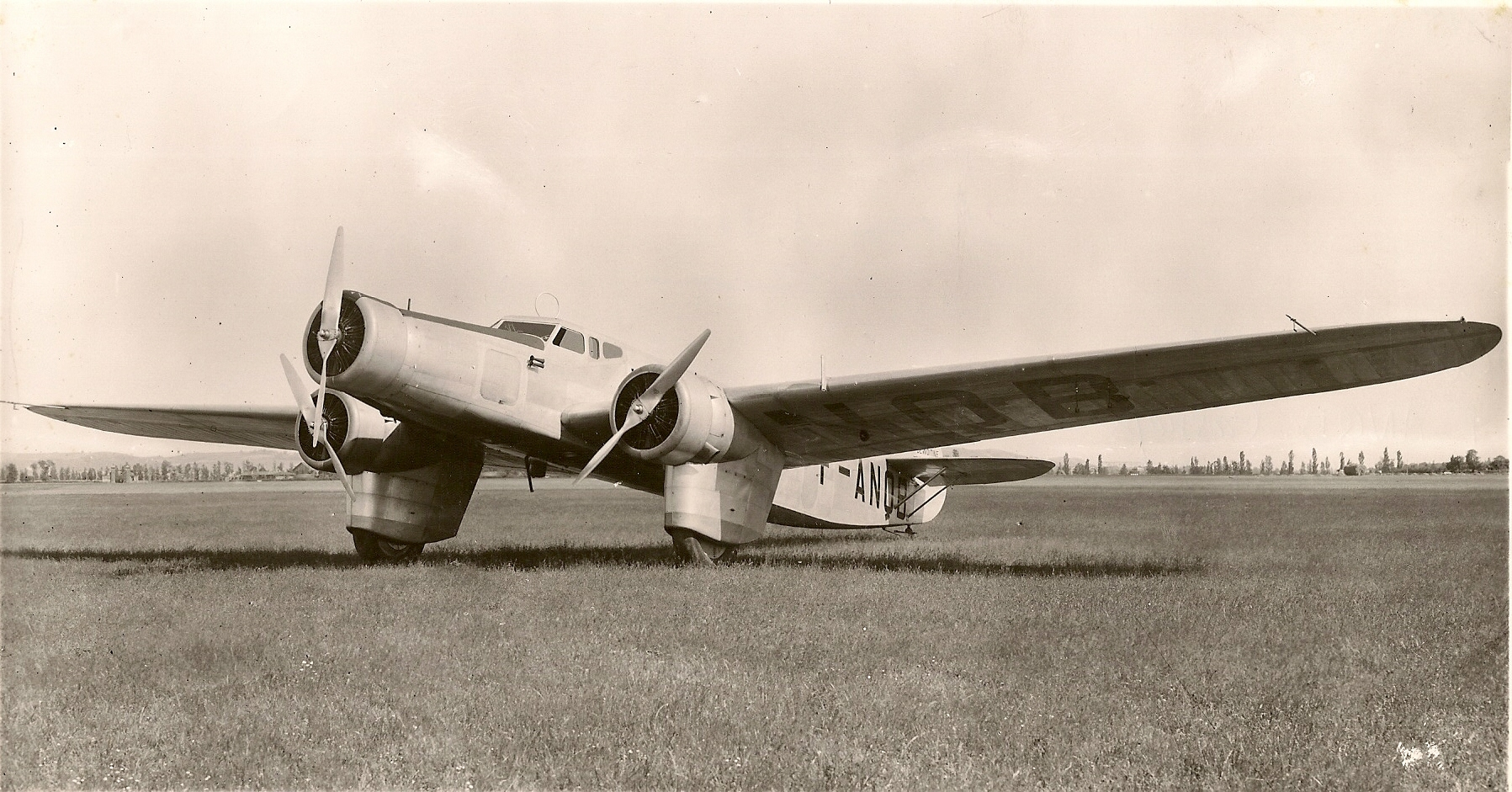
D.333 in 1938

The D.332 was specifically designed to meet a requirement issued by the French flag carrier Air France, which sought a capable new airliner for use on its route to French Indochina. In several respects, the aircraft proved to be capable of greater performance than the requirement had stipulated, such as achieving a cruising speed (while at 55% of engine power) of 250 kilometres per hour (160 mph; 130 kn) instead of the targeted 220 kilometres per hour (140 mph; 120 kn), while the single engine-out altitude performance of 2,500 metres (8,200 feet) was surpassed substantially, the aircraft being able to maintain level flight at 3,500 metres (11,500 feet) instead. This performance was achieved despite the aircraft carrying a payload that was heavier than specified.

The aircraft first flew on 11 July 1933, powered by three Hispano-Suiza 9V radial engines. The prototype was named Émeraude ("Emerald" in French) and carried out demonstration flights around European capitals. Émeraude gained a world class record on 7 September 1933 when it flew a 1,000-kilometre (621-mile) course with a useful load of 2,000 kilograms (4,400 pounds) at an average speed of 160 kilometres per hour (99 mph; 86 kn).

Despite the loss of the prototype during a proving flight in an accident, Air France decided to order three aircraft of an improved version, designated the D.333. The D.333 was a heavier and strengthened ten-seat version, the fully loaded weight being increased by 1,650 kilograms (3,640 lb). The three D.333s were used on the Toulouse-Dakar sector of the Air France South American route for several years. Two of these aircraft were transferred to the Argentine Air Force after World War II and used along with two D.338s. Argentina had two of each type.

== Accidents and incidents ==
On 21 December 1933, the prototype Emeraude, registered as F-AMMY, set out for Saigon on a proving flight for Air France's route to French Indochina, where it arrived at Saigon on 28 December 1933. Emeraude departed Saigon on 5 January 1934 to begin its return flight to France. It made stops at Karachi in British India, Baghdad in Iraq, and Marseille and Lyon in France. On the final leg of the flight, from Lyon to Paris-Le Bourget Airport outside Paris, it crashed on 15 January 1934 in a violent snowstorm into a hill at Corbigny, France, only 400 km (249 mi) from its destination, killing all ten people on board, including the director of Air France, Maurice Noguès, and the governor-general of French Indochina, Pierre Pasquier. The crash, which destroyed the aircraft, probably occurred due to icing.

== Variants ==
- D.332: Emeraude, prototype aircraft with eight seats. One built.
- D.333: Production aircraft with ten seats. Three built.
- D.338: Improved version with retractable undercarriage.

== Operators ==
France

- Air France

Argentina

- Lineas Aereas del Estado
- Fuerza Aerea Argentina

== Specifications (D.332) ==
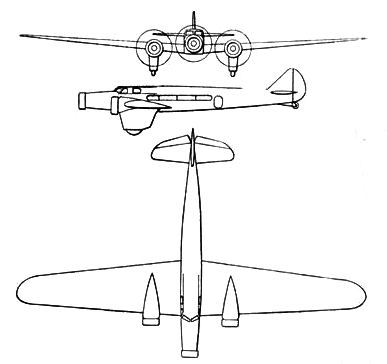
Dewoitine D.332 3-view drawing from L'Aerophile October 1933

Data from The Illustrated Encyclopedia of Aircraft, Flight : The New Dewoitine Transport Monoplane, D.332, Aviafrance : Dewoitine D.332 'Emeraude'

General characteristics

- Crew: Four (two pilots, radio operator and a mechanic)
- Capacity: Eight passengers
- Length: 18.95 m (62 ft 2 in)
- Wingspan: 29 m (95 ft 2 in)
- Height: 5.356 m (17 ft 7 in)
- Wing area: 96 m^{2} (1,030 sq ft)
- Empty weight: 5,280 kg (11,640 lb)
- Max takeoff weight: 9,350 kg (20,613 lb)
- Powerplant: 3 × Hispano-Suiza 9V nine-cylinder air-cooled radial piston engines, 429 kW (575 hp) each
- Propellers: 2-bladed variable-pitch propellers

Performance

- Maximum speed: 300 km/h (190 mph, 160 kn)
- Cruise speed: 250 km/h (160 mph, 130 kn)
- Range: 2,000 km (1,200 mi, 1,100 nmi)
- Service ceiling: 6,300 m (20,700 ft)
- Time to altitude: 4,000 m (13,000 ft) in 17 minutes and 30 seconds
