= Jean-François-Xavier Noguès =

French general and politician

- Born: 3 December 1769; Castelnau-Rivière-Basse, Hautes-Pyrénées, France
- Died: 9 January 1808 (aged 38); Castelnau-Rivière-Basse, Hautes-Pyrénées, France
- Parent(s): Antoine Noguès; Marie Rangon
- Relatives: Antoine Noguès (brother)

Jean-François-Xavier Noguès (3 December 1769 – 9 January 1808) was a French general and politician. He was an aide-de-camp to Louis Bonaparte. He served as a member of the Corps législatif from 1805 to 1808.

== Early life ==
Jean-François-Xavier Noguès was born on 3 December 1769 in Castelnau-Rivière-Basse, Hautes-Pyrénées. His father, Antoine Noguès, was a landowner in Castelnau-Rivière-Basse; his mother was Marie Rangon (or Ranson). One of his brothers, Antoine Noguès, also became a general.

== Career ==
Noguès joined the Army of the Eastern Pyrenees on 5 November 1791. He became a lieutenant on 2 March 1792 and a captain on 4 April 1792. He was wounded in Le Boulou in 1893, and promoted to battalion chief. He was also wounded in Saint-Laurent de la Monga. He became adjutant general on 4 November 1894, and he was appointed as Chief of the Defence Staff of the Army of the Midi in 1795. He served alongside Jean Lannes, and he was wounded in the battle of Pô in 1800. He appointed as brigadier general on 28 July 1800.

Noguès served in Martinique and Saint Lucia in 1802, when he was captured by the English and sent back to France. He commanded the Charente in June 1803, and he became an aide-de-camp to Louis Bonaparte in 1804. He was appointed as a divisional general in February 1805. When Louis Bonaparte left Paris in November 1805, Noguès became its commander.

He served as Lieutenant Governor of Saint Lucia from 1802 to 1803.

Noguès was elected as a member of the Corps législatif from 21 September 1805, and he became its president on 6 November 1806. He was also appointed as a constable of France, and as the governor of The Hague by Louis Bonaparte in 1806.

Noguès was a commander of the Legion of Honour.

== Death ==
Noguès retired at the Château Montus, also known as Château de Montas, in his hometown of Castelnau-Rivière-Basse, where he died on 9 January 1808.
