= Dewoitine D.338 =

French passenger airliner

D.338
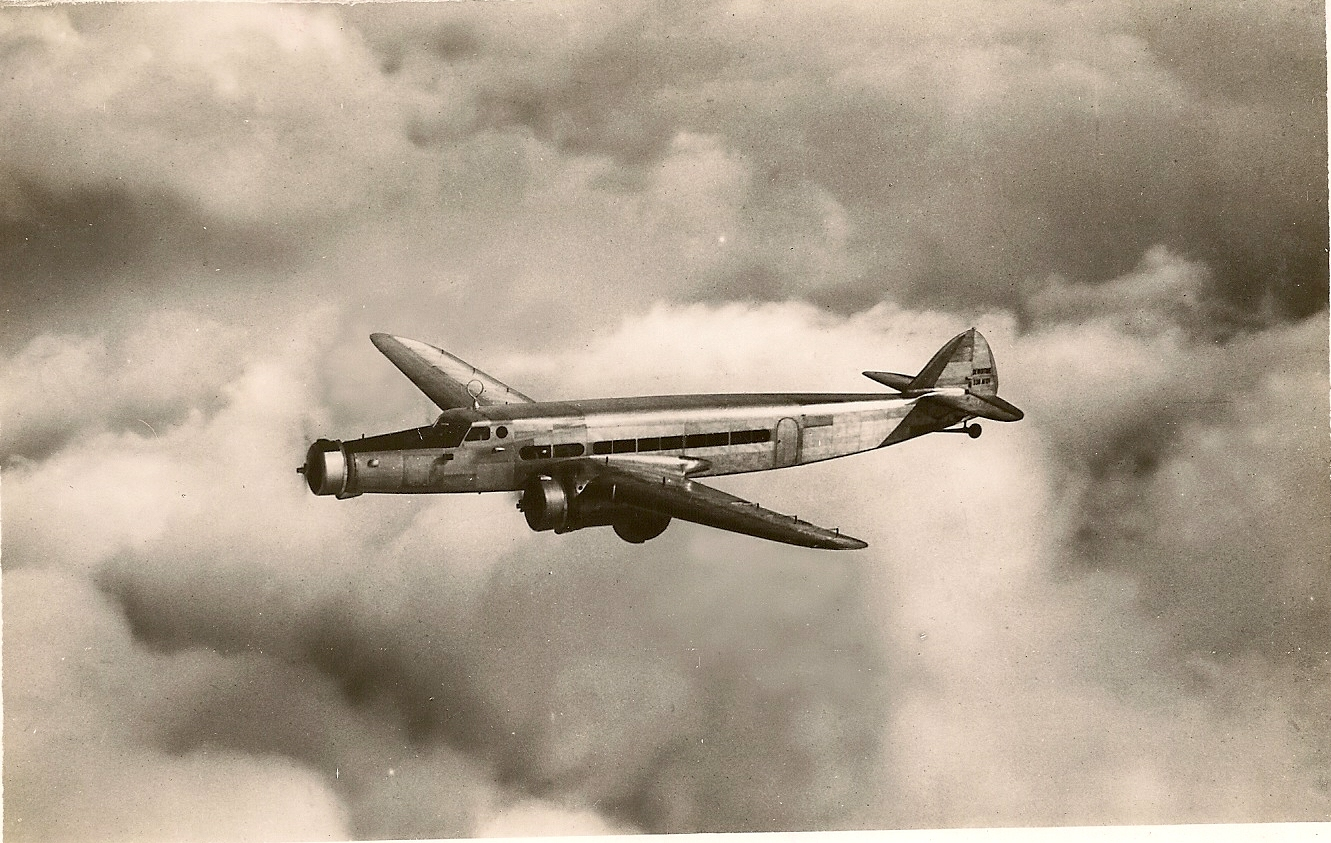

General information
- Type: Airliner
- Manufacturer: Dewoitine
- Primary user: Air France
- Number built: D.338 – 30; D.342 – 1 D.620 – 1

History
- First flight: 9 August 1935
- Developed from: D.333

The Dewoitine D.338 was a 1930s French 22-passenger airliner built by Dewoitine. The D.338 was a late-1930s French airliner and served on long-distance routes. When World War II began it was pressed into military service.

The D.338 was developed from the Dewoitine D.333.The more advanced D.620 prototype design was based on the D.338, leading to the production of one D.342.

== Design and development ==
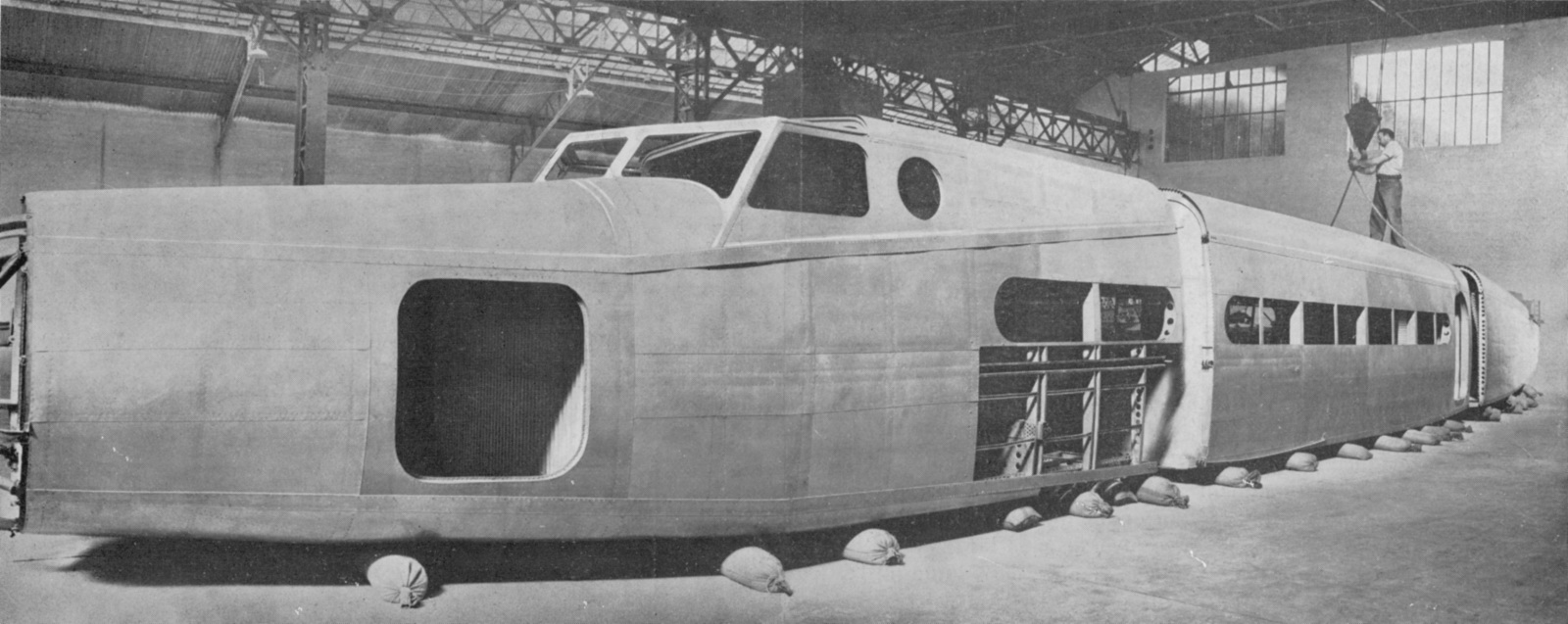
Assembly of the fuselage of a Dewoitine D.338 in 1934. Built in duralium, the aircraft differs from the earlier D.332 / D.333 by its round window in the cockpit.

Dewoitine began a series of three-engined airliners with the Dewoitine D.332 of 1933, of which a single example was built, which was destroyed in a crash when returning from a record-breaking journey from Paris to Saigon. This was followed by three D.333s, which were heavier than the D.332 and carried more passengers, the first of which flew in January 1935.

In 1933, work began on a derivative of the D.332 with a retractable undercarriage, the D.335, to meet the requirements of Air France and the Belgian airline SABENA, but the crash of the D.332 resulted in a redesign of the aircraft's structure being needed. Work on the D.335 was therefore suspended, with work on a new design for SABENA incorporating the required structural improvements, the D.338, beginning in 1934. Dewoitine could not meet the tight timescales required by SABENA, however, and the Belgian airline cancelled its order on 15 March 1935. Despite this setback, Emile Dewoitine decided to continue construction of the prototype D.338.

Like the D.332 and D.333, the D.338 was a low-wing cantilever monoplane of all-metal construction. It was larger and heavier than the D.333, with wingspan increasing by 0.57 m (1 ft 10 in) and length by 2.93 m (9 ft 7 in). The aircraft were powered by three 650 hp (480 kW) Hispano-Suiza 9V16/17 radial engines (license-built versions of the American Wright R-1820 Cyclone) driving constant-speed propellers. (Note: The port and centre engines rotated in a clockwise direction when viewed from the rear, while the starboard engine rotated anti-clockwise.) The mainwheels of the aircraft's retractable tailwheel undercarriage retracted into the engine nacelles, and were enclosed by streamlined fairings. When operating over short-range European routes, the aircraft could carry 22 passengers in two cabins. Passenger load dropped to 18 and 15 for medium range services in South America and to North Africa respectively, and to 12 passengers for services to the Far East, with six seats that could be converted into sleeping berths.

The first prototype made its maiden flight in the hands of test pilot Marcel Doret on 9 August 1935. Initially, the prototype suffered from serious problems with longitudinal stability, and the aircraft was tested with several combinations of revised tail surfaces and fuselage–wing fairings before the problems were resolved. On confirmation of the D.338s satisfactory performance, a series of orders were placed by Air France and the French government, with 31 D.338s built in total.

=== D.620 and D.342 ===
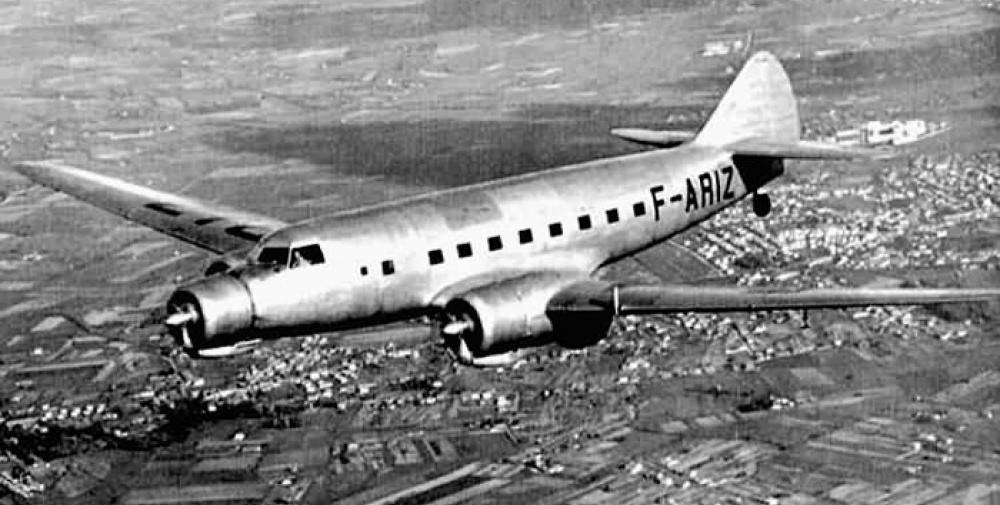
Air France Dewoitine D.342

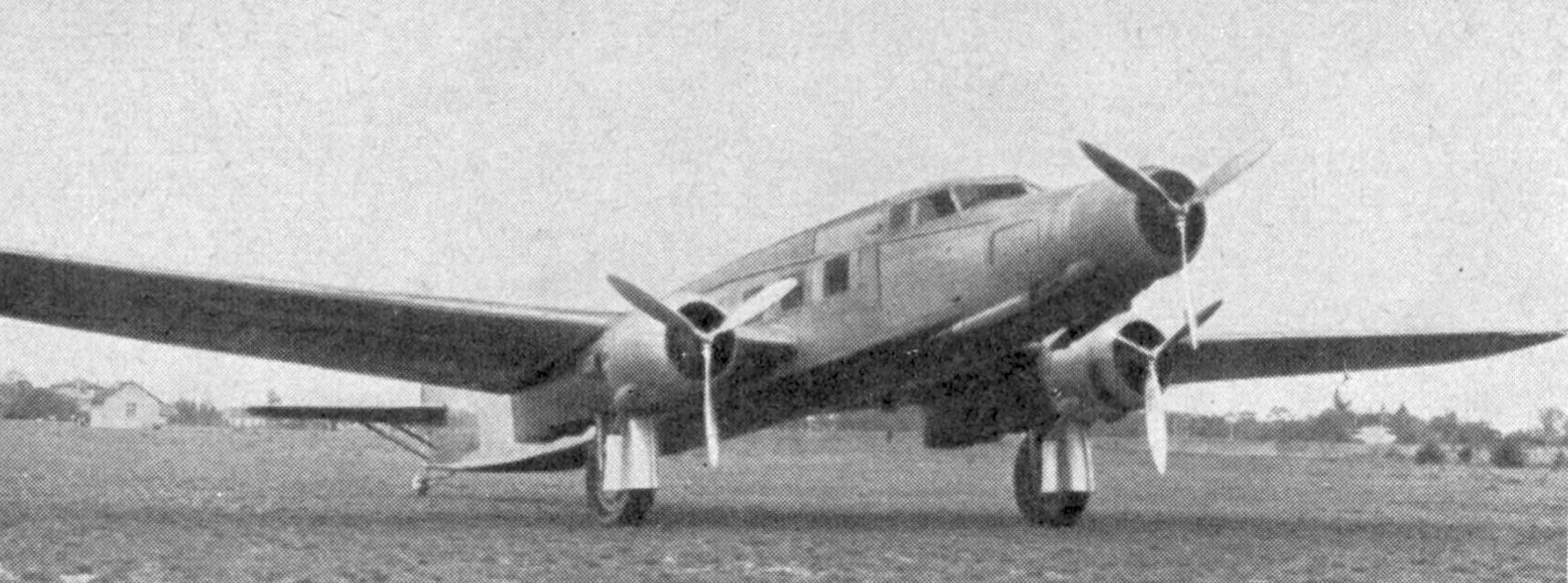
Dewoitine D.620 photo from L'Aerophile February 1936

The Dewoitine D.620 was designed to meet a 1933 French government requirement for an airliner to carry 30 passengers, and was powered by three Gnome-Rhône 14K radial engines rated at 865 hp (645 kW). A single prototype was built, first flying on 22 October 1935, and suffered similar stability problems to the prototype D.338. Air France were not interested in the D.620, being satisfied with the D.338, and no production followed. In 1936, Emile Dewoitine proposed the production of a more advanced derivative of the D.620 with an elliptical section monocoque fuselage and more powerful engines. The proposal was accepted by the French government, and in 1937, after Dewoitine had resigned from his company which had been nationalised as part of SNCAM, the new type was designated D.342. The D.342 prototype, powered by three 950 hp (710 kW) Gnome-Rhône 14N engines, made its maiden flight on 23 November 1938.

== Operational service ==
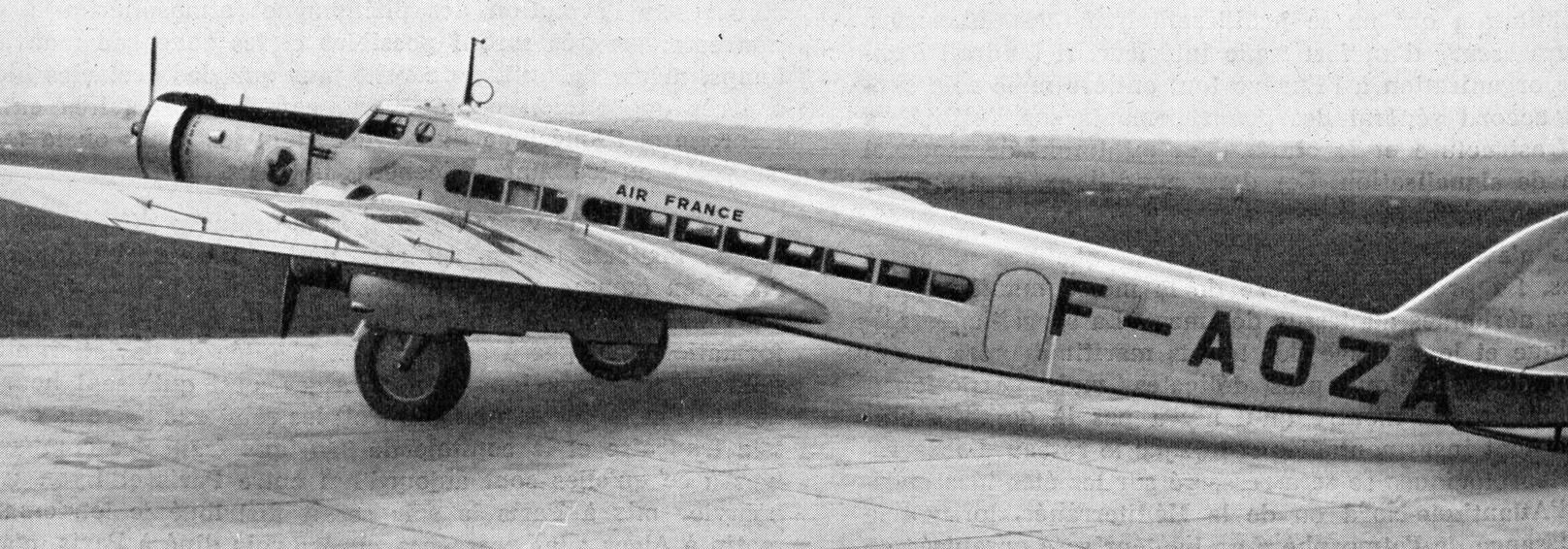
D.338 in 1936

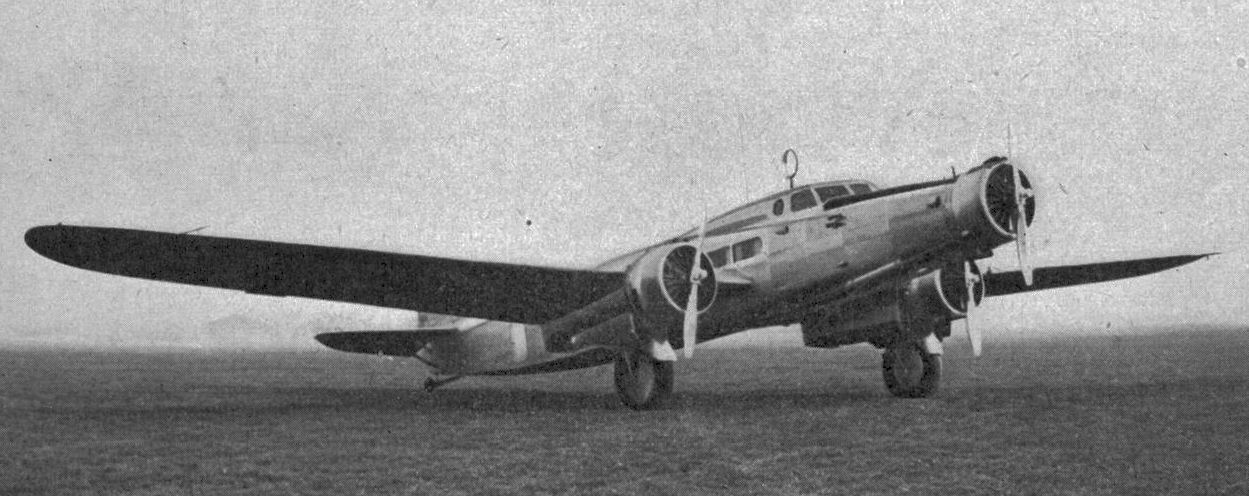
A D.338 in 1938

The prototype D.338 received its certificate of airworthiness on 26 June 1936, and entered into service with Air France on the Paris–Lyon–Marseille route on 13 July 1936. The first four production aircraft were constructed in 1937, with 20 delivered by the end of 1938 and 29 by the end of 1939. Air France used the D.338 on routes within Europe, on services to Dakar, Senegal (via Casablanca), and on its transcontinental route to French Indochina, connecting Paris and Saigon, with the service extending to Hong Kong from August 1938. Two D.338s were sent to South America in 1939 to operate on Air France's South American services.

The outbreak of the Second World War resulted in 12 Air France D.338s being requisitioned by the French Air Force, joining two aircraft already operated by the air force for use as long-range transports. Following the Armistice of 22 June 1940, the Vichy French government set up a civil liaison service, which continued to operate the D.338. The two aircraft operating in South America and three aircraft operating the French Indochina service were unable to return to France following the Armistice, with the two South American aircraft sold to Argentina in 1941. Several were used to operate a service from Tunis to Casablanca via Algiers. When British Commonwealth forces invaded Syria and Lebanon in June 1941, seven D.338s and the sole D.342 were used for flights to Syria. Four D.338s were destroyed during the Syria-Lebanon campaign, while a further two aircraft were captured in Beirut and used by the Free French Lignes Aériennes Militaires for services between Syria and French Equatorial Africa. The sole D.342 survived the Syria-Lebanon campaign, but was destroyed when it broke up in mid-air on 27 September 1942.

Following the Allied invasion of North Africa in November 1942, Germany occupied Vichy France. The part of the Air France fleet in mainland France were seized by Germany, and seven D.338s were recorded officially as being "leased" to the German airline Deutsche Luft Hansa. Several of these aircraft were unserviceable, and only four D.338s were given German registrations and flown to Germany. Deutsche Luft Hansa made little use of the D.338s, considering them unsuitable for its purposes. The eight D.338s in North Africa in November 1942 came under Free French control and continued to serve on the Algiers–Casablanca–Dakar route. The nine D.338s that survived the war rejoined the re-established Air France, being used on Paris-Nice and trans-Mediterranean services until the last D.338s were retired in 1949.

== Variants ==
D.338
Main production version, 30 built.
D.342
One aircraft built in 1939 with improved lines and room for 24-passengers, powered by three 682 kW (915 hp) Gnome-Rhône 14N radial engines. Delivered to Air France in 1942.
D.620
Development of the D.338 with three supercharged 656 kW (880 hp) Gnome-Rhône 14Krsd radial engines and room for 30 passengers, one built but not delivered.

== Operators ==
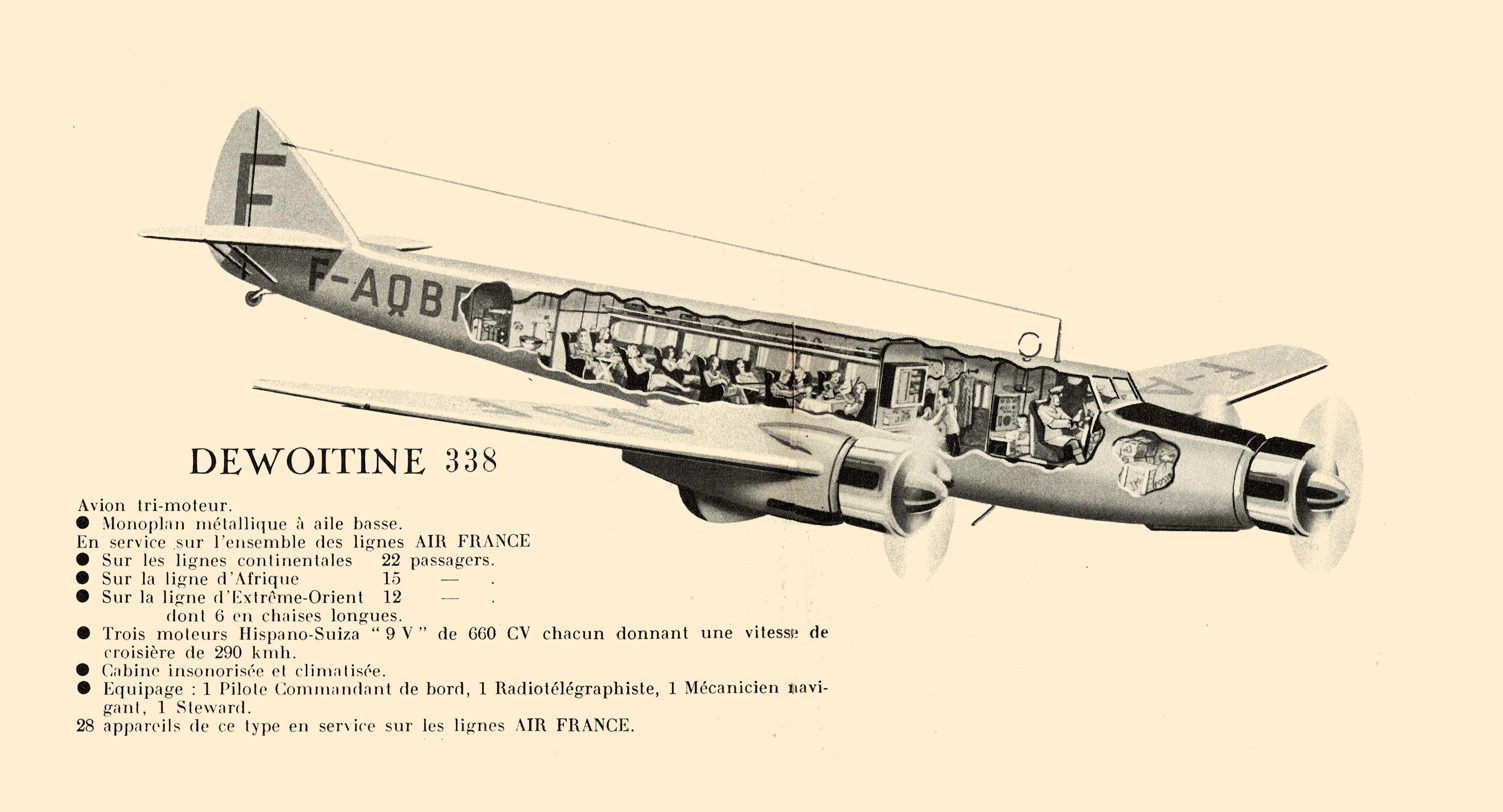
Publicity poster for the D.338 airliner by Air France, 1939.

Argentina

- The Argentine Air Force acquired two Dewoitine 338s in 1941: F-AQBT Ville de Chartres and F-AQBR Ville de Pau. Both planes were discarded in 1947.

France

- Air France
- Lignes Aériennes Militaires (LAM), a Free French line, flew 338s between Beirut and Brazzaville, French Congo, during World War II.
- French Air Force

Germany

- Lufthansa flew seven D.338s acquired by the Germans during World War II.

== Accidents and incidents ==
On 2 May 1939, an Air France D.338 (registration F-ARIC) encountered sudden icing conditions during a flight from Dakar, Senegal, to Casablanca, French Morocco, and crashed near Argana, French Morocco, killing all nine people on board. As a result, several D.338s were fitted with pneumatic deicing boots.

== Specifications (D.338) ==
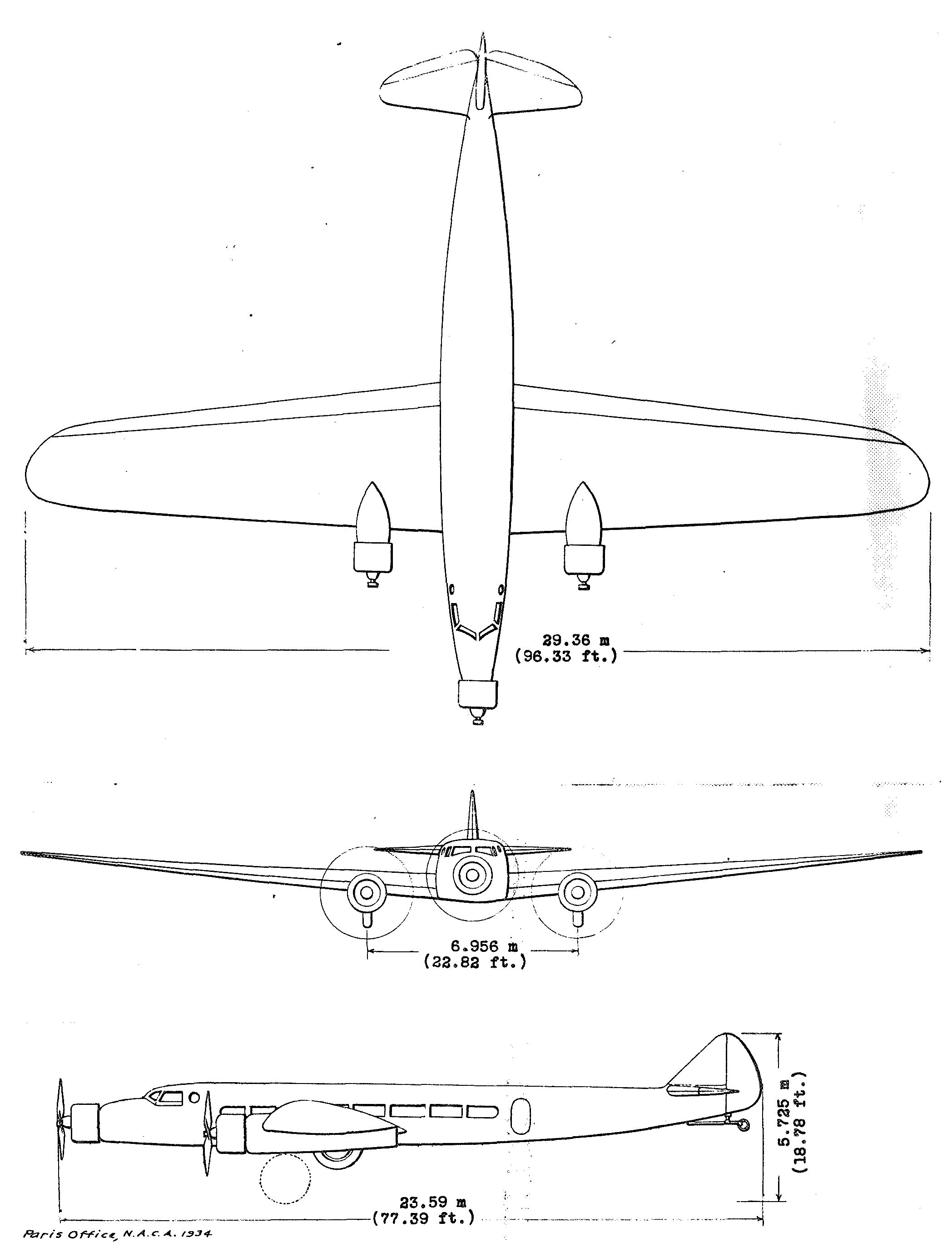
3-view of the D.620 version

Data from Les Dewoitine D.338

General characteristics

- Crew: 3–4
- Capacity: 12, 15, 18, or 22 depending on route
- Length: 22.13 m (72 ft 7 in)
- Wingspan: 29.36 m (96 ft 4 in)
- Height: 5.57 m (18 ft 3 in)
- Wing area: 99.0 m^{2} (1,066 sq ft)
- Empty weight: 7,764 kg (17,117 lb)
- Max takeoff weight: 10,992 kg (24,233 lb)
- Powerplant: 3 × Hispano-Suiza 9V-16 / Hispano-Suiza 9V-17 9-cylinder air-cooled radial engines, 480 kW (650 hp) each (takeoff power)

Performance

- Maximum speed: 310 km/h (190 mph, 170 kn)
- Cruise speed: 260 km/h (160 mph, 140 kn)
- Range: 2,000 km (1,200 mi, 1,100 nmi)
- Service ceiling: 4,900 m (16,100 ft)
- Time to altitude: 18 min 56 s to 3,000 m (9,800 ft)

== Bibliography ==
- Danel, Raymond; Cuny, Jean (1982). Les Avions Dewotine. Docavia (in French). Paris: Éditions Larivère.
- Espérou, Robert (June 1989). "Les Dewoitine D.338" [The Dewoitine D.338]. Le Fana de l'Aviation (in French). No. 235. pp. 30–35.
- Espérou, Robert (July 1989). "Les Dewoitine D.338 (2 et fin)" [The Dewoitine D.338 (Part 2)]. Le Fana de l'Aviation (in French). No. 236. pp. 14–20.
- Grey, C. G.; Bridgman, Leonard (1938). Jane's All the World's Aircraft 1938. London: Sampson Low, Marston & Company, Ltd.
- The Illustrated Encyclopedia of Aircraft (Part Work 1982-1985). Orbis Publishing.
- Munson, Kenneth (1972). Airliners between the wars 1919-39. New York: The Macmillan Co.
- de Narbonne, Roland (December 2007). "Les grands trimoteurs Dewoitine: La légende et la tragédie". Le Fana de l'Aviation (in French). No. 457. pp. 36–48.
- Neulen, Hans Werner (March 2003). "Un grue dans la tempête: la Lufthansa durant la Second Guerre mondiale: 5 – 1943, appareils de prise et perte de substance". Avions (in French). No. 120. pp. 16–25.
- Ricco, Philippe (January–February 2011). "Dewoitine 342: Première partie". Avions (in French). No. 179. pp. 20–35.
- Ricco, Philippe (March–April 2011). "Dewoitine 342: Deuxième partie". Avions (in French). No. 180. pp. 36–44.
- Stroud, John (1966). European Transport Aircraft since 1910. London: Putnam.
- Stroud, John (September 1987). "Wings of Peace". Aeroplane Monthly. Vol. 15, no. 9. pp. 488–493.
