= Corbigny =

- Commune
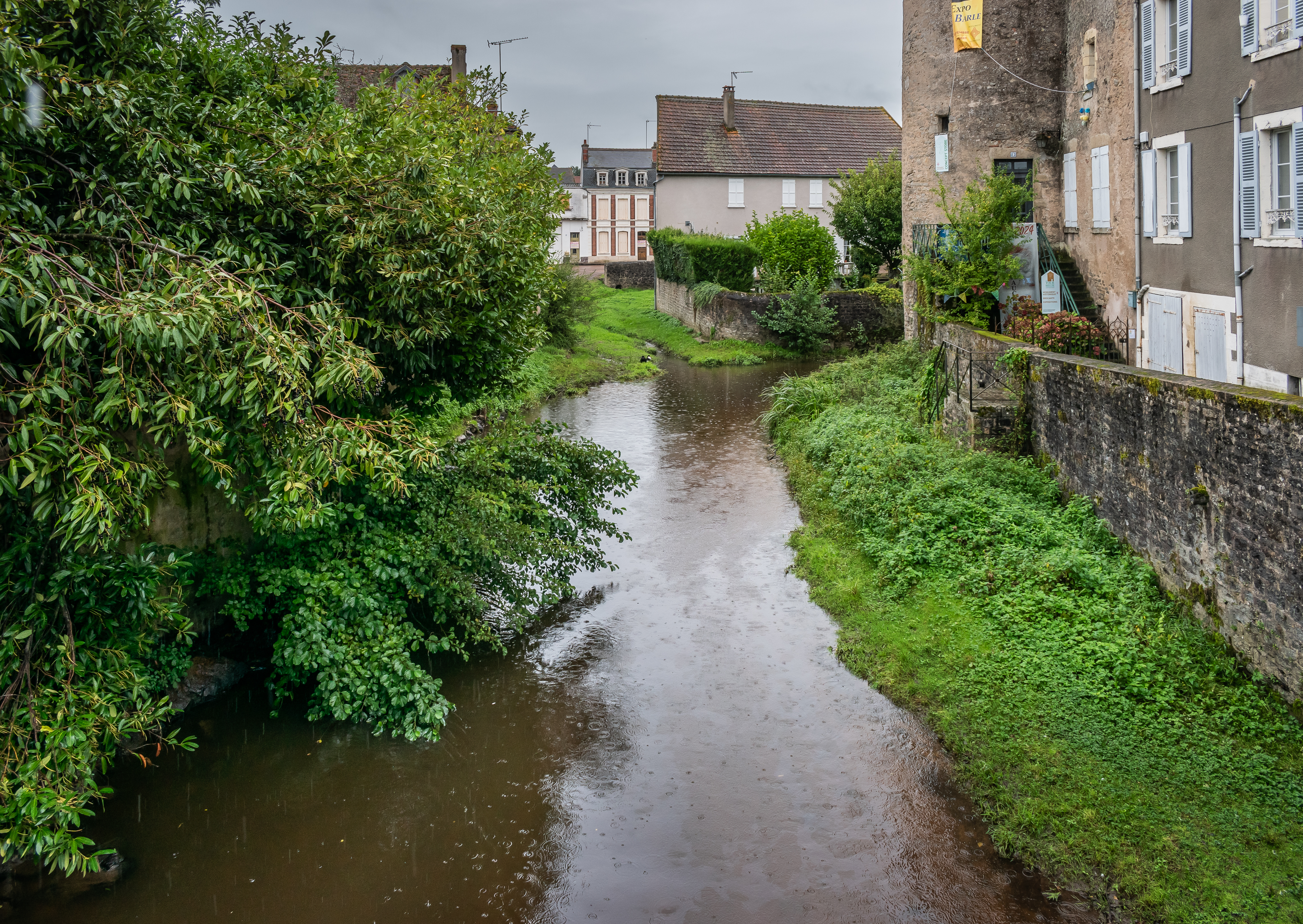
- The Anguison river in Corbigny

- Coat of arms
- Location of Corbigny
- Location within France Location within Bourgogne-Franche-Comté
- Coordinates: 47°15′27″N 3°41′03″E
- Country: France
- Region: Bourgogne-Franche-Comté
- Department: Nièvre
- Arrondissement: Clamecy
- Canton: Corbigny
- Intercommunality: Tannay-Brinon-Corbigny

Government
  - Mayor (2020–2026): Maryse Peltier
- Area^{1}: 20.06 km^{2} (7.75 sq mi)
- Highest elevation: 275 m (902 ft)
- Lowest elevation: 182 m (597 ft)
- Population (2023): 1,327
  - Density: 66.15/km^{2} (171.3/sq mi)
- Time zone: UTC+01:00 (CET)
  - Summer (DST): UTC+02:00 (CEST)
- INSEE/Postal code: 58083 /58800
- ^{1} French Land Register data, which excludes lakes, ponds, glaciers > 1 km^{2} (0.386 sq mi or 247 acres) and river estuaries.

Corbigny (French pronunciation: [kɔʁbiɲi]) is a commune in the Nièvre department in central France. The residents of Corbigny are known as Corbigeois in French.

== Geography ==
Corbigny is located at the western end of the Morvan hills and is one of the five entry points of Parc naturel régional du Morvan. The river Anguison, a tributary of the Yonne, flows through the town. Corbigny station has rail connections to Auxerre and Laroche-Migennes.

== History ==
The city used to be one of the first steps for pilgrims starting from Vézelay on the road to Santiago de Compostela.

The librettist and poet Franc-Nohain (1872-1934) was born in Corbigny.

On 15 January 1934, a Dewoitine tri-motor commercial airliner, the 'Emeraude' (Emerald), returning from Indochina, crashed into a hillside near Corbigny, killing all ten people aboard, including the director of Air France, Maurice Noguès, and the governor-general of the colony of French Indochina, Pierre Pasquier.

== Monuments ==
The Saint Léonard Abbaye which was built in the 18th century is one of the city's most famous attractions. A festival of classical music takes place in this Abbaye every summer.

== Architecture ==
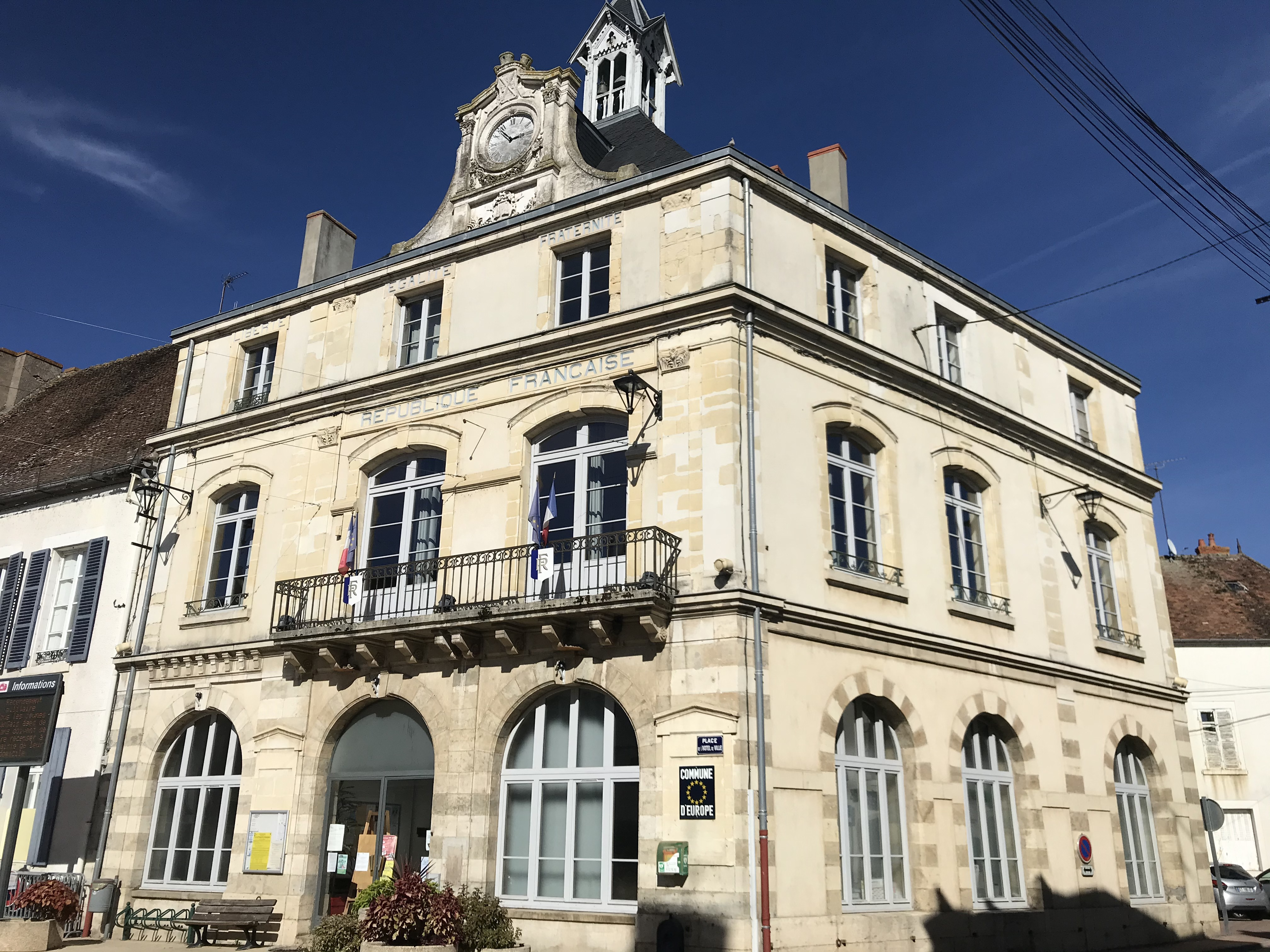
Town hall

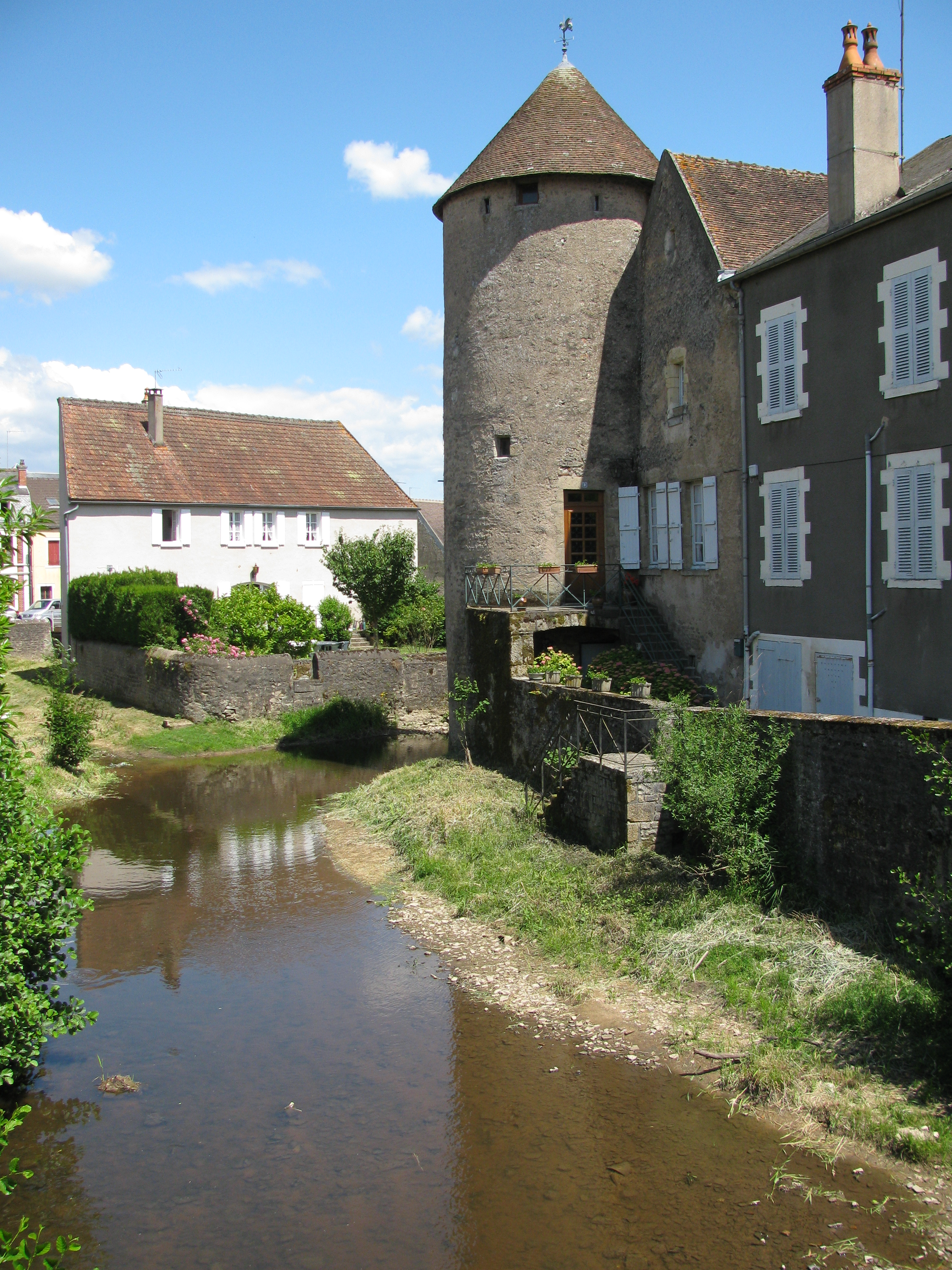
Ramparts

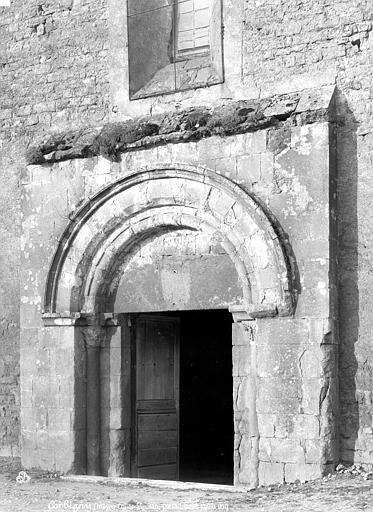
Former Eglise Saint-Jean (1891)

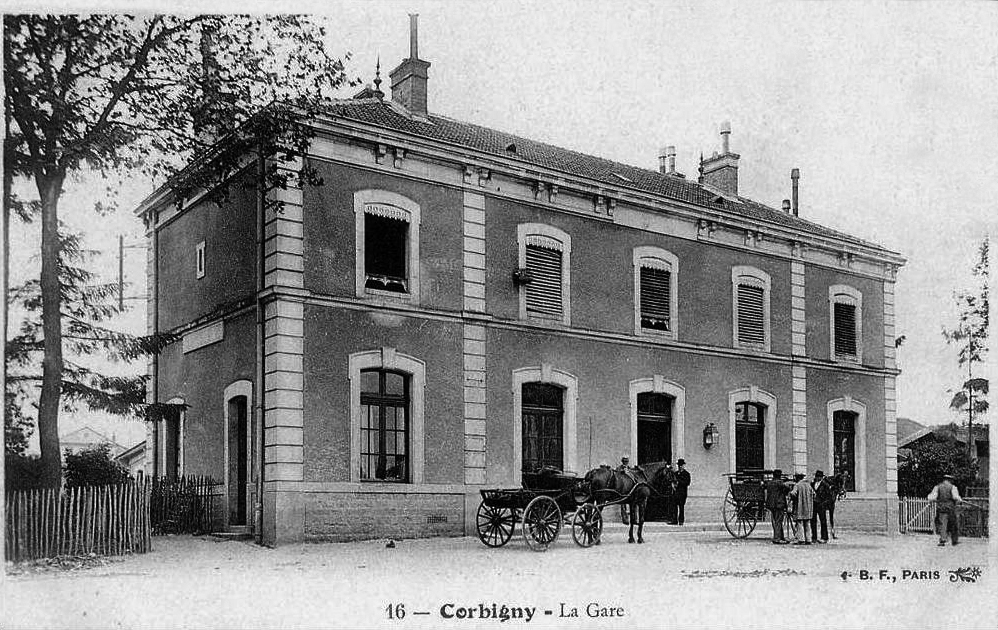
Train station (postcard, 1900)

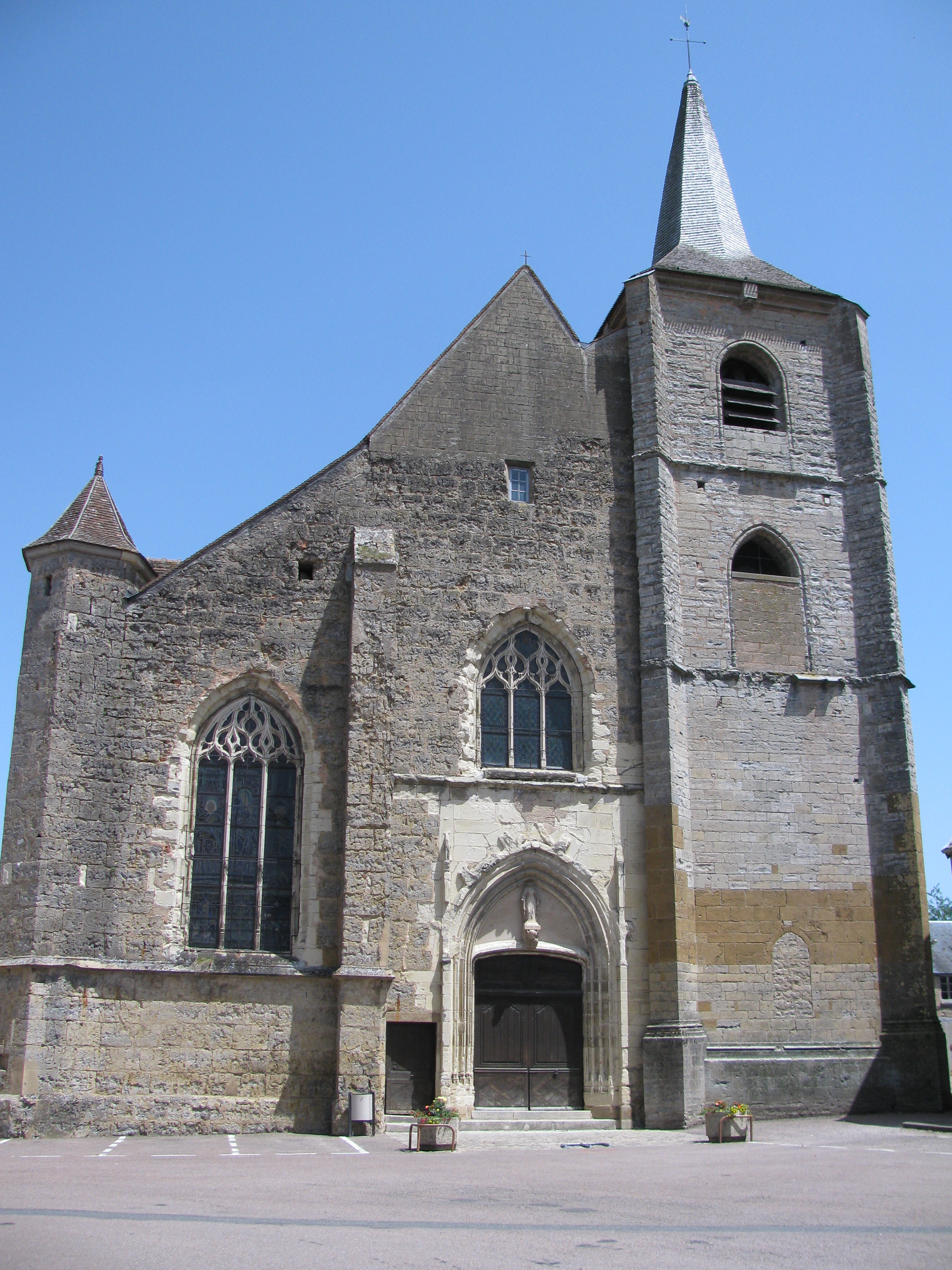
Church of Saint-Seine

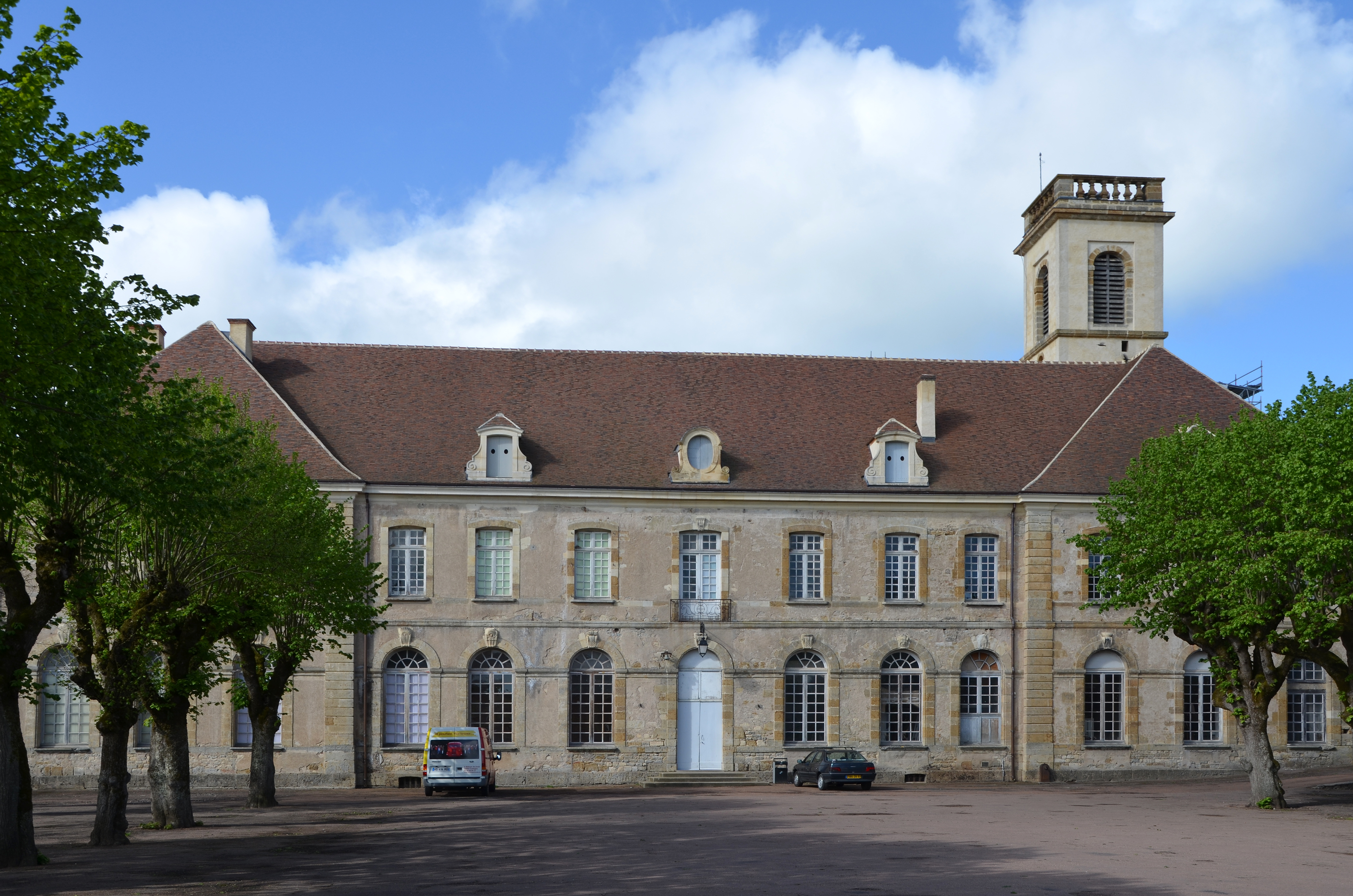
St. Leonard Abbey

== See also ==
- Communes of the Nièvre department
