= Maurice Noguès =

French aviator

Maurice Noguès (31 October 1889 – 15 January 1934) was a French aviator from Brittany.

== Biography ==
Noguès was born in Rennes, to Marthe Vallée and Émile Noguès; his father was a Colonel in the artillery. He taught himself to fly in 1909, and served in various French air squadrons during World War I, receiving command of Escadrille 73 in March 1918. During the war he received both the Croix de Guerre, multiple citations, and the Legion of Honour (the highest decoration in France). Toward the end of the war, 29 July 1918, Noguès married Magdalene Gicquel.

Dissatisfied with city life, in 1922 he joined the Franco-Romanian Air Transport Company (CFRNA, later CIDNA), flying primarily the Paris–Strasbourg route, but including flights as far east as Moscow. In 1924 he received the Medal of Encouragement to Progress (la médaille d'Encouragement au Progrès) and the vermeil medal from the Aéro-Club de France for establishing the Bucarest–Constantinople–Ankara air route. In 1926 he joined the Transair Courier Company (Compagnie des Messageries Transaériennes) (later part of Air Orient) initiating flights to Syria and then Lebanon. He was the chief pilot for Air Orient and in 1931 he extended the Syrian route to Saigon in then French Indochina.

When Air Orient merged to become Air France in 1933, Noguès became the executive vice president in charge of expanding the airline's routes. In December 1933 he took a prototype Dewoitine D.332, named Emeraude on a test-of-concept flight to Saigon. On the last leg of the return flight in January he encountered a snowstorm over central France and crashed into a hill near Corbigny. Noguès and all nine passengers were killed, including Pierre Pasquier, the Governor-General of French Indochina, and Emmanuel Chaumé, the French Director General of Civil Aviation. The probable cause of the crash was excessive icing. At the time he died, Noguès was actively working on both extending the Saigon–Hanoi route to Hong Kong and Canton, as well as the feasibility of a South Atlantic route to Brazil.

== Legacy ==
In 1938, Syria issued a postage stamp commemorating Noguès and the ten years of operations on the Paris-Damascus air route. That same year Lebanon issued a postage stamp picturing him and commemorating the tenth anniversary of the first Marseille-Beirut flight, which was made by Noguès.

In 1947 Air France named the Paris–Saigon air route after him (Ligne Noguès). A street in Voisins-le-Bretonneux is named after him.

In 1951, France issued a postage stamp commemorating Noguès and his vision of airplane routes around the world.

== Bibliography ==
- Bejui, Dominique (1993). Aviateurs d'Empire: L'épopée de l'aviation commerciale dans la France d'Outre-Mer (in French). Chanac, France: La Régordane. ISBN 978-2-906984-15-8.
- Boca, Robert (1949). Trois générations, deux guerres: Les Vallée, leurs enfants, leurs alliés (in French). Châtelaudren, France: Impr. de Châtelaudren. OCLC 493613295.
- Catillon, Marcel (2004). "Noguès Maurice, Émile". Mémorial aéronautique: Qui était qui?, Volume 2 (in French). Paris: Nouvelles Editions Latines. ISBN 978-2-7233-2053-5.
- Collot, Gérard & Cornu, Alain (1992). Ligne Noguès: Histoire aérophilatélique: Air Orient Air France, 1911-1941 (in French). Paris: B. Sinais.
- Kahn, Michèle (2007). La tragédie de l'Émeraude: enquête (in French). Monaco: Éditions du Rocher. ISBN 978-2-268-06316-4.
