= Jean-Michel Salanskis =

French mathematician

Jean-Michel Emmanuel Salanskis (born 5 April 1951 in Paris) is a French philosopher and mathematician, professor of science and philosophy at the University of Paris X Nanterre.

== Life ==
Originally gaining a Diplôme d'études approfondies in pure mathematics, he went on to study philosophy with Luis Puig and Jean-Francois Lyotard from 1974 to 1983. In 1986 he completed a doctoral dissertation on Le continu et le discret (the continuous and the discrete).

== Work ==
He is an important interpreter of continental philosophers such as Jacques Derrida, Emmanuel Levinas, Edmund Husserl, Martin Heidegger, and Gilles Deleuze, and he has published widely in English and French. He has also written about Judaism and the philosophy of mathematics.

In his book La gauche et l'égalité he argues that the left is structured by a “critique of power taking the form of a critique of man’s humiliation at the hands of transcendence" (p. 22), and that it is therefore necessary "to eliminate entirely the communist episode from the left,” for this episode partakes of the crushing of the people by one man who can “become the keystone of the world, restoring the attributes and the aura of royalty" (p. 37).

In his 2010 book Derrida, he presents the philosophy of Jacques Derrida in an accessible manner for the lay reader, showing how Derrida's work related to the fields of psychoanalysis, radical politics, and literature.

In Les temps du sens he embarks on a project to devise a mathematical hermeneutics that can be applied to fields such as philosophy of science, cognitive sciences and philosophy of religion.

== Bibliography ==
- 1991 - "L'herméneutique formelle" Éditions du CNRS.
- 1997 - "Heidegger" Belles Lettres.
- 1997 - "Le Temps du Sens" (English: The times of the senses). Hyx.
- 1998 - "Husserl". Belles Lettres.
- 1999 - "Le constructivisme non standard" Presses universitaires du Septentrion.
- 2000 - "Modèles et pensées de l'action"(Paris : L'harmattan).
- 2001 - "Sens et philosophie du sens"(Paris : Desclée de Brouwer).
- 2003 - 'Extermination, loi, Israël. Ethanalyse du fait juif" (English: Extermination, law, Israel: Eth-Analysis of the Jewish Fact) Paris, Les Belles Lettres.
- 2003 - "Herméneutique et cognition" Presses universitaires du Septentrion.
- 2004 - "Talmud, science et philosophie (English: Talmud, science and philosophy) Paris Les Belles Lettres.
- 2006 - "Lévinas vivant" (English: Lévinas alive) Paris, Les Belles Lettres.
- 2007 - "Territoires de sens" (English: Territories of the senses) Librairie Philosophique Vrin.
- 2008 - "Usages contemporains de la phénoménologie" (avec F.-D. Sebbah) Paris, Sens et Tonka.
- 2008 - "Philosophie des mathématiques" (English: Philosophy of Mathematics) Librairie Philosophique Vrin.
- 2009 - "Heidegger, le mal et la science. (English: Heidegger, Evil and Science) Paris, Klincksieck.
- 2009 - "Vivre avec les mathématiques" (English: Life with Mathematics) Seuil.
- 2009 - "La Gauche et L'égalité. (English: The Left and Equality) Presses Universitaires de France.
- 2010 - "Derrida". Belles Lettres.
- 2011 - "Le monde du computationnel" (English: the World of the Computational) Paris, Encre Marine.
- 2011 - "L'émotion éthique (Levinas vivant I)", Paris, Klincksieck.
- 2011 - "L'humanité de l'homme (Levinas vivant II)", Paris, Klincksieck.
- 2013 - "L'herméneutique formelle" (second edition), Paris, Klincksieck.
- 2014 - "Partages du sens", Nanterre, Presses Universitaires de Paris Nanterre.
- 2015 - "Le concret et l'idéal (Levinas vivant III)", Paris, Klincksieck.
- 2015 - "De la série à l'ethos", Nanterre, Presses Universitaires de Paris Nanterre.
- 2016 - "Crépuscule du théorique?" Paris, Encre Marine.
- 2016 - "Philosophie française et philosophie analytique au XXe siècle Presses Universitaires de France.
- 2016 - "L'humain impensé", (avec A. Piette) Nanterre, Presses Universitaires de Paris Nanterre.
- 2017 - "Le fait juif" (English: The Jewish Fact) Paris, Les Belles Lettres.
- 2019 - "La voie idéale Paris, Presses Universitaires de France.
- 2020 - "Itinerarium Jeana François Lyotarda. Wprowadzenie do filizofii XX wieku, Warsaw, Semper.
- 2020 - "Versions du politique", Nanterre, Presses Universitaires de Paris Nanterre.

=== Articles in English ===
- 1994 - "Continuity, cognition, linguistics", in The Continuum in Semantical Linguistics, C. Fuchs and B. Victorri (Ed.), Amsterdam/Philadelphia, J. Benjamins, 127-153.
- 1995 - "Die Wissenschaft denkt nicht", in Tekhnema n° 2, trad. G. Collins, Paris, 60-84.
- 1996 - "Idea and Destination" in Deleuze : A Critical Reader, P. Patton ed., Oxford-Cambridge, Blackwell, 1996, 57-80.
- 1997 - "Analysis, Hermeneutics, Mathematics", in Otte, M., & Panza, M. (eds), Analysis and Synthesis in Mathematics, Kluwer Academic Publishers, 227-241.
- 2000- "Sense and Continuum in Husserl", in Petitot, J., Varela, F.J., Pachoud, B., & Roy, J.-M., Naturalizing Phenomenology, Standford, Stanford University Press, 490-507.
- 2002 - "Some Figures of Matter", in What is Materialism ?, Plì The Warwick Journal of Philosophy, Brassier, R. & Toscano, A. eds, vol. 12, Warwick, 2001, 5-13.
- 2006- "Mathematics, Metaphysics, Philosophy", in Duffy, S., (ed.)Virtual Mathematics, Manchester, Clinamen Press, 46-64.
- 2010- "The Early Levinas and Heidegger", in Levinas Studies, vol. 5, Pittsburgh, Duquenne University Press, pp. 43–64.
- 2012- "Honneth, Lyotard, Levinas", in Recognition theory and contemporary French moral and political philosophy, Manchester, Manchester University Press, pp. 191–207.
- 2014- "Some notions of action", in Science After the Practice Turn in Philosophy, History and the Social Studies of Science, Routledge, pp. 44–57.
- 2015- "Freedom of Framework", in Science as it Could Have Been, L. Soler, E. Trizio and A. Pickering (ed.), Pittsburgh, University of Pittsburgh Press, pp. 240–261.
- 2019- "Violence, a Slippery Notion", in Murawska, M. and Sosnowska, P. (eds), Eidos A Journal for Philosophy of Culture, Volume 3: No. 2 (8)/2019, Labyrinths of Violence, pp. 5–12.
- 2021- "Truth, Practice and Philosophy of Culture", in Eidos A Journal for Philosophy of Culture, vol.4 n°4, pp. 7–16.
