= Jean-Côme Noguès =

French children's writer

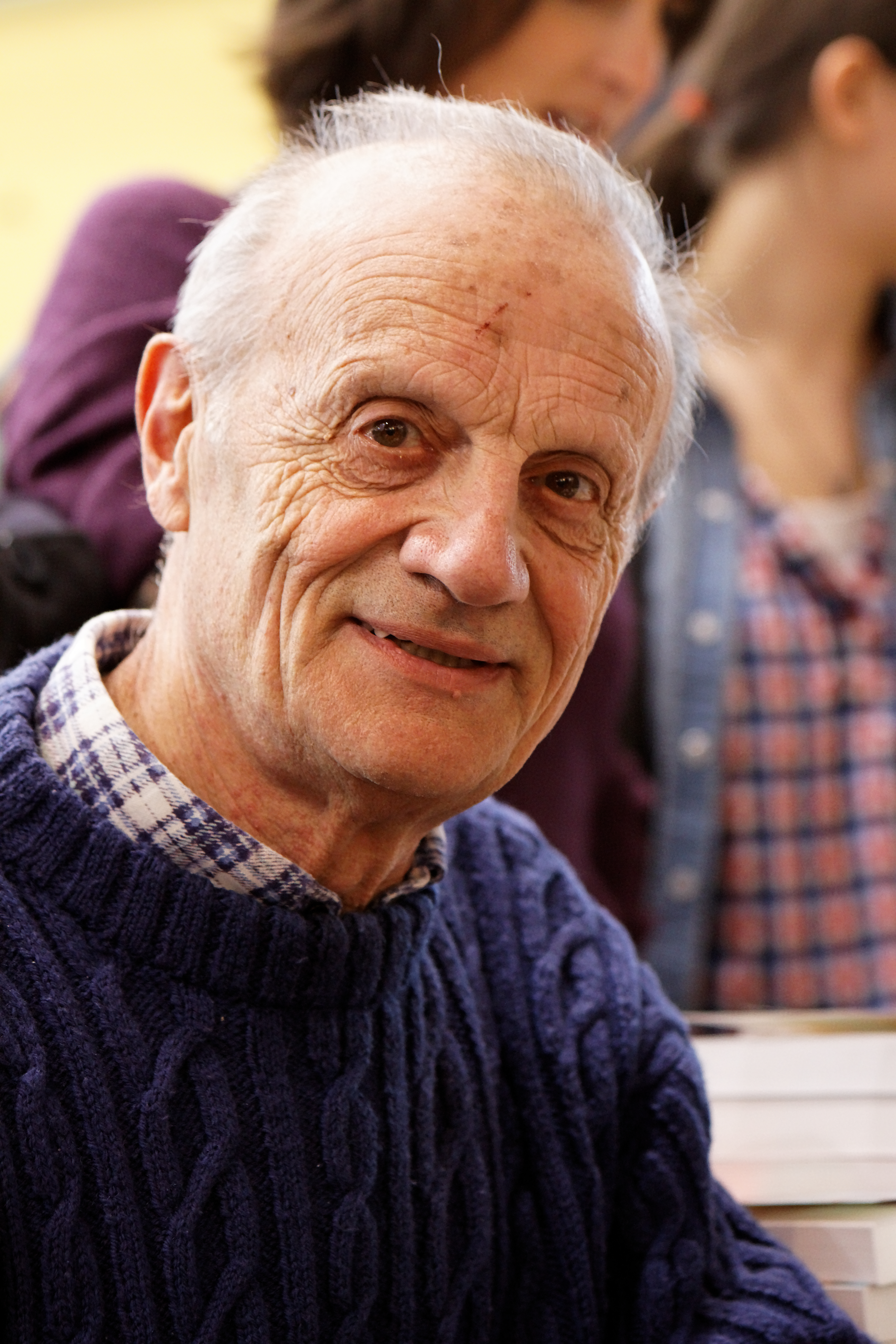
- Born: 28 February 1934 (age 92); Castelnaudary, Aude, France
- Occupation: Children's author

Jean-Côme Noguès (born 28 February 1934) is a French children's author from Castelnaudary
