= Jû-Belloc =

- Commune
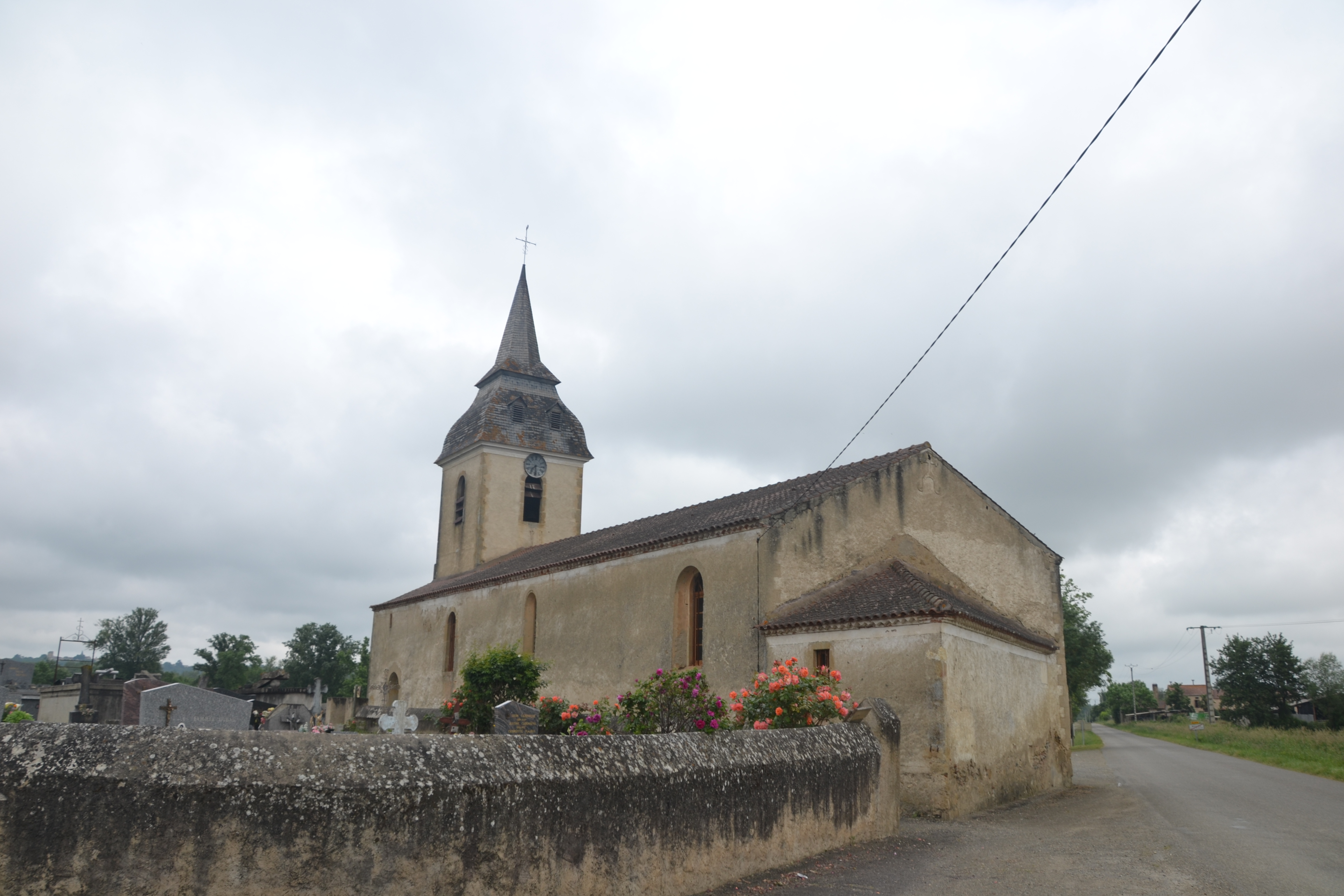
- The church in Belloc
- Location of Jû-Belloc
- Location within France Location within Occitanie
- Coordinates: 43°35′01″N 0°00′21″E
- Country: France
- Region: Occitania
- Department: Gers
- Arrondissement: Mirande
- Canton: Pardiac-Rivière-Basse
- Intercommunality: Bastides et vallons du Gers

Government
  - Mayor (2020–2026): Alain Paysse
- Area^{1}: 10.01 km^{2} (3.86 sq mi)
- Elevation: 139 m (456 ft)
- Highest elevation: 202 m (663 ft)
- Lowest elevation: 131 m (430 ft)
- Population (2023): 286
  - Density: 28.6/km^{2} (74.0/sq mi)
- Time zone: UTC+01:00 (CET)
  - Summer (DST): UTC+02:00 (CEST)
- INSEE/Postal code: 32163 /32160
- ^{1} French Land Register data, which excludes lakes, ponds, glaciers > 1 km^{2} (0.386 sq mi or 247 acres) and river estuaries.

Jû-Belloc (French pronunciation: [ʒy belɔk]; Occitan: Ju e Bethlòc) is a commune in the Gers department in southwestern France.

== Geography ==
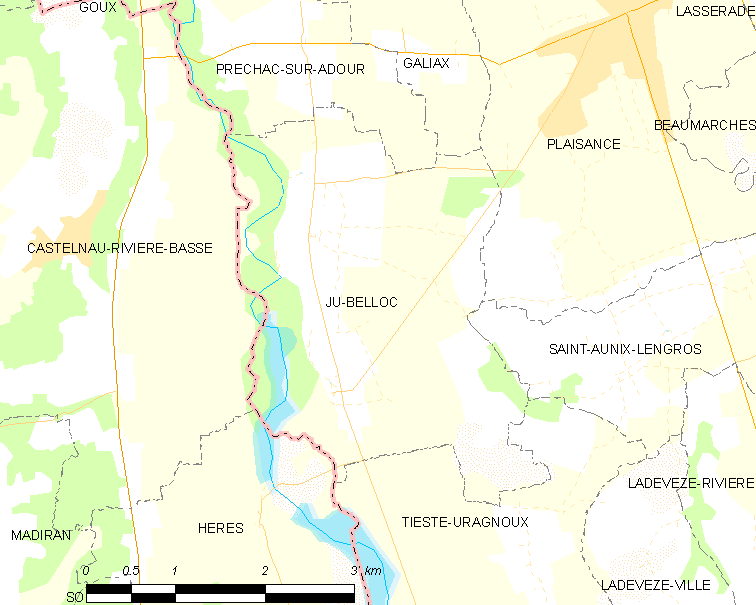
Jû-Belloc and its surrounding communes

== Population ==
Historical population
Year	Pop.	±% p.a.
1968	336	—
1975	300	−1.61%
1982	303	+0.14%
1990	263	−1.75%
1999	305	+1.66%
2007	314	+0.36%
2012	319	+0.32%
2017	296	−1.49%
2023	286	−0.57%
Source: INSEE

== See also ==
- Communes of the Gers department
