= SubStance =

- Discipline: Culture, literature
- Language: English
- Edited by: Sydney Lévy; Michel Pierssens

Publication details
- History: 1971-present
- Publisher: Johns Hopkins University Press (United States)
- Frequency: Triannually

Standard abbreviations
- ISO 4: SubStance

Indexing
- ISSN: 0049-2426 (print); 1527-2095 (web)
- JSTOR: 00492426
- OCLC no.: 643569666

Links
- Journal homepage; Online access at Project MUSE; Journal page at publisher's website

SubStance: A Review of Theory and Literary Criticism is a triannual peer-reviewed academic journal that was established in 1971 and is published by the Johns Hopkins University Press. It covers work on literature and culture, with an emphasis on French literature. The editors-in-chief are Sydney Lévy (University of California, Santa Barbara) and Michel Pierssens (Université de Montréal).

== Abstracting and indexing ==
The journal is abstracted and indexed in:

- Arts and Humanities Citation Index
- Current Contents/Arts and Humanities
- MLA International Bibliography
- Scopus
