= Plaisance, Gers =

Plaisance (Plasença)
- Commune
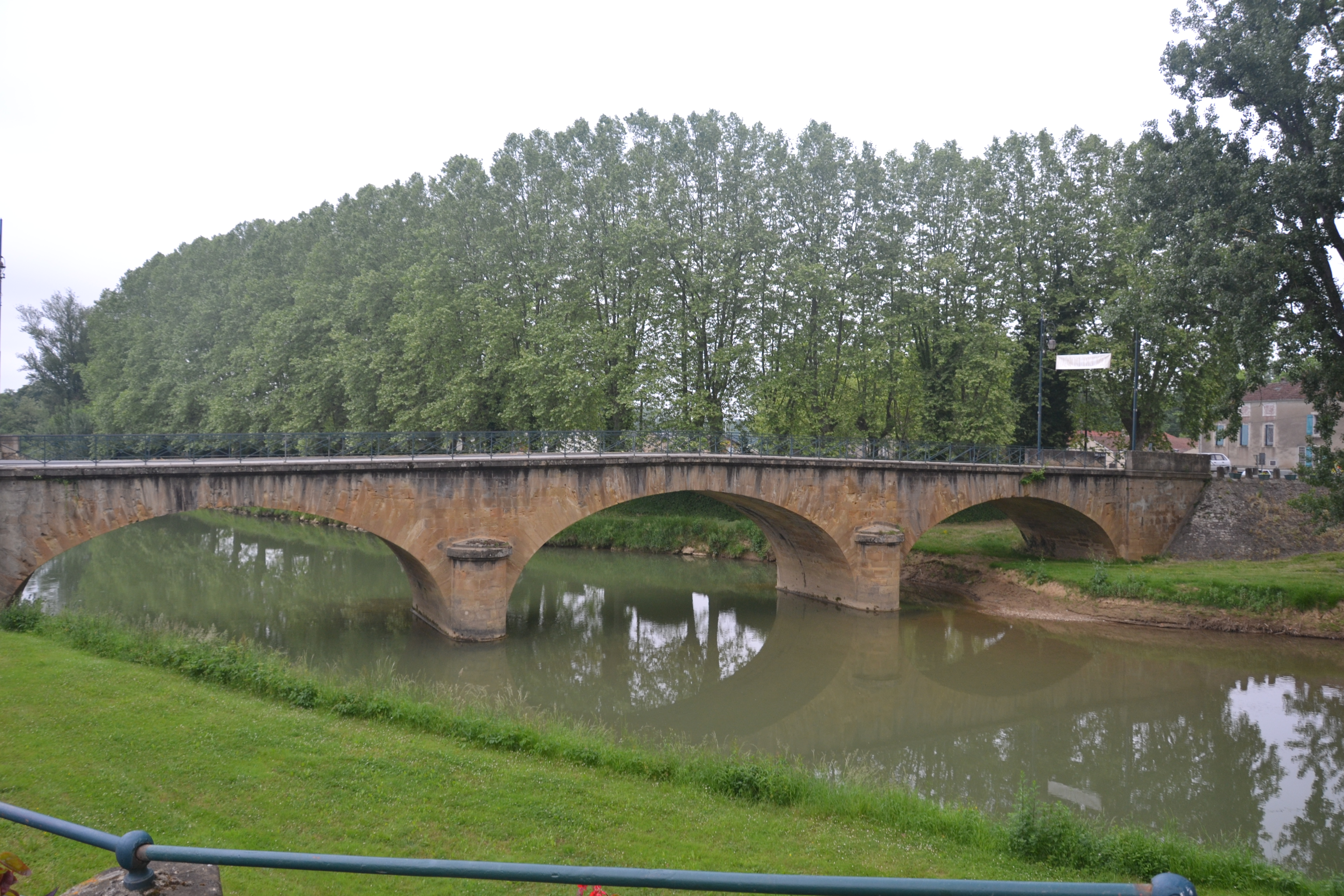
- The bridge on the river Arros

- Coat of arms
- Location of Plaisance (Plasença)
- Location within France Location within Occitanie
- Coordinates: 43°36′24″N 0°02′50″E
- Country: France
- Region: Occitania
- Department: Gers
- Arrondissement: Mirande
- Canton: Pardiac-Rivière-Basse
- Intercommunality: Bastides et vallons du Gers

Government
  - Mayor (2020–2026): Patrick Fitan
- Area^{1}: 13.71 km^{2} (5.29 sq mi)
- Elevation: 131 m (430 ft)
- Highest elevation: 186 m (610 ft)
- Lowest elevation: 122 m (400 ft)
- Population (2023): 1,430
  - Density: 104/km^{2} (270/sq mi)
- Time zone: UTC+01:00 (CET)
  - Summer (DST): UTC+02:00 (CEST)
- INSEE/Postal code: 32319 /32160
- ^{1} French Land Register data, which excludes lakes, ponds, glaciers > 1 km^{2} (0.386 sq mi or 247 acres) and river estuaries.

Plaisance (French pronunciation: [plɛzɑ̃s]; Gascon: Plasença) is a commune in the Gers department in southwestern France.

== Geography ==
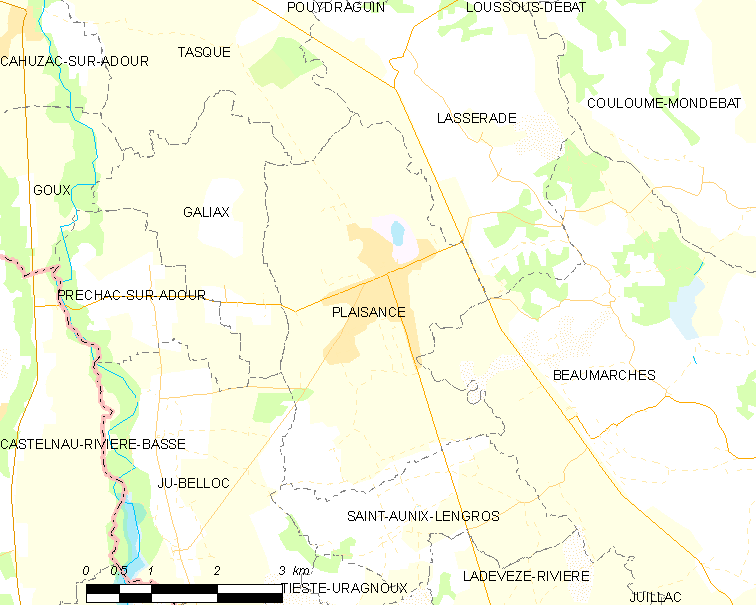
Plaisance and its surrounding communes

== Population ==
Historical population
Year	Pop.	±% p.a.
1968	1,535	—
1975	1,576	+0.38%
1982	1,575	−0.01%
1990	1,657	+0.64%
1999	1,479	−1.25%
2007	1,465	−0.12%
2012	1,475	+0.14%
2017	1,461	−0.19%
2023	1,430	−0.36%
Source: INSEE

== See also ==
- Communes of the Gers department
