= Castelnau-Rivière-Basse =

Castelnau Rivière-Basse
- Commune
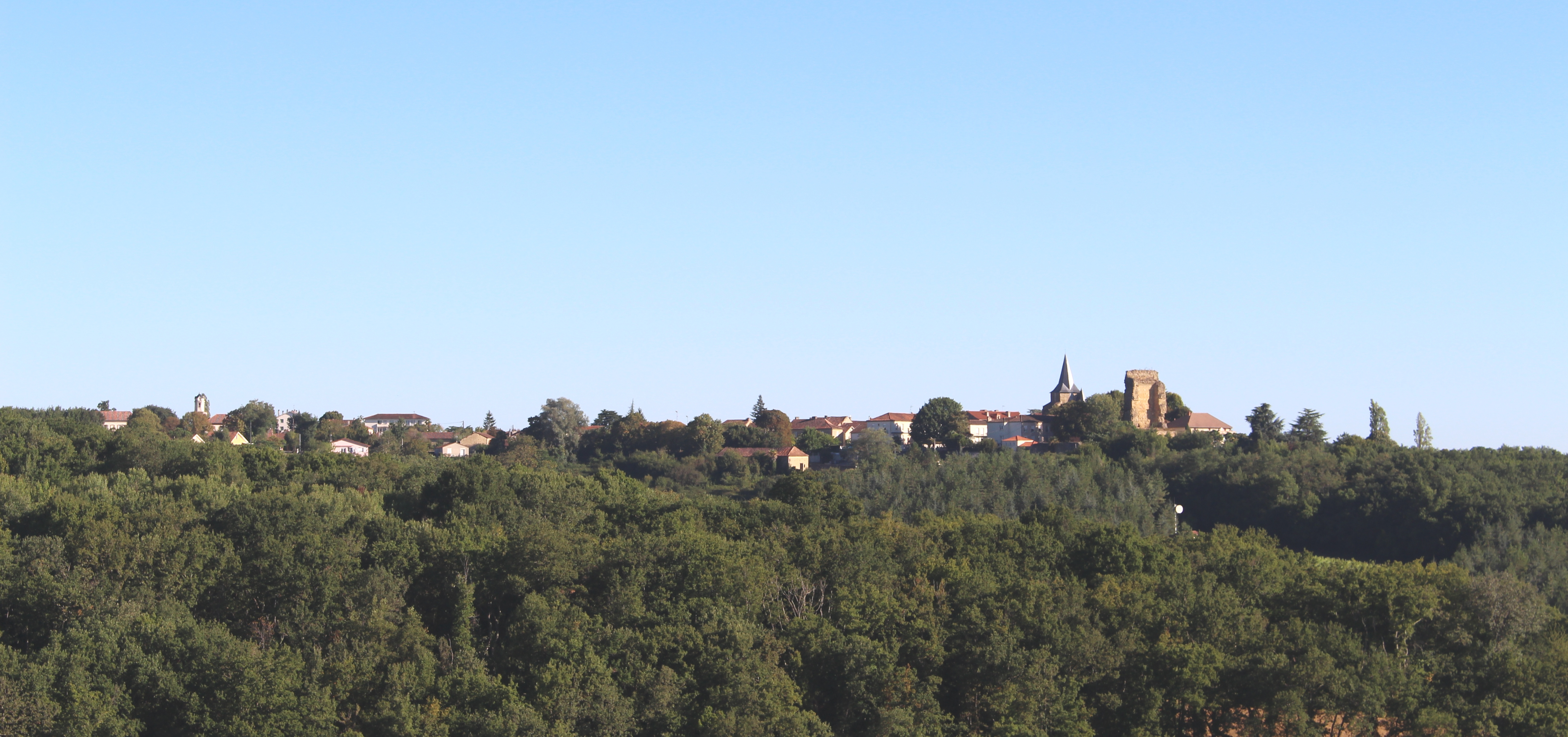
- View of Castelnau-Rivière-Basse

- Coat of arms
- Location of Castelnau Rivière-Basse
- Location within France Location within Occitanie
- Coordinates: 43°34′54″N 0°01′40″W
- Country: France
- Region: Occitania
- Department: Hautes-Pyrénées
- Arrondissement: Tarbes
- Canton: Val d'Adour-Rustan-Madiranais

Government
  - Mayor (2020–2026): Sandra Ducès
- Area^{1}: 18.5 km^{2} (7.1 sq mi)
- Elevation: 240 m (790 ft)
- Highest elevation: 249 m (817 ft)
- Lowest elevation: 128 m (420 ft)
- Population (2023): 649
  - Density: 35.1/km^{2} (90.9/sq mi)
- Time zone: UTC+01:00 (CET)
  - Summer (DST): UTC+02:00 (CEST)
- INSEE/Postal code: 65130 /65700
- ^{1} French Land Register data, which excludes lakes, ponds, glaciers > 1 km^{2} (0.386 sq mi or 247 acres) and river estuaries.

Castelnau-Rivière-Basse is a commune in the Hautes-Pyrénées department in south-western France. The commune shares its name with the village that lies within its boundaries.

The actual village of Castelnau-Rivière-Basse stands on top of a hill above the main D935 road, although drivers on that road pass signs incorrectly indicating that they are entering and leaving the village. In late 2010 a local resident installed an improvised sign, hanging below the official 'leaving Castelnau-Riviere-Basse' road sign on the southbound direction on the D935, advising that the right turn up to the village itself is 800 metres distant. This has now been removed.

The wider commune encompasses the village, land mainly devoted to agricultural activity, and a small lake. On the main D935 route there is a small but well used truck stop comprising a 'Routier' style restaurant.

The Occitan Gascon translation of Castelnau-Rivière-Basse is Castèthnau de Ribèra Baisha.

== See also ==
- Communes of the Hautes-Pyrénées department
