= André de Maricourt =

French historian

André du Mesnil de Maricourt
- Born: 4 December 1874; Senlis, Oise, France
- Died: 16 November 1945 (aged 70)
- Education: École Nationale des Chartes
- Occupation: historian
- Parent: René de Maricourt

Baron André de Maricourt (French pronunciation: [ɑ̃dʁe də maʁikuʁ]; 4 December 1874 – 16 November 1945) was a French historian.

== Early life ==
André de Maricourt was born on 4 December 1874 in Senlis, Oise near Paris. He graduated from the École Nationale des Chartes in 1900.

== Career ==
Maricourt wrote articles about the Armée des Émigrés, King Louis XVI, the jails in Paris during the Reign of Terror, the Duchess of Berry, and Cardinal Richelieu. They were published in the Revue de Paris, the Revue d'histoire moderne et contemporaine, the Revue des questions historiques, Le Correspondant, etc.

Maricourt authored several biographies, including one of Marshal Ferdinand Foch. He also wrote several books about World War I. Maricourt won several prizes for his books from the Académie française: the Prix Auguste Furtado for Madame de Souza et sa famille in 1908; the Prix Marcelin Guérin for Louise-Marie-Adélaïde de Bourbon-Penthièvre, duchesse d’Orléans in 1917; the Prix Montyon for Idylle et drame. Georgine de Chastellaux et Charles de la Bédoyère in 1925; and the Prix d’Académie for La véritable madame Tallien in 1934.

Maricourt was the president of the History and Archeology Society of Senlis in 1927.

== Death ==
Maricourt died on 16 November 1945.

== Works ==
- Souvenirs du Baron Hüe, officier de la Chambre du roi Louis XVI et du roi Louis XVIII (1787-1815), Calmann Lévy éditeurs, Paris, 1901
- Essai sur l'histoire du duché de Nemours de 1404 à 1606, dans Annales de la Société historique & archéologique du Gâtinais
- Du protestantisme au catholicisme. Psychologie d'une conversion au XVIIe siècle - Mme Chardon, Librairie Bloud et Cie, Paris, 1904
- Madame de Souza et sa famille. Les Marigny - Les Flahaut. Auguste de Morny (1761-1836), Émile-Paul éditeur, Paris, 1907
- Louise-Marie-Adélaïde de Bourbon Penthièvre, duchesse d'Orléans. La jeunesse. Le duc de Penthièvre - Le Palais-Royal - La séparation (1753-1791), Émile-Paul frères éditeurs, Paris, 1913
- Le drame de Senlis. Journal d'un témoin. Avant, pendant, après, août-décembre 1914, Bloud et Gay éditeurs, Paris, 1916
- En flanant sans Senlis, 1930
- Mort du duc d'Enghien, Éditions des Portiques, Paris, 1931
- Ce bon abbé Prévost, 1933
- La véritable Madame Tallien, Éditions des Portiques, Paris, 1933
- avec Maurice de Bertrandfosse, Les Bourbons (1518-1830). hérédité - pathologie - amours et grandeur, Émile-Paul frères, Paris, 1936
- Les Valois (1293-1589). Hérédités, pathologie, amours et grandeur, Émile-Paul frères, Paris, 1939
- L'art de souffrir, Éditions Spes, Paris, 1936
- L'art de se conduire, Éditions Spes, Paris, 1939
- Famille et généalogie, Lethielleux, Paris, 1942
