= Dewoitine D.430 =

French three engined aircraft

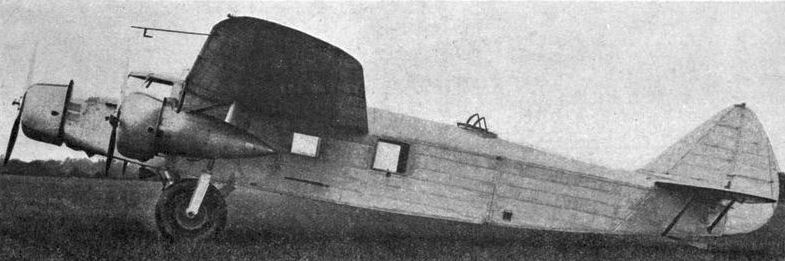

General information
- Type: Colonial policing
- National origin: France
- Manufacturer: Constructions Aéronautiques Émile Dewoitine
- Number built: 1

History
- First flight: 2 October 1932

The Dewoitine D.430 was a three-engine, high-wing monoplane designed for policing and other roles in France's colonies. It did not go into production.

== Design ==
In 1930 the Direction Générale Technique issued a programme for an aircraft to operate in the French Colonies. It was to have three Lorraine 9N Algol engines, an all-metal structure and to be capable of reconnaissance, observation, policing and bombing as well as medical evacuations or general transport. The Dewoitine D.430 was one of nine prototypes built for this programme.

It was an all-metal aircraft constructed and skinned largely from duralumin. Its five-part high wing was straight-tapered to elliptical tips and had an aspect ratio of over 9, high for the time. It had a single spar at one third chord which tapered uniformly in depth outwards along the span and was reinforced with duralumin trellising. The leading edge formed a subsidiary box spar, and the trailing edge had dural tube ribs and formed a false spar for high-aspect-ratio ailerons, which occupied about half the span.

The D.430's outer 300 hp (224 kW) nine-cylinder Algol radial engines had long-chord NACA cowlings, and were mounted on bearings enclosed in long, streamlined nacelles; these were supported under the wings by four steel struts to the leading edge box spar and to the main spar. The central engine, under a similar cowling, was in the nose of the fuselage.

The three-part fuselage was flat-sided and tapered only slightly towards the tail, proving a large interior which could be adapted to a variety of tasks. The pilots sat side by side in an enclosed cockpit ahead of the leading edge, equipped with dual control. Behind, the cabin was 5.10 m (16 ft 9 in) long, 1.48 m (4 ft 10 in) wide and 1.80 m (5 ft 11 in) high. It could accommodate observation, reconnaissance or bombing equipment or hold two wounded on couches or four passengers. At the rear of the cabin there was a position for a dorsal machine gun on a flexible mounting. Access was through a port-side door under the wing; three square windows on each side lit the cabin.

The D.430's tail was conventional, with a blunted triangular fin and a deep, round-edged unbalanced rudder. Its tapered tailplane was mounted on top of the fuselage, braced by two struts on each side to the lower fuselage, and carried narrow, full-span elevators.

It had a fixed undercarriage with its main wheels on V-struts hinged from the lower fuselage and on vertical shock absorbing oleo struts to the engine mountings. The wheels were under large fairings; under the tail the D.430 had a long, leaf spring tail-skid.

== Operational history ==
The D.430 was first flown on 2 October 1932 and by mid-December it was being officially tested at Villacoublay. The Colonial tri-motor contract was awarded to the Bloch MB.120, so no more D.430s were built. The prototype was initially registered as F-AKFN in the F-AK.. section reserved for French military prototypes but in September 1933 it was re-registered onto the commercial list, owned by the state, as F-AMRU. It remained in use for several years; in 1934 it showed the flag in Belgium and took the Minister of Aviation to the French aerobatic contest in Algeria.

A change of type to D.432 was recorded when its Algol engines were replaced with Hispano-Suiza 9Ts, (licence-built Clerget 9C diesel radial engines), in 1937. It was destroyed in a non-fatal crash on 2 June 1938 when both the wing engines failed together.

== Variants ==
D.430
As described. One only, F-AKFN then F-AMRU.
D.432
D.430 F-AMRU re-engined with Hispano-Suiza 9T radials in 1937.

== Specifications ==
Data from Les Ailes November 1933

General characteristics

- Crew: Three
- Length: 15.38 m (50 ft 6 in)
- Wingspan: 25.05 m (82 ft 2 in)
- Height: 3.5 m (11 ft 6 in)
- Wing area: 67 m^{2} (720 sq ft)
- Empty weight: 3,344 kg (7,372 lb)
- Gross weight: 5,030 kg (11,089 lb)
- Powerplant: 3 × Lorraine 9Na Algol 9-cylinder radial, 220 kW (300 hp) each
- Propellers: 3-bladed on outer engines, 2 on inner

Performance

- Maximum speed: 262 km/h (163 mph, 141 kn) at ground level
- Cruise speed: 230 km/h (140 mph, 120 kn) at ground level
- Minimum control speed: 107 km/h (66 mph, 58 kn) at ground level
- Range: 1,055 km (656 mi, 570 nmi) into 50 km/h (31 mph) head-wind
- Service ceiling: 7,000 m (23,000 ft) theoretical
- Time to altitude: 26 min 36 sec to 5,000 m (16,000 ft)
- Landing and take-off runs: 220 m (720 ft)
