= D28 =

D28 may refer to:

== Ships ==
- Brazilian destroyer Paraíba (1959), a Pará-class destroyer of the Brazilian Navy
- Brazilian destroyer Paraíba (1989), a Garcia-class destroyer of the Brazilian Navy
- HMS Vanity (D28), a V-class destroyer of the Royal Navy
- Greek destroyer Thyella (D28), a Fletcher-class destroyer of the Hellenic Navy

== Other uses ==
- D28 road (Croatia)
- Dewoitine D.28, a French aircraft
- Martin D-28, a guitar model
- Sonatensatz, D 28 (Schubert), a piano work by Franz Schubert
- Iceberg D-28, which calved from the Amery Ice Shelf in Antarctica in September 2019
- LNER Class D28, a class of British steam locomotives
