= HACR =

HACR can refer to:

- Heating Air-Conditioning & Refrigeration
- Hidro Antonio Cañete de Reconocimiento, a Spanish flying boat also known as Cañete Pirata
- Hispanic association on corporate responsibility, a nonprofit coalition of Hispanic organizations
