= Dewoitine D.1 =

D.1
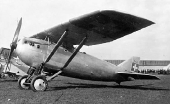

General information
- Type: Fighter
- Manufacturer: Dewoitine
- Designer: Emile Dewoitine
- Number built: ca 500 of all marks

History
- First flight: 18 November 1922
- Variants: D.9, D.19 D.21, D.25, D.26 and D.27

The Dewoitine D.1 was a French single-seat fighter aircraft of the 1920s, built by the French industrial company Dewoitine.

== Development ==
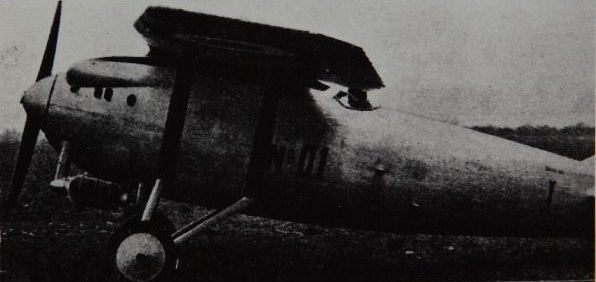
Prototype D.1 with short pylon

The D.1 was the first airplane designed by Emile Dewoitine after he established his own company. The D.1 was designed to meet requirements issued by the French Service Technique de l'Aeronautique. It was a monoplane, with a metal oval-section fuselage with duralumin sheet skinning, and a metal strut-braced parasol wing with fabric covering. The first prototype (D.1.01) flew in November 1922.

Derivatives of the D.1 were fitted with V-8 (D.1 and D.8), V-12 (D.19 and D.27), W-12 (D.12 and D.21) and radial engines (D.9 and D.26) as well as a variety of wing designs. Radiators on the inline engine versions were mounted on the undercarriage struts (D.1 and D.8), on the sides of the engine cowling (D.1.01), ahead of the cowling on the nose (D.12, D.19 D.21), or under the nose (D.27 and D.53).

== Operational history ==
The D.1 was demonstrated in several countries. Yugoslavia purchased 79, Switzerland two, and Japan one. Italy purchased one, but then constructed 112 of their own version under the designation Ansaldo AC.2.

The French Air Force did not put the D.1 into service, but the French Navy acquired 30 D.1ter's, 15 of which equipped Escadrille 7C1 and operated off the French aircraft carrier Béarn.

== Surviving aircraft ==
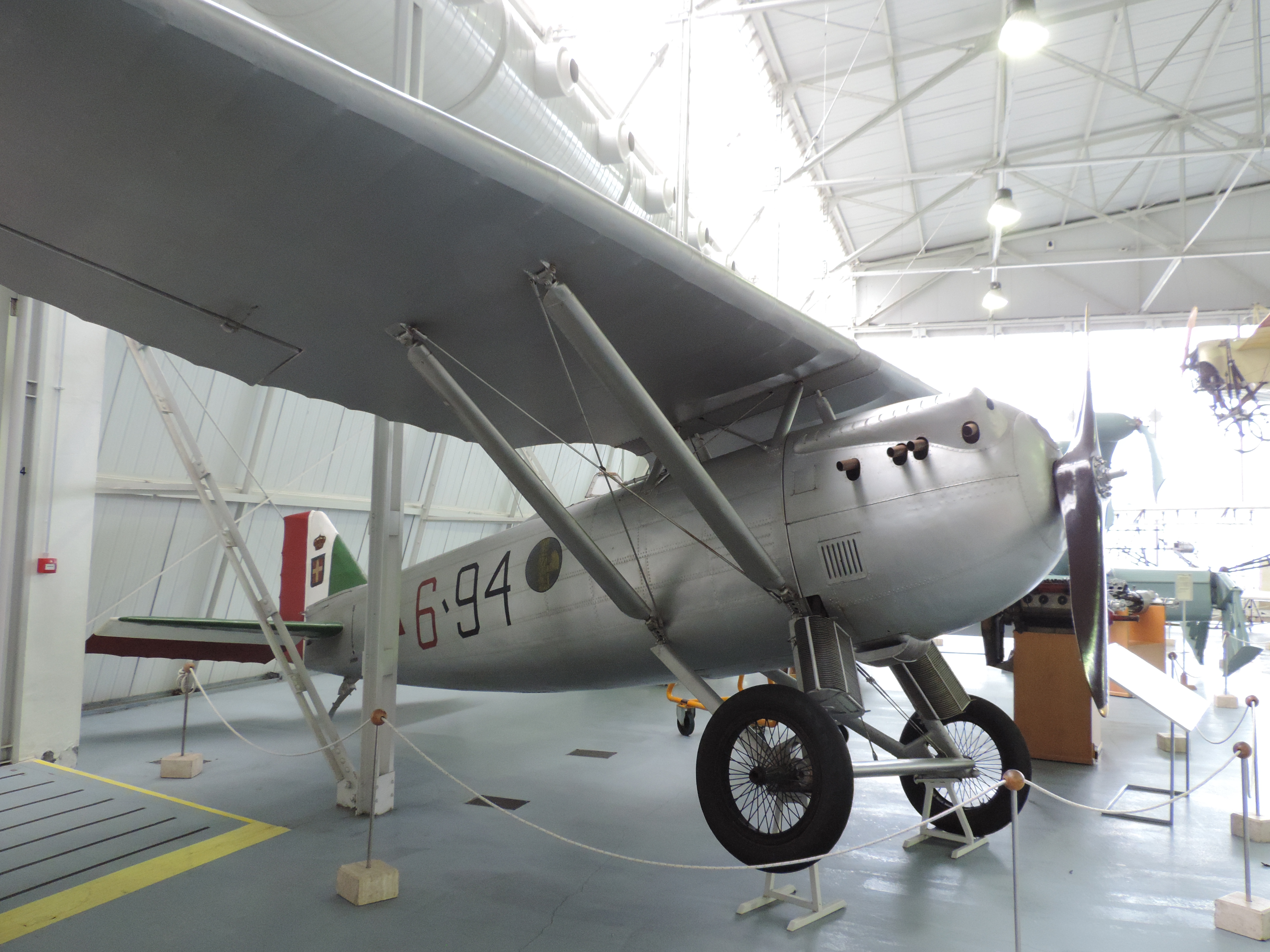
Ansaldo AC.2 at the Italian Air Force Museum

- Ansaldo AC.2 MM1208 is on display at the Italian Air Force Museum at Vigna di Valle in central Italy.

== Variants ==
D.1.01
the first prototype powered with a 224 kW (300 hp) Hispano-Suiza 8Fb V-8, and fitted with a parasol wing on a very short pylon with no cabane struts; (one built).

D.1
Pre-series aircraft, some without pylon and some with pylon to D.1bis standard; (15 built).

D.1bis
Improved version with wings raised 121 mm (4.75 in) on a pylon.

D.1ter
Production standard D.1 with the wings supported on cabane struts. Most D.1s were built or modified to D.1ter standard.

D.8
A high-altitude D.1 with an enlarged wood wing and a high compression 270 kW (360 hp) Hispano-Suiza 8Fe V-8 engine. Submitted to the CEDANA (Commission dÉxamen des Appareils Nouveaux pour lÁeronautique) for the 1921 C1 fighter competition, the D.8 failed to attract an order due to the high altitude class specification being withdrawn. The sole D.8 set a number of closed circuit speed records in 1924; (one built).

D.9

The D.9 was a D.1 fitted with a 310 kW (420 hp) Gnome-Rhône 9Ab Jupiter IV radial engine and later an enlarged wing. It was entered into the 1924 C1 fighter competition. Although unsuccessful in France, ten were delivered to export customers including eight to Yugoslavia, two to Belgium, while three were built for the Swiss Fliegertruppe by EKW, and 150 were built with additional modifications as the Ansaldo AC.3 for Italy; (thirteen built).

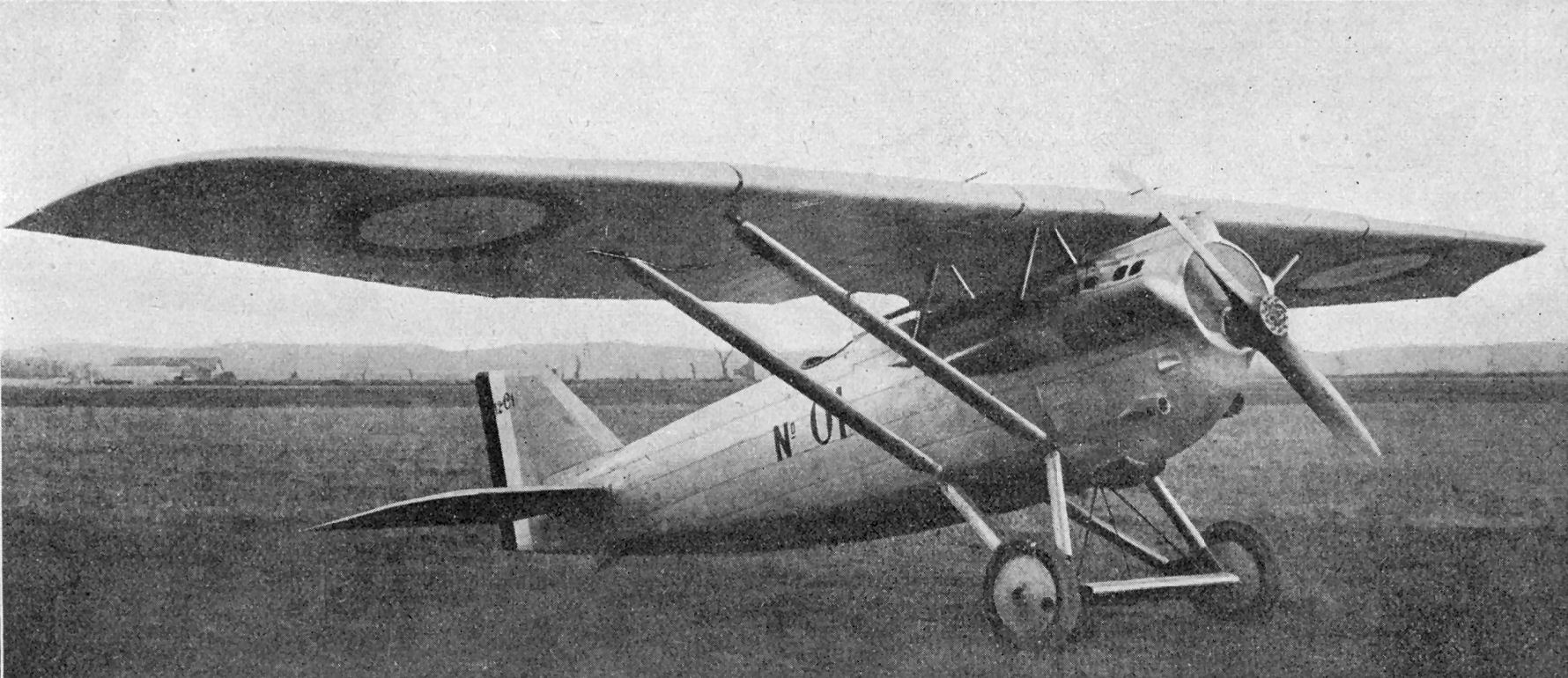
Dewoitine D.12 C.1 photo from L'Aéronautique January,1926

D.12
The D.12 was developed in parallel to the D.9 with a 340 kW (450 hp) Lorraine-Dietrich 12E W-12 for the 1923 C1 competition. Later fitted with a high compression engine the D.12 also failed to win a contract; (two built).

D.13
1923 proposal for D.1 re-engined with 260 kW (350 hp) Hispano-Suiza 12Ja engine. Project abandoned in favour of D.19.

D.19

The D.19 was also built for the 1923 C1 fighter competition, and was fitted with a 300 kW (400 hp) Hispano-Suiza 12Jb V-12 engine. Two prototypes took part in the competition and two were delivered to Belgium, and one to Switzerland, while EKW built two more in Switzerland; (seven built).

D.21

Late in 1925 the second prototype D.12 was re-engined with a 370 kW (500 hp) Hispano-Suiza 12Gb W-12 engine. Intended for export the D.21 acquired orders for 3 from Paraguay, 12 from Turkey, and 8 from Argentina (including a prototype), where 30 were also built under licence by FMA, and 7 were imported from Switzerland where they had been built by EKW. The examples built by FMA had Lorraine-Dietrich 12Eb W-12 engines, making them D.12s, but the D.21 designation was always used. Three examples may have been sold to Czechoslovakia, where 26 were built under licence by Škoda Works as the Skoda D.1. (100 built).

D.25

Two seat fighter derived from D.21 for the French 1925 C2 (2 seat Chasseur or fighter) programme, but fitted with a Lorraine-Dietrich 12Eb W-12 engine. The four built by Hanriot were sold to Argentina after failing to win orders from the French. (4 built)

D.26

Trainer version powered with a licence built 250 kW (340 hp) Hispano-Wright 9Q 9-cylinder radial engine. Eleven examples assembled in Switzerland from kits supplied by Dewoitine. (11 built)

D.27

Fighter version powered by a 373 kW (500 hp) Hispano-Suiza 12Mc V-12 with improved chin radiator. The Royal Romanian Air Force operated 100, of which 97 were built by IAR, the Swiss Air Force operated 66, of which 65 were built by EKW, the Royal Yugoslav Air Force operated 4, all built by Zmaj, and 2 or 3 were exported to Spain. 7 of a further improved variant, the D.53 were used by the French Aviation Navale for deck trials. (179+ built)

Ansaldo AC.1
Sole D.1bis assembled by Aeronautica Ansaldo SA prior to production of the modified AC.2 version;(1 built).

Ansaldo AC.2
Modified D.1ter built under licence by Ansaldo in Italy for the Regia Aeronautica;(112 built).

Ansaldo AC.3

Licence production of a D.9 derivative for the Regia Aeronautica; (150 built).

Ansaldo AC.4
A re-engined version of the AC.2, the AC.4 replaced the Hispano-Suiza V-8 engine with a 310 kW (420 hp) FIAT A.20 V-12 engine. Flown in 1927;(14 AC.2 converted in AC.4).

Skoda D.1
D.21 built in Czechoslovakia by Škoda Works; (26 built)

== Operators ==
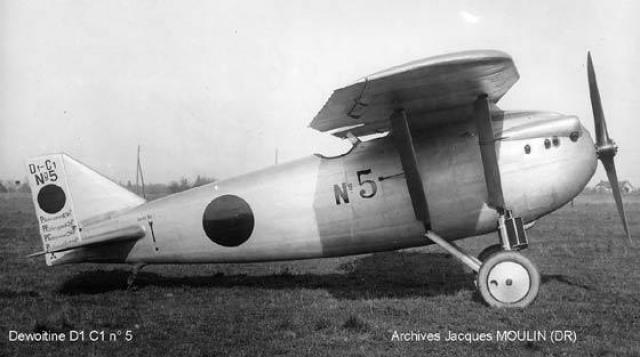
Dewoitine D.1bis demonstrator, sold to Japan

Czechoslovakia

- One D.1bis aircraft.

France

- French Navy
  - Escadrille 7C1 - Escadrille 6C3

Kingdom of Italy

- Regia Aeronautica - One D.1bis and 112 D.1ter built by Ansaldo

Japan

- One D.1bis aircraft.

Switzerland

- Swiss Air Force - Two D.1bis aircraft.

Kingdom of Yugoslavia

- Royal Yugoslav Air Force - 79 D.1 built by Zmaj

== Specifications (D.1.01) ==
D.1 6-view. French prototype and the later C1 model produced in Zmaj. The Yugoslav one is shown with skis instead of wheels, which were used in winter conditions.

General characteristics

- Crew: one
- Length: 7.50 m (24 ft 7.25 in)
- Wingspan: 11.50 m (37 ft 8.75 in)
- Height: 2.75 m (9 ft 0 in)
- Wing area: 20.00 m^{2} (215.29 sq ft)
- Empty weight: 820 kg (1,808 lb)
- Gross weight: 1,240 kg (2,734 lb)
- Powerplant: 1 × Hispano-Suiza 8Fb V-8 inline liquid-cooled engine , 224 kW (300 hp)

Performance

- Maximum speed: 255 km/h (158 mph, 137 kn)
- Range: 400 km (249 mi, 216 nmi)
- Service ceiling: 8,000 m (26,245 ft)
- Rate of climb: 7.50 m/s (1,476 ft/min)

Armament

- 2 × fuselage-mounted synchronised 7.7 mm (0.303 in) Vickers machine guns

== See also ==
Related lists

- List of Interwar military aircraft

== Bibliography ==
- Alegi, Gregory (September 1998b). "Ansaldo AC.2, 3 et 4: les Dewoitine italiens (dernière partie)" [Ansaldo AC.2, 3 and 4: Italian Dewoitines]. Avions: Toute l'aéronautique et son histoire (in French) (66): 40–44. ISSN 1243-8650.
- Alegi, Gregory (August 1998a). "Ansaldo AC.2, 3 et 4: les Dewoitine italiens (première partie)" [Ansaldo AC.2, 3 and 4: Italian Dewoitines]. Avions: Toute l'aéronautique et son histoire (in French) (65): 17–21. ISSN 1243-8650.
- Bruner, Georges (1977). "Fighters a la Francaise, Part One". Air Enthusiast (3): 85–95. ISSN 0143-5450.
- Cortet, Pierre (April 1997). "Les premières chasseurs d'Emile Dewoitine (deuxième partie)" [The First Fighters of Emile Dewoitine]. Avions: Toute l'aéronautique et son histoire (in French) (49): 10–13. ISSN 1243-8650.
- Danel, Raymond; Cuny, Jean (1982). Les Avions Dewotine. Docavia (in French). Paris: Éditions Larivère.
- Donald, David, ed. (1997). The Encyclopedia of World Aircraft. Prospero Books. p. 333. ISBN 1-85605-375-X.
- Green, William; Swanborough, Gordon (1994). The Complete Book of fighters. London: Salamander Books Limited. ISBN 1-85833-777-1.
- Morareau, Lucien (May 1998). "Le Dewoitine D1.C1 en service dans l'Aviation maritime française (1ère partie)" [The Dewoitine D1 in Service With French Naval Aviation]. Avions: Toute l'aéronautique et son histoire (in French) (62): 36–41. ISSN 1243-8650.
- Morareau, Lucien (June 1998). "Le Dewoitine D1.C1 en service dans l'Aviation maritime française (2ème partie)". Avions: Toute l'aéronautique et son histoire (in French) (63): 38–43. ISSN 1243-8650.
- Gentilli, Roberto (1982). L'aviazione da caccia italiana 1918-1939, Volume II. Firenze.
