= D26 =

D26 may refer to:

== Ships ==
- ARA Hipólito Bouchard (D-26), an Allen M. Sumner-class destroyer of the Argentine Navy
- Brazilian destroyer Mariz e Barros (D26), a Gearing-class destroyer of the Brazilian Navy
- HMS Slinger (D26), a Ruler-class escort carrier of the Royal Navy
- HMS Watchman (D26), a W-class destroyer of the Royal Navy

== Other uses ==
- D26 road (Croatia)
- Dewoitine D.26, a French military trainer aircraft
- IVL D.26 Haukka I, a Finnish prototype fighter aircraft
- LNER Class D26, a class of British steam locomotives
