= Dewoitine HD.412 =

HD.412
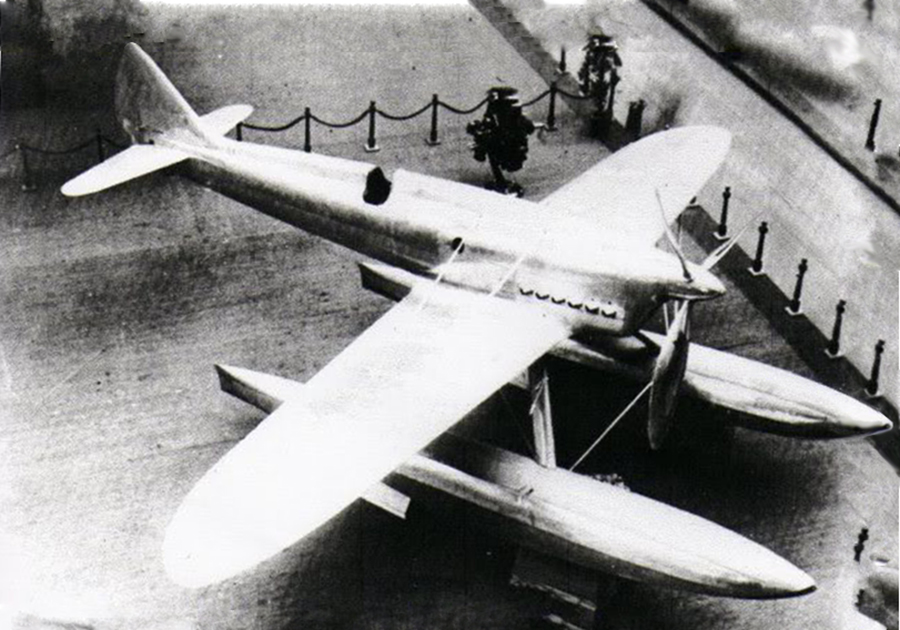

General information
- Type: Racing floatplane
- National origin: France
- Manufacturer: Dewoitine
- Status: Prototype
- Number built: 1

History
- First flight: 1931

The Dewoitine HD.412 was a prototype French racing floatplane of the 1930s.

== Design ==
The HD.412 was a low-wing monoplane racer of all-metal construction. It used floats for takeoff and landing on water.

== Variants ==
Dewoitine HD.412 in 1932

D.40
1929 : racing trainer (project)
HD.40
1930 : seaplane, racing trainer, derivative of the D.40 (project)
D.41
1930 : racing trainer (project)
HD.41
1930 : seaplane, racing trainer, derivative of the D.41 (project)
HD.41
1930 : seaplane, racer
HD.410
1930 : renamed racer HD.41
HD.411
1931 : seaplane, racer (project)
HD.412
1931

== Specifications ==
Data from

General characteristics

- Crew: one
- Length: 8.70 m (28 ft 7 in)
- Wingspan: 9.60 m (31 ft 6 in)
- Height: 3.70 m (12 ft 2 in)
- Wing area: 11.148 m^{2} (120.00 sq ft)
- Empty weight: 727 kg (1,602 lb)
- Gross weight: 944 kg (2,082 lb)
- Powerplant: 1 × Hispano-Suiza 18R W-18 liquid-cooled piston engine, 1,200 kW (1,600 hp)

Performance

- Maximum speed: 565 km/h (351 mph, 305 kn)

== See also ==
Related lists

- List of flying boats and floatplanes
