= Dewoitine =

French aircraft manufacturer

Constructions Aéronautiques Émile Dewoitine was a French aircraft manufacturer established in Toulouse by Émile Dewoitine in October 1920. The company's initial products were a range of metal parasol-wing fighters, which were largely ignored by the French Air Force but purchased in large quantities abroad and licence-built in Italy, Switzerland, and Czechoslovakia. The company was liquidated in January 1927, with the only remaining active programme (the D.27) being transferred to EKW in Switzerland.

The company was then re-established in Paris in March of the following year as Société Aéronautique Française (Avions Dewoitine) or SAF. After briefly continuing D.27 production, the reconstituted firm produced a range of fighters, the D.500 family, that became a mainstay of the French Air Force during the 1930s.

It also developed important civilian airliners, such as the D.333 and its derivative the D.338, designed for pioneering routes to French Indochina (now Vietnam), and eventually Hong Kong.

The firm was nationalised in March 1937 into the short-lived SNCA du Midi, or SNCAM, and produced the D.520. This was France's best-performing fighter at the outbreak of war, though production delays meant too few were produced to pose any serious opposition to the Luftwaffe during the Battle of France.

The end of Dewoitine as an individual business entity came with its absorption into SNCASE in December 1940, by which time Émile Dewoitine had departed to establish SIPA. No further aircraft were produced under the Dewoitine name.

== Aircraft ==
- Dewoitine D.1
- Dewoitine D.2 project
- Dewoitine D.3 project
- Dewoitine D.4 project
- Dewoitine D.5 project
- Dewoitine D.6 project
- Dewoitine D.7
- Dewoitine D.9
- Dewoitine D.10 project
- Dewoitine D.13 project
- Dewoitine D.14
- Dewoitine D.15
- Dewoitine D.17 project
- Dewoitine D.18 project
- Dewoitine D.19
- Dewoitine D.21
- Dewoitine D.22 project
- Dewoitine D.23 project
- Dewoitine D.24 project
- Dewoitine D.25
- Dewoitine D.26
- Dewoitine D.27
- Dewoitine D.28
- Dewoitine D.30
- Dewoitine D.33
- Dewoitine D.35
- Dewoitine D.332
- Dewoitine D.338
- Dewoitine D.371
- Dewoitine D.372
- Dewoitine D.420 project
- Dewoitine D.430
- Dewoitine D.440 project
- Dewoitine D.450 project
- Dewoitine D.470 project
- Dewoitine D.480
- Dewoitine D.481
- Dewoitine D.490 project
- Dewoitine D.500
- Dewoitine D.513
- Dewoitine D.520
- Dewoitine D.551
- Dewoitine D.560
- Dewoitine D.580 project
- Dewoitine D.590 project
- Dewoitine D.600 project
- Dewoitine D.640 project
- Dewoitine D.650 project
- Dewoitine D.660 project
- Dewoitine D.680 project
- Dewoitine D.710 project
- Dewoitine D.720
- Dewoitine D.750
- Dewoitine D.760 project
- Dewoitine D.770
- Dewoitine D.800 project
- Dewoitine D.810 project
- Dewoitine D.820 project
- Dewoitine D.860 project
- Dewoitine D.900 project
- Dewoitine HD.412
- Dewoitine HD.460 project
- Dewoitine HD.730
- Dewoitine P-1
