= Potez 24 =

General information
- Type: Observation aircraft
- National origin: France
- Manufacturer: Aéroplanes Henry Potez
- Number built: 1

History
- First flight: late summer 1924

The Potez 24 A.2 was a mid-1920s French biplane intended to replace the Potez 15 as an army observation aircraft. The further improved and larger Potez 25 was preferred for production.

== Design and development ==
The Potez 24 was designed to fill the same two seat army co-operation role (French military category A.2) as the Potez 15 but with performance improved by extra power and a new, wing design.

Both upper and lower wings were rectangular in plan, with the lower one both shorter in span and smaller in chord. Each was built around a pair of spars and was wood-framed and fabric covered. The upper wing was in three parts; the centre section, held over the fuselage with four vertical cabane struts, had a trailing edge cut-out to improve the crew's field of view. The lower wing was in two parts, joined to the lower fuselage longerons. The Potez 24 was a single bay biplane with pairs of parallel, outward-leaning dural interplane struts between the spars, aided by wire bracing. It had only 100 mm (3.94 in) of stagger and, compared with the Potez 15, the 1.80 m (5 ft 11 in) interplane gap was larger. There were long, broad ailerons on the upper wing alone.

The engine mounting of the Potez 24 drew contemporary interest because it allowed for the installation of several different motors, for example the W12, water-cooled 340 kW (450 hp) Lorraine 12E Courlis and the similar Hispano-Suiza 12Ga. Engine and frame swaps involved only disconnection of supply and control lines and the removal of four bolts. The radiator was in the nose ahead of the engine, its segmental shape allowing a neat, rounded upper cowling.

Aft, the fuselage was flat-sided apart from rounded decking. The pilot's cockpit was below the upper wing cut-out, with the observer/machine gunner close behind. The empennage of the Potez 24 was conventional, with a rectangular plan tailplane on top of the fuselage carrying wider, balanced elevators. A broad fin carried the generous rudder.

The Potez 24 had a fixed, tailskid undercarriage with a 2.0 m (6 ft 7 in) track. Its single axle, enclosed in a fairing, was joined to the lower fuselage longerons by near-vertical, telescopic shock absorbing legs and faired, rearward drag struts. Instead of the usual cross-wires the structure had a single diagonal cross-bracing tube. The tailskid was rubber-sprung.

The date of the first flight of the Potez 24 is not known but had taken place shortly before the beginning of September 1924. Towards the end of 1924 Potez flew the rather similar but larger type 25, which shared amongst other things a biplane layout and the quick-change engine mountings. After comparative tests of the two types at Villacoublay test centre in the spring of 1925 the Army preferred the later model, awarding it a contract, and development of the Potez 24 ceased.

== Specifications (Lorraine engine) ==
Data from L'Aéronautique, October 1924

General characteristics

- Crew: Two
- Length: 8.20 m (26 ft 11 in)
- Upper wingspan: 12.94 m (42 ft 5 in)
- Lower wingspan: 9 m (29 ft 6 in)
- Height: 3.42 m (11 ft 3 in)
- Wing area: 44 m^{2} (470 sq ft)
- Empty weight: 1,188 kg (2,619 lb)
- Gross weight: 1,848 kg (4,074 lb)
- Fuel capacity: 320 L (70 imp gal; 85 US gal)
- Powerplant: 1 × Lorraine 12E Courlis liquid-cooled W12 engine, 340 kW (450 hp)
- Propellers: 2-bladed

Performance

- Maximum speed: 224 km/h (139 mph, 121 kn) at ground level
- Service ceiling: 7,300 m (24,000 ft)
