= Dewoitine D.35 =

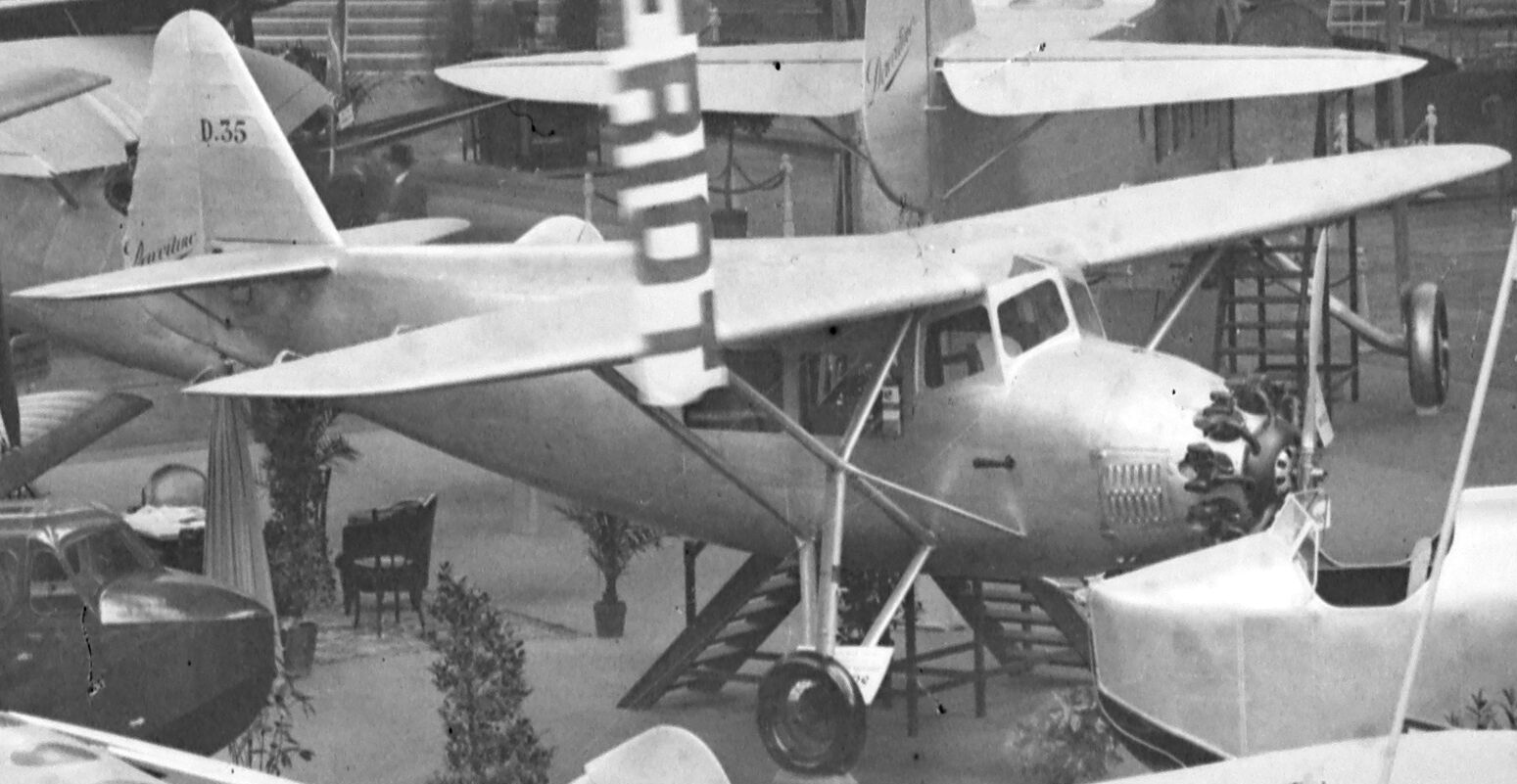
- Dewoitine D.35 exposed at Salon d’Aviation 1930 in Paris.

General information
- Type: Four passenger transport
- National origin: France
- Manufacturer: Sociéty Aéronautique Dewoitine

History
- First flight: 1931

The Dewoitine D.35 was a small, single-engine passenger transport aircraft built and flown by Dewoitine in France for their own use in the early 1930s. Only one was produced.

== Design and development ==
The D.35 was built solely as a company taxi to carry Dewoitine personnel between Paris and Toulouse. It was a high wing strut braced monoplane with its passenger cabin under the wing. The D.35's 230 hp (170 kW) Hispano-Suiza 9Qb radial engine was uncowled. The undercarriage was wide track, with single mainwheels on V-form struts mounted on the fuselage; a small tailskid completed the conventional landing gear.

== Operational history ==
The D.35 was registered in February 1932 after about a year of testing. During the testing period, on the first weekend in July 1931, the D.35 attended an aviation meeting at Clermont-Ferrand, where it was one of sixty-six aircraft competing in the International Rally. This was a test of economical load-carrying, the aim being to achieve the maximum value of (distance flown)^{2}×people on board/engine power. Stops were allowed but the total distance had to be flown within eight hours. The D.35, piloted by George Delage and carrying six passengers, flew 1,573 km (977 mi) and managed third place.

In 1933 the D.35 became the personal aircraft of Dewoitine's chief test pilot, Marcel Doret. There is no record of it on the French register after 1937, prompting speculation that it may have gone to Spain for government use in the Spanish Civil War.

== Specifications ==
Data from Howson

General characteristics

- Capacity: four passengers
- Length: 9.18 m (30 ft 1 in)
- Wingspan: 12.16 m (39 ft 11 in)
- Wing area: 24.6 m^{2} (265 sq ft)
- Empty weight: 895.7 kg (1,975 lb)
- Gross weight: 1,612 kg (3,554 lb)
- Powerplant: 1 × Hispano-Suiza 9Qb 9-cylinder radial, 170 kW (230 hp)

Performance

- Maximum speed: 205 km/h (127 mph, 111 kn) at ground level
