= Dewoitine D.7 =

D.7
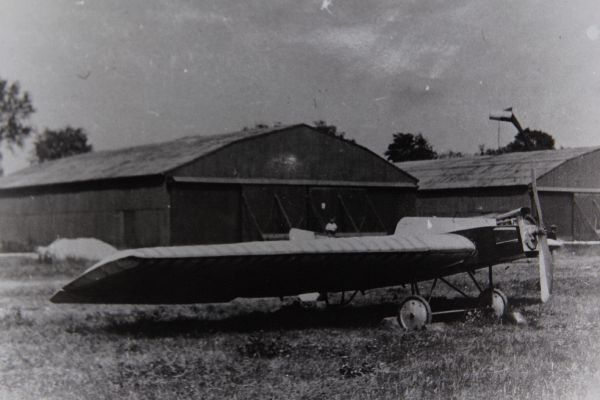

General information
- Type: ultralight sport plane
- Manufacturer: Dewoitine
- Designer: Emile Dewoitine
- Number built: ~5-10

History
- First flight: c.1924

The Dewoitine D.7 was a French sport plane built in the mid 1920s.

== Development ==
The D.7 was a conventionally laid-out monoplane, with a thick cantilever shoulder wing. Its single seat, open cockpit, provided with a small windscreen, was over the wing. It had conventional, fixed, tailskid landing gear.

The D.7 could be powered by any small engine; the Salmson AD.3 radial engine, the Clerget 2K flat twin, Vaslin flat-four or Vaslin water-cooled six cylinder inline engines were fitted.

== Operators ==
Japan

- One aircraft was sold to the Japanese Army.

== Specifications (AD.3 engine) ==
General characteristics

- Crew: 1
- Length: 5.60 m (18 ft 4.5 in)
- Wingspan: 12.60 m (41 ft 4 in)
- Wing area: 15.00 m^{2} (161.46 sq ft)
- Gross weight: 250 kg (551 lb)
- Powerplant: 1 × Salmson 3Ad three-cylinder radial engine , 9.0 kW (12 hp)

Performance

- Maximum speed: 90 km/h (56 mph, 49 kn)
- Endurance: 5 hours
- Service ceiling: 3,000 m (9,840 ft)
