= Lorraine 12E Courlis =

1920s French piston aircraft engine

12E Courlis
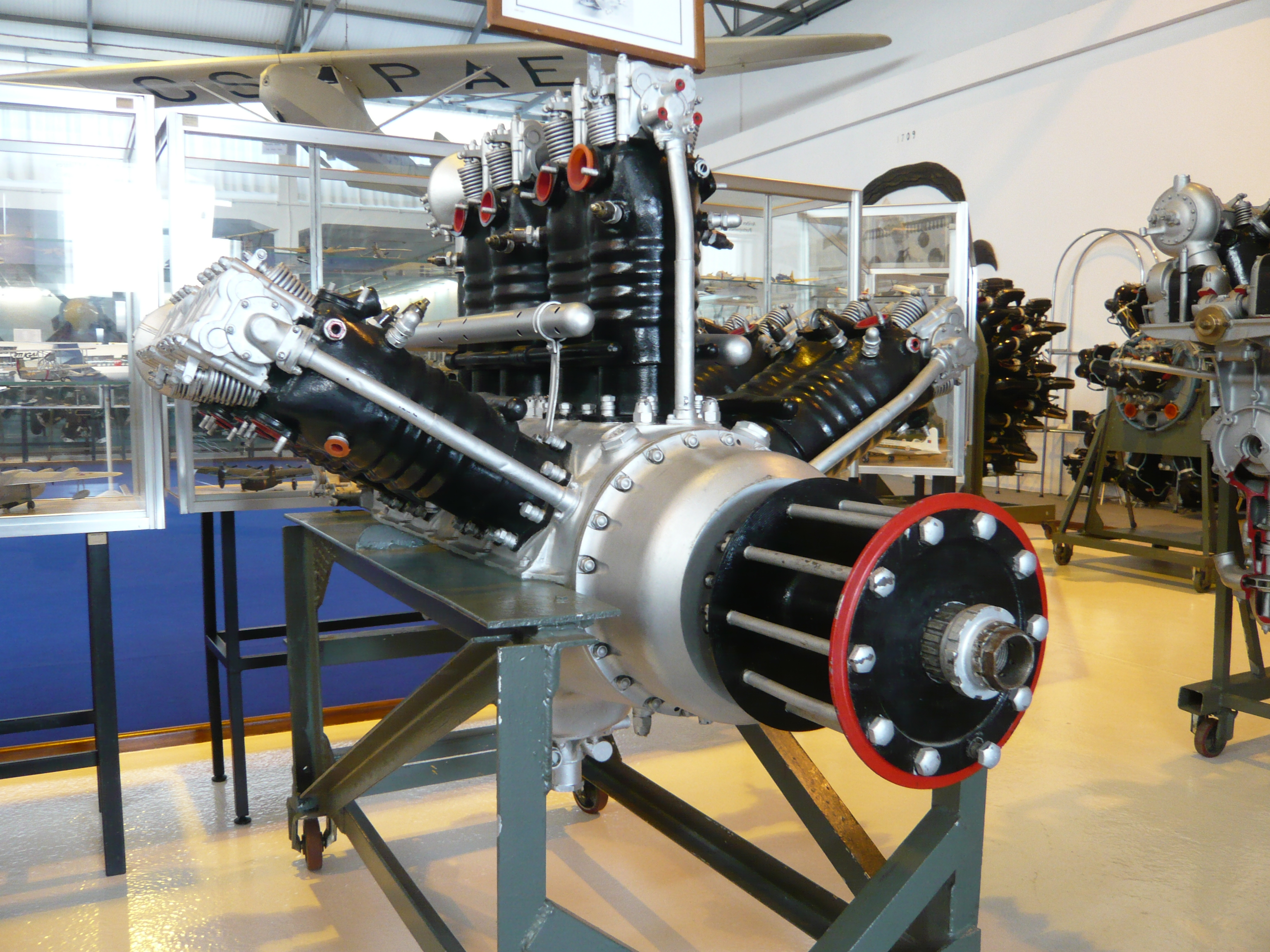
- Type: Piston aero engine
- National origin: France
- Manufacturer: Lorraine-Dietrich
- First run: 1922

The Lorraine 12E Courlis was a W-12 (broad arrow) aero engine produced by the French company Lorraine-Dietrich during the 1920s and 1930s.

== Variants ==
12E
12Eb
12Ebr
12Ed
12Edr
12Ee
12Ew
The standard Eb fitted with a supplementary supercharger.
Elizalde A
The 12E built under licence in Spain by Elizalde S.A.

12E
Made under licence by the Polish Skoda Works (PZS)

== Applications ==
=== Aircraft ===
- Aichi AB-1
- Bernard SIMB V.1
- Blériot-SPAD S.86
- Breguet 19
- Canete Pirata
- Caudron C.17
- Dewoitine D.12
- Dewoitine D.25
- FMA AeT.1
- Grigorovich MR-2
- Grigorovich ROM-1
- Hiro H1H
- Levasseur PL.4
- Levasseur PL.5
- Levasseur PL.8
- Lioré et Olivier LeO H-134
- Potez 24
- Potez 25
- Potez 26
- PWS-10
- Rohrbach Ro IIIa Rodra
- SET 2
- Villiers II
- Villiers XXIV
- Wibault 73
- Yokosuka E1Y

=== Other applications ===
- Argentine Nahuel tank

== Specifications (12Ed) ==
Data from Gunston.

=== General characteristics ===
- Type: 12-cylinder piston engine W-12 °60
- Bore: 120 mm (4.72 in)
- Stroke: 180 mm (7.1 in)
- Displacement: 24.4 L (1,491 cu in)
- Length: 54.1 in (1,370 mm)
- Width: 47.6 in (1,210 mm)
- Height: 44.8 in (1,140 mm)
- Dry weight: 822 lb (373 kg)

=== Components ===
- Valvetrain: single intake and single exhaust valves per cylinder actuated via double overhead camshaft
- Fuel system: carburettor
- Fuel type: Petrol
- Cooling system: Liquid-cooled

=== Performance ===
- Power output: 336 kW (450 hp) at 1,850 rpm
- Compression ratio: 6.0:1

== See also ==
Comparable engines

- Farman 12We
- Napier Lion
- Sunbeam Kaffir

Related lists

- List of aircraft engines
