= Voisin Icare Aero-Yacht =

1910s French flying boat

Voisin Icare Aero-yacht

General information
- National origin: France
- Manufacturer: Voisin Frères
- Designer: Gabriel Voisin
- Number built: 1

History
- First flight: 23 November 1912

The Voisin Icare Aero-yacht was an early flying boat built by Voisin Frères for the oil magnate and promoter of early aviation experimentation Henry Deutsch de la Meurthe. It first flew in 1912.

== Design and development ==
It was initially built as a four-bay unequal-span biplane. The wings, which had trailing edge ailerons mounted on the upper surfaces only, were mounted on top of a Ricochet motorboat hull. A 200 hp (150 kW) Clerget engine drove a four bladed pusher configuration propeller mounted mid-gap via a chain. The inverted-T configuration empennage was mounted on booms. It carried six passengers, and had provision for an armament of two cannon.

It was later modified by extending the lower wing and fitting inset ailerons to both upper and lower wings.

It was first flown as a landplane on 23 November 1912 at Issy-les-Moulineaux with the full complement of six passengers.

== Specifications ==
Data from Opdycke 1999 p.270

General characteristics

- Crew: 1
- Capacity: 6
- Length: 12.5 m (41 ft 0 in)
- Wingspan: 22.5 m (73 ft 10 in)
- Wing area: 62.5 m^{2} (673 sq ft)
- Gross weight: 2,050 kg (4,519 lb)
- Powerplant: 1 × Clerget , 150 kW (200 hp)
- Propellers: 4-bladed

Performance

- Maximum speed: 110 km/h (68 mph, 59 kn)
