= Levasseur PL.5 =

PL.5 and PL.9
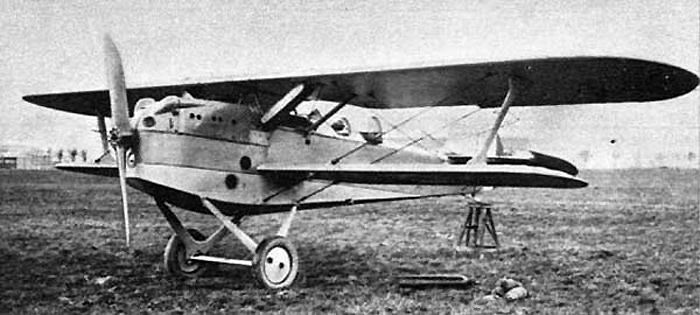
- PL.5

General information
- Type: Carrier-based fighter
- National origin: France
- Manufacturer: Levasseur
- Primary user: Aéronavale
- Number built: 24 PL.5, plus 6 PL.9

History
- First flight: 1924

The Levasseur PL.5 was a carrier-based fighter produced in France in the late 1920s, in response to the 1924 AMBC.2 (two seat carrier based fighter) specification issued by the Service Technique de l'Aéronautique (STAé). It was a conventional, single-bay sesquiplane that carried a crew of two in tandem, open cockpits. Like other Levasseur naval designs of the day, it incorporated several safety features in case of ditching at sea. Apart from small floats attached directly to the undersides of the lower wing, the main units of the fixed, tail-skid undercarriage could be jettisoned in flight, and the underside of the fuselage was given a boat-like shape and made watertight.

Four prototypes were evaluated by the Aéronavale in 1924, and following successful trials, an order for 20 machines was placed to equip the aircraft carrier Béarn, enterring service in 1927.

Six examples of a trainer version with a lower-powered engine were purchased as the PL.9.

== Variants ==
Levasseur V AM B-C.2
3x prototypes with 340 kW (450 hp) Hispano-Suiza 12Ha engine
Levasseur V C.2B
1x prototype with Renault 12Kd engine.
PL.5
production version with 340 kW (450 hp) Lorraine-Dietrich 12Eb engine; 20 built.
PL.9
trainer version with a 250 kW (330 hp) Hispano-Suiza 8Se V-8 engine; 6 built.

== Operators ==
France

- Aéronavale
  - Escadrille 7C1

== Specifications (V AM C.2B) ==
Data from Jane's all the World's Aircraft 1928, Aviafrance:Levasseur PL 5 C2B

General characteristics

- Crew: 2
- Length: 8.615 m (28 ft 3 in)
- Wingspan: 12.366 m (40 ft 7 in)
- Height: 3.22 m (10 ft 7 in)
- Wing area: 37 m^{2} (400 sq ft)
- Empty weight: 1,430 kg (3,153 lb)
- Gross weight: 2,030 kg (4,475 lb)
- Powerplant: 1 × Renault 12Kd V-12 water-cooled piston engine, 360 kW (480 hp)
- Propellers: 2-bladed fixed pitch propeller

Performance

- Maximum speed: 200 km/h (120 mph, 110 kn) ; 185 km/h (115 mph; 100 kn) at 4,000 m (13,000 ft)
- Range: 800 km (500 mi, 430 nmi)
- Service ceiling: 6,000 m (20,000 ft)
- Wing loading: 55 kg/m^{2} (11 lb/sq ft)
- Power/mass: 0.166 kW/kg (0.101 hp/lb)

Armament

- Guns: 2x fixed forward firing 7.7 mm (0.303 in) Vickers machine-guns in the forward fuselage, with 2x 7.7 mm (0.303 in) Lewis machine-guns on a Scarff ring in the rear cockpit.

== See also ==
Aircraft of comparable role, configuration, and era

- Villiers II

Related lists

- List of Interwar military aircraft
