= Dewoitine D.21 =

D.21
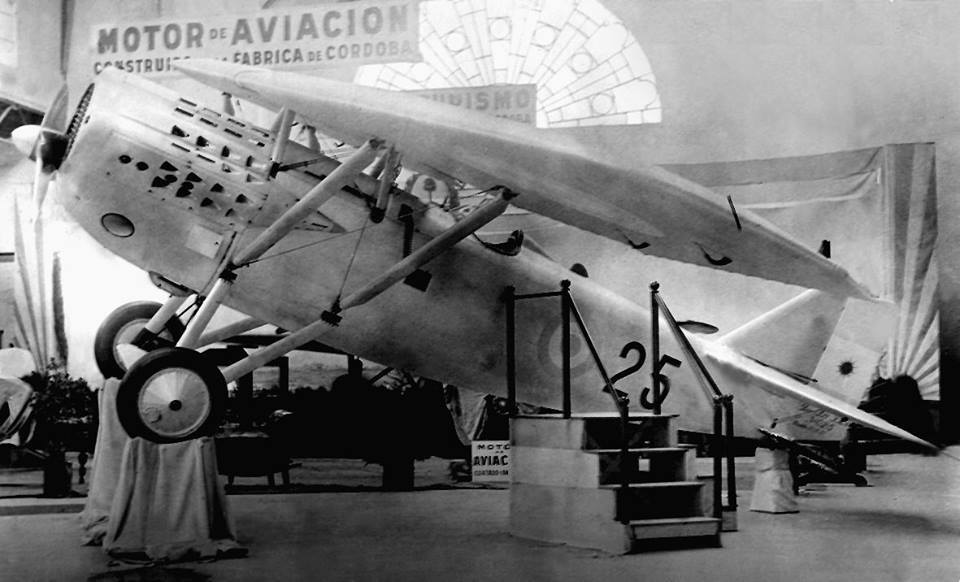
- Argentine Dewoitine D.21

General information
- Type: Fighter
- Manufacturer: Dewoitine

History
- First flight: 1925

The Dewoitine D.21 was a 1920s French open-cockpit, fixed-undercarriage, parasol winged monoplane fighter aircraft.

== Design and development ==
The prototype D.21 was a development of the D.12. The aircraft was license-built in Switzerland (by EKW), Czechoslovakia (by Skoda and known as the Skoda-Dewoitine D.1) and Argentina (by FMA). One Turkish D.21 was fitted with a modified wing and named Orhanelli.

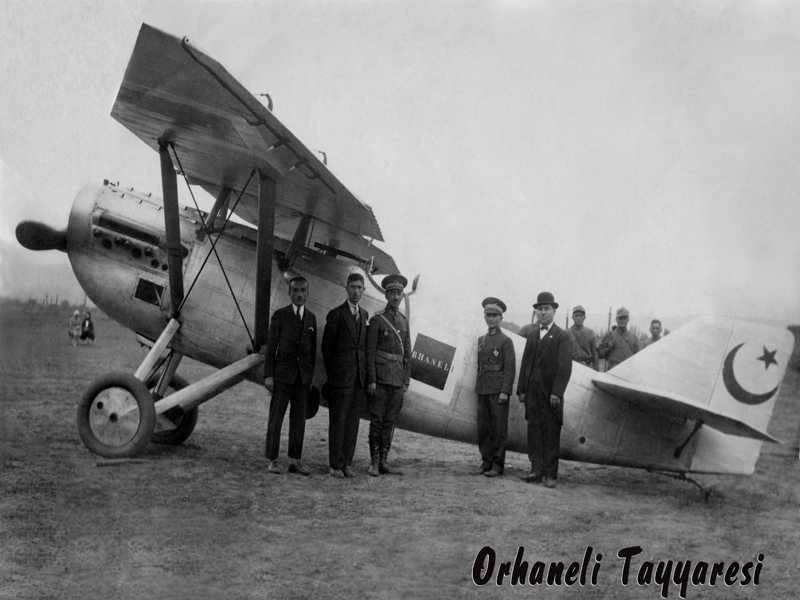
Orhanelli; a Dewoitine D.21 fitted with a modified wing for record-breaking flights.

== Operational history ==
Argentina bought seven French-built D.21s, and built another 38 under license by FMA from 1929 to 1932. The type remained in service until 1941. Turkey bought a number, and Czechoslovakia built 25 for their air force.

== Variants ==
D.21 C.1
French Production version, license-built in Argentina and Turkey.
Skoda D.1
Licence manufacture of the Dewoitine D.21 in Czechoslovakia by Skoda;(26 built - included in D.9 total). Škoda L was a licence-built Hispanio Suiza HS-50. Armament only 2 × 7.7 mm (0.303 in) Vickers machine-guns

== Operators ==
Argentina

- Army Aviation Service
- Argentine Naval Aviation

Czechoslovakia

- Gendarmerie (Czechoslovakia)

Paraguay

- Paraguayan Air Force

Switzerland
Turkey

- Turkish Air Force

== Specifications (D.21 C.1) ==
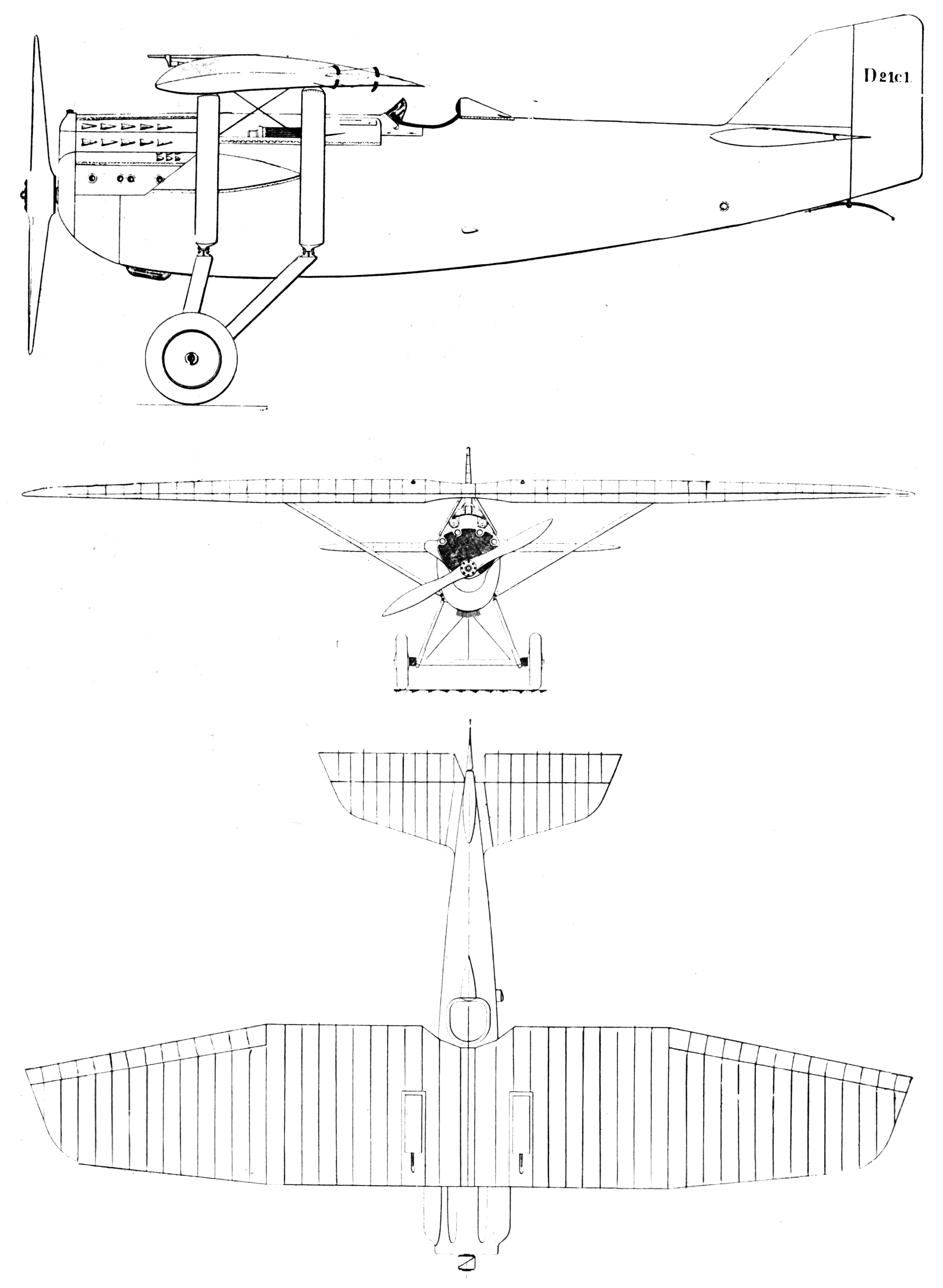
Dewoitine D.21 3-view drawing from L'Air May 15, 1928

Data from Jane's all the World's Aircraft 1928, The encyclopedia of world aircraft

General characteristics

- Crew: 1
- Length: 7.925 m (26 ft 0 in)
- Wingspan: 12.8 m (42 ft 0 in)
- Height: 3.32 m (10 ft 11 in)
- Wing area: 25 m^{2} (270 sq ft)
- Empty weight: 1,090 kg (2,403 lb)
- Gross weight: 1,590 kg (3,505 lb)
- Fuel capacity: 250 kg (550 lb) (ca. 175 L (46 US gal; 38 imp gal))
- Powerplant: 1 × Hispano-Suiza 12Gb W-12 water-cooled piston engine, 370 kW (500 hp)
- Propellers: 2-bladed fixed pitch propeller

Performance

- Maximum speed: 267 km/h (166 mph, 144 kn) at sea level

262 km/h (163 mph; 141 kn) at 2,000 m (6,600 ft)
258 km/h (160 mph; 139 kn) at 3,000 m (9,800 ft)
254 km/h (158 mph; 137 kn) at 4,000 m (13,000 ft)
250 km/h (160 mph; 130 kn) at 5,000 m (16,000 ft)

- Range: 400 km (250 mi, 220 nmi)
- Service ceiling: 8,991 m (29,498 ft)
- Rate of climb: 10 m/s (2,000 ft/min)
- Time to altitude: 4,000 m (13,000 ft) in 8 minutes 4 seconds

5,000 m (16,000 ft) in 11 minutes 17 seconds

- Wing loading: 63.6 kg/m^{2} (13.0 lb/sq ft)
- Power/mass: 0.2694 kW/kg (0.1639 hp/lb)

Armament

- Guns: 2 × fuselage-mounted synchronised 7.7 mm (0.303 in) Vickers machine-guns and 2 × wing-mounted 7.5 mm (0.295 in) Darne machine-guns in the centre section (optional)

== See also ==
Related development

- Dewoitine D.25

Related lists

- List of Interwar military aircraft
