= Dewoitine D.25 =

Fighter aircraft

D.25
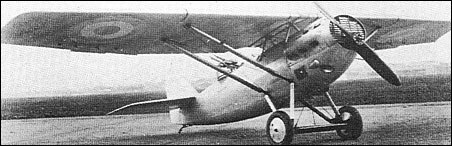

General information
- Type: Tandem two seat fighter aircraft
- National origin: France
- Manufacturer: Dewoitine
- Number built: 5

History
- First flight: 1926
- Developed from: Dewoitine D.21

The Dewoitine D.25 was a single-engine, two-seat, parasol-wing fighter aircraft built in France in the 1920s. The 1925 French two-seat fighter programme was cancelled before any orders were placed, but four examples were exported to Argentina.

== Design and development ==
The D.25 was a tandem two-seat version of the Dewoitine D.21 single-seat, parasol-wing fighter, developed to the 1925 C2 (2 seat Chasseur or fighter) programme from the Section Technique de l'Aéronautique (Technical Section of Aeronautics, STAé) for an aircraft capable of daytime and nighttime fighter duty and daytime reconnaissance.

The chief structural difference between the two models, which shared the same span and length, was the D.25's second cockpit itself and the fuselage strengthening around it to allow a gun mounting. Though the two-seater was heavier, it had a less powerful engine: it used a 450 hp (336 kW) Lorraine-Dietrich 12Eb water-cooled upright W-12 instead of the similarly arranged 500 hp (373 kW) Hispano-Suiza 12Gb. Both the D.21 and D.25 had much in common with the Dewoitine D.12 of 1924. For example, the D.25's parasol wing was similar to that of the D.12, with the same span, a constant chord inner panel, outer sections tapered on both the leading and trailing edges but chiefly on the latter, ending in blunt tips. It was braced to the lower fuselage by a parallel pair of long struts on each side. The D.12 and D.25 used the same Lorraine-Dietrich engine with a circular nose-mounted radiator immediately behind the propeller.

Flight testing of the D.25 began in 1926 but the STAé dropped the 1925 C2 programme. Dewoitine therefore sought to export it and in 1928 gained an order for four from Argentina. These were armed with two pairs of fixed 7.9 mm (0.311 in) Madsen machine guns, one fixed and fitted with synchronisation, firing forward through the propeller arc, and the other on a gun mounting in the rear cockpit. The construction of these machines was sub-contracted to the Hanriot aircraft company.

== Operators ==
Argentina

- Army Aviation Service

== Specifications ==
Data from Green and Swanborough p.177

General characteristics

- Crew: Two
- Length: 7.64 m (25 ft 1 in)
- Wingspan: 12.80 m (42 ft 0 in)
- Height: 3.00 m (9 ft 10 in)
- Wing area: 24.80 m^{2} (266.9 sq ft)
- Empty weight: 1,182 kg (2,606 lb)
- Gross weight: 1,750 kg (3,858 lb)
- Powerplant: 1 × Lorraine-Dietrich 12Eb water-cooled upright W-12, 340 kW (450 hp)
- Propellers: 2-bladed

Performance

- Maximum speed: 222 km/h (138 mph, 120 kn) at 1,000 m (3,280 ft)
- Endurance: 2.0 hr

Armament

- Guns: 2 × fixed 7.9 mm (0.311 in) synchronised Madsen machine gun firing through propeller arc and 2 × similar guns on mounting in rear cockpit.
