= Villiers II =

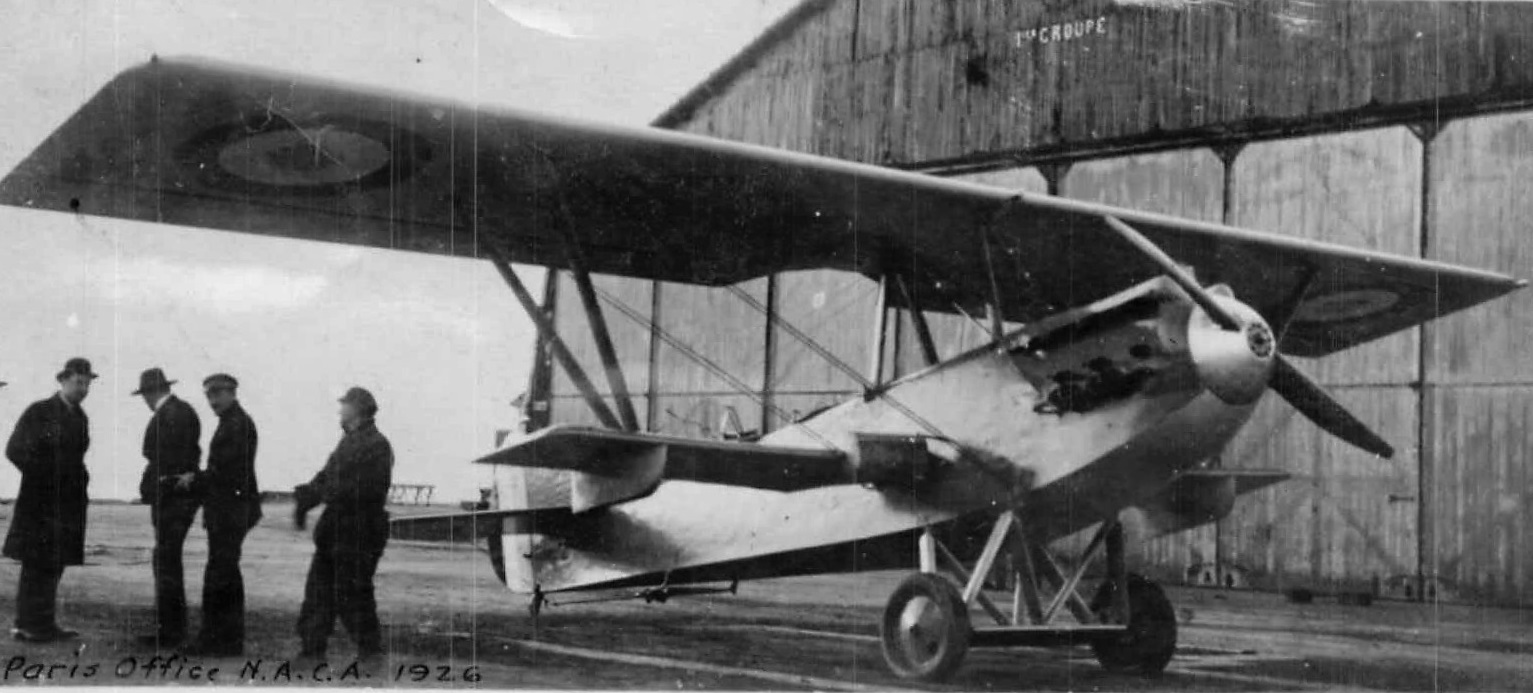

General information
- Type: Fighter aircraft
- National origin: France
- Manufacturer: Ateliers d'Aviation François Villiers
- Primary user: Aéronautique Maritime
- Number built: 32

History
- Introduction date: 1927
- First flight: 1925
- Retired: 1928

The Villiers II was a twin-seat navalised fighter aircraft designed and produced by the French aircraft manufacturer Ateliers d'Aviation François Villiers.

One of the first aircraft designed by the company, it was developed with the intention of being operated from the French Navy's Aircraft carrier Béarn. It was a single-engined tractor biplane with a waterproof hull in the form of a flying boat to allow the aircraft to be safely landed on water in an emergency. Performing its maiden flight in 1925, the type entered service two years later. In total, two prototypes and 30 production aircraft were built; it had a relatively brief service life with the French Navy, during which time it was never operated from an aircraft carrier.

== Development and design ==
During 1924, the French aircraft manufacturer Ateliers d'Aviation François Villiers was formed at Meudon near Paris. One of its first designs was to meet a requirement of the French Navy for a two-seat shipboard fighter. Villier's design, referred to as the Villiers II, was a single-engined sesquiplane (i.e. a biplane with the lower wing much smaller than the upper wing). It was specifically designed to fulfil the conditions of the Saint Raphael contest; to this end, it was designed to possess comparable aerodynamic qualities to contemporary land-based aircraft, such speed, altitude ceiling, and manoeuvrability (permitting its effective use in the pursuit role), but also to permit the aircraft to alight on the water, akin to a seaplane.

Two prototypes were ordered, under the designation Vil 2AMC2 (Avion Marin Chasse Biplace), one powered by a 450 hp (338 kW) Hispano-Suiza 12H V12 engine and the other with a similarly powered Lorraine-Dietrich 12Eb W12 engine. During February 1925, the aircraft completed its maritime acceptance tests, after which it was promptly entered into the Saint Raphael contest, where its performance was competitively evaluated against other entrants. During the contest, it was judged to possess particularly good alighting capability; it reportedly took in less than 20 liters of water while floating upon the water for six hours. The aircraft was awarded a prize by the judges, which heavily contributed towards its subsequent procurement by the French Navy.

During May 1925, it underwent a formal evaluation by the Aéronautique Maritime. Shortly thereafter, an order for 30 Vil 2AMC2 to be powered by the Lorraine-Dietrich engine, (together with an order for 20 of the competing Levasseur PL.5s) was placed on 19 December 1925.

== Design ==
The Villiers II was a twin-seat navalised sesquiplane fighter aircraft. The pilot was seated just aft of the wings in a position that provided favourable lateral and vertical visibility, Behind the pilot's cockpit was a separate gunner's position, which was provisioned with a pair of flexibly mounted Lewis guns in rear cockpit; a fixed forward-firing pair of 7.7 mm (0.303 in) Vickers guns were also present, the latter being synchronised to the engine. Amenities such as heating and electrical lighting were also provided for the crew.

The lower wings joined with the fuselage only a little above the water line while the upper wing attached to the fuselage via a cabane comprising four oblique struts. Each half-call was braced using a pair of V-shaped struts and diagonal bracing wires while the structure was composed of wood. The exterior of the wings was covered with fabric. The upper wing was furnished with a pair of narrow unbalanced ailerons. A pair of compact floats were present underneath the tips of the lower wings to ensure the aircraft's lateral stability while on the water.

The aircraft, despite possessing a conventional tractor configuration (which placed the engine within the nose to drive a twin-bladed propeller) and using a tailwheel undercarriage, it had a number of unusual features, some of which permitted it to be safely ditched in the water in the event of an emergency. Accordingly, the fuselage, which was shaped in the form of a flying boat hull and had a plywood covering, was internally divided into watertight compartments while the underside was carefully streamlined. Furthermore, the undercarriage incorporated a special device that lifted it while performing a water landing to avoid the risk of instability and reduce the difficulty involved.

The undercarriage comprised a pair of lateral V-shaped struts that supported a horizontal rigidly-braced axel, complete with shock absorbers. A compact tail skid was present that protected the aircraft's rudder; for short-distance landings, it was supplemented by a brake. The horizontal empennage consisted of a fixed stabilizer, which was positioned on top of the fuselage, and a two-part balanced elevator; the vertical empennage comprised a triangular fin and an unbalanced rudder. The bracing of these parts was achieved via cables.

The aircraft was powered by a single Lorraine-Dietrich 12Eb 12-cylinder W engine, capable of producing up to 450hp, which drove a twin-bladed tractor propeller. The engine bed, which comprised a pair of box girders that were sturdily held in place by a total of six bulkheads, was composed of duralumin. Cooling was achieved via a Lamblin radiator that was attached to the leading edge of the lower wings.

== Operational history ==
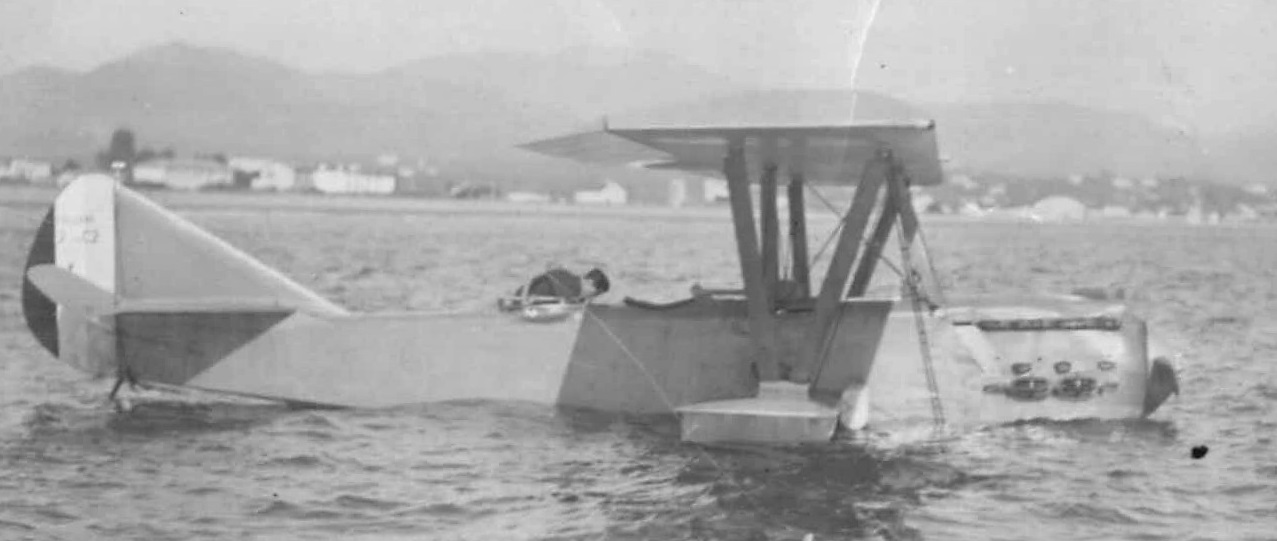
Villiers II after landing on water

The Villiers II entered service with Escadrille 5C1 based at Hyères near Toulon in Southern France in May 1927, with the aircraft never being operated from Béarn. It was replaced by the single-seat Gourdou-Leseurre GL.32, which did not have the same elaborate features for landing on water in September 1928.

== Operators ==
France

- Aéronautique Maritime
  - Escadrille 5C1

== Specifications (Vil 2AMC2 ) ==
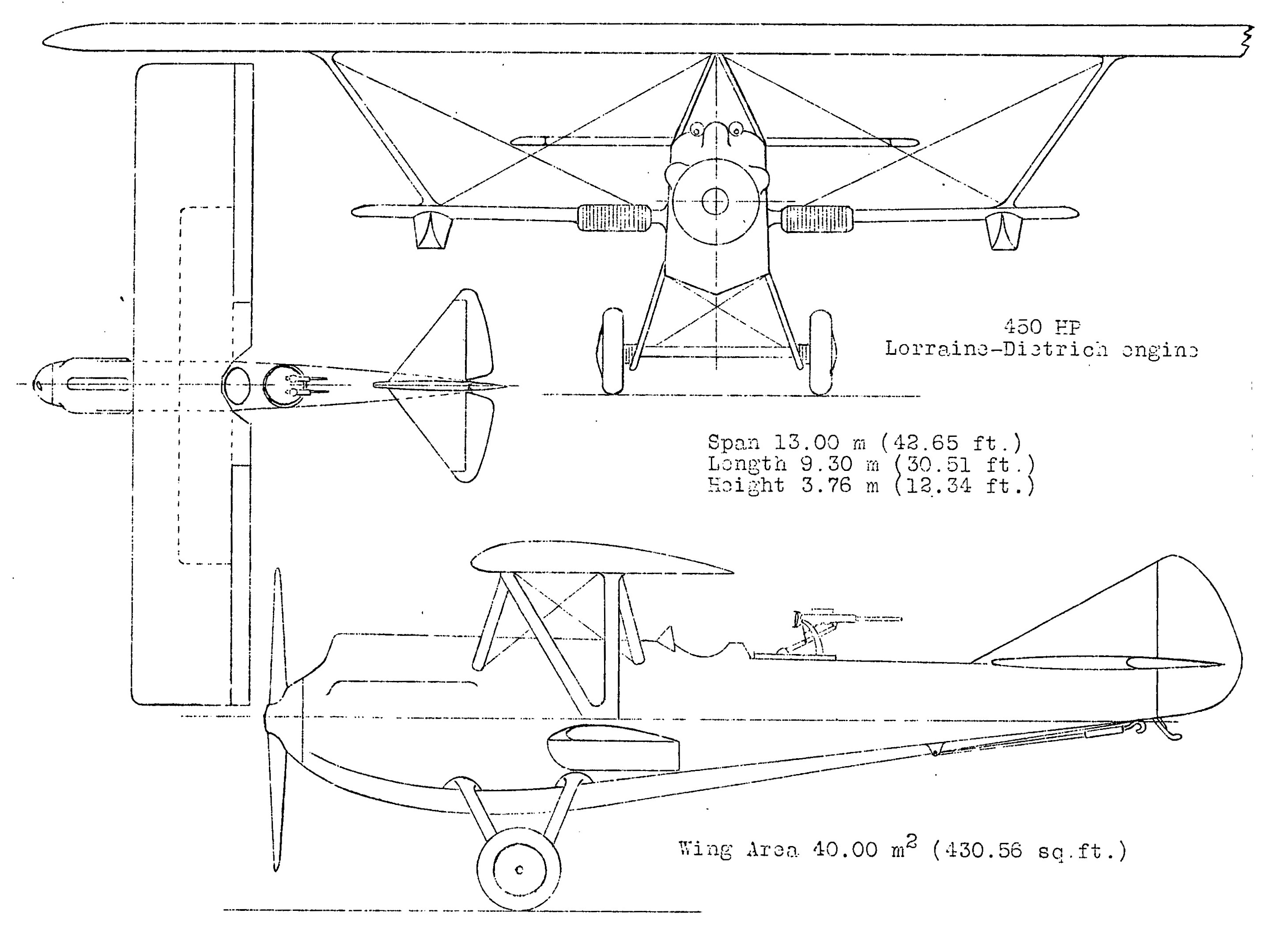
Villiers II 3 view drawing from NACA Aircraft Circular No.37

Data from The Complete Book of Fighters, National Advisory Committee for Aeronautics

General characteristics

- Crew: Two
- Length: 9.50 m (31 ft 2 in)
- Wingspan: 13.00 m (42 ft 8 in)
- Height: 3.96 m (13 ft 0 in)
- Wing area: 40.0 m^{2} (431 sq ft)
- Empty weight: 1,260 kg (2,778 lb)
- Gross weight: 1,900 kg (4,189 lb)
- Powerplant: 1 × Lorraine-Dietrich 12Eb 12-cylinder W engine, 340 kW (450 hp)

Performance

- Maximum speed: 217 km/h (135 mph, 117 kn) at sea level
- Endurance: Three hours
- Service ceiling: 6,250 m (20,510 ft)
- Time to altitude: 28 minutes to 6,000 m (20,000 ft)

Armament

- Guns:
  - 2× fixed, forward firing synchronised 7.7 mm (0.303 in) Vickers guns
  - 2× flexibly mounted Lewis guns in rear cockpit

== See also ==
Aircraft of comparable role, configuration, and era

- Levasseur PL.5
