= Clerget aircraft engines =

French aircraft engine series overview article

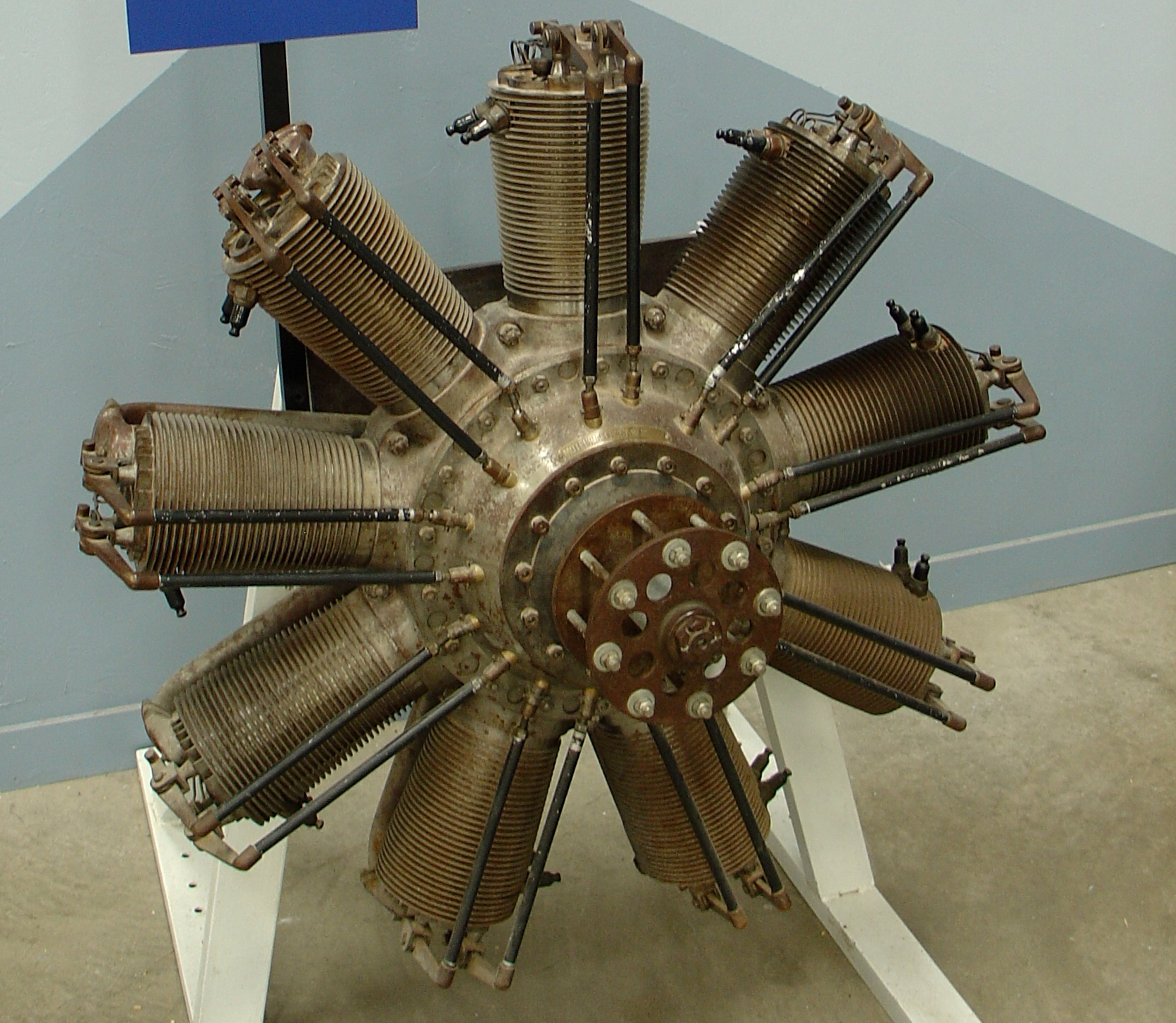
Preserved Clerget 9B rotary engine on display at the Pima Air & Space Museum

Clerget is the name given to aircraft engines designed by the French engineer Pierre Clerget(fr) in the first half of the 20th century.

From 1910 to 1913 a series of, Clerget badged, inline-four and V8 aero-engines were manufactured and marketed by the Clément-Bayard automobile firm.

From 1912, Pierre Clerget focused his efforts on developing a series of rotary aircraft engines and founded a new company, Clerget-Blin in 1913. During World War I, more than 30,000 Clerget rotary engines were manufactured in France and the United Kingdom with the type powering many aircraft including the majority of Sopwith Camels.

Following the bankruptcy and liquidation of Clerget-Blin in 1920, Pierre Clerget joined the Service Technique de l'Aéronautique (STAé) where he specialised in the design of aircraft diesel engines up until his death in 1943.

== The first Clerget engine designs ==
In 1895, at the age of 20, Pierre Clerget graduated with a diploma in mechanical engineering after attending evening classes that he began in 1892. During this period, he also maintained a small workshop within a larger engineering facility owned by his father. From 1895 to 1908, Clerget was primarily engaged with the design of engines for automobiles, buses, and trucks for a variety of customers in his native Dijon and in Paris. In 1901 he designed a relatively successful 50 hp (37 kW) inline four-cylinder engine, some of which were sold to airship pioneers. In late 1905, a Clerget-designed four-cylinder 16 hp (12 kW) engine was fitted to a small advertising airship manufactured by the Zodiac company for the newspaper Le Petit Journal.

From 1908 onwards, Clerget began focusing exclusively on the development of engines for heavier-than-air flight. His first aircraft engine was a 50 hp (37 kW) water-cooled four-cylinder inline that ran at 1,800 rpm, with a reduction gearbox lowering the propeller speed to 1,000 rpm. The engine was unusual for its time as it was supercharged using a vane pump. It was fitted to a Wright biplane but failed to become airborne because both the gearbox and the vane pump broke. In June 1908, Clerget joined the firm of Clément-Bayard, where he built several prototype engines of various layouts including a seven-cylinder water-cooled radial.

== Early Clerget aero engines (inline-four and V8) ==
The first Clerget aero engine to enter series production was the 50 hp model introduced in 1910. It was a water-cooled inline-four engine that produced 50 hp (37 kW) when cold and approximately 40 hp (30 kW) when running at full operating temperature. The engine had aluminum pistons which contributed to its low weight of 73 kg (161 lb). Cylinders were made of steel with water-jackets shaped to form expansion bellows and electroplated with copper. On each of the four cylinders, the pushrod operating the inlet valve was fitted inside a hollow tubular rod which operated the exhaust valve. The engine was used on several pioneering aircraft including the Coandă-1910 and the first Etrich Taube. Clerget also designed a similar, larger inline-four engine that produced 100 hp (75 kW). Both these engines were manufactured by Clément-Bayard.

In October 1910, at the Paris Air Show, Clément-Bayard showcased a powerful Clerget water cooled V8 aircraft engine rated at 200 hp (150 kW). Each cylinder bank was of a similar design to Clerget's earlier inline-four models. The engine weighed 290 kg (640 lb) which gave a power to weight ratio of 0.515 kW/kg (0.313 hp/lb), considered remarkable for its time period. The engine featured a form of variable valve timing, utilising a camshaft that could be adjusted axially to engage different cam profiles. This allowed the opening period of the intake and exhaust valves to be optimised during flight. In 1912, a single 200 hp Clerget engine was fitted to the giant Voisin Icare Aero-Yacht.

=== Early Clerget engine types ===
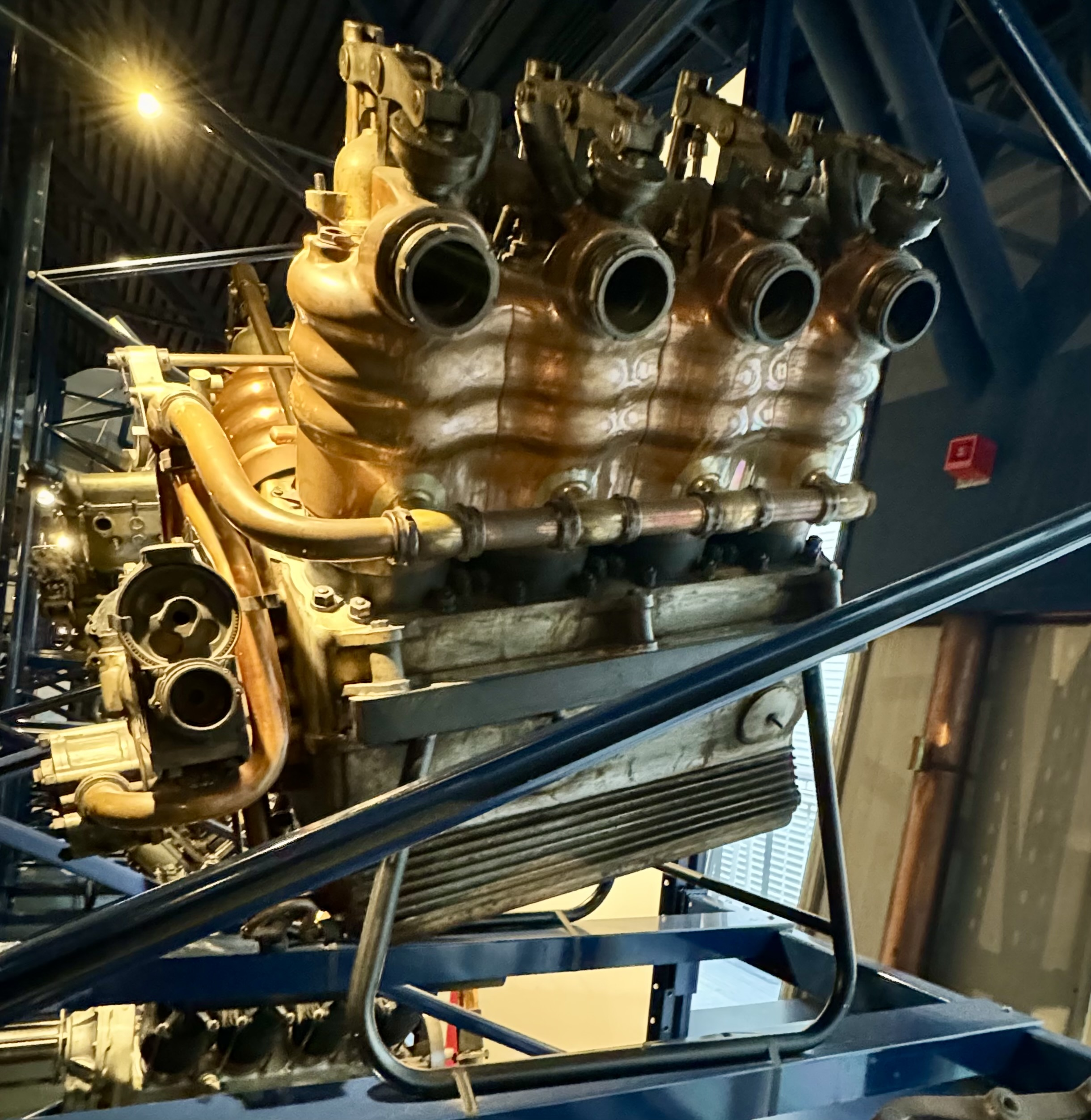
200 hp Clerget aircraft engine displayed at the London Science Museum

Clerget 50 hp (4V)
(1910) 50 hp (37 kW), 4.56 L (278 cu in), inline-four
Clerget 100 hp (4W)
(1910) 100 hp (75 kW), 9.85 L (601 cu in), inline-four
Clerget 200 hp
(1910) 200 hp (150 kW), 19.7 L (1,200 cu in), V8

=== Early Clerget engines on display ===
- A 50 hp Clerget engine is displayed at the Vienna Museum of Science and Technology.
- A 200 hp Clerget engine is displayed at the London Science Museum.

== Rotary engine development (spark ignition) ==
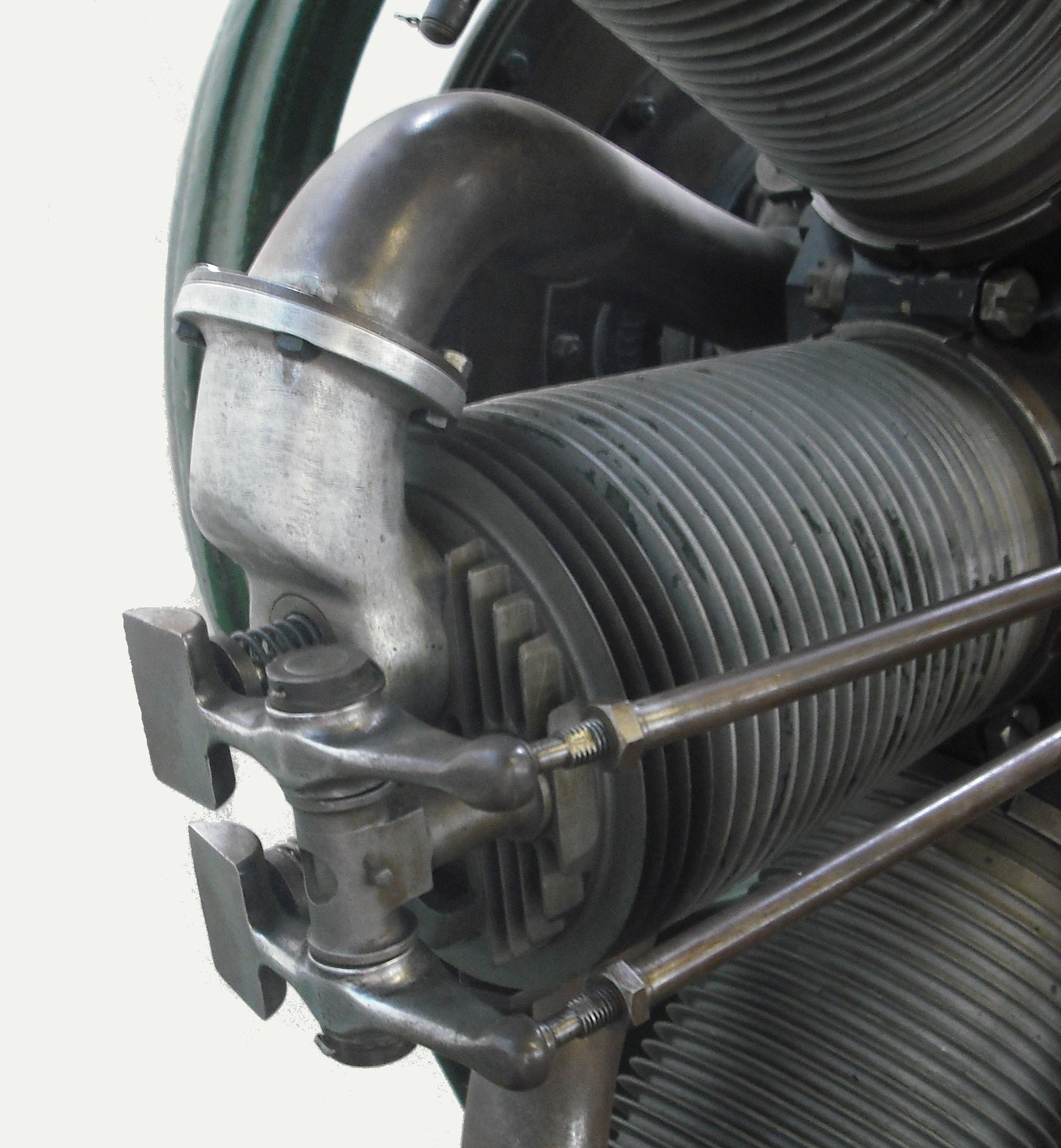
Cylinder head of a Clerget 9J, showing the two valve rockers and the induction pipe from the rear of the engine

Beginning in 1911, Clerget's engines were built under an agreement with the firm Malicet et Blin with manufacturing outsourced to Clément-Bayard. From 1912, Pierre Clerget devoted himself to the design of rotary engines. Clerget's designs were successful, initially with the sports aircraft market and then with military customers. In 1913, Pierre Clerget founded a new company, Clerget-Blin with the industrialist Eugène Blin. More than 30,000 Clerget rotary engine were built during World War I with many of these being built under licence in the United Kingdom by several firms, including Gwynnes and Ruston-Proctor. During World War I, Clerget rotary engines were fitted to a large number of aircraft types and powered the majority of Sopwith Camel fighter aircraft flown by the Royal Flying Corps.

=== Design features ===
The Clerget rotary engines were air-cooled with either seven, nine or eleven cylinders. They were fitted with a double thrust ball race, which enabled them to be used either as a pusher or as a tractor engine.

The engines worked on a four-stroke cycle. The chief point of difference from most other rotary engines was that the inlet and exhaust valves were mechanically operated by means of separate cams, tappets and rocker arms.

A source of failure among the Clerget engines were the special-purpose piston rings, called obturator rings. These were located below the gudgeon or wrist pin, to block heat transfer from the combustion area to the lower part of the cylinder and overcome their subsequent distortion. These rings were often made from brass and only had a lifespan of a few hours. The Bentley BR1 and Bentley BR2 rotaries were designed as improvements of the Clerget, while sharing some of the earlier engine's distinctive design features they had conventional piston rings and cylinder liners.

=== Rotary engine types ===
Clerget 7Y
(1912) 60 hp (45 kW), seven-cylinder. Powered Pommery Cup(fr) winning aircraft in 1913. Model is also known as the 60 hp Clerget.
Clerget 7Z
(1913) 80 hp (60 kW), seven-cylinder.
Clerget 9A
(1913) 110 hp (82 kW), nine-cylinder derivative of 7Z. (designation reused for radial)
Clerget 9B
(1915) 130 hp (97 kW), nine-cylinder. (designation reused for radial). Most numerous of the Clerget engines with 6,500 built in France and 5,200 manufactured, under licence, in the United Kingdom.
Clerget 9Bf
(1917) 140 hp (100 kW), nine-cylinder long stroke version of the Clerget 9B. 2,350 engines built with all production taking place in the United Kingdom.
Clerget 9Z
(1915) 110 hp (82 kW), nine-cylinder.
Clerget 11Eb
(1918) 200 hp (150 kW), 11-cylinder, single-row engine.
Clerget 9J
(1918) 110 hp (82 kW), nine-cylinder. Postwar development aimed at the light aircraft market. Redesigned with aluminium pistons, tubular connecting rods and revised valve gear.

=== Rotary engines on display ===
- A locally-built Clerget 9B of 1917 is displayed at the Museum of Lincolnshire Life.
- A preserved Clerget 9B engine is on public display at the Fleet Air Arm Museum, RNAS Yeovilton.

=== Operational rotary engines ===
The Shuttleworth Collection based at Old Warden Aerodrome in the UK, operate an airworthy late production Sopwith Triplane (G-BOCK) fitted with an original 9B as well as an airworthy late production Sopwith Camel (G-BZSC) fitted with an original long-stroke 9Bf. These aircraft can be seen displaying at home air displays through the summer months.

== X16 engine ==
Clerget 16X

An experimental 420 hp (310 kW) 16-cylinder, four-row X engine.

== Flat-twin engine ==
The last Clerget designed spark-ignition engine to see service in an aircraft was a 15 hp (11 kW) flat-twin engine which weighed only 25 kg (55 lb). The engine was fitted to a Dewoitine D.7, piloted by Georges Barbot(it), which was entered into a 1923 competition created by the French newspaper Le Matin for a French built aircraft to make a return trip across the English Channel with an engine of less than 1.5 L (92 cu in). The aircraft successfully completed the challenge, covering 120 km (75 mi) while consuming only 9 L (2.4 US gal) of gasoline.

Clerget's flat-twin engines were marketed as the 2K when fitted with aluminium cylinder heads and as the 2L if fitted with heads made of Alpax (a lightweight high-silicon aluminium alloy).

== Diesel radial engines ==
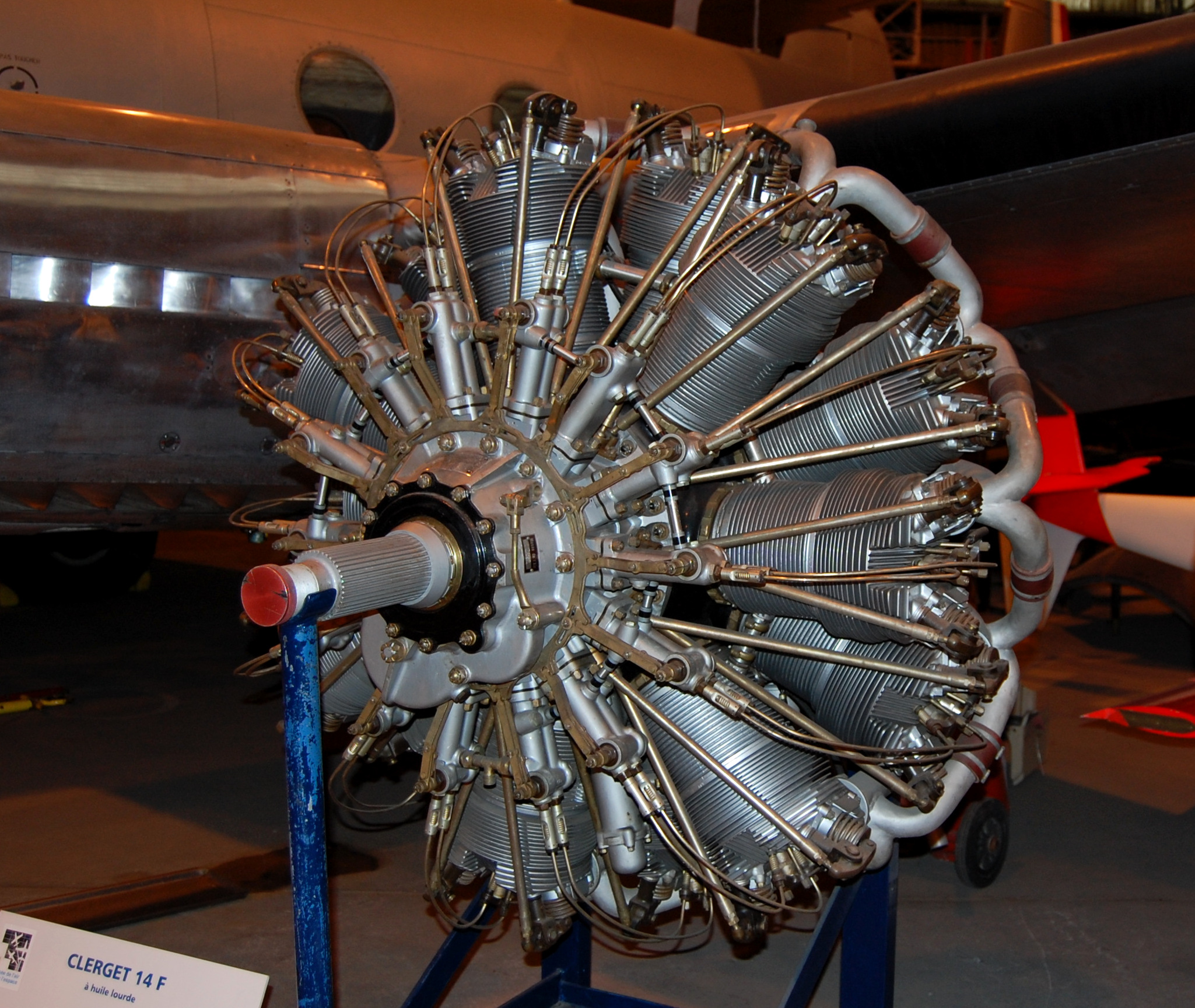
A Clerget 14F diesel aircraft engine preserved at the Conservatoire de l'Air et de l'Espace d’Aquitaine

Following the bankruptcy and liquidation of Clerget-Blin in 1920, Pierre Clerget joined the Service Technique de l'Aéronautique (STAé) as an engineer and remained there up until his death in 1943. During this period, Clerget primarily specialised in the study of aircraft diesel engines, particularly radial designs.

=== Diesel radial engine types ===
Clerget 9A
(1929) 100 hp (75 kW) nine-cylinder, single row radial engine.
Clerget 9B
(1930) 200 hp (150 kW) nine-cylinder, single row radial engine.
Clerget 9C
(1932) 300 hp (220 kW) nine-cylinder, single row radial engine. Produced under licence by Hispano-Suiza as the Hispano-Suiza 9T
Clerget 14D
(1933) 300 hp (220 kW) 14-cylinder, twin-row radial engine.
Clerget 14E
(1934) 400 hp (300 kW) 14-cylinder, twin-row radial engine, flown in a Potez 25 biplane.
Clerget 14F
(1934) 520 hp (390 kW) 14-cylinder, twin-row radial engine, licensed to Hispano-Suiza and Panhard.

== V16 diesel engine ==
Clerget's final engine design was a V-16 diesel engine designated as the Clerget 16H and known as the Type Transatlantique. It was projected to develop 2,000 hp (1,500 kW) through the use of four Rateau turbochargers. Development of the engine ended with outbreak of World War II and the subsequent occupation of France.

== See also ==
- List of aircraft engines
