= Dewoitine D.26 =

Trainer aircraft

D.26
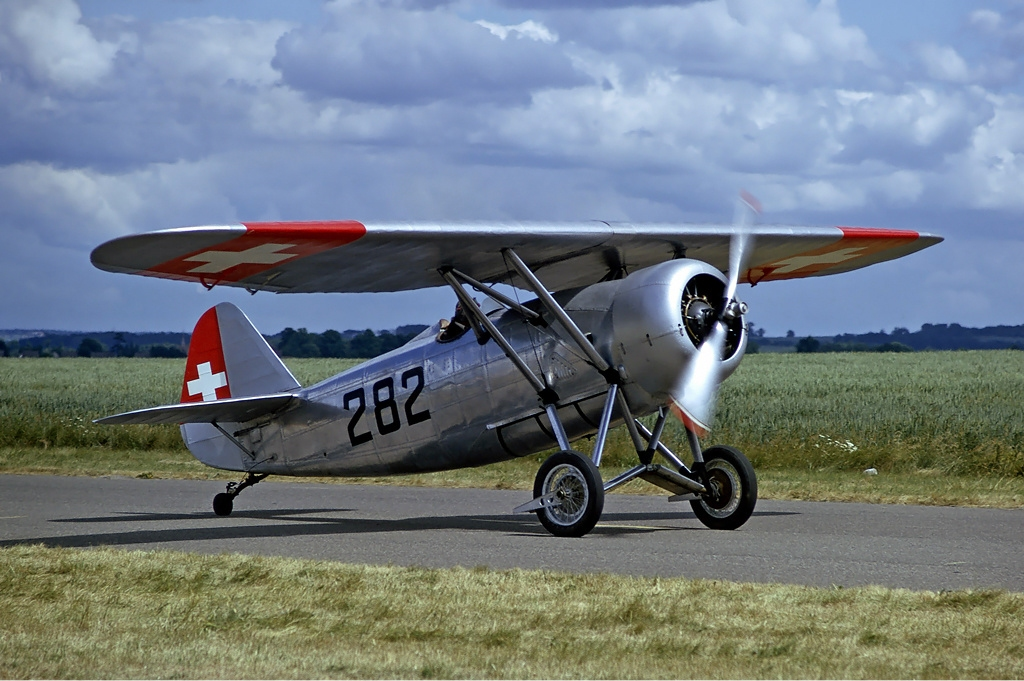
- D.26 at Duxford in 1975

General information
- Type: Trainer
- Manufacturer: Dewoitine
- Primary user: Swiss Air Force
- Number built: 11

History
- First flight: December 1929

The Dewoitine D.26 was a military trainer developed in France for the Swiss Air Force in parallel with the D.27 fighter.

== Design and development ==
The D.26 airframe was similar to that of the D.27. Differences included:

- The engine cowling was omitted on the D.26;
- The D.26 radial engine was smaller and produced 340 hp power;

== Operational history ==
Dewoitine built 10 examples for assembly by the Swiss factory K+W Thun in Switzerland. These were followed by an order for two more aircraft equipped with a slightly higher-powered version of the Wright 9Q engine that powered the initial batch, and one of the original D.26s was similarly re-engined. The original D.26s were used principally for training in gunnery and formation flying, while the more powerful aircraft were used for air-to-air combat training. To this end, they were equipped with gun cameras.

The D.26 enjoyed a long service life, not being withdrawn until 1948. At this time, they were transferred to the Aero-Club der Schweiz where they were used as glider tugs. The last example was not retired from aeroclub use until 1970, whereupon it was preserved at the military aviation museum at Dübendorf.

Only two planes are still airworthy in original condition. Number 286 is based in Grenchen LSZG and number 284 is based in Lausanne LSGL. Both planes tour in air shows as "Patrouille Dewoitine - Swiss Air Force 1931".

== Operators ==
Switzerland

- Swiss Air Force

== Specifications ==
General characteristics

- Crew: 1, pilot
- Length: 6.72 m (22 ft 1 in)
- Wingspan: 10.30 m (33 ft 10 in)
- Height: 2.78 m (9 ft 1 in)
- Wing area: 17.6 m^{2} (189 sq ft)
- Empty weight: 763 kg (1,682 lb)
- Gross weight: 1,068 kg (2,354 lb)
- Powerplant: 1 × Wright 9Qa (R-975) radial engine , 250 kW (340 hp)

Performance

- Maximum speed: 240 km/h (150 mph, 130 kn)
- Range: 500 km (310 mi, 270 nmi)
- Service ceiling: 7,500 m (24,600 ft)

Armament

- 2 machine guns 7.5mm with 500 rounds each
