= Cañete Pirata =

Pirata

General information
- Type: Reconnaissance and bomber aircraft
- National origin: Spain
- Designer: Captain of Engineers Antonio Cañete Heredia
- Number built: 1

History
- First flight: 17 August 1927

The Cañete Pirata, also known as Hidro Antonio Cañete de Reconocimiento (HACR), was a Spanish military parasol wing, single-engined flying boat flown in the late 1920s. Only one was built.

== Design and development ==
The Pirata was designed by Antonio Cañete and built in the workshops of the Spanish military base of Mar Chica at Melilla on the North African coast, construction starting in 1926. As Spain had no manufacturer of light alloys, Cañete was forced to use galvanised iron in its structure.

Its parasol wing was in three parts, with a 2 m (6 ft 7 in) span centre section and two 8 m (26 ft 3 in) outer panels. In plan, the complete wing was straight tapered with squared-off tips and had a thick section with a thickness-chord ratio of 16%. Its wooden structure was built around twin spars with ash flanges and pine webs and the wing was covered with 1.0 mm (0.039 in) plywood ahead and behind the spars and 1.5 mm (0.059 in) ply between them. A pair of parallel struts from the upper fuselage supported the wing spars at about mid-span. Ailerons spanned most of the outer panel's trailing edges.

The Pirata was powered by a 340 kW (450 hp) water-cooled Lorraine 12E Courlis W12 engine, with a choice between direct or geared-down drive, mounted in the wing centre section. Its oil tank, with radiators on its outer wall, was under the engine cowling between the spars but its two fuel tanks, each holding 600 L (130 imp gal; 160 US gal), were in the fuselage.

The Pirata's hull had a single-step planing bottom and flat sides, built around galvanised-iron frames and covered with corrugated metal sheet thicker ahead of the step than behind. It was divided internally into five watertight compartments and stabilized on the water by a pair of 3.0 m (9 ft 10 in) long, unstepped floats placed 2.50 m (8 ft 2 in) apart. Each was mounted on a pair of struts from the top of the wing struts and another pair of struts from the upper fuselage.

It had a crew of four in open cockpits. There was a gunner's position in the nose, equipped with a pair of Darne machine guns on a flexible mounting, with access to a hold containing 200 kg (440 lb) of bombs. Pilot and flight engineer sat side by side in a second cockpit under the wing leading edge, from which the interior compartment of the hull holding the fuel tanks could be accessed via watertight doors. A dorsal gunner's post, similarly equipped to that in the nose, was under the trailing edge with a bomb store below.

The Pirata's triangular profile fin was an integral part of the fuselage and carried a comma-shaped, balanced rudder. Its angular tailplane, mounted on the fin and braced from below on V-struts to the lower hull, carried split, balanced elevators. The fixed tail surfaces were, like the wing, wood-framed and ply-covered, but the control surfaces were steel-tube framed and fabric-covered.

The Pirata flew for the first time on 17 August 1927. By September 1929, it had made many flights. Tests had shown that its handling was good and that performance was significantly improved when the engine was geared-down. Very little is known of its later history: there is no evidence of production and in Spain it would have been in competition with the Dornier Wal, which was being built locally from 1927.

== Specifications ==
Data from Les Ailes, September 1929

General characteristics

- Crew: Four
- Length: 13.40 m (44 ft 0 in)
- Wingspan: 18 m (59 ft 1 in)
- Height: 3.60 m (11 ft 10 in)
- Wing area: 54 m^{2} (580 sq ft)
- Empty weight: 1,900 kg (4,189 lb) equipped
- Gross weight: 3,000 kg (6,614 lb)
- Fuel capacity: 1,200 L (320 US gal; 260 imp gal)
- Powerplant: 1 × Lorraine 12E Courlis water-cooled W-12, 340 kW (450 hp)
- Propellers: 2-bladed

Performance

- Maximum speed: 190 km/h (120 mph, 100 kn) at ground level
- Cruise speed: 170 km/h (110 mph, 92 kn)
- Stall speed: 80 km/h (50 mph, 43 kn) minimum speed at ground level
- Range: 1,000 km (620 mi, 540 nmi)
- Service ceiling: 4,500 m (14,800 ft)
- Time to altitude: 11 min to 2,000 m (6,600 ft)
- Take-off time: 38 s

Armament

- Guns: pairs of flexibly mounted Darne machine guns in nose and dorsal cockpits.
- Bombs: 40 × 11 kg (24 lb) bombs
