= Aero-Club der Schweiz =

Switzerland's national aero club

The Aero-Club der Schweiz is Switzerland's national aero club, based in Luzern. It claims an active membership of 21,000, amongst some 350 local groups. The club commissioned the Ultimate EA230 aerobatics plane from Walter Extra.
