= Dewoitine D.28 =

D.28

General information
- Type: Airliner
- Manufacturer: Société Aéronautique Française-Avions Dewoitine
- Number built: 2

History
- First flight: April 1931

The Dewoitine D.28 was a French high-wing monoplane airliner built in the early 1930s, with a single nose-mounted engine.

== Specifications ==
Data from

General characteristics

- Crew: 1
- Capacity: 6 pax
- Length: 13.10 m (43 ft 0 in)
- Wingspan: 19.68 m (64 ft 7 in)
- Wing area: 45 m^{2} (480 sq ft)
- Empty weight: 1,859 kg (4,098 lb)
- Gross weight: 3,415 kg (7,529 lb)
- Powerplant: 1 × Renault 12Jb V-12 water-cooled piston engine, 370 kW (500 hp)

Performance

- Maximum speed: 210 km/h (130 mph, 110 kn)
- Service ceiling: 4,000 m (13,000 ft)
