= Ansaldi (surname) =

Ansaldi is an Italian surname. Notable people with the surname include:

- Casto Innocenzio Ansaldi (1710–1780), Italian professor, theologian and archaeologist
- Connie Ansaldi (born 1973), Argentine TV host
- Cristian Ansaldi (born 1986), Argentine footballer
- Giovanni Andrea Ansaldi (1584–1630), Italian painter
- Innocenzio Ansaldi (1734–1816), Italian painter and writer
- Marilena Ansaldi (1934–2021), Brazilian ballet dancer, choreographer and actress
- Michele Ansaldi, Italian automobile engineer, designer, and industrialist

== See also ==
- Ansaldo (disambiguation)
