= FS Class E.454 =

Series of Italian electric locomotives

FS E.453 / E.454
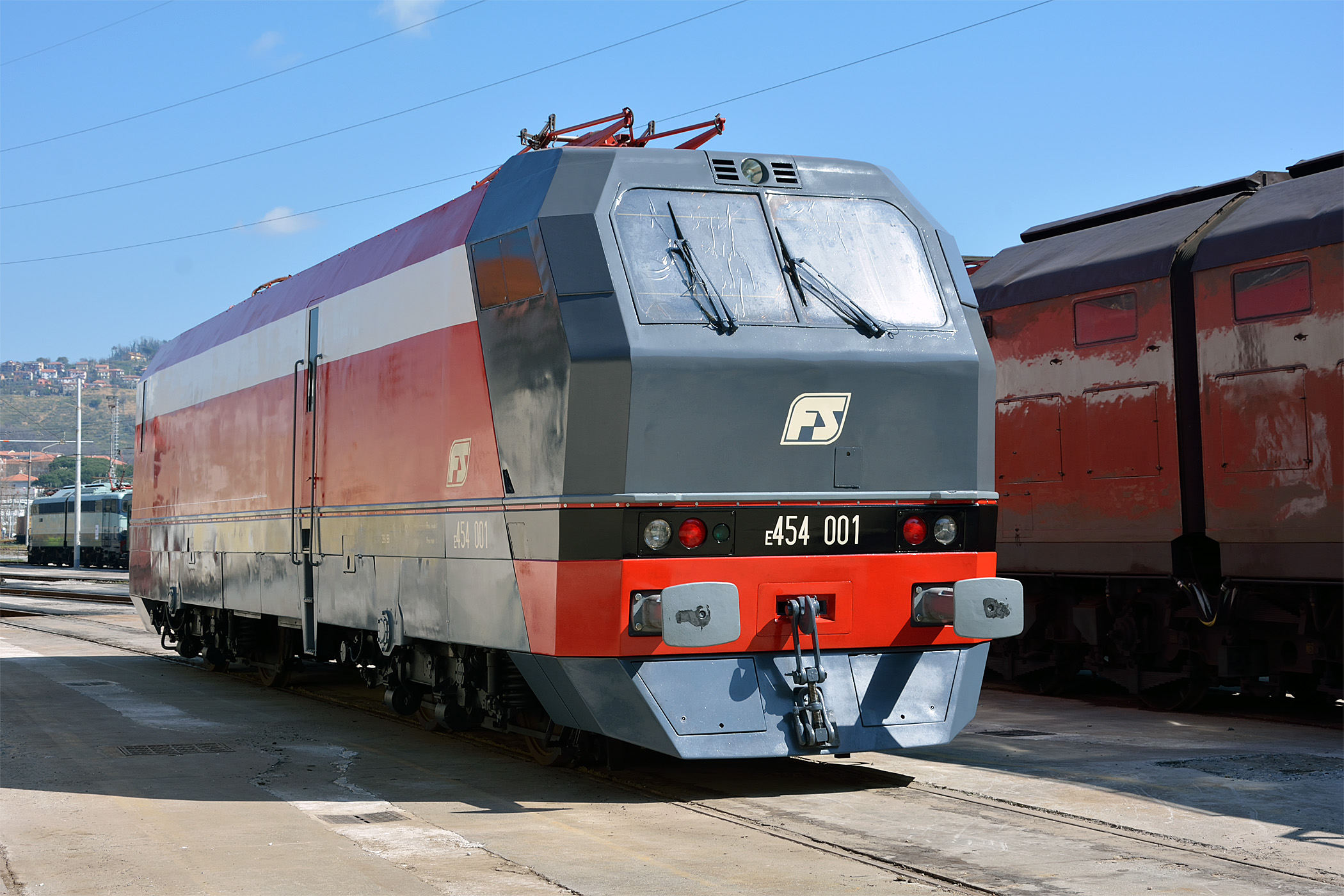
- Locomotive E.454.001, restored as a historical vehicle
Type and origin
- Builder: Breda Costruzioni Ferroviarie, Ansaldo, Fiat Ferroviaria, ABB Tecnomasio
- Build date: 1985–1989
Specifications
- Configuration
  - UIC: Bo'Bo'
- Trucks: 2
- Wheel diameter: 1,250 mm
- Wheelbase: 8,500 mm (between trucks); 2,800 mm (truck wheelbase)
- Length: 16,500 millimetres (650 in)
- Electric system/s: 3 kV DC
- Gear ratio: E.454: 36/96; E.453: 31/96
Performance figures
- Power output: 3,900 kilowatts (5,200 hp) (maximum); 3,600 kW (continuous, UIC)
- Tractive effort: 221 kilonewtons (50,000 lb_{f}) (maximum)

The E.454 locomotives are a small series of electric locomotives with electronic control, single-cab, and remote-controllable, designed and built for the Italian State Railways in the 1980s. A freight version, named E.453, was also developed. Remaining at the prototype stage, they were phased out during the 1990s.

== History ==
=== Background ===
The E.453 and E.454 locomotive groups represent one of the renewal projects for the rolling stock fleet of the Italian State Railways, initiated between the late 1970s and the mid-1980s of the 20th century... They also served as a testbed for various innovative solutions from the Italian railway industry and, at least conceptually, were the predecessors of the E.464. On September 27, 1984, with funds from the Programma integrativo trasporti, the FS ordered five vehicles with the following general characteristics: a single cab, two trucks with one motor per axle, and a total mass of approximately 80 t. The order was split into three locomotives with a gear ratio designed to reach 160 km/h (designated E.454) and two with a shorter gear ratio, intended to be coupled together to form a single high-power traction unit for heavy freight trains, capable of reaching 120 km/h, designated E.453

The design and construction involved a consortium of highly qualified companies, including ABB Tecnomasio for power and control electronics, Ansaldo Trasporti for traction motors and diagnostics, Breda Costruzioni Ferroviarie for the body, pneumatic systems, and mechanical components, and Fiat Ferroviaria for trucks and transmissions.

=== Construction and delivery ===
The aesthetic design was entrusted to the Pininfarina studio, which proposed a distinctive, angular, and sleek look, characterized by a gray front separated from the rest of the body by a sharp diagonal line. A bright red livery with gray accents was chosen, a highly innovative aesthetic for the time, replacing the initial plan for a front based on the aerodynamic head of the MDVC semi-pilot coaches. After extensive testing, particularly of the power electronics by ABB and ancillary components, in June 1989, the E.454.001 left the Sofer company factory in Naples and was temporarily assigned to the Naples Smistamento locomotive depot for testing and trials under live overhead lines. The planned delivery of the various units, assigned to the Pistoia locomotive depot, followed this order: E.454.002, 453.001, 453.002, and finally E.454.003.

The E.454.002 was delivered on August 5, 1989 (but officially registered by FS in May 1990). In early 1990, Sofer delivered the first E.453, the 001, which arrived in Pistoia on March 29 of the same year. The E.454.003, the last of the small passenger series, was delivered on July 28, 1990; still under commissioning at the Pistoia depot, it had to donate its trucks to the already operational 454.001, which had suffered severe motor damage due to an erroneous maneuver at the same facility. The first pilot coach suitable for remote control of the locomotives, adapted by Sofer, was delivered on September 18, 1990.

=== Pre-service ===
From February 1, 1990, the E.454.001, and shortly thereafter the 454.002, were gradually introduced at the head of trains with uniform compositions of MDVC or MDVE coaches, initially accompanied by a different locomotive, then with locomotives positioned at both ends to ensure train reversibility without maneuvers (while simultaneously testing their efficiency) on the Pistoia, Lucca, Pisa, Florence, Pistoia route. During the summer period between June and July, the 454.001 was sent to Savigliano for a series of tests, after which it returned to Pistoia. No significant issues were reported with the locomotives over the long term, except for their inability to be remotely controlled except with specifically equipped coaches.

On some occasions, the two E.453s were also tested, coupled together with a single control, yielding good results in terms of operation. On November 9, 1990, on the Florence-Bologna high-speed line, the 453.001 effortlessly hauled a 1,050 t freight train and conducted various dynamometric tests in the following days, returning to its Pistoia depot afterward; however, there was no real application for freight train traction, as FS had shifted its focus, abandoning the modular traction unit project in favor of building around a hundred E.652 locomotives, whose hourly power was just over 25% lower than the combined power of the two 453s.

=== Regular service ===
The two E.454s entered regular service at the start of the 1990 summer timetable, alternating with the E.646 shuttle locomotives for train operations. In August, the two locomotives operated passenger trains on the Florence-Livorno line and then on the Arezzo-Pistoia route. In September, the first modified pilot coach for serial remote control via a 13-pin line also entered service.

The various locomotives alternated at the head of trains in the Florence-Pistoia area, using both E.453 and E.454 units interchangeably during 1990–1991.

During their use, the locomotives were subject to experimentation: the 454.002 was equipped with new-type trucks and motors for testing purposes, but in 1997, it was restored to its original configuration due to a lack of available spare parts. Meanwhile, the two E.453s were withdrawn from service to provide spare parts for the three E.454s. In passenger service, on various routes originating from Florence, the 454.001 and 003 were primarily used for direct or interregional trains. On February 24 and 25, 1999, the E.454.001 was used in Florence for a series of dynamic and functional tests of the ATR 90 pantograph.

=== Withdrawal and end of the group ===
The slow progress of the project, partly due to changing political and economic priorities, rendered it obsolete as new technologies were soon developed (leading to the development of the E.412 and E.464, both with three-phase inverter control). Additionally, no system using a 78-pin line was installed: this, along with the small size of the group and maintenance difficulties, contributed to the premature withdrawal of the group.

The locomotives operated relatively regularly until the second half of the 1990s, then were gradually phased out, starting with the two E.453s—used as sources of spare parts—followed by the E.454s. The E.453 group was completely phased out in 2004 at the Fervet plant (later Corifer) in Castelfranco Veneto with the demolition of unit 001, which had been stored at the Bologna Centrale Locomotive Depot until December 2003. The "sister" E.454s were also demolished, except for the 001, stored in Empoli, made available to the University of Florence for experimental studies. This prototype is located at the workshops of the former La Spezia Migliarina Locomotive Depot, home of the Liguria Historical Trains Association, which oversaw its external aesthetic restoration.

=== Preserved unit ===
On October 7, 2014, the FS Italiane Foundation recovered the E.454.001, the last surviving unit, which had been stored at Empoli station for about 20 years. The locomotive was transferred to Santo Stefano di Magra pending restoration. In February 2016, the E.454.001 emerged from the restoration workshop and was publicly displayed on March 20 at the Open Day of the La Spezia Migliarina locomotive depot. The locomotive's recovery was limited to aesthetic restoration only.

== Design ==
The most distinctive feature of the locomotives is their single cab, which was almost a novelty for Italian railways. Full remote control of the locomotive was provided, either from another similar coupled locomotive or from a dedicated pilot coach. To this end, a 13-pin electrical line with serial control logic was used, achieved by installing a German-derived ZMS system.

Two maximum speeds were planned for the locomotives based on their intended service: 160 km/h for the passenger version (E.454) and 120 km/h for the freight version (E.453). The hourly power was the same at 3,900 kW. The freight version, with a "short" gear ratio of 31/96, was intended to use two coupled locomotives with flat ends connected by a gangway connection, forming a traction unit with nearly 8 MW of power. For the E.454, a gear ratio of 36/96 was planned.

The electrical and mechanical equipment was designed to be as standardized and modular as possible, allowing easy replacement and interchangeability with other locomotives under development or recently introduced at the time. The trucks and electric traction motors were identical to those of the E.491 single-phase locomotives; the regulation and diagnostic components, as well as the rheostatic braking system, were also the same. Similar components were planned for the E.402.

=== Mechanical components ===
==== Body ====
The body, designed by Breda Costruzioni Ferroviarie and built by Sofer, introduced several innovations compared to earlier locomotives. The overall structure is made of welded steel, but the fairings are largely made of fiberglass, including the front plow. The cab access doors, positioned near the center of the body on both sides, are a novel feature, aimed at strengthening the cab against potential frontal impacts. The partition between the cab and the equipment compartment is also made of fiberglass, serving as a soundproof wall while incorporating lockers for personal use and signal repetition equipment. The front buffers, of the "Jarret" shock-absorbing type, are entirely new. The railway coupling on the front crossbeam is of the traditional type. Large hatches on the roof allow the power modules to be extracted from above.

A notable difference between the two versions is the presence of retractable rearview mirrors on the E.454, absent on the E.453. The livery, while maintaining the same red and gray base colors, differs slightly; the passenger version features a horizontal white stripe at the level of the ventilation grilles. The ventilation grilles also differ: larger on E.454.001 and 003, longer and thinner on E.454.002 and the two E.453s.

==== Trucks ====
The locomotives had two trucks, designed by Fiat Ferroviaria, identical to those of the E.491, with a design focused on maximum accessibility for maintenance or repairs. The motor, reducer, and wheelset assembly was designed to be fully accessible from below and removable without lifting the body or disassembling the corresponding truck.

The E.454.002 was temporarily fitted with a new type of truck for testing between 1996 and 1997. It was later restored to its original configuration.

==== Cab ====
The locomotives were equipped with a single front cab, housing the unified FS control desk with instrumentation and levers for electric/pneumatic and adjustable braking. The rear end was designed and built flat, equipped with an intercommunication gangway; internally, on the sides, a minimal control desk was installed for movements and shunting, equipped only with adjustable braking. It was not suitable for train operation except in the forward direction. In the absence of a pilot coach, a turntable would have been needed to reposition the locomotive in the correct direction.

=== Electrical components ===
The concept of modularity is extensively applied in the locomotive, with the construction of two power modules containing all necessary components for motor power supply and regulation, including electronic and electromechanical equipment, network filtering systems, and cooling fans. A high-voltage frame includes input and protection circuits, a high-speed circuit breaker, and two forced-ventilation rheostatic brakes mounted in a single structural block.

The general layout placed the two power modules in correspondence with their respective trucks. The high-voltage modules, rheostatic brake, and other equipment are located in the central part of the locomotive, in a compartment between two side corridors.

==== Traction motors ====
The locomotive's traction motors, designed and built by Ansaldo Trasporti, consisted of two per truck, type MTC 743/83 direct current, with series-excited fields, connected in series within each truck. The motor power for each truck was regulated by its own fixed-frequency two-phase chopper; the two traction units operated in parallel with a 180° phase shift.

==== Pantographs ====
The two pantographs were of the 52 FS type, also used on other FS locomotives. In the "freight" version (E.453), high-voltage couplers were also installed on the flat rear ends, positioned high, to connect the pantograph circuits directly in parallel, anticipating (though never implemented) the use of paired locomotives with a single raised pantograph.

At the end of February 1999, the E.454.001 was fitted with new ATR 90 pantographs for testing purposes

== Pilot coach ==
The choice to use the UIC 13-pin line to remotely control the locomotive from the control car posed a challenge, as no units with control panels for serial-controlled equipment were available at the time. It was decided to adapt three units, one for each E.454; the first pilot coach was modified by Sofer, based on a Breda design, with the installation of an ABB Trazione ZMS control logic and delivered on September 18, 1990

== Bibliography ==
- Grassi, Giuseppe (1989). "Nuove locomotive per le FS (Gruppo E.454)" [New locomotives for the FS (E.454 Group)]. I Treni Oggi (96): 14–20.
- Turchi, Gian Guido (1991). "Viaggio sull'E.454" [Journey on the E.454]. I Treni Oggi (120): 14–17.
- "E.454: che pasticcio!" [E.454: what a mess!]. I Treni Oggi (123): 14–17. 1992.
- Cortese, Vittorio Mario (1999). "E.464 alla ribalta" [E.464 in the spotlight]. I Treni (205): 10–19.
- Cornolò, Giovanni (2008). Dall'E.626 all'Eurostar. 1928–2008: ottant'anni di locomotive elettriche FS [From E.626 to Eurostar. 1928-2008: eighty years of FS electric locomotives]. Parma: Ermanno Albertelli. pp. 353–360. ISBN 978-88-87372-63-2.
