= Piacenza cable-stayed bridge =

Bridge in Lombardy and Emilia-Romagna, Italy

Piacenza cable-stayed bridge Ponte strallato di Piacenza
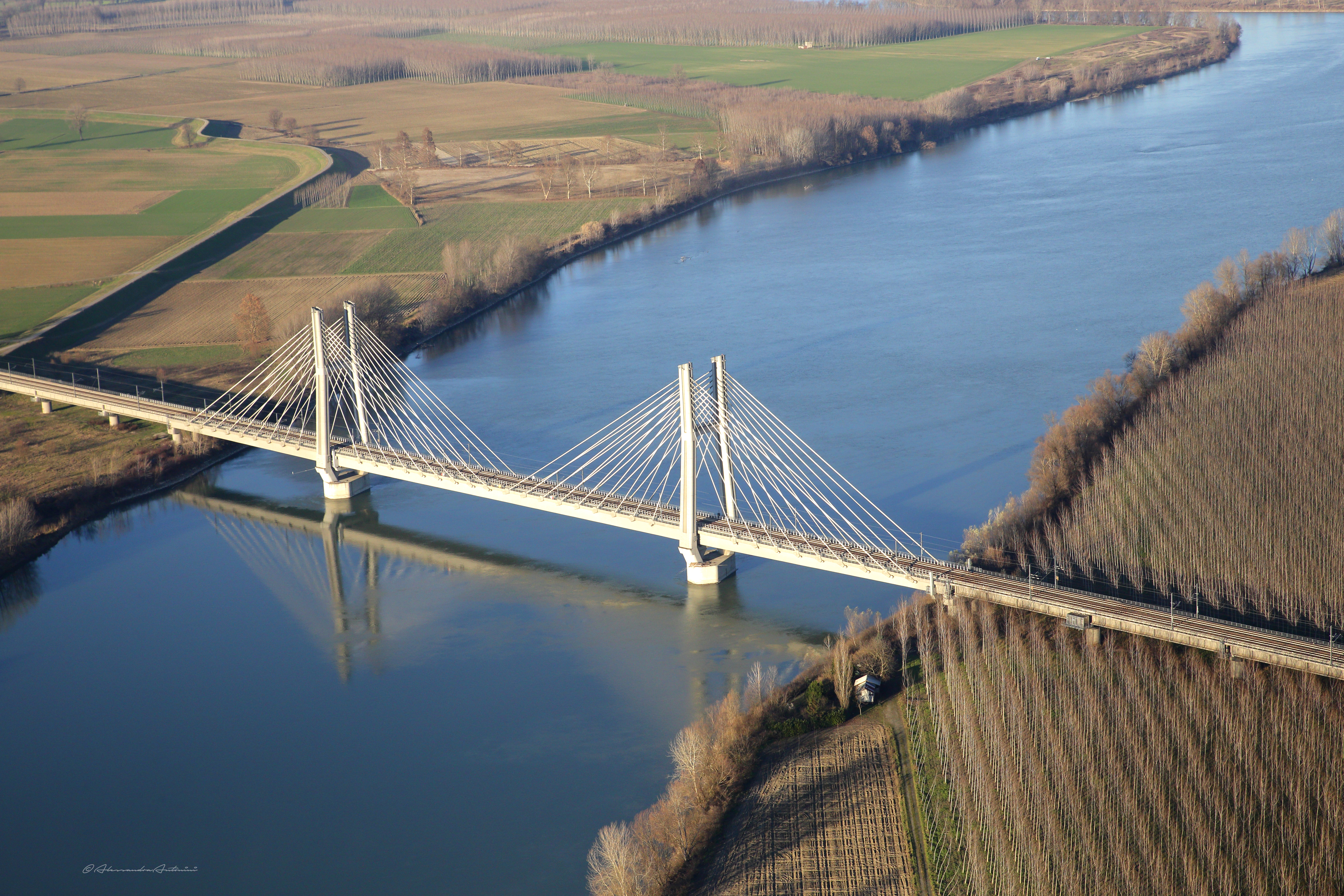
- Coordinates: 45°04′42″N 9°44′44″E
- Carries: Milan–Bologna high-speed railway
- Crosses: Po
- Locale: Piacenza, Emilia-Romagna and San Rocco al Porto, Lombardy, Italy

Characteristics
- Design: Cable-stayed bridge
- Material: Reinforced concrete, steel

History
- Architect: Mario Paolo Petrangeli
- Construction start: 15 July 2002
- Construction end: 9 June 2006
- Construction cost: €43 million
- Opened: 14 December 2008

Location
- Interactive map of Piacenza cable-stayed bridge

The Piacenza cable-stayed bridge (Italian: Ponte strallato di Piacenza) is a railway bridge that allows high-speed rail between Milano-Bologna to cross the river Po.

The structure is located at kilometre marker 44.232 of the Milan-Bologna high-speed line, approximately 1.5 km downstream from the bridge on the Autostrada A1, between the localities of Mezzana Casati, a frazione in the comune of San Rocco al Porto, and Bosco dei Santi, a frazione in the comune of Piacenza.

At the time of its construction, the bridge was the largest cable-stayed railway bridge made of steel and reinforced concrete in the world.

== History ==
Regular circulation on the bridge, as on the rest of the line, began on 14 December 2008, after the inaugural journey from Milan to Bologna had taken place the previous day in the presence of the political authorities.

== Characteristics ==
The bridge doesn't cross the Po at a right angle, but rather, at a 22-degree tilt from perpendicular to the current's direction.

== Bibliography ==
- Renzo Pocaterra (2009). "I ponti di Piacenza". I Treni (313). Salò: Editrice Trasporti su Rotaie. ISSN 0392-4602.
