= Ansaldo =

Ansaldo may refer to:

== People ==
- Ansaldo (name)

== Companies ==
- Gio. Ansaldo & C., an Italian engineering company founded in 1853, and taken over in 1993 by Finmeccanica (now Leonardo S.p.A.)
- Ansaldo Energia, an Italian engineering company and successor to Gio. Ansaldo & C.
- AnsaldoBreda, a subsidiary of Finmeccanica, sold in 2015 to Hitachi Rail
  - AnsaldoBreda Driverless Metro, a driverless electric train related and signaling system
- Ansaldo Electric Drives, motor manufacturer of the Fiat Doblò
- Ansaldo STS, an Italian maker of railroad control equipment

== Cars ==
- Ansaldo (car), a series of Italian cars produced between 1921 and 1931
- Ansaldo Armored Car (1925), a prototype of armored car based on a Pavesi heavy tractor
- Autoblindo Fiat-Ansaldo, an Italian armored car with an autocannon and a turret
- Fiat Ansaldo, an Italian armoured car produced in 1925
- Fiat-Ansaldo M13/40, a tank designed for the Italian Army at the start of World War II
- L3/35, an Italian tankette operating since 1929

== Aircraft ==
- Fiat-Ansaldo A.S.1, a basic light touring aircraft developed in Italy in the late 1920s
- Ansaldo A.1 Balilla, Italy's only domestically designed fighter aircraft of World War I
- Ansaldo SVA, a family of Italian reconnaissance biplane aircraft of World War I
- Ansaldo AC.2, a single-seat fighter aircraft of the 1920s, bought by Italy
- Italian aircraft manufactured by the Ansaldo company

== See also ==
- Ansaldi
