= Ansaldo (name) =

Ansaldo is an Italian name of Germanic origin. It was originally a masculine given name and was later also used as a surname.

== People with the given name ==
- Ansaldo Doria (1134–1174), Genoese statesman and commander of the noble Doria family
- Ansaldo Poggi (1893–1984), Italian maker of stringed instruments

== People with the surname ==
- Cecilia Ansaldo (born 1949), Ecuadorian professor, writer, and critic
- Giovanni Andrea Ansaldo (1584–1638), Italian painter from Genoa
- Giovanni Battista Ansaldo (fl. 1576–1578), Italian Roman Catholic bishop
- Juan Antonio Ansaldo (1910–1958), Spanish aviator and political activist

== See also ==
- Ansaldo (disambiguation)
- Oswald (given name)
