= Innocenzio Ansaldi =

Italian painter

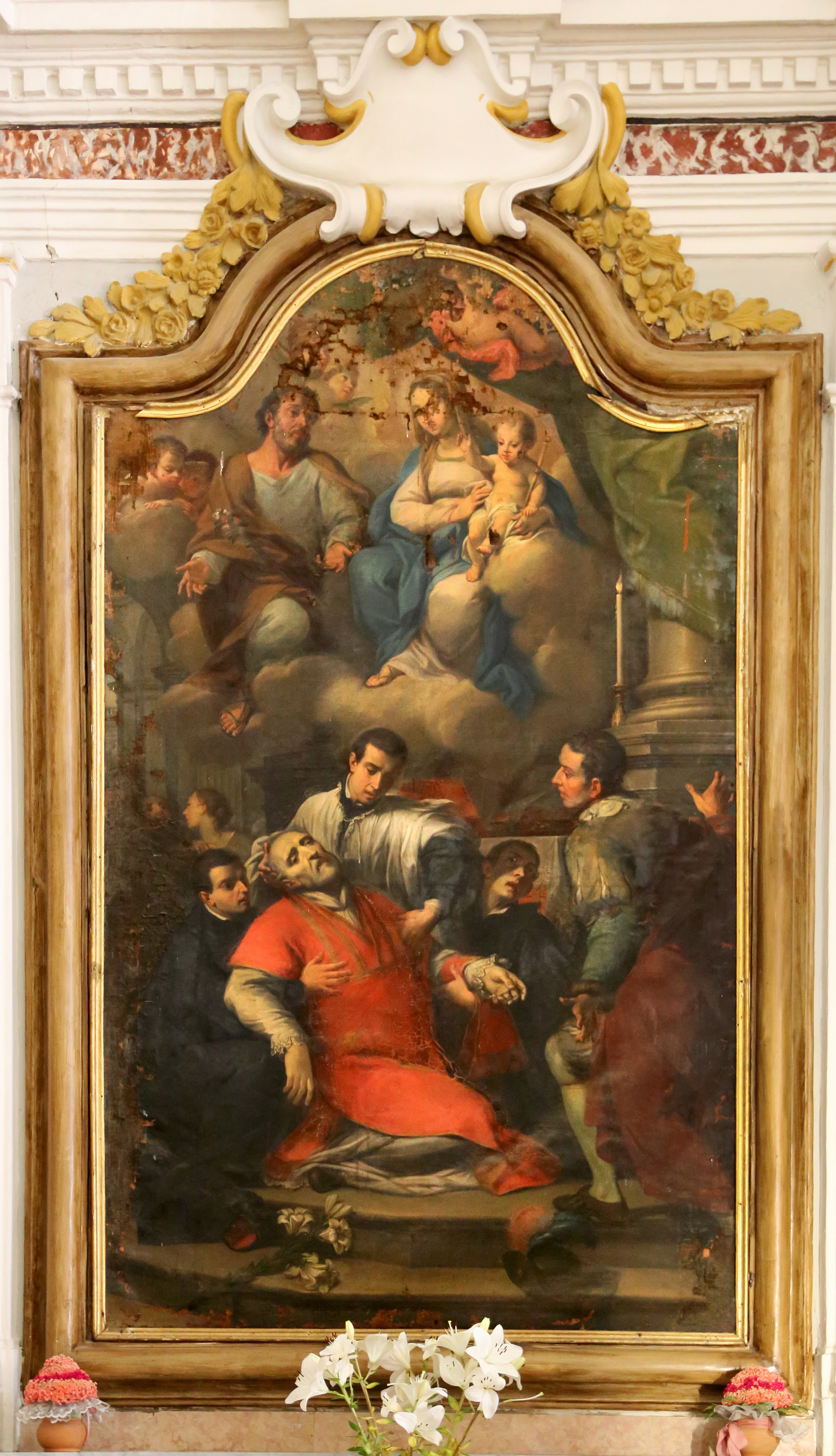
Morte di sant Andrea Avellino, 1759 circa, Pescia, Casa di Nazareth

Innocenzio Ansaldi (Pescia, Tuscany, February 12, 1734 - 1816) was an Italian painter and writer on art.

== Biography ==
It is not clear that he is related to either Casto Innocenzio Ansaldi (1710 — 1780), a prolific contemporary writer and theologian from Piacenza or Giovanni Andrea Ansaldi (1584 – 1638), a prolific Genoese painter.

Innocenzio enrolled to obtain a classical education at the College of Florence. However, he inclined towards painting and the arts. In Florence, he briefly worked with Father Alberigo de Vellano, a priest who had trained with Ottaviano Dandini and Sebastiano Conca. Patronage with various ecclesiastical and diplomatic figures allowed him to trave through Italy. In 1772, he traveled to Rome, where he became a follower of Anton Raphael Mengs. Returning to Florence and Tuscany, he made paintings of sacred subjects. Among his writings on art are Descrizione delle Pitture, Sculture, ed Architetture delle Citta e Subborghi di Pescia nella Toscano 8vo, Bologna, 1772; a Catalogo delle migliori Pitture, &c, della Valdinievole, printed in the Istoria di Pescia; and a translation in verse of Charles Alphonse du Fresnoy's Art of Painting (Il Pittore Instruito) published, with a memoir of Ansaldi by Canon Moreri, Bologna, 1820.,

His works are recondite, erudite, and panegyrical poems about art and artists, full of classical references, but often short on insight.
