= Dewoitine D.9 =

D.9
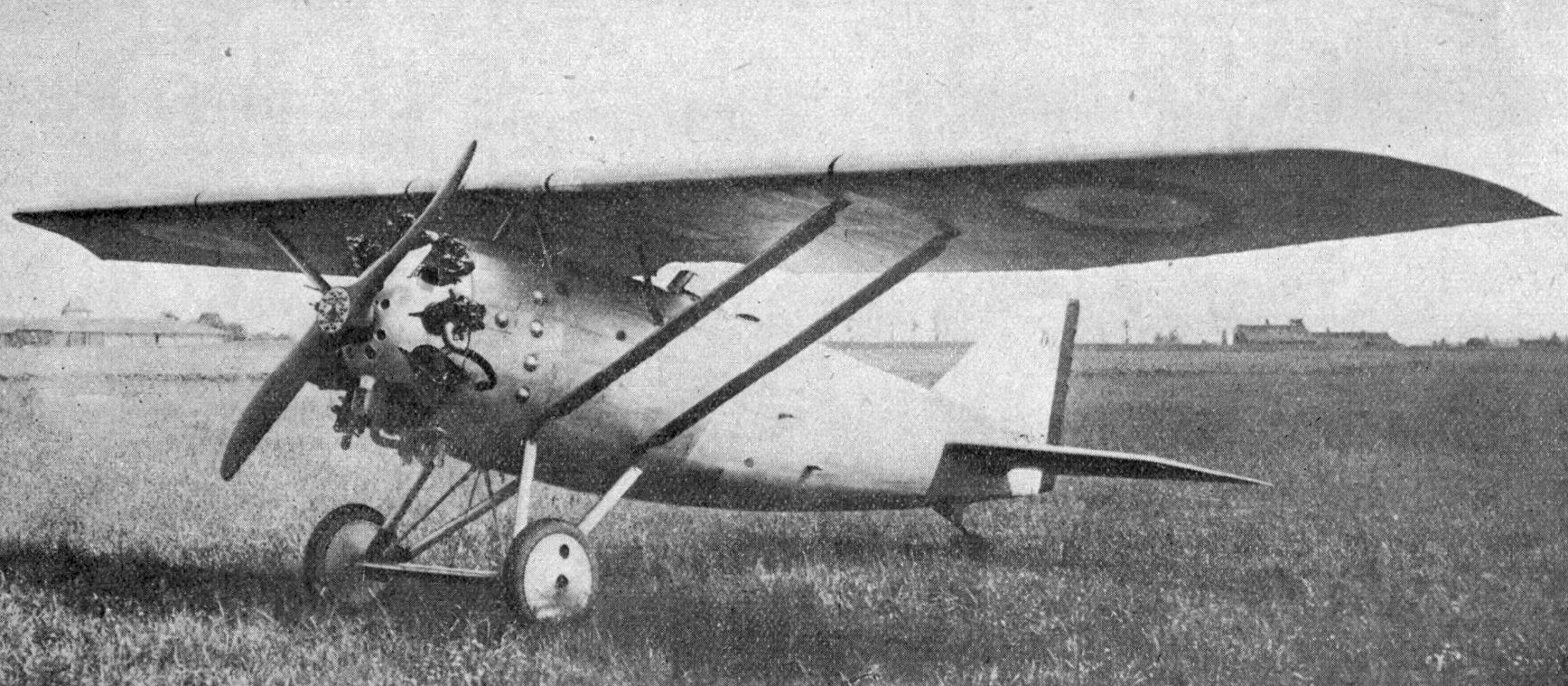

General information
- Type: Monoplane fighter
- Manufacturer: Dewoitine
- Designer: Emile Dewoitine
- Primary user: Regia Aeronautica
- Number built: 150+

History
- First flight: 1924

The Dewoitine D.9 was a French monoplane fighter built by Dewoitine and built under licence in Italy as the Ansaldo AC.3.

== Design and development ==
The D.9 was a single-seat high-wing monoplane with a conventional landing gear and powered by a 320 hp (239 kW) Gnome-Rhône 9Ab Jupiter radial engine. First flown in 1924 it was not accepted by the French Army being ranked sixth in the 1923 single-seat fighter competition. A small number of production aircraft were sold for export to Belgium and Yugoslavia and three were built from parts by EKW for the Swiss Air Force. The biggest achievement of the type was an order to licence-build 150 aircraft for the Italian Regia Aeronautica, built by Ansaldo as the Ansaldo AC.3. The type served into the 1930s with the Italian forces.

== Operators ==
Belgium

- Belgian Air Force - two

Kingdom of Italy

- Regia Aeronautica - 150 licence-built as the Ansaldo AC.3

Switzerland

- Swiss Air Force, three licence-built by EKW

Yugoslavia

- Yugoslav Royal Air Force - six

== Specifications ==
D.9 C1 6-view

Data from Illustrated Encyclopedia of Aircraft

General characteristics

- Crew: one
- Length: 7.30 m (23 ft 11 in)
- Wingspan: 12.80 m (42 ft 0 in)
- Height: 3.00 m (9 ft 10 in)
- Wing area: 25.00 m^{2} (269.1 sq ft)
- Empty weight: 945 kg (2,083 lb)
- Max takeoff weight: 1,333 kg (2,939 lb)
- Powerplant: 1 × Gnome-Rhône 9Ab Jupiter radial piston engine, 420 kW (560 hp)

Performance

- Maximum speed: 245 km/h (152 mph, 132 kn) at sea level
- Range: 400 km (250 mi, 220 nmi)
- Service ceiling: 8,500 m (27,900 ft)
- Rate of climb: 8.75 m/s (1,722 ft/min)

Armament

- Guns: 2 x 7.7 mm (0.303 in) Vickers machine guns (synchronised, fuselage mounted)
  2 x 7.7mm (0.303 in) Darne machine guns (wing mounted but not always fitted)

== See also ==
Related lists

- List of Interwar military aircraft
