= Ansaldo armored car (1925) =

Italian armored car

- Type: Armored car
- Place of origin: Italy

Service history
- In service: Prototype only
- Used by: Italy

Production history
- Designed: 1920-1930
- Manufacturer: Ansaldo
- Produced: 1925
- No. built: 1 (2 more possibly)

Specifications
- Mass: 8,250 kg (18,190 lb)
- Length: 4.60 m (15 ft 1 in)
- Width: 2.60 m (8 ft 6 in)
- Height: 2.90 m (9 ft 6 in)
- Crew: 3
- Armor: 6 mm - 16 mm
- Main armament: 1 x 45 mm gun or 1 x 37 mm gun
- Secondary armament: One 6.5 mm Model 1914 or 8 mm Hotchkiss
- Engine: Fiat model 634, 6-cylinder, 8,310 cc, 75 hp (56 kW)
- Suspension: Leaf spring suspension on two helical shafts
- Maximum speed: 43.5 km/h (27.0 mph)

The Ansaldo armored car was a prototype armored fighting vehicle built by Ansaldo in 1925, based on a Pavesi P4 heavy tractor.

== Design ==
The prototype was armed with a 45 mm / 37 mm cannon in a turret. It had four 1,500 mm (59.1 in) diameter wheels with 400 mm (16 in) wide tyres. The engine was at the front behind a radiator protected by armour plates. Poor visibility and driving difficulties led to abandonment of the project.

== Bibliography ==
- Eserciti del ventesimo secolo N. 7 - Mezzi Corazzati e blindati 1919-1934

== See also ==
Vehicles of comparable role and era

- Lancia IZM
