= FS Class E.491 and E.492 =

FS class E.491/492
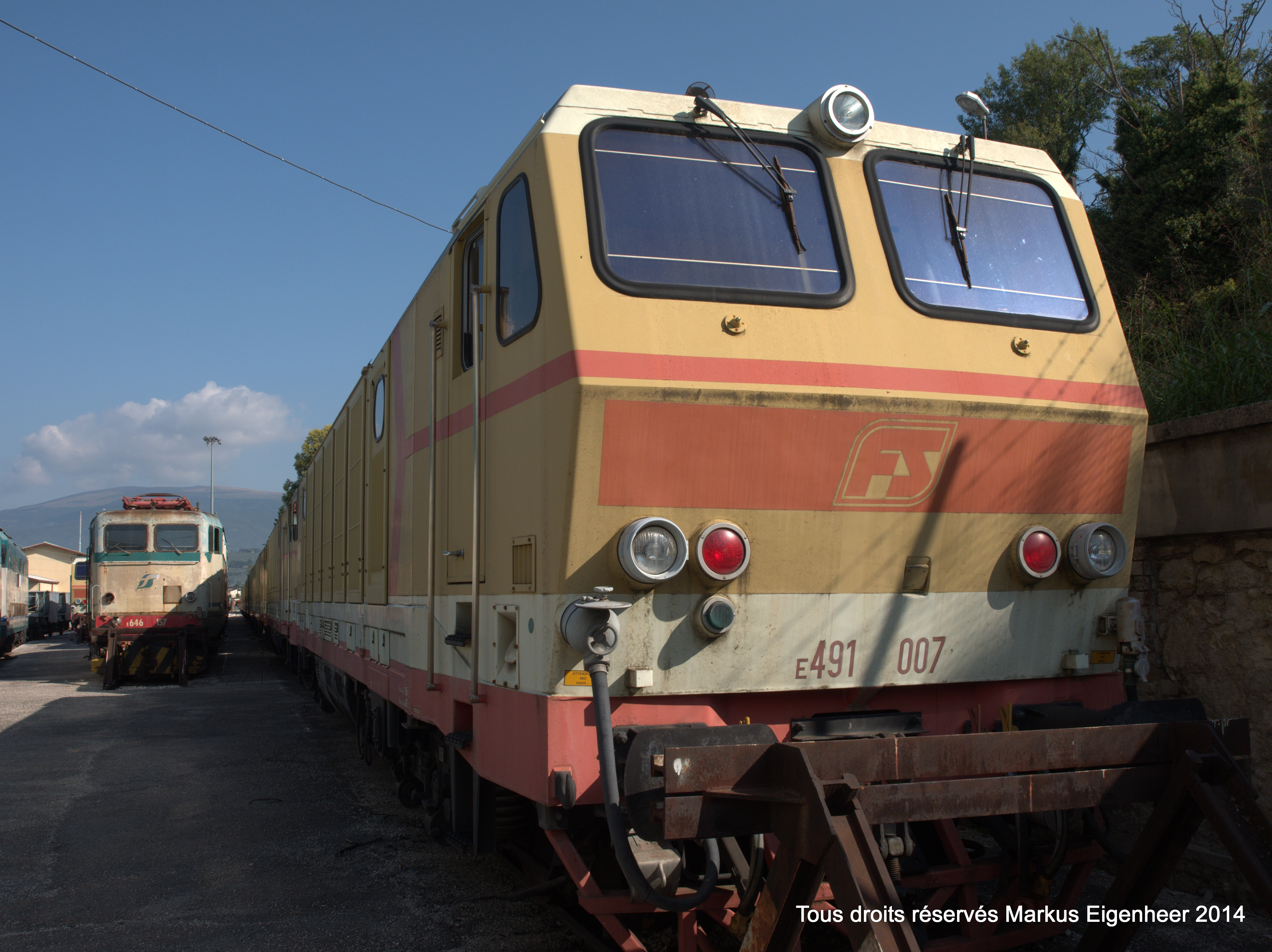
Type and origin
- Power type: Electric
- Builder: Consorzio TEAM (Fiat Ferroviaria Savigliano e Ansaldo Trasporti)
- Build date: E.491:1986 - 1990; E.492:1987 - 1990
Specifications
- Configuration
  - UIC: Bo′Bo′
- Wheel diameter: 1,100 mm (43.31 in)
- Wheelbase: 8,700 mm (28 ft 6.5 in) between bogie pivots 2,600 mm (8 ft 6.4 in) between the axles of each bogie
- Length: 17,000 mm (55 ft 9.3 in)
- Width: 3,000 mm (9 ft 10.1 in)
- Height: 4,310 mm (14 ft 1.7 in)
- Loco weight: 86 short tons (77 long tons; 78 t)
- Electric system/s: 25 kV 50 Hz AC Catenary
- Current pickup(s): Pantograph
- Traction motors: 3-phase asynchronous
- Transmission: E.491: 34/96; E.492: 39/96
Performance figures
- Maximum speed: E.491: 140 km/h (87 mph); E.492: 160 km/h (99 mph)
- Power output: 3,400 kW (4,600 hp)
Career
- Operators: Trenitalia
- Number in class: E.491: 19 units E.492: 6 units
- Disposition: never entered active service

The FS Class E.491 and E.492 were an Italian electric 25 kV 50 Hz AC locomotives built during the 1980s by the TEAM (Trazione Electrica Alternata Monofase) consortium, formed by FIAT ferroviaria, Ansaldo and other companies. The lines of the locomotive were designed by Italian designer Giorgetto Giugiaro. Group E.491 was designed to be used on freight trains (max speed 140 km/h or 87 mph) while E.492 was designed for fast passenger trains (max speed 160 km/h or 99 mph).

== Intended use ==
They were intended to be used on the rail lines of Sardinia, at the time subject of future electrification. The project was later abandoned, but a lot of units had already been ordered and built, and since the catenary on the mainland is mostly 3 kV DC (except for high speed lines), and the locomotive was only able to run on 25 kV AC, the group never entered into active service.

== Disposal ==
FS have tried to sell them to foreign railways (France and Bulgaria), but never succeeded. In 2008, the whole batch of 25 locomotives were sold to Fruilexport, a company established in Niš (Serbia). It seems thenceforth likely that they will be used on the Serbian 25 kV network.
