= Pavesi P4 =

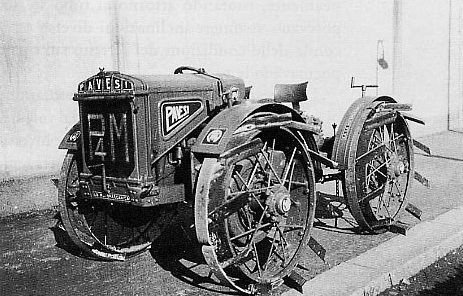
- Pavesi P4M

Overview
- Manufacturer: La Motomeccanica Brevetti, Fiat
- Production: 1918-1940
- Designer: Ugo Pavesi

The Pavesi P4 was a tractor, sometimes used as an artillery tractor, produced in Italy in 1918 by Ugo Pavesi. It was the first 4-wheel drive tractor developed in Italy, as well as Italy's first articulated tractor.

== History and civilian versions ==
The La Moto Aratrice Pavesi-Tolotti company began development of the P4 in 1913, which was slowed by World War I, so that it wasn't available for demonstration until 1918. After proving itself in tests in muddy fields around Rome, the P4 took part in different competitions and demonstrations in the 1920s, many of which were attended by the royal family of the House of Savoy and Benito Mussolini. The base model P4 used a 15-20 hp engine, the P4M utilized a 40 hp engine, and the P4S featured a 25 hp engine. These were produced until the 1930s by Pavesi's new company, La Motomeccanica Brevetti Ing. Pavesi.

== Military versions ==
Although agile, the P4 was also expensive (45,000 lire compared to 27,000 lire for a conventional tractor) and difficult to maintain. While this made it unpopular with many small farmers, the Royal Italian Army took great interest in the tractor. In 1923 a modified, militarized version (the Modello 25) won a competition organized by the Ministero della guerra for a heavy artillery tractor. The Regio Esercito was unable to afford the Modello 25 at the time, but 60 were sold to Spain from between 1923 and 1925. The Modello 25 was eventually adopted by Italy in 1925. 1,000 units (over a period of four years) of the improved version, the Modello 26, were produced by Fiat (as the Pavesi company was unable to meet the demand) for towing artillery pieces. An improved model, the Modello 30, was produced in 1930/1931. Production of the Modello 30A (differing from the 30 by using dynamo powered lights) started in 1934. By September 1937, Italian Army units had received 2,300 Model 26, 30, and 30A tractors with another 270 on order, with production stopping in 1938. These tractors served from the Second Italo-Ethiopian War through World War II, and were used extensively in the North African campaign. The militarized P4 models were eventually replaced in service by the SPA TM40.

== Foreign operators ==
In the United Kingdom, Armstrong Whitworth obtained a license to produce the P4 which was passed on to Armstrong Siddeley. The Mechanical Warfare Experimental Establishment was uninterested in using this design so it was not developed any further. In France, the P4 was marketed as the Agrophile-Pavesi by the Société Auxiliaire Agricole. Weiss Manfréd Acél és Fémművek in Hungary manufactured a licensed version of the P4, and in 1935 Greece purchased 224 of the tractors from FIAT, which were used to tow Schneidere 105mm and 150mm howitzers. Sweden licensed the P4 as the Kanontraktor m/28, built by NOHAB Industri AB in Trollhättan, and the German Wehrmacht made use of the tractors starting in September, 1939.

== Specifications ==
Civilian Models
Model	P4	P4S	P4M
Engine	2 cylinder gasoline, 4520 cm^{3}, 15-20 hp at 900 rpm	2 cylinder gasoline, 4520 cm^{3}, 25 hp at 900 rpm	4 cylinder gasoline, 4700 cm^{3}, 40 hp at 1300 rpm
Maximum speed	7.8 km/h	7.8 km/h	10.7 km/h
Forward/reverse gears	2/2	2/2	3/1
Length	3.3 m	3.3 m	3.5 m
Width	1.9 m	1.9 m	1.9 m
Weight	2500 kg	2500 kg	3300 kg

Military Models
	Modello 26	Modello 30A
Length	4100 mm	4115 mm
Wheelbase	2420 mm	2420 mm
Width	2050 mm	2050 mm
Height	1850 mm (without tarp), 2400 mm (with tarp)	1850 mm (without tarp), 2400 mm (with tarp)
Ground clearance	480 mm	480 mm
Unladen weight	4680 kg	4780 kg
Crew	8	8
Payload	1000 kg	1000 kg
Max. towing load	3800 kg	3800 kg
Max. speed (on-road)	22 km/h	22 km/h
Range	280 km	265 km
Fuel capacity	75 + 30 l	75 + 26 l
Engine	4-cylinder P4/100, 52 hp at 1500 rpm	4-cylinder P4/100, 57 hp at 1800 rpm

== See also ==
- Gama Goat – military semi-amphibius vehicle
