= Cecilia Ansaldo =

Ecuadorian professor, essayist, and literary critic

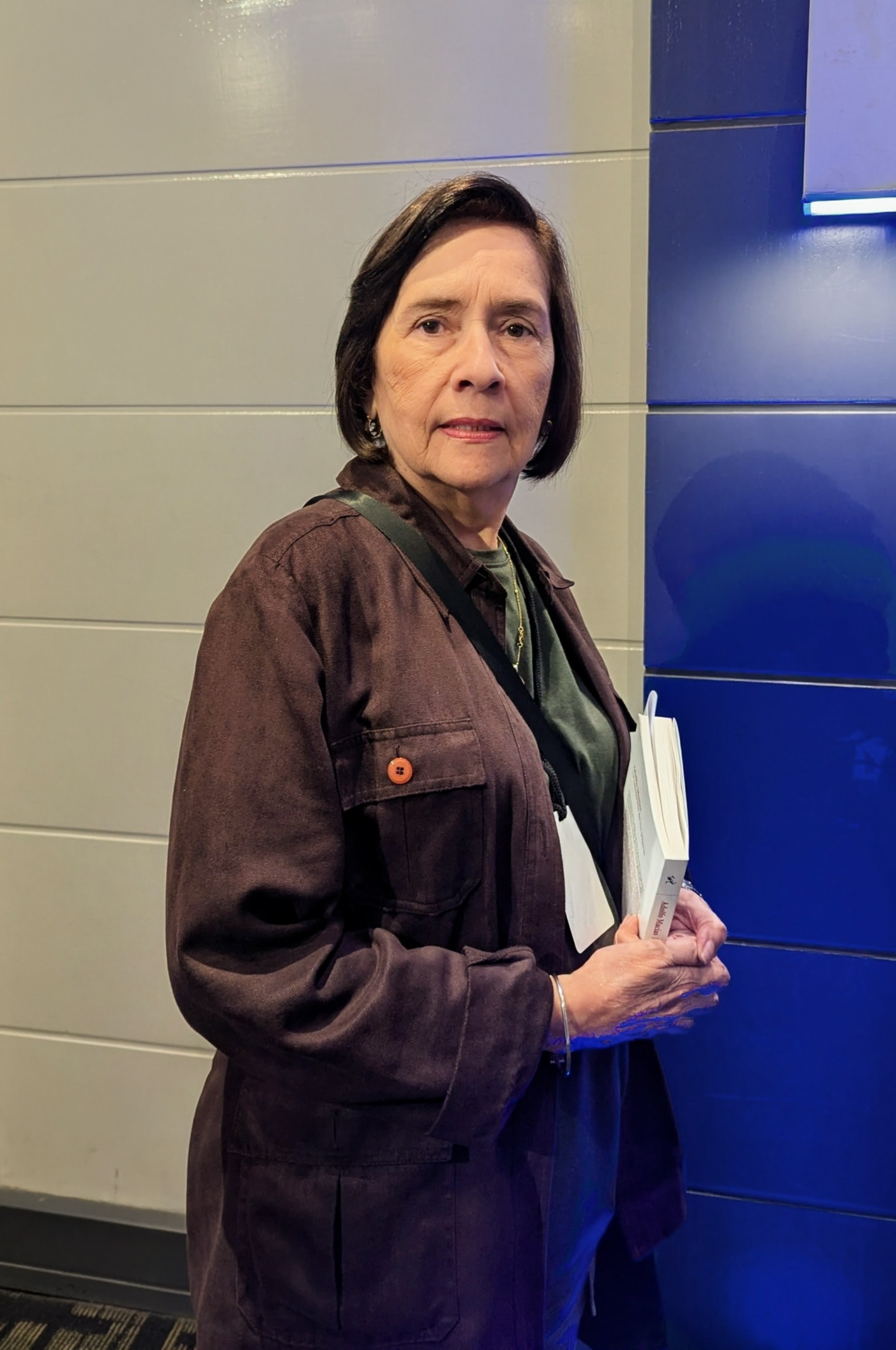
- Born: Cecilia Ansaldo Briones; 1949 (age 76–77); Guayaquil, Ecuador
- Education: Universidad Católica de Santiago de Guayaquil
- Occupations: Professor, writer, critic
- Employers: Universidad Católica de Santiago de Guayaquil; Universidad Casa Grande
- Organization: Academia Ecuatoriana de la Lengua

Cecilia Ansaldo Briones (born 1949) is an Ecuadorian professor, essayist, and literary critic.

== Biography ==
Cecilia Ansaldo was born in Guayaquil in 1949. She completed her secondary studies at the Dolores Baquerizo school, and higher education at the Universidad Católica de Santiago de Guayaquil, where she obtained a licentiate in educational sciences.

During her teaching career, she has worked at the Santo Domingo de Guzmán school, the German School of Guayaquil, the Universidad Católica de Santiago de Guayaquil, and the Mónica Herrera School, among others. She was also dean of the Universidad Católica's faculty of philosophy and letters and rector of the German School.

She is currently a professor at the Universidad Católica and Universidad Casa Grande. In 2015, she became a member of the Academia Ecuatoriana de la Lengua a correspondent organization of the Royal Spanish Academy. She is an opinion columnist in the newspaper El Universo, a member of the Mujeres del Ático group, and a founding member of the Open Book Station Cultural Center. She has chaired the Guayaquil International Book Fair's content committee since 2015.

== Awards and recognition ==
- Medal of Merit from the Mayor of Guayaquil, 2008
- Medal of Merit from the Philanthropic Society of Guayas, 2012
- Career Tribute from the Universidad Católica de Santiago de Guayaquil, 2018

== Publications ==
=== Essays ===
- "El cuento ecuatoriano de los últimos 30 años", in La literatura ecuatoriana en los últimos 30 años 1950–1980 (1983), El Conejo: Quito
- "Dos décadas de cuento ecuatoriano 1970–1990", in La literatura ecuatoriana de las dos últimas décadas 1970–1990 (1993), University of Cuenca
- "Una mirada 'otra' a ciertos personajes femeninos de la narrativa ecuatoriana", in Memorias del V encuentro de literatura ecuatoriana (1995), University of Cuenca

=== Anthologies ===
- Cuento contigo: antología del cuento ecuatoriano (1993), Universidad Católica de Santiago de Guayaquil, Universidad Andina Simón Bolívar
- Las mujeres del ático tienen la palabra (1994)
- Cuentos de Guayaquil: antología (2011), Municipality of Guayaquil, ISBN 9789942036650
- Antología del cuento ecuatoriano (2012), with Elisa Ayala González, Municipality of Guayaquil, ISBN 9789942036650
