= Ansaldo (1853–1993) =

Italian engineering company

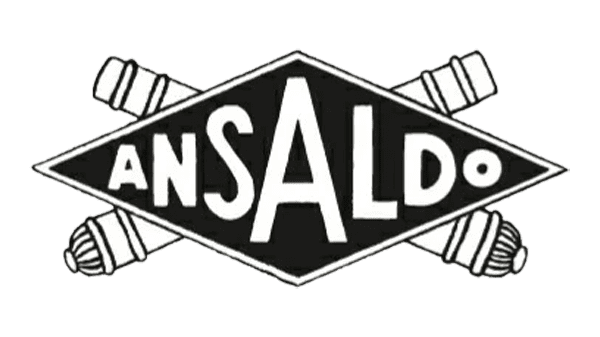
- Industry: Engineering
- Founded: 1853
- Defunct: 1993; 33 years ago
- Fate: absorbed by Finmeccanica in 1993 (now Leonardo S.p.A.).
- Successor: Hitachi Rail Italy (formerly AnsaldoBreda); Ansaldo Energia; Hitachi Rail STS (formerly Ansaldo STS)
- Headquarters: Genoa, Italy
- Products: Transport aircraft Bombers; Experimental planes Air force trainers Seaplanes; Ship; Locomotives; Tanks
- Subsidiaries: Ansaldo Energia; Ansaldo STS; Fabbrica Aeroplani Ing. O. Pomilio

Ansaldo was one of Italy's oldest and most important engineering companies, existing for 140 years from 1853 to 1993.

== History ==
=== 19th century foundation ===
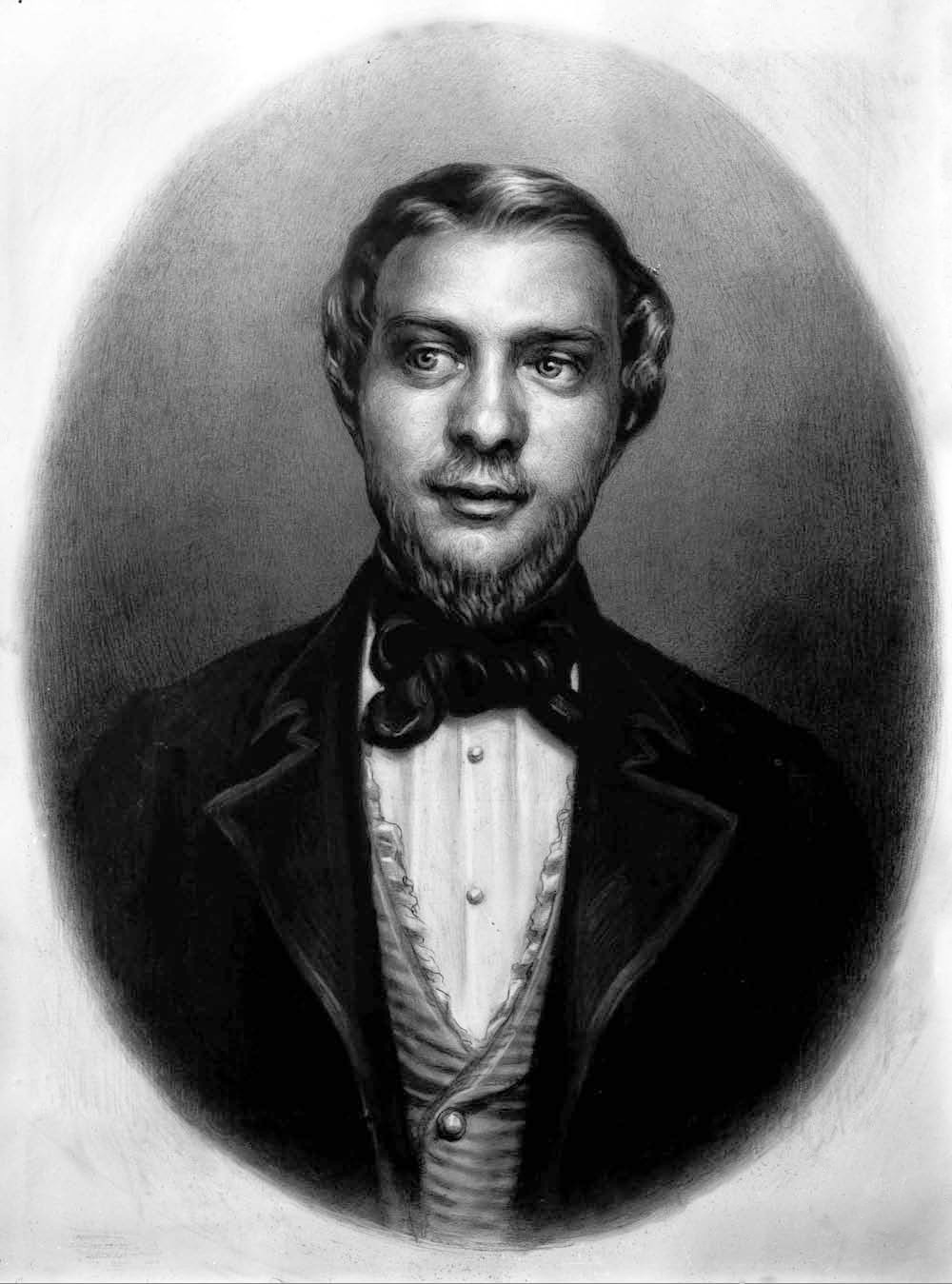
Giovanni Ansaldo, 1853

The company was founded in 1853 as Gio. Ansaldo & C. S.A.S. by renowned players in the Genoese business world, such as Giovanni Ansaldo, Raffaele Rubattino, Giacomo Filippo Penco and Carlo Bombrini. Until the end of the 19th century, the company focused on manufacturing and repairing railway components, quickly becoming a 10,000-worker company with seven factories, and starting to expand into sectors such as shipbuilding and mechanical works in general.

=== 20th century expansion and dissolution ===
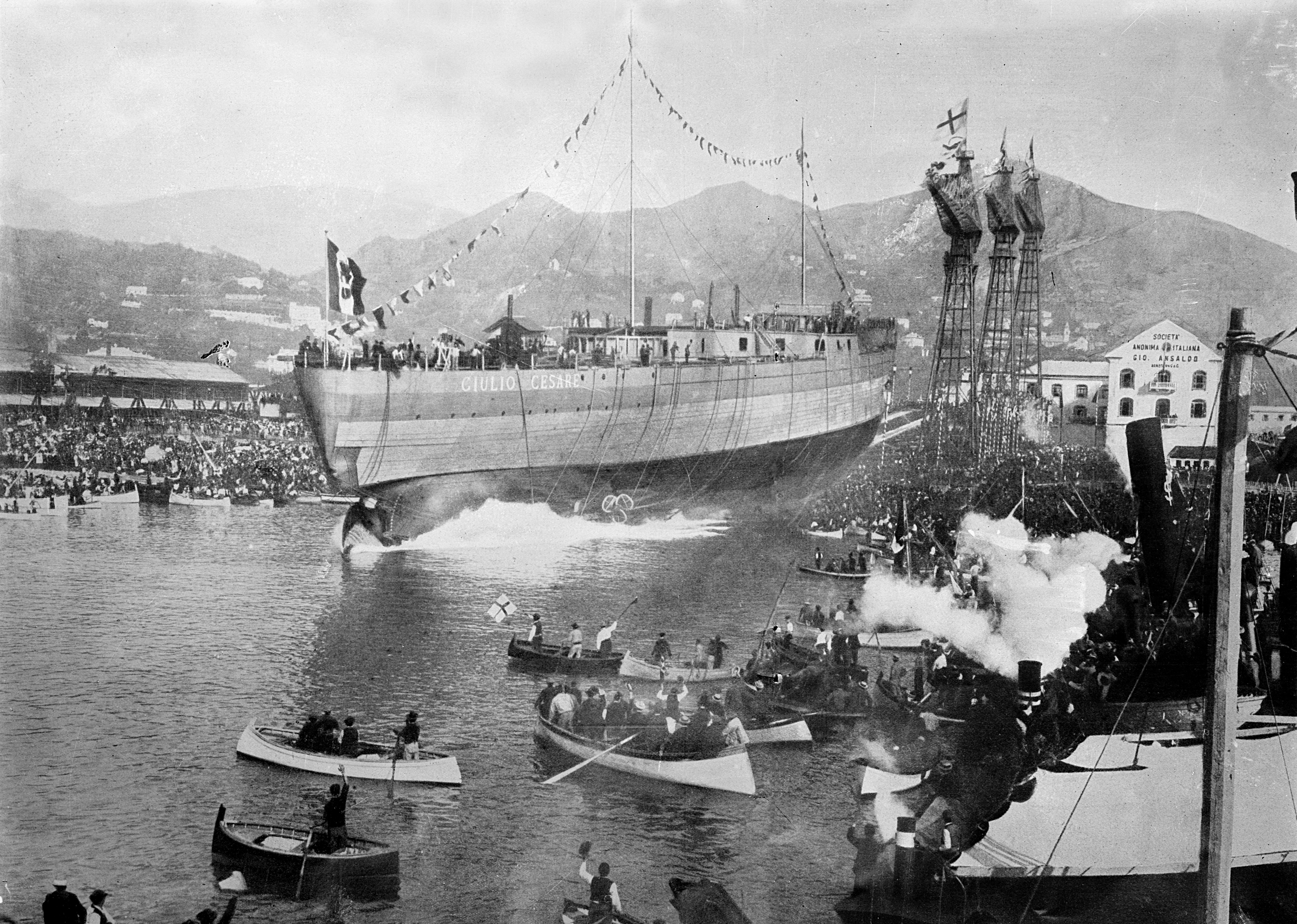
Launch of Italian battleship Giulio Cesare 1911 Sestri Ponente, Genova

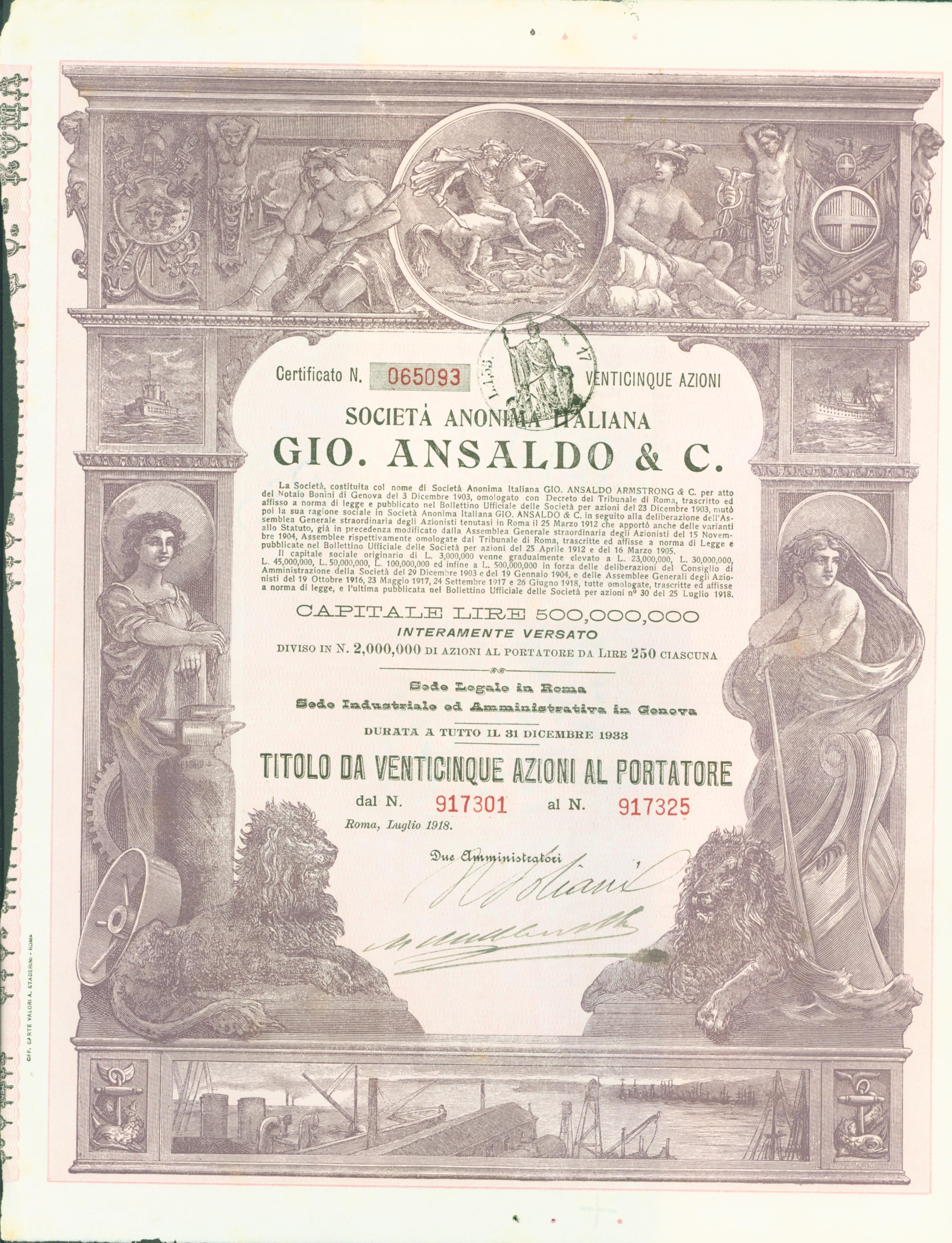
Share of the Gio. Ansaldo & C., issued in July 1918

In 1904, Ansaldo was bought by Ferdinando Maria Perrone who, along with his sons Mario and Pio, bound the name of the Perrone family to the history of the company. Over the next twenty years, he aimed at making Ansaldo fully independent both in the ironworks and weapon-making areas, thanks to strong vertical integration. The onset of World War I was of obvious potential benefit to the company, though Italy was initially neutral. Ansaldo advocated for Italian entry into the war, both directly and by funding political groups that supported the war, such as Benito Mussolini's proto-Fascist movement.

The efforts paid off when Italy entered the war. In 1914 the company was worth 30 million lire, but its market value grew to 500 million in 1918. When the company issued shares in the summer of 1918 worth 400 million lire Ansaldo employed 80,000 workers, had dozens of factories and controlled companies such as A. Cerpelli & C., Banca industriale Italiana, Cantieri Officine Savoia, Dynamit Nobel, Gio.Fossati & C., Lloyd Italico, Nazionale di Navigazione, Pomilio, Società Idroelettrica Negri, and Transatlantica Italiana.

Following a financial crisis with its largest creditor, Banca Italiana di Sconto, and problems in reconverting factories after the end of World War I, the Perrone family abandoned the company in 1921, and the Banca d'Italia led a consortium to save it from bankruptcy. Company strategies were drastically sized down, and during the 1920s, even though electro-mechanical productions grew significantly, Ansaldo found itself in such dire difficulties that it finally entered the control of the Istituto per la Ricostruzione Industriale (IRI), under which the company found new life and growth, partly thanks to the new war effort during fascism. The main figure in this rebirth, the engineer Agostino Rocca, reconfigured the structure and organisation of the company during his tenure as chief executive officer from 1935 to the end of World War II. War contracts indeed led to a significant growth: Ansaldo had 22,000 employees in 1939, and 35,000 in 1943.

After the end of World War II, conversion to peacetime production again caused problems for the company. In 1948, IRI entrusted the company to Finmeccanica, which operated several reorganisation measures during the 1950s and 1960s, such as the relinquishing of all shipbuilding activities to Italcantieri of Trieste in 1966. From that year, Finmeccanica further engaged Ansaldo within its activities, and in 1980 they formed Italy's largest thermo-electric group. In 1993, Ansaldo ceased to exist as an independent entity, having been completely absorbed by Finmeccanica.

=== Aftermath in the 21st century ===
Some companies controlled by Leonardo S.p.A. still bear the Ansaldo family name:

- Ansaldo Energia, involved in building electric power plants, based in Genoa.
- Ansaldo Caldaie, involved in building fired Steam Generators. Sofinter Group (Private Company located in Gallarate, Italy).
- Ansaldo Ricerche, involved in nuclear fusion technology, founded in 1987 by merging various research and development departments of Ansaldo and Nucleare Italiana Reattori Avanzati; it takes part in the international ITER project.
- Ansaldo Fuel Cells, founded in 1993 as a spin-off of the former, devoted to fuel cells.
- Ansaldo Nucleare, founded in 1989 by merging Ansaldo Meccanico Nucleare and Nucleare Italiana Reattori Avanzati; in 1999, it was absorbed by Ansaldo Energia, but in 2005 it was re-founded as a separate company, although 100%-controlled by Ansaldo Energia.
- Nidec ASI (formerly Ansaldo Sistemi Industriali S.p.A.) is an Italian manufacturer of electric motors, generators, control systems and industrial automation equipment. Formerly part of Finmeccanica, the company was acquired by Japan's Nidec Group in 2012 and subsequently renamed Nidec ASI S.p.A. The company is headquartered in Milan, with Italian operations in Genoa, Montebello Vicentino and Monfalcone, and international subsidiaries in China, France, Germany, Romania, Russia, Japan and Singapore.Nidec ASI website

== Products ==
=== Aircraft production ===
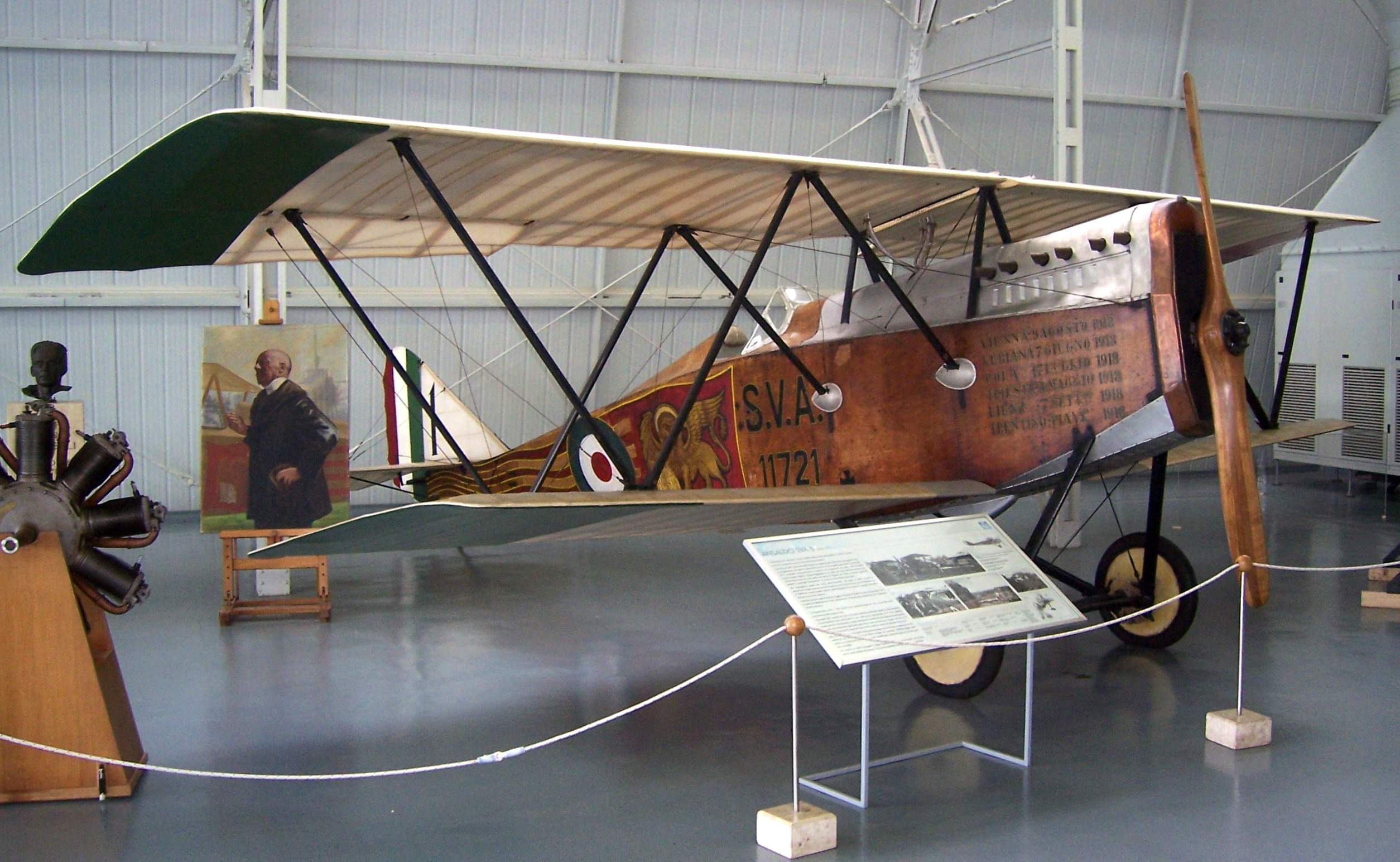
Ansaldo SVA 5

- Ansaldo Baby (1915) single seat biplane reconnaissance floatplane, a British Sopwith Baby built under licence with minor changes
- Ansaldo A.1 Balilla (1917) Single-engine one-seat biplane fighter aircraft
- Ansaldo SVA.1 (1917) Single-engine one-seat biplane utility aircraft
  - SVA.2 Production version of SVA.1
  - SVA.3 Fast-climbing interceptor version of SVA.2
  - SVA.4 Production version of SVA.2 equipped for reconnaissance
  - SVA.5 Production version of SVA.2
  - SVA.6 Prototype bomber version of SVA.2
  - SVA.8 Single prototype (purpose unknown)
  - SVA.9 Two-seat unarmed reconnaissance version with larger wings
  - SVA.10 Armed version of SVA.9
- Ansaldo A.120 Parasol reconnaissance fighter
- Ansaldo A.300 (1919) Single-engine two-seat biplane utility aircraft. Three-seat versions were also built for reconnaissance use.
- Ansaldo AC.1 () designation for imported French Dewoitine D.1 single-engine two-seat parasol-wing fighter
- Ansaldo AC.2 (1922) licence-built French Dewoitine D.1
- Ansaldo AC.3 (1924) licence-built French Dewoitine D.9 (a development of the D.1)
- Ansaldo AC.4 (1927) AC.2 with 420 hp (313.2 kW) FIAT A.20 engine.

=== Ships ===
- Giuseppe Garibaldi, cruiser built for the Regia Marina, 1899
- Giulio Cesare, battleship built for the Regia Marina, 1911
- SS Roma, built for the Navigazione Generale Italiana, 1926
- Alberico da Barbiano, cruiser built for the Regia Marina, 1930
- Alberto di Giussano, cruiser built for the Regia Marina, 1930
- Bartolomeo Colleoni, cruiser built for the Regia Marina, 1930
- SS Rex, built for the Italian Line, 1931
- SS Cristoforo Colombo built for the Italian Line, 1953
- Raimondo Montecuccoli, cruiser built for the Regia Marina, 1934
- Eugenio di Savoia, cruiser built for the Regia Marina, 1935
- Littorio, battleship built for the Regia Marina, 1937
- Aquila, aircraft carrier built for the Regia Marina, 1941
- SS Andrea Doria, Ansaldo Shipyards of Genoa, 1951
- SS Leonardo da Vinci, built for the Italian Line, 1960
- SS Michelangelo, built for the Italian Line, 1965

=== Armored vehicles ===
- Ansaldo Armored Car (1925)
- Fiat-Ansaldo CV-33 (1935 )
- L3/35
- Autoblindo Fiat-Ansaldo
- L6/40 tank (designed by Ansaldo, manufactured by Fiat, 1940- )
- M13/40 tank
- M14/41 tank
- M15/42 tank
- P26/40 tank

=== Rolling stock ===
==== Locomotives ====
- D.341
- D.345
- E.424
- D.443
- E.402
- E.428
- E.491
- E.492
- E.636
- E.656

== See also ==
- Finmeccanica
- Ansaldo Energia
- Ansaldo STS
- AnsaldoBreda

== Bibliography ==
- Guida Fondazione Ansaldo. Genova: Fondazione Ansaldo Editore.
- Paride Rugafiori. Ferdinando Maria Perrone da Casa Savoia all'Ansaldo. Torino: UTET, 1992.
- Valerio Castronuovo. (ed.), Storia dell'Ansaldo, vol. 1, "Le origini. 1853 - 1882". Roma: Laterza, 1994. ISBN 88-420-4557-8.
- Giorgio Mori (ed.), Storia dell'Ansaldo, vol. 2, "La costruzione di una grande impresa (1883-1902)". Roma: Laterza, 1995.
- Peter Hertner (ed.), Storia dell'Ansaldo. Vol. 3, "Dai Bombrini ai Perrone (1903-1914)." Bari-Roma: Laterza, 1996.
- Valerio Castronovo (ed.), Storia dell'Ansaldo. Vol. 4, "L'Ansaldo e la Grande Guerra (1915-1918)." Bari-Roma: Laterza, 1997.
- Gabriele De Rosa (ed.), Storia dell'Ansaldo. Vol. 5, "Dal crollo alla ricostruzione (1919-1929)." Bari-Roma: Laterza, 1998.
- Gabriele De Rosa (ed.), Storia dell'Ansaldo. Vol. 6, "Dall'IRI alla guerra (1930-1945)." Bari-Roma: Laterza, 1999.
- Giorgio Mori (ed.), Storia dell'Ansaldo, vol. 7, "Dal dopoguerra al miracolo economico (1945-1962)." Roma: Laterza, 2000.
- Valerio Castronovo (ed.), Storia dell'Ansaldo. Vol. 8, "Una grande industria elettromeccanica." Bari-Roma: Laterza, 2002.
- Valerio Castronovo (ed.), Storia dell'Ansaldo, vol. 9, "Un secolo e mezzo. 1853-2003." Roma: Laterza, 2003. ISBN 97-888-420-6781-8.
- Amedeo Benedetti. "La Fondazione Ansaldo," in Biblioteche Oggi, vol. XXX (2012), no. 4, pp. 48–54.
- Bruno Giontoni and Franca Balletti. Alle origini di una città industriale: Genova e i Comuni del Ponente dalla metà dell'Ottocento agli anni Trenta. Genova: Erga Edizioni, 2021.
