= Casto Innocenzio Ansaldi =

Italian theologian, and archaeologist (1710–1780)

Reverend Casto Innocenzio Ansaldi O.P.
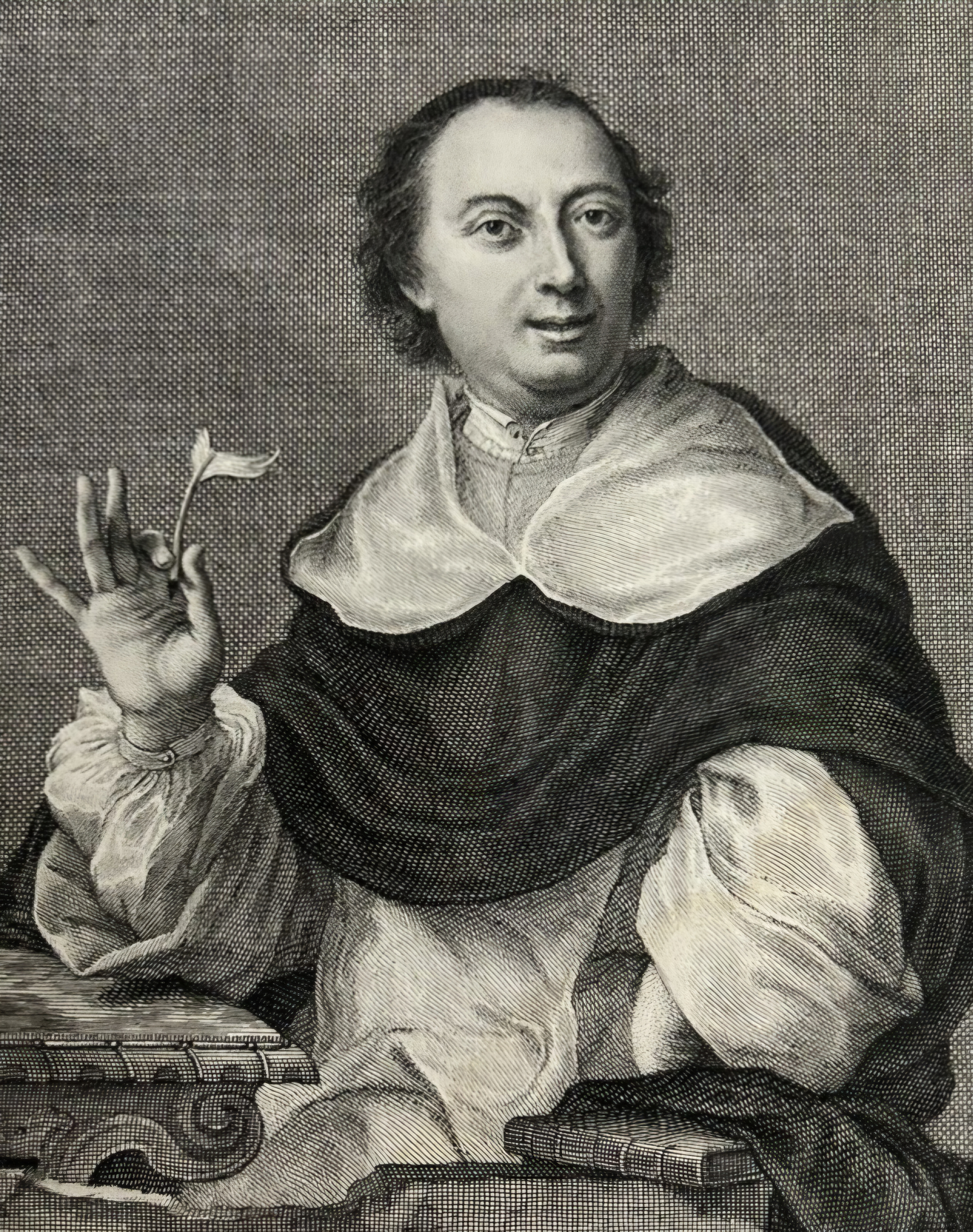
- Born: 7 March 1710; Piacenza, Duchy of Parma
- Died: 4 May 1780 (aged 70); Turin, Kingdom of Sardinia
- Occupations: Theologian; Archaeologist; University teacher

Academic background
- Education: Pontifical University of Saint Thomas Aquinas

Casto Innocenzio Ansaldi O.P. (7 March 1710, Piacenza, Italy – 4 May 1780, Turin) was an Italian professor, theologian and archaeologist.

== Early life and education ==
In 1726, Ansaldi entered the Dominican Order at Parma, where he pursued his preparatory studies. In 1733, he was a student of the College of St. Thomas in Rome, the future Pontifical University of Saint Thomas Aquinas, Angelicum, where he attached himself to Giuseppe Agostino Cardinal Orsi.

== Career ==
In 1735, he taught philosophy at Santa Caterina in Naples, and the following year received the chair of metaphysics at the University of Naples. However, in 1737, he was forced to resign after receiving orders from his superiors to move to Bologna. He seemed to have disobeyed the order and gone into hiding for some time to avoid the consequences. The King of Naples created a chair of theology for him in 1737, which he retained until 1745. In that year, he was appointed first teacher of theology at the Dominican convent in Brescia. Thereafter, to 1770, he taught at Ferrara and then at Turin. In the latter city, he held the chair in theology for twenty years with great success and repute. He was averse to the scholastic method and therefore, had serious trouble with the authorities of the Order, which was finally smoothed over by Angelo Maria Cardinal Quirini and Pope Benedict XIV.

== Bibliography ==
His published works fill several volumes, and have been prized for a combination of theological and historical erudition. Most of them are directed against the anti-Christian tendencies of his day. His most important works are:

- De Causis Inopiae veterum Monumentorum pro copia Martyrum Dignoscenda
- De Martyribus sine Sanguine Dissertatio (Milan, 1739)
- Patriarchae Josephi, Aegypti olim proregis, religio a criminationibus Basnagii vindicata (Naples, 1738), vol. XIII in the Raccolta d'opuscoli di P. Calogerà (Venice, 1741)
- Dissertatio de veteri Ægyptiorium Idolatriâ, in the Raccolta Calogerana, 23, 135.
- De Principiorum Legis naturalis Traditione, Libri tres (Milan, 1742)
- De Romanâ tutelarium deorum in oppugnationibus urbium evocatione liber singularis (Brescia, 1742; Venice, 1753, 1761; Oxford, 1765)
- De traditione principiorum legis naturalis (Brescia, 1743; Oxford, 1765)
- De martyribus sine sanguine (Milan, 1744; Venice, 1756, in the Thesaurus antiquitatum sacrarum of Ugolini), a valuable anti-Dodwellian dissertation on the sufferings of the primitive Christians
- De Forensi Judaeorum Buccina Commentarius (Brescia, 1745)
- Herodiani infanticidii vindiciae against those who impugned its historicity (Brescia, 1746)
- De authenticis sacrarum Scripturarum lectionibus (Verona, 1747), a learned and solid work in favor of the accuracy of the Fathers in quoting Scripture
- De baptismate in Spiritu Sancto et igni commentarius sacer philologicocriticus (Milan, 1752)
- De Theurgiâ deque theurgicis a divo Paulo memoratis commentarius (Milan, 1761)
- Riflessioni sopra i mezzi di perfezionare la filosfia morale (Turin, 1778), with a biography of the author
- De perfectione morali (Turin, 1790)
- Praelectiones theologicae de re sacramentaria (Venice, 1792)

== Controversy ==
His controversy with Francesco Maria Zanotti in defense of Maupertuis's apology (Berlin, 1749) for Christian morality, as superior to that of the Stoics, was celebrated in the eighteenth century. He also compiled Della necessità e verità della religione naturale e rivelata (Venice, 1755), a collection of evidences and admissions from the works of celebrated non-Catholics. His brother, also a Dominican, Carlo Agostino Ansaldi, wrote a work (Turin, 1765) on the large number of the Christians before Constantine I; another brother, Pietro Tommasso Ansaldi, wrote a dissertation on the divinity of Christ (Florence, 1754).
