= I Treni =

Italian railway magazine

- Categories: Railway
- Frequency: Monthly
- First issue: 1980
- Company: ETR - Editrice Trasporti su Rotaie
- Country: Italy
- Based in: Salò
- Language: Italian
- Website: www.etreditrice.eu/indexitreni.php
- ISSN: 0392-4602

I Treni is an Italian railway monthly magazine.

== History ==
The magazine was founded in 1980 by a group of members gathered in the ETR cooperative, continuing the experience of the magazine Italmodel Ferrovie, founded by Italo Briano and published from 1951 to 1979.

== List of editors-in-chief ==
- Erminio Mascherpa (1980-2003)
- Vittorio Cervigni (2004-2021)
- Marcello Zane (2022-)
